= Linda Ronstadt singles discography =

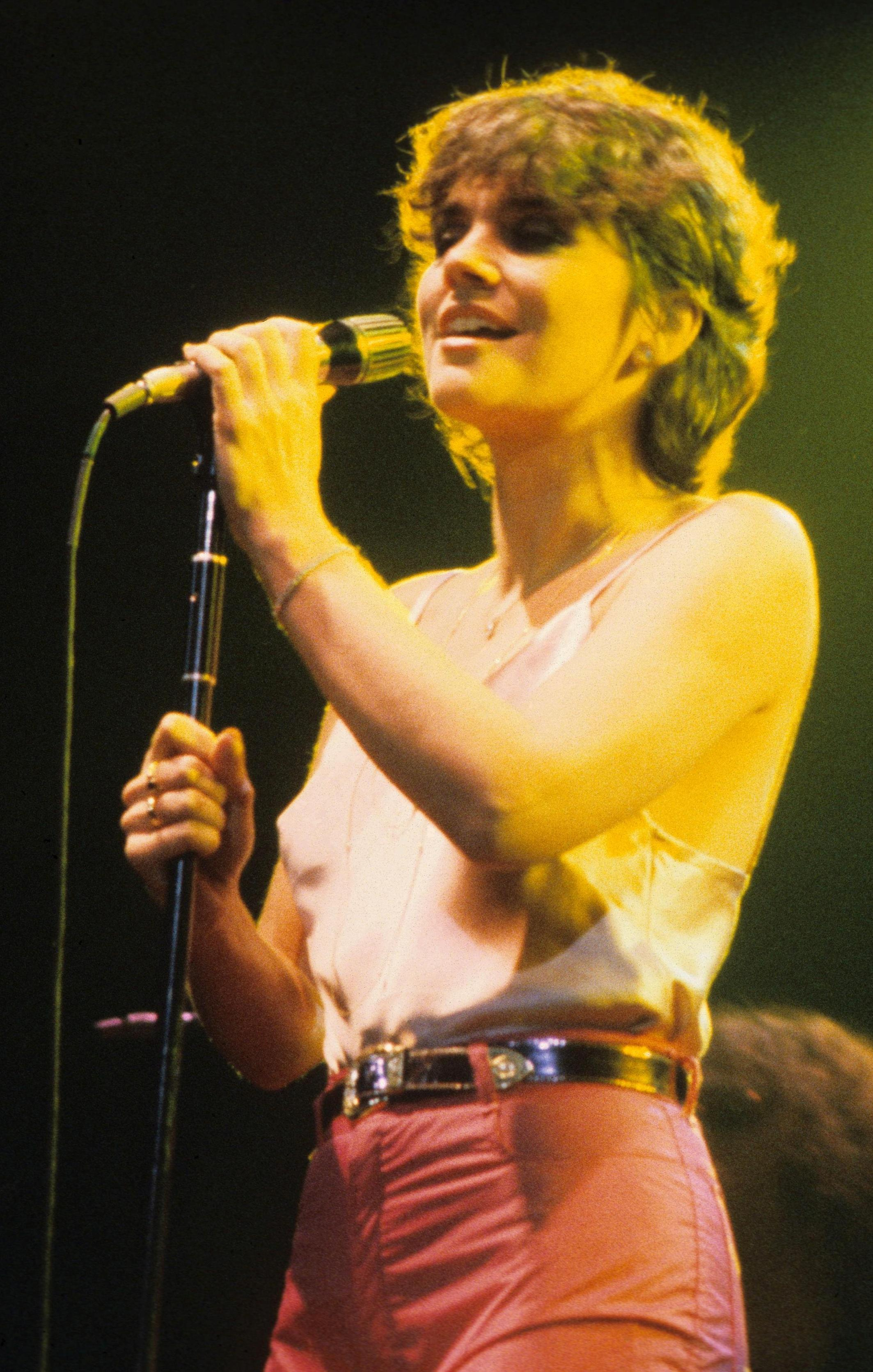
- Linda Ronstadt performing, 1978.
- Lead and collaborative singles: 80
- Featured singles: 4
- Promotional singles: 8
- Other charted songs: 8

The singles discography of American singer Linda Ronstadt contains 80 lead and collaborative singles, four as a featured artist, eight promotional singles and eight other charted songs. Her first credited release was 1967's "Different Drum", which also included the Stone Poneys along with Ronstadt as a featured artist. Ronstadt's first pair of solo singles were released by Capitol Records in 1969. The 1970 release "Long, Long Time" was her first solo charting single. Her 1974 single "You're No Good" topped the US Hot 100, reached number seven in Canada and number 15 in Australia. Its B-side song "I Can't Help It (If I'm Still in Love with You)" reached number two on the US Hot Country Songs list. It was followed by 1975's "When Will I Be Loved", which made the top ten on multiple charts in the United States and Canada, including topping their country surveys. It was followed by the US top five song "Heat Wave" and the US country top five song "Love Is a Rose".

The 1976 single "That'll Be the Day" made the US top 20 and reached the Canadian top five. "Crazy" (the B-side of "Someone to Lay Down Beside Me") reached the top ten on both the US and Canadian country charts. The 1977 single "Blue Bayou" reached the top five of multiple charts including the US Hot 100, the US country chart, the US adult contemporary chart, the Australian singles chart and the Canadian Top Songs chart. It also was her first to make the top 40 on the UK Singles Chart. It was followed by the US and Canadian top ten song "It's So Easy". In 1978, "Back in the U.S.A." made the US and Australian top 20, while "Ooh Baby Baby" made the US and Canadian top ten. The same year, "I Never Will Marry" (the B-side to "Tumbling Dice") made the US country top ten.

In 1980, both of Ronstadt's singles made the US top ten: "How Do I Make You" and "Hurt So Bad". In 1982, both "Get Closer" and "I Knew You When" made the US top 40. Between 1983 and 1984, the singles "Easy for You to Say", "What's New" and "I've Got a Crush on You" made top ten positions on the US and Canadian adult contemporary charts. A collaborative single with James Ingram titled "Somewhere Out There" made the top ten in the US, Canada, the Netherlands and the United Kingdom. A collaboration between Ronstadt, Emmylou Harris and Dolly Parton spawned four top ten US and Canadian country singles: "To Know Him Is to Love Him", "Telling Me Lies", "Those Memories of You" and "Wildflowers". In 1989, Ronstadt and Aaron Neville collaborated on the singles "Don't Know Much" and "All My Life". Both topped the US and Canadian adult contemporary charts, while also reaching top ten positions in Australia, the Netherlands, New Zealand and the United Kingdom.

The 1990 singles "When Something Is Wrong with My Baby" and "Adios" made the US and Canadian adult contemporary top ten. The same year, Ronstadt was featured on Aaron Neville's charting single "Close Your Eyes". In 1992, both "Frenesi" and "Perfidia" were Ronstadt's first to reach the top ten on the US Latin Songs charts. Three more singles would also make the Latin chart. Between 1993 and 1995, the singles "The Blue Train", "Heartbeats Accelerating" and "Oh No Not My Baby" made top 40 positions in the US and Canada. The solo release "Walk On" and the collaborative release "High Sierra" made positions on the Canadian country chart. Among Ronstadt's final single releases was 2006's "Walk Away Renee" (with Ann Savoy) and a 2019 live promotional recording of "You're No Good".

== As lead and collaborative artist ==
=== 1960s ===
List of singles, with selected chart positions, showing other relevant details
Title	Year	Peak chart positions	Album
Title	Year	US	Album
"Up to My Neck in High Muddy Water" (with the Stone Poneys)	1968	93	Linda Ronstadt, Stone Poneys and Friends, Vol. III
"Baby You've Been on My Mind"	1969	—	Hand Sown ... Home Grown
"Long Way Around"	1969	—	Hand Sown ... Home Grown
"—" denotes a recording that did not chart or was not released in that territory.

=== 1970s ===
List of singles, with selected chart positions, showing other relevant details
Title	Year	Peak chart positions										Certifications	Album
Title	Year	US	US AC	US Cou.	AUS	CAN	CAN AC	CAN Cou.	ND	NZ	UK	Certifications	Album
"Will You Love Me Tomorrow"	1970	111	—	—	100	—	—	—	—	—	—		Silk Purse
"Long, Long Time"	1970	25	20	—	—	15	—	—	—	—	—		Silk Purse
"(She's a) Very Lovely Woman" (Note: Released as a double A-side single.)	1971	70	17	—	—	57	—	—	—	—	—		—N/a
"The Long Way Around" (Note: Released as a double A-side single.)	1971	70	17	—	—	57	—	—	—	—	—		—N/a
"I Fall to Pieces"	1971	—	—	—	—	—	—	—	—	—	—		Linda Ronstadt
"Rock Me on the Water"	1972	85	—	—	—	—	—	—	—	—	—		Linda Ronstadt
"Te Lo Dejo A Ti"	1972	—	—	—	—	—	—	—	—	—	—		Silk Purse
"Love Has No Pride"	1973	51	23	—	—	59	6	—	—	—	—		Don't Cry Now
"Silver Threads and Golden Needles"	1974	67	—	20	—	90	—	20	—	—	—		Don't Cry Now
"Colorado"	1974	108	—	—	—	—	—	—	—	—	—		Don't Cry Now
"You're No Good"	1974	1	10	—	15	7	2	—	17	24	—		Heart Like a Wheel
"When Will I Be Loved"	1975	2	3	1	87	7	1	1	—	—	—		Heart Like a Wheel
"Heat Wave"	1975	5	19	—	—	12	12	—	—	—	—		Prisoner in Disguise
"Love Is a Rose"	1975	63	—	5	—	100	—	46	—	—	—		Prisoner in Disguise
"Tracks of My Tears"	1975	25	4	11	—	22	2	25	—	—	42		Prisoner in Disguise
"That'll Be the Day"	1976	11	16	27	59	2	14	17	—	—	52		Hasten Down the Wind
"Someone to Lay Down Beside Me"	1976	42	38	—	—	58	37	—	—	—	—		Hasten Down the Wind
"Lose Again"	1977	76	43	—	—	—	42	—	—	—	—		Hasten Down the Wind
"Blue Bayou"	1977	3	3	2	3	2	2	2	—	3	35	RIAA: Platinum	Simple Dreams
"It's So Easy"	1977	5	37	81	—	9	—	3	13	11	—		Simple Dreams
"Poor Poor Pitiful Me"	1977	31	27	46	29	26	9	36	—	—	—		Simple Dreams
"Lo Siento Mi Vida"	1977	—	—	—	—	—	—	—	—	—	—		Hasten Down the Wind
"Tumbling Dice"	1978	32	—	—	—	—	22	—	—	—	—		Simple Dreams
"Back in the U.S.A."	1978	16	30	41	18	8	—	43	—	24	—		Living in the USA
"Ooh Baby Baby"	1978	7	2	85	76	6	26	—	—	—	—		Living in the USA
"Love Me Tender"	1978	—	—	59	—	—	—	—	—	—	—		Living in the USA
"Just One Look"	1979	44	5	—	38	46	4	—	—	—	—		Living in the USA
"Alison"	1979	—	30	—	—	—	—	—	—	—	66		Living in the USA
"—" denotes a recording that did not chart or was not released in that territory.

=== 1980s ===
List of singles, with selected chart positions, showing other relevant details
Title	Year	Peak chart positions										Certifications	Album
Title	Year	US	US AC	US Cou.	AUS	CAN	CAN AC	CAN Cou.	ND	NZ	UK	Certifications	Album
"How Do I Make You"	1980	10	—	—	19	15	—	—	—	30	—		Mad Love
"Hurt So Bad"	1980	8	25	—	—	17	37	—	43	—	—		Mad Love
"I Can't Let Go"	1980	31	48	—	—	28	—	—	—	—	—		Mad Love
"Girls Talk"	1980	—	—	—	—	—	—	—	—	—	—		Mad Love
"Get Closer"	1982	29	—	—	70	30	—	—	43	—	—		Get Closer
"I Knew You When"	1982	37	29	84	36	—	17	—	—	—	90		Get Closer
"Tell Him"	1982	—	—	—	—	—	—	—	—	—	—		Get Closer
"Easy for You to Say"	1983	54	7	—	—	—	8	—	—	—	—		Get Closer
"What's New"	1983	53	5	—	87	—	1	—	—	—	—		What's New
"I've Got a Crush on You"	1984	—	7	—	—	—	1	—	—	—	—		What's New
"Someone to Watch Over Me"	1984	—	—	—	—	—	—	—	—	—	—		What's New
"Skylark"	1984	101	12	—	—	—	5	—	—	—	—		Lush Life
"Falling in Love Again"	1984	—	—	—	—	—	—	—	—	—	—		Lush Life
"When I Fall in Love"	1985	—	24	—	—	—	—	—	—	—	—		Lush Life
"When You Wish Upon a Star"	1986	—	32	—	—	—	—	—	—	—	—		For Sentimental Reasons
"I Love You for Sentimental Reasons"	1986	—	—	—	—	—	—	—	—	—	—		For Sentimental Reasons
"Somewhere Out There" (with James Ingram)	1986	2	4	—	31	2	2	—	8	—	8	RIAA: Gold	An American Tail
"To Know Him Is to Love Him" (with Emmylou Harris and Dolly Parton)	1987	—	—	1	54	—	—	1	62	—	—		Trio
"Telling Me Lies" (with Emmylou Harris and Dolly Parton)	1987	—	35	3	—	—	—	6	—	—	—		Trio
"Those Memories of You" (with Emmylou Harris and Dolly Parton)	1987	—	—	5	—	—	—	1	—	—	—		Trio
"Wildflowers" (with Emmylou Harris and Dolly Parton)	1988	—	—	6	—	—	—	8	—	—	—		Trio
"Don't Know Much" (with Aaron Neville)	1989	2	1	—	2	4	1	—	6	4	2	ARIA: Platinum; BPI: Silver; RIAA: Gold	Cry Like a Rainstorm, Howl Like the Wind
"All My Life" (with Aaron Neville)	1989	11	1	—	57	10	1	—	28	—	96		Cry Like a Rainstorm, Howl Like the Wind
"—" denotes a recording that did not chart or was not released in that territory.

=== 1990s–2000s ===
List of singles, with selected chart positions, showing other relevant details
Title	Year	Peak chart positions						Album
Title	Year	US	US AC	US Lat.	CAN	CAN AC	CAN Cou.	Album
"When Something Is Wrong with My Baby" (with Aaron Neville)	1990	78	5	—	29	10	—	Cry Like a Rainstorm, Howl Like the Wind
"Adios"	1990	—	9	—	34	9	—	Cry Like a Rainstorm, Howl Like the Wind
"Dreams to Dream"	1991	—	13	—	69	18	—	An American Tail: Fievel Goes West
"Gritenme Piedras del Campo"	1992	—	—	15	—	—	—	Mas Canciones
"Frenesi"	1992	—	—	7	—	—	—	Frenesí
"Perfidia"	1992	—	—	7	—	—	—	Frenesí
"Entre Abismos"	1993	—	—	33	—	—	—	Frenesí
"Heartbeats Accelerating"	1993	— (Note: "Heartbeats Accelerating" did not enter the Hot 100, but peaked at number 16 on Bubbling Under Hot 100 Singles, which acts as a 25-song extension of the Hot 100.)	31	—	17	19	—	Winter Light
"Adónde Voy"	1993	—	—	33	—	—	—	Winter Light
"Anyone Who Had a Heart"	1993	—	—	—	—	—	—	Winter Light
"Winter Light"	1993	—	—	—	—	—	—	Winter Light
"Oh No Not My Baby"	1994	—	35	—	33	29	—	Winter Light
"A River for Him"	1994	—	—	—	—	—	—	Winter Light
"The Blue Train"	1995	—	31	—	42	7	—	Feels Like Home
"The Waiting"	1995	—	—	—	—	—	—	Feels Like Home
"Walk On"	1995	—	—	—	—	—	62	Feels Like Home
"High Sierra"	1995	—	—	—	—	—	—	Feels Like Home
"Feels Like Home" (with Emmylou Harris)	1995	—	—	—	—	43	—	Feels Like Home
"A Dream Is a Wish Your Heart Makes"	1995	— (Note: "A Dream Is a Wish Your Heart Makes" did not enter the Hot 100, but peaked at number 1 on Bubbling Under Hot 100 Singles, which acts as a 25-song extension of the Hot 100)	—	—	—	—	—	The Music of Cinderella
"Dedicated to the One I Love"	1996	—	—	—	—	45	—	Dedicated to the One I Love
"When We Ran"	1998	—	—	—	—	—	—	We Ran
"High Sierra" (with Emmylou Harris and Dolly Parton)	1999	—	—	—	—	—	90	Trio II
"After the Gold Rush" (with Emmylou Harris and Dolly Parton)	1999	—	—	—	—	—	—	Trio II
"For a Dancer" (with Emmylou Harris)	1999	—	—	—	—	—	—	Western Wall: The Tucson Sessions
"Sweet Spot" (with Emmylou Harris)	1999	—	—	—	—	—	—	Western Wall: The Tucson Sessions
"Walk Away Renee" (with Ann Savoy)	2006	—	—	—	—	—	—	Adieu False Heart
"—" denotes a recording that did not chart or was not released in that territory.

== As a featured artist ==
List of singles, with selected chart positions, showing other relevant details
Title	Year	Peak chart positions						Album
Title	Year	US	US AC	AUS	CAN	ND	NZ	Album
"Different Drum" (Stone Poneys featuring Linda Ronstadt)	1967	13	—	9	12	—	5	Evergreen, Volume 2
"Some of Shelly's Blues" (Stone Poneys featuring Linda Ronstadt)	1968	—	—	—	—	—	—	Linda Ronstadt, Stone Poneys and Friends, Vol. III
"An American Dream" (The Dirt Band featuring Linda Ronstadt) (Note: Only the Dutch version of "An American Dream" credits Ronstadt on the single release.)	1979	13	16	12	3	3	39	An American Dream
"Close Your Eyes" (Aaron Neville featuring Linda Ronstadt)	1990	90	38	—	—	—	—	Warm Your Heart
"—" denotes a recording that did not chart or was not released in that territory.

== Promotional singles ==
List of promotional singles, showing all relevant details
Title	Year	Album	Ref.
"Living Like a Fool"	1977	—N/a	
"Under African Skies" (with Paul Simon)	1986	—N/a	
"Por Un Amor"	1987	Canciones de Mi Padre	
"Y Andale"	1987	Canciones de Mi Padre	
"Tu Solo Tu"	1988	Canciones de Mi Padre	
"El Gustito"	1991	Mas Canciones	
"El Crucifijo De Piedra"	1992	Mas Canciones	
"You're No Good" (Live)	2019	Live in Hollywood	

== Other charted songs ==
List of songs, with selected chart positions, showing other relevant details
Title	Year	Peak chart positions								Album	Notes
Title	Year	US	US AC	US Cou.	US Dig.	US Rock Dig.	CAN	CAN AC	CAN Cou.	Album	Notes
"I Can't Help It (If I'm Still in Love with You)"	1974	—	—	2	—	—	—	—	6	Heart Like a Wheel	(Note: Released as the B-side to "You're No Good".)
"It Doesn't Matter Anymore"	1975	47	20	54	—	—	83	23	—	Heart Like a Wheel	(Note: Released as the B-side to "When Will I Be Loved".)
"The Sweetest Gift" (with Emmylou Harris)	1975	—	—	12	—	—	—	—	—	Prisoner in Disguise	(Note: Released as the B-side to "The Tracks of My Tears".)
"Crazy"	1976	—	—	6	—	—	—	—	2	Hasten Down the Wind	(Note: Released as the B-side to "Someone to Lay Down Beside Me".)
"I Never Will Marry"	1978	—	30	8	—	—	—	39	16	Simple Dreams	(Note: Released as the B-side to "Tumbling Dice".)
"Rambler Gambler"	1980	—	—	42	—	—	—	—	49	—N/a	(Note: Released as the B-side to "How Do I Make You".)
"Sometimes You Just Can't Win"	1982	—	—	27	—	—	—	—	—	Get Closer	(Note: Released as the B-side to "Get Closer".)
"Long, Long Time"	2023	—	—	—	4	1	—	—	—	Silk Purse	(Note: In 2023, "Long, Long Time" charted on several Billboard charts after being featured in the American television series The Last of Us.)
"—" denotes a recording that did not chart or was not released in that territory.
