= Greatest Hits (Linda Ronstadt album) =

Greatest hits album by Linda Ronstadt
- Released: December 1, 1976
- Recorded: 1967, 1970, 1973-1976
- Genres: Rock, country rock, folk rock
- Length: 37:33
- Label: Asylum
- Producer: various

Linda Ronstadt chronology
| Hasten Down the Wind (1976) | Greatest Hits (1976) | Simple Dreams (1977) |

Professional ratings
Review scores
| Source | Rating |
|---|---|
| Allmusic | 4.5/5 stars |
| Christgau's Record Guide | B+ |
| The Rolling Stone Album Guide | 4/5 stars |
| Sounds | 5/5 stars |

Greatest Hits is the first compilation album by American singer Linda Ronstadt, released on December 1, 1976 through Asylum. It includes material from both her Capitol Records and Asylum Records output, and goes back to 1967 for The Stone Poneys' hit "Different Drum."

It remains the biggest-selling album of Ronstadt's career, being certified seven times Platinum (over 7 million US copies shipped) by the Recording Industry Association of America in America alone, with 1.87 million units consumed after 1991 when SoundScan started tracking sales. It peaked at No. 6 on the main Billboard album chart and also reached No. 2 on Billboard's Top Country Albums chart, where it remained for over three years.

The album was criticized by the Rolling Stone Record Guide for being "premature," as Ronstadt continued to have record-breaking mainstream successes for many years following this release. By the time this collection came out, however, Ronstadt had already been recording hit records (as a solo artist and with the Stone Poneys) for a decade, and there were many examples of other artists releasing greatest hits albums much sooner, such as Elvis Presley.

In terms of being released while the performer was still in the midst of their career, this collection is unusual for a major artist in that it compiled works from two unrelated labels thanks to, as the sleeve states, a "special arrangement" between Asylum and Capitol; this overlap mirrors the situation in which Ronstadt briefly alternated releasing albums between Capitol and Asylum in 1973–74 in order to fulfil her contract with Capitol.

== Track listing ==
=== Original release ===
Side one
| No. | Title | Writer(s) | Original album | Length |
|---|---|---|---|---|
| 1. | "You're No Good" | Clint Ballard Jr. | Heart Like a Wheel, 1974 | 3:44 |
| 2. | "Silver Threads and Golden Needles" | Jack Rhodes, Dick Reynolds | Don't Cry Now, 1973 | 2:20 |
| 3. | "Desperado" | Glenn Frey, Don Henley | Don't Cry Now | 3:30 |
| 4. | "Love Is a Rose" | Neil Young | Prisoner in Disguise, 1975 | 2:46 |
| 5. | "That'll Be the Day" | Jerry Allison, Buddy Holly, Norman Petty | Hasten Down the Wind, 1976 | 2:32 |
| 6. | "Long, Long Time" | Gary White | Silk Purse, 1970 | 4:21 |

Side two
| No. | Title | Writer(s) | Original album | Length |
|---|---|---|---|---|
| 1. | "Different Drum" (with The Stone Poneys) | Mike Nesmith | Evergreen, Volume 2, 1967 | 2:45 |
| 2. | "When Will I Be Loved" | Phil Everly | Heart Like a Wheel | 2:05 |
| 3. | "Love Has No Pride" | Eric Kaz, Libby Titus | Don't Cry Now | 4:10 |
| 4. | "Heat Wave" | Holland–Dozier–Holland | Prisoner in Disguise | 2:46 |
| 5. | "It Doesn't Matter Anymore" | Paul Anka | Heart Like a Wheel | 3:26 |
| 6. | "Tracks of My Tears" | Smokey Robinson, Warren Moore, Marv Tarplin | Prisoner in Disguise | 3:12 |

=== CD reissue ===
The CD reissue of the album was compiled with Ronstadt's second greatest hits collection and released by Rhino records in 2007 as Greatest Hits, Vol. 1 & 2.

| No. | Title | Length |
|---|---|---|
| 1. | "You're No Good" | 3:40 |
| 2. | "Silver Threads and Golden Needles" | 2:20 |
| 3. | "Desperado" | 3:30 |
| 4. | "Love is a Rose" | 2:46 |
| 5. | "That'll Be the Day" | 2:32 |
| 6. | "Long, Long Time" | 4:21 |
| 7. | "Different Drum" | 2:45 |
| 8. | "When Will I Be Loved" | 2:05 |
| 9. | "Love Has No Pride" | 4:10 |
| 10. | "Heat Wave" | 2:46 |
| 11. | "It Doesn't Matter Anymore" | 3:26 |
| 12. | "Tracks of My Tears" | 3:12 |

| No. | Title | Length |
|---|---|---|
| 13. | "It's So Easy" | 2:26 |
| 14. | "I Can't Let Go" | 2:43 |
| 15. | "Hurt So Bad" | 3:12 |
| 16. | "Blue Bayou" | 3:54 |
| 17. | "How Do I Make You" | 2:21 |
| 18. | "Back in the U.S.A." | 3:02 |
| 19. | "Ooo Baby Baby" | 3:18 |
| 20. | "Poor Poor Pitiful Me" | 3:41 |
| 21. | "Tumbling Dice" | 3:05 |
| 22. | "Just One Look" | 3:15 |
| 23. | "Someone to Lay Down Beside Me" | 3:58 |

== Charts ==
=== Weekly charts ===
| Chart (1976–1977) | Peak position |
|---|---|
| Australia (Kent Music Report) | 22 |
| Canada Top Albums/CDs (RPM) | 3 |
| New Zealand Albums (RMNZ) | 18 |
| UK Albums (Official Charts) | 24 |
| US Billboard 200 | 6 |
| US Top Country Albums (Billboard) | 2 |

=== Year-end charts ===
| Chart (1977) | Position |
|---|---|
| Canada Top Albums/CDs (RPM) | 29 |
| US Billboard 200 | 20 |
| US Top Country Albums (Billboard) | 8 |
| Chart (1978) | Position |
| US Billboard 200 | 66 |
| US Top Country Albums (Billboard) | 19 |

== Certifications ==
| Region | Certification | Certified units/sales |
|---|---|---|
| Australia (ARIA) | 4× Platinum | 280,000^{^} |
| Canada (Music Canada) | Platinum | 100,000^{^} |
| Hong Kong (IFPI Hong Kong) | Gold | 10,000^{*} |
| United States (RIAA) | 7× Platinum | 7,000,000^{^} |
^{*} Sales figures based on certification alone.^{^} Shipments figures based on certification alone.

== Personnel ==
From the Liner Notes on the Original Vinyl Album.

- Peter Asher: Cabasa, Cowbell, Trombone and Shaker, Hand Claps, Wood Block, and Percussion.
- Ed Black: Guitar, Steel Guitar
- Michael Botts: Drums
- Mike Bowden: Bass
- Richard Bowden: Electric Guitar
- John Boylan: Keyboards
- Richard Burden: Guitar
- John Connor: Harmonica
- Dan Dugmore: Steel Guitar
- Kenny Edwards: Acoustic Guitar, Bass, Backing Vocal
- Chris Ethridge: Bass
- Jim Fadden: Harmonica
- Don Francisco: Backing Vocals
- Andrew Gold: Acoustic Guitar, Backing Vocal, Drums, Electric Guitar, Keyboards, Percussion, Tambourine, Piano, Arp, Congas, Hand Claps
- Jim Gordon: Saxophone
- Gib Guilbeau: Fiddle
- Ginger Holliday: Backing Vocal
- Mary Holliday: Backing Vocal
- Andy Johnson: Electric Guitar
- Mac Johnson: Trumpet
- David Kemper: Drums
- Clyde King: Backing Vocals
- Sneaky Pete Kleinow: Steel Guitar
- Danny Kortchmar: Electric Guitar
- Russ Kunkel: Drums
- Bernie Leadon: Acoustic Guitar
- Daryl Leonard: Trumpet
- David Lindley: Fiddle
- Gail Martin: Trombone
- Shirley Matthews: Backing Vocals
- Marty McCall: Backing Vocals
- Mickey McGee: Drums
- Weldon Myrick: Steel Guitar
- Spooner Oldham: Piano
- Herb Pedersen: Acoustic Guitar, Backing Vocal, Banjo
- Norbert Putnam: Bass, Harpsichord
- Don Randi: Harpsichord
- Lyle Ritz: Concertmaster
- Linda Ronstadt: Vocals, Tambourine, Hand Claps, Backing Vocals
- John David Souther: Guitar
- Buddy Spicher: Fiddle
- Dennis St. John: Drums
- Nino Tempo: Saxophone
- Al Viola: Acoustic Guitar
- Waddy: Electric Guitar
- Pete Wade: Guitar
- Bob Warford: Acoustic Guitar

== Producers ==
- Peter Asher: 1, 4, 5, 8,10,11,12
- John Boylan: 9
- John David Souther: 2,3
- Elliot F. Mazer: 6
- Nikolas Venet: 7

== Release history ==
Release history and formats for Greatest Hits
| Region | Date | Format | Label | Ref. |
|---|---|---|---|---|
| North America | December 1, 1976 | LP; cassette | Asylum Records | |

== See also ==
- List of best-selling albums in the United States
