= Greatest Hits, Volume 2 (Linda Ronstadt album) =

Greatest hits album by Linda Ronstadt
- Released: October 1980
- Recorded: 1976–1980
- Genres: Rock; country rock; rhythm and blues
- Length: 36:00
- Label: Asylum
- Producer: Various

Linda Ronstadt chronology
Mad Love (1980)	Greatest Hits, Volume 2 (1980)	Get Closer (1982)

Professional ratings
Review scores
Source	Rating
Allmusic	4.5/5 stars
Billboard	(unrated)
The Rolling Stone Album Guide	3/5 stars

Greatest Hits, Volume 2 is a hits compilation album from American singer Linda Ronstadt. It was released in late 1980 on Asylum Records. The record mostly covers Ronstadt's more uptempo singles. The release has sold close to two million copies in the United States alone and was the superstar's eighth consecutive Platinum-certified album.

== Track listing ==
=== Original release ===
Side one
No.	Title	Writer(s)	Original album	Length
1.	"It's So Easy"	Buddy Holly, Norman Petty	Simple Dreams, 1977	2:26
2.	"I Can't Let Go"	Chip Taylor, Al Gorgoni	Mad Love, 1980	2:43
3.	"Hurt So Bad"	Teddy Randazzo, Bobby Weinstein, Bobby Hart	Mad Love	3:12
4.	"Blue Bayou"	Roy Orbison, Joe Melson	Simple Dreams	3:54
5.	"How Do I Make You"	Billy Steinberg	Mad Love	2:21
6.	"Back in the U.S.A."	Chuck Berry	Living in the USA, 1978	3:02

Side two
No.	Title	Writer(s)	Original album	Length
1.	"Ooh Baby Baby"	William "Smokey" Robinson, Warren Moore	Living in the USA	3:18
2.	"Poor Poor Pitiful Me"	Warren Zevon	Simple Dreams	3:41
3.	"Tumbling Dice"	Mick Jagger, Keith Richards	Simple Dreams	3:05
4.	"Just One Look"	Gregory Carroll, Doris Payne	Living in the USA	3:21
5.	"Someone to Lay Down Beside Me"	Karla Bonoff	Hasten Down the Wind, 1976	4:28

=== CD reissue ===
The CD reissue of the album was compiled with Ronstadt's earlier greatest hits collection and released by Rhino records in 2007 as Greatest Hits, Vol. 1 & 2.

No.	Title	Length
1.	"You're No Good"	3:40
2.	"Silver Threads and Golden Needles"	2:20
3.	"Desperado"	3:30
4.	"Love is a Rose"	2:46
5.	"That'll Be the Day"	2:32
6.	"Long, Long Time"	4:21
7.	"Different Drum"	2:45
8.	"When Will I Be Loved"	2:05
9.	"Love Has No Pride"	4:10
10.	"Heat Wave"	2:46
11.	"It Doesn't Matter Anymore"	3:26
12.	"Tracks of My Tears"	3:12

No.	Title	Length
13.	"It's So Easy"	2:26
14.	"I Can't Let Go"	2:43
15.	"Hurt So Bad"	3:12
16.	"Blue Bayou"	3:54
17.	"How Do I Make You"	2:21
18.	"Back in the U.S.A."	3:02
19.	"Ooo Baby Baby"	3:18
20.	"Poor Poor Pitiful Me"	3:41
21.	"Tumbling Dice"	3:05
22.	"Just One Look"	3:15
23.	"Someone to Lay Down Beside Me"	4:28

== Charts ==
Chart (1980/81)	Peak position
Australia (Kent Music Report)	53
Canada Top Albums/CDs (RPM)	39
New Zealand Albums (RMNZ)	32
US Billboard 200	26

== Certifications ==
Region	Certification	Certified units/sales
United States (RIAA)	Platinum	1,000,000^{^}
^{^} Shipments figures based on certification alone.

== Release history ==
Release history and formats for Greatest Hits, Volume Two
Region	Date	Format	Label	Ref.
North America	October 1980	LP; cassette	Asylum Records	
