= Lose Again =

Single by Linda Ronstadt

from the album Hasten Down the Wind
- B-side: "Lo Siento Mi Vida"
- Released: May 1977
- Recorded: March 1976
- Studio: The Sound Factory
- Genre: Country rock; pop rock
- Length: 3:34
- Label: Asylum
- Songwriter: Karla Bonoff
- Producer: Peter Asher

Linda Ronstadt singles chronology
"Someone to Lay Down Beside Me" (1976)	"Lose Again" (1977)	"Blue Bayou" (1977)

"Lose Again" is a song written by Karla Bonoff that was originally recorded by American singer Linda Ronstadt. First released on her album Hasten Down the Wind, "Lose Again" was then spawned as the third single from the disc in May 1977. The song was among Ronstadt's lowest-charting singles in the US and Canada, but received critical acclaim from Cashbox following its release.

== Background, recording and content ==
Linda Ronstadt reached her commercial breakthrough after embedding a country rock formula into her recordings. Her 1974 album Heart Like a Wheel spawned the popular singles "You're No Good" and "When Will I Be Loved". The success and musical style was repeated on both 1975's Prisoner in Disguise and 1976's Hasten Down the Wind. Hasten Down the Wind included the new song "Lose Again". It was one several album tracks penned by Karla Bonoff.

Bonoff was an up-and-coming singer-songwriter who was yet to have her own successful career in music. Ronstadt first heard the demo of "Lose Again" from her band member Kenny Edwards, who was dating Bonoff at the time. Ronstadt liked it enough to record it for Hasten Down the Wind. Bonoff eventually played Ronstadt several more songs which would later appear on Hasten Down the Wind. The track was recorded in March 1976 at The Sound Factory, a studio located in Hollywood, California. The track was produced by Peter Asher.

== Release, reception and chart performance ==
"Lose Again" was first an album track on Hasten Down the Wind, which was released in August 1976. Then, it was issued as the third single from the album by Asylum Records in May 1977. The label issued it as a seven-inch vinyl single. It was backed on the B-side by the Spanish language song "Lo Siento Mi Vida". Cashbox called "Lose Again" "One of the best from Hasten Down The Wind", but also noted that the "great sensitivity" of her singing "makes the phrase "belt it out" so inappropriate". The single debuted on the US Billboard Hot 100 in June 1977 and spent five weeks there. It would reach the number 76 position, Ronstadt's lowest charting Hot 100 single up to that point. It also debuted on the US Billboard adult contemporary chart in June 1977 and reached number 43 that month. It was Ronstadt's lowest-charting single on the adult contemporary chart up to that point. It also reached the number 42 position on Canada's RPM Adult Contemporary chart, becoming her lowest-charting single on that chart.

== Track listing ==
7" vinyl single

- "Lose Again" – 3:34
- "Lo Siento Mi Vida" – 3:58

== Charts ==
=== Weekly charts ===
Weekly chart performance for "Lose Again"
Chart (1977)	Peak position
Canada Adult Contemporary (RPM)	42
US Adult Contemporary (Billboard)	43
US Billboard Hot 100	76
