= Someone to Lay Down Beside Me =

Single by Linda Ronstadt

from the album Hasten Down the Wind
- B-side: "Crazy"
- Released: November 1976
- Recorded: March 1976
- Studio: The Sound Factory
- Genre: Country rock; pop rock
- Length: 3:58
- Label: Asylum
- Songwriter: Karla Bonoff
- Producer: Peter Asher

Linda Ronstadt singles chronology
"That'll Be the Day" (1976)	"Someone to Lay Down Beside Me" (1976)	"Lose Again" (1977)

"Someone to Lay Down Beside Me" is a song written by Karla Bonoff that was originally recorded by American singer Linda Ronstadt. First included as an album track on 1976's Hasten Down the Wind, it was released as a single by Asylum Records in November 1976. The song was met positive reviews from Billboard, Cashbox and AllMusic. The single charted in both the US and Canada, along with their corresponding adult contemporary charts.

== Background, recording and content ==
In the mid 1970s, Linda Ronstadt brought forth a style of country rock into the mainstream. She broke through commercially with the 1974 album Heart Like a Wheel. It spawned the successful singles "You're No Good", "When Will I Be Loved" and "It Doesn't Matter Anymore". It was followed by 1975's Prisoner in Disguise and 1976's Hasten Down the Wind, which both followed a similar country rock formula. Hasten Down the Wind featured the new track "Someone to Lay Down Beside Me". It was written by Karla Bonoff.

Bonoff was an up and coming singer-songwriter. Ronstadt heard a demo of a different Bonoff song called "Lose Again", which prompted her to hear more of Bonoff's repertoire. Ronstadt was then presented with "Someone to Lay Down Beside Me". Impressed by the song, Ronstadt chose to record it. "Someone to Lay Down Beside Me" centers on the need for a person to have a quality romantic relationship rather than having someone who can fulfill feelings of loneliness. The track was recorded in March 1976 at The Sound Factory, a studio located in Hollywood, California. The track was produced by Peter Asher.

== Critical reception ==
"Someone to Lay Down Beside Me" was given positive reviews from critics. Billboard named it among its "Top Single Picks" in November 1976. Although the publication called it "an unusual choice for a Ronstadt single", they found it to be a "dark hued ballad with deeply provocative lyrics." Cashbox called the song "a strong melodic ballad" and noted that "Ronstadt's vocal strikes deeply and leaves no doubt that this will be another hit record." Although no formal review was given, AllMusic's Stephen Thomas Erlewine named the song one of Hasten Down the Wind's "Track Picks".

== Release and chart performance ==
"Someone to Lay Down Beside Me" was first an album track on Hasten Down the Wind, which was released in August 1976. Then, it was issued as a single in November 1976 by Asylum Records. The label issued it as a seven-inch vinyl single. It was backed on the B-side by a cover of Patsy Cline's "Crazy". The single debuted on the US Billboard Hot 100 in December 1976. Spending 11 weeks there, it climbed to the number 42 position in January 1977. It was Ronstadt's sixth single reach a position outside the Hot 100 top 40. It also debuted on the US Billboard adult contemporary chart in December 1976 and spent seven weeks there. In January 1977, the single reached the number 38 position. It was Ronstadt's lowest-charting single on the adult contemporary chart up to that point. It reached similar positions on the Canadian RPM Top Singles chart, peaking at number 58. It was Ronstadt's fifth single to chart outside the top 40 there. It also reached number 37 on the RPM Adult Contemporary chart, becoming her lowest-charting single up to that point.

== Track listing ==
7" vinyl single

- "Someone to Lay Down Beside Me" – 3:58
- "Crazy" – 3:58

== Charts ==
=== Weekly charts ===
Weekly chart performance for "Someone to Lay Down Beside Me"
Chart (1976–1977)	Peak position
Canada Top Singles (RPM)	58
Canada Adult Contemporary (RPM)	37
US Adult Contemporary (Billboard)	38
US Billboard Hot 100	42
