= Simple Dreams =

Studio album by Linda Ronstadt
- Released: September 6, 1977
- Recorded: May 23–July 22, 1977
- Studio: Sound Factory (Hollywood)
- Genre: Rock, country rock, folk rock
- Length: 31:49
- Label: Asylum
- Producer: Peter Asher

Linda Ronstadt chronology
Greatest Hits (1976)	Simple Dreams (1977)	Living in the USA (1978)

Singles from Simple Dreams
- 1. "Blue Bayou" Released: August 23, 1977; 2. "It's So Easy" Released: September 1977; 3. "Poor Poor Pitiful Me" Released: January 1978; 4. "Tumbling Dice" Released: April 1978; 5. "I Never Will Marry" Released: April 1978

Simple Dreams is the eighth studio album by the American singer Linda Ronstadt, released in 1977 by Asylum Records. It includes several of her best-known songs, including her cover of the Rolling Stones song "Tumbling Dice" (featured in the film FM) and her version of the Roy Orbison song "Blue Bayou", which earned her a Grammy nomination for Record of the Year. The album also contains covers of the Buddy Holly song "It's So Easy!" (a top-5 hit) and the Warren Zevon songs "Poor Poor Pitiful Me" (another top-40 hit) and "Carmelita".

It was the best-selling studio album of her career, and at the time was the second best-selling album by a female artist (behind only Carole King's Tapestry). It was her first album since Don't Cry Now without long-time musical collaborator Andrew Gold, though it features several of the other Laurel Canyon-based session musicians who appeared on her prior albums, including guitarists Dan Dugmore and Waddy Wachtel, bassist Kenny Edwards, and producer and multi-instrumentalist Peter Asher.

== Release and promotion ==
The album was released by Asylum in the LP, 8-track tape & cassette Tape format in September 1977 (catalogue number 6E-104, TC8-104, and TC5-104). In 1986, Asylum released the album in the CD format (2-104). The album has never been out of print.

One of the most successful albums of Ronstadt's career, Simple Dreams spent five successive weeks at number 1 on the Billboard album chart in late 1977, displacing Fleetwood Mac's Rumours after it had held that position for a record-breaking 29 weeks. It also knocked Elvis Presley out of the number 1 position on the Billboard Country Albums chart after "The King" had held it for fifteen consecutive weeks following his death in August. Simple Dreams was Ronstadt's fifth consecutive million-selling platinum album and sold over 3½ million copies in less than a year in the United States alone—a record for a female artist. Among female recording artists at that time, only Carole King, with her album Tapestry, had sold more copies of one album.

The album was such a success that Ronstadt became the first female artist—and the first act overall since the Beatles—to have two singles in the top five at the same time: the Platinum-certified "Blue Bayou" (#3 Pop, #3 Adult contemporary, and #2 Country) and "It's So Easy" (#5 Pop). "It's So Easy" was originally recorded by Buddy Holly and The Crickets in 1958 but had failed to chart in its original version. It was Ronstadt's second cover of a Holly song to become a hit in as many years; she had taken a rousing cover of "That'll Be the Day" to #11 Pop in 1976, using a similar arrangement.

The album includes songs by Warren Zevon, Eric Kaz, and JD Souther, as well as the Rolling Stones' "Tumbling Dice". Ronstadt was joined by Dolly Parton on the traditional ballad "I Never Will Marry", which became a Top 10 Country hit during the summer of 1978. (Ronstadt, Parton, and Emmylou Harris were also working on an ill-fated collaborative project around this same time, but nine years would pass before the release of their first Trio album.)

Ronstadt also recorded a Spanish-language version of "Blue Bayou" entitled "Lago Azul" only released as a single in 1978 (Asylum E-45464). The album's 40th anniversary reissue in 2017, augmented by the addition of four live tracks, likewise omits this recording.

Originally, the cover photograph was to show Ronstadt dressed in a mini-slip and seated in front of multiple mirrors. Uncomfortable with the physical exposure, she changed into a robe, and the picture was made artificially grainy. A retouched photo from the original photo sessions was included on the inner sleeve of her platinum-plus album Greatest Hits, Volume 2, released in 1980. At the 20th Grammy Awards, John Kosh won the Grammy Award for Best Recording Package for Simple Dreams.

== Critical reception ==
Professional ratings
Review scores
Source	Rating
AllMusic	4.5/5 stars
Christgau's Record Guide	B+
The Rolling Stone Album Guide	4/5 stars

Rolling Stone stated: "Throughout Simple Dreams (in which Ronstadt and Asher wisely have scaled down the production), the singer evokes a bittersweet world of disappointments, fantasies and cheerfully brazen assertions." Reviewing in Christgau's Record Guide: Rock Albums of the Seventies (1981), Robert Christgau wrote:

"In which Andrew Gold goes off and Pursues His Solo Career, enabling Ronstadt to hire herself a rock and roll band. She's still too predictable—imagine how terse and eloquent 'Blue Bayou' would seem if instead of turning up the volume midway through she just hit one high note at the end—but she's also a pop eclectic for our time, as comfortable with Mick Jagger as with Dolly Parton, interpreting Roy Orbison as easily as Buddy Holly. Even her portrayal of a junkie seeking succor from Warren Zevon's 'Carmelita; isn't totally ridiculous. And I admit it—she looks great in a Dodger jacket."

== Accolades ==
"Blue Bayou" was nominated for the Grammy Award for Record of the Year in early 1978. It also earned Ronstadt a Grammy nomination for Best Pop Vocal Performance, Female, alongside Barbra Streisand, Dolly Parton, Carly Simon, and Debby Boone, while the album was nominated for the Grammy Award for Best Engineered Album, Non-Classical (Val Garay). Peter Asher also won the Grammy Award for Producer of the Year, Non-Classical in-part for his work on this album.

== Track listing ==
Side one
No.	Title	Writer(s)	Length
1.	"It's So Easy"	Buddy Holly, Norman Petty	2:27
2.	"Carmelita"	Warren Zevon	3:07
3.	"Simple Man, Simple Dream"	JD Souther	3:12
4.	"Sorrow Lives Here"	Eric Kaz	2:57
5.	"I Never Will Marry"	Traditional	3:12

Side two
No.	Title	Writer(s)	Length
1.	"Blue Bayou"	Roy Orbison, Joe Melson	3:57
2.	"Poor Poor Pitiful Me"	Warren Zevon	3:42
3.	"Maybe I'm Right"	Waddy Wachtel	3:05
4.	"Tumbling Dice"	Mick Jagger, Keith Richards	3:05
5.	"Old Paint"	Traditional	3:05
Total length:			31:49

== Personnel ==
- Linda Ronstadt – lead vocals, backing vocals (1, 10), acoustic guitar (5, 10), arrangements (5, 10)
- Don Grolnick – clavinet (1, 7), organ (2), electric piano (3, 6), acoustic piano (4, 9)
- Dan Dugmore – acoustic guitar (1, 2, 7), steel guitar (3, 6), electric guitar (9)
- Waddy Wachtel – electric guitar (1, 2, 7–9), backing vocals (1, 2, 9), acoustic guitar (2, 5, 6, 8), slide guitar solo (9)
- Mike Auldridge – dobro (5, 10)
- Kenny Edwards – bass guitar (1–3, 6–9), backing vocals (1, 2, 6, 7, 9, 10), mandolin (6)
- Rick Marotta – drums (1–3, 6, 7, 9), syndrums (2, 6, 7), shaker (3), cowbell (6)
- Steve Forman – marimba (6)
- Peter Asher – backing vocals (1, 8, 10), tambourine (7), maracas (7)
- David Campbell – string arrangements (3), viola (3)
- Dennis Karmazyn – cello (3)
- Charles Veal – violin (3)
- Richard Feves – double bass (3)
- Dolly Parton – harmony vocals (5)
- Don Henley – backing vocals (6)
- Larry Hagler – backing vocals (7)
- JD Souther – backing vocals (8)
- Herb Pedersen – backing vocals (10)

=== Production ===
- Producer – Peter Asher
- Recorded and Mixed by Val Garay
- Recording and Mix Assistant – Mark Howlett
- Mastered by Doug Sax at The Mastering Lab (Hollywood, CA).
- Art Direction and Design – Kosh
- Photography – Jim Shea

== Charts ==
=== Weekly charts ===
Chart (1977–78)	Peak position
Australia (Kent Music Report)	1
Canadian Albums Chart	1
Dutch Albums Chart	8
French SNEP Albums Chart	15
Japanese Oricon LPs Chart	38
New Zealand Albums Chart	2
Swedish Albums Chart	46
UK Albums Chart	15
U.S. Billboard Pop Albums	1
U.S. Billboard Country Albums	1

=== Year-end charts ===
Chart (1977)	Position
Australian Albums Chart	27
Canadian Albums Chart	18

Chart (1978)	Position
Australian Albums Chart	4
Canadian Albums Chart	54
Dutch Albums Chart	63
French Albums Chart	31
New Zealand Albums (RMNZ)	11
U.S. Billboard 200	8

== Certifications and sales ==
Region	Certification	Certified units/sales
Australia (ARIA)	5× Platinum	350,000^{^}
Canada (Music Canada)	2× Platinum	200,000^{^}
Hong Kong (IFPI Hong Kong)	Platinum	20,000^{*}
Japan	—	42,540
New Zealand (RMNZ)	Platinum	15,000^{^}
United States (RIAA)	3× Platinum	3,000,000^{^}
^{*} Sales figures based on certification alone.^{^} Shipments figures based on certification alone.

== Release history ==
Release history and formats for Simple Dreams
Region	Date	Format	Label	Ref.
North America	September 6, 1977	LP; cassette	Asylum Records	
