= Hasten Down the Wind =

Studio album by Linda Ronstadt
- Released: August 9, 1976
- Recorded: March 1976
- Studio: Sound Factory (Hollywood)
- Genres: Country rock; pop rock
- Length: 41:23
- Label: Asylum
- Producer: Peter Asher

Linda Ronstadt chronology
Prisoner in Disguise (1975)	Hasten Down the Wind (1976)	Greatest Hits (1976)

Singles from Hasten Down the Wind
- 1. "That'll Be the Day" Released: August 1976; 2. "Someone to Lay Down Beside Me" Released: November 1976; 3. "Crazy" Released: November 1976; 4. "Lose Again" Released: May 1977

Professional ratings
Review scores
Source	Rating
AllMusic	3/5 stars
Christgau's Record Guide	B−
Rolling Stone	(average)
The Rolling Stone Album Guide	3/5 stars
Stereo Review	4.5/5 stars

Hasten Down the Wind is the seventh studio album by American singer Linda Ronstadt, released by Asylum Records on August 9, 1976. Becoming her third straight million-selling album, Ronstadt was the first female artist to accomplish this feat. A critical and commercial success, Hasten garnered her second Grammy Award for Pop Vocal Performance, Female at the 19th Grammy Awards ceremony (1977). It represented a slight departure from her previous albums Heart Like a Wheel (1974) and Prisoner in Disguise (1975) in that she chose to showcase new songwriters over the traditional country rock sound she had been producing up to that point. A more serious and poignant album than its predecessors, it won critical acclaim.

Hasten Down the Wind contained two major hit singles: Ronstadt's covers of Buddy Holly's "That'll Be the Day" (US Pop #11, Country #27) and her reworking of the late Patsy Cline's 1961 hit, "Crazy", reaching #6 on the US Country chart in early 1977.

The album showcased songs from artists such as Warren Zevon ("Hasten Down the Wind") and Karla Bonoff ("Someone to Lay Down Beside Me", US #42, Easy Listening #38), both of whom would soon be making a name for themselves in the singer-songwriter world. The album included a cover of a cover: "The Tattler" by Washington Phillips, which Ry Cooder had re-arranged for his 1974 album Paradise and Lunch. The album also included two songs co-written by Ronstadt, including one in Spanish (her first recorded foray into Spanish music, more than a decade before she released her first fully-Spanish album).

Her third album to go platinum, Hasten Down the Wind spent several weeks in the top three of the Billboard album charts. It was also the second of four number 1 Country albums for her.

== Track listing ==
Side one
No.	Title	Writer(s)	Length
1.	"Lose Again"	Karla Bonoff	3:34
2.	"The Tattler"	Ry Cooder, Russ Titelman, Washington Phillips	3:56
3.	"If He's Ever Near"	Karla Bonoff	3:15
4.	"That'll Be the Day"	Jerry Allison, Buddy Holly, Norman Petty	2:32
5.	"Lo Siento Mi Vida"	Linda Ronstadt, Kenny Edwards, Gilbert Ronstadt	3:54
6.	"Hasten Down the Wind"	Warren Zevon	2:40

Side two
No.	Title	Writer(s)	Length
1.	"Rivers of Babylon"	Brent Dowe, Trevor McNaughton	0:52
2.	"Give One Heart"	John Hall, Johanna Hall	4:07
3.	"Try Me Again"	Linda Ronstadt, Andrew Gold	3:59
4.	"Crazy"	Willie Nelson	3:58
5.	"Down So Low"	Tracy Nelson	4:08
6.	"Someone to Lay Down Beside Me"	Karla Bonoff	4:28
Total length:			41:23

== Personnel ==
- Linda Ronstadt – lead vocals, backing vocals (1–3, 8, 12), handclaps (4)
- Andrew Gold – acoustic piano (1, 6, 9, 11-12), organ (1, 3), ARP String Ensemble (1, 3), acoustic guitar (1, 3, 10), finger cymbal (1, 3), backing vocals (1-2, ft 4, 7-8), electric piano (2, 8), sleigh bells (2), handclaps (2), electric guitar (4, 9), bass guitar (5), harmony vocals (5), tambourine (6), lead guitar (8), rhythm guitar (8), cowbell (8), clavinet (12)
- Clarence McDonald – acoustic piano (10)
- Dan Dugmore – electric guitar (1-2, 11, 12), steel guitar (5, 8-10)
- Waddy Wachtel – electric guitar (3-4, 6), acoustic guitar (5), "reggae" lead guitar (8)
- Kenny Edwards – bass guitar (1–4, 6, 8–12), backing vocals (1, 2, 4, 7), mandolin (2), string arrangements (2), acoustic guitar (5), harmony vocals (5)
- Mike Botts – drums (1-2, 4, 8–12)
- Russ Kunkel – drums (3, 5, 6)
- Peter Asher – handclaps (2), shaker (2, 8), tambourine, (2, 3), wood block (4), cowbell (8), backing vocals (8)
- David Campbell – string arrangements and conductor (1-2, 6, 9, 12)
- Charles Veal – concertmaster (1, 9, 12), violin (2), viola (6)
- Dennis Karmazyn – cello (1, 6, 9, 12)
- Ken Yerke – violin (2)
- Richard Feves – double bass (6)
- Paul Polivnick – viola (6)
- Karla Bonoff – backing vocals (3, 12)
- Wendy Waldman – backing vocals (3, 12)
- Don Henley – harmony vocals (6)
- Herb Pedersen – backing vocals (8)
- Pat Henderson – backing vocals (9), choir vocals (11)
- Becky Louis – backing vocals (9), choir vocals (11)
- Sherlie Matthews – backing vocals (9), choir vocals (11)
- Gerald Garrett – choir vocals (11)
- Jim Gilstrap – choir vocals (11)
- Ron Hicklin – choir vocals (11)
- Clydie King – choir vocals (11)
- Bill Thedford – choir vocals (11)

=== Production ===
- Peter Asher – producer
- Val Garay – recording, mixing
- Bernie Grundman – mastering
- Mastered at A&M Mastering Studios (Hollywood, California).
- John Kosh – Art Director and Album Cover Designer
- Ethan Russell – photography

== Charts ==
=== Weekly charts ===
Chart (1976/77)	Peak position
Australia (Kent Music Report)	28
Canada Top Albums/CDs (RPM)	17
Dutch Albums (Album Top 100)	14
UK Albums (Official Charts)	32
US Billboard 200	3

=== Year-end charts ===
Chart (1977)	Position
US Billboard 200	93

== Certifications ==
Region	Certification	Certified units/sales
United Kingdom (BPI)	Silver	60,000^{^}
United States (RIAA)	Platinum	1,000,000^{^}
^{^} Shipments figures based on certification alone.

== Release history ==
Release history and formats for Hasten Down the Wind
Region	Date	Format	Label	Ref.
North America	August 9, 1976	LP; cassette	Asylum Records	
