= Paradise and Lunch =

Studio album by Ry Cooder
- Released: June 1974
- Studio: Warner Brothers Studios, North Hollywood, CA and The Burbank Studios, Burbank, CA
- Genre: Roots rock, blues, folk, Americana
- Length: 36:51
- Label: Reprise
- Producer: Russ Titelman, Lenny Waronker

Ry Cooder chronology
Boomer's Story (1972)	Paradise and Lunch (1974)	Chicken Skin Music (1976)

Music video
- Tattler on YouTube

Professional ratings
Review scores
Source	Rating
Allmusic	4.5/5 stars
Christgau's Record Guide	A−
Rolling Stone	(favorable)
The Rolling Stone Record Guide	5/5 stars
Tom Hull	B+

Paradise and Lunch is the fourth album by roots rock musician Ry Cooder, released on June 8, 1974 on Reprise Records. The album is composed of cover versions of jazz, blues and roots standards and obscurities recorded at the Warner Brothers Studios. The final track, "Ditty Wah Ditty," showcases a duet between Cooder and jazz pianist Earl "Fatha" Hines. It was produced by Russ Titelman and Lenny Waronker. The album reached #167 on the Billboard 200.

The album also includes Cooder's updated arrangement of bluesman Washington Phillips' "The Tattler" that stands out for its guitar playing. It was subsequently covered by Linda Ronstadt on her 1976 album Hasten Down the Wind and by David Soul on his 1977 album Playing To An Audience of One.

In 1990 the album was released on CD, while a remastered version appeared in 2007. It was newly remastered from the original master tapes for a high-resolution SACD in 2017.

== Track listing ==
Side One

1. "Tamp 'Em Up Solid" (Traditional) – 3:19
2. "Tattler" (Washington Phillips, Ry Cooder, Russ Titelman) – 4:14
3. "Married Man's a Fool" (Blind Willie McTell) – 3:10
4. "Jesus on the Mainline" (Traditional) – 4:09
5. "It's All Over Now" (Bobby Womack, Shirley Womack) – 4:49

Side Two

1. "Fool for a Cigarette/Feelin' Good" (Sidney Bailey, J. B. Lenoir, Jim Dickinson) (medley) – 4:25
2. "If Walls Could Talk" (Bobby Miller) – 3:12
3. "Mexican Divorce" (Burt Bacharach, Bob Hilliard) – 3:51
4. "Ditty Wah Ditty" (Arthur Blake) – 5:42

== Personnel ==
- Ry Cooder – guitar, mandolin, vocals
- Milt Holland – drums, percussion
- Jim Keltner – drums
- Russ Titelman, Chris Ethridge – electric bass
- Ronnie Barron – piano, organ
- Red Callender, John Duke – bass guitar
- Plas Johnson – alto saxophone
- Oscar Brashear – cornet
- Bobby King, Gene Mumford, Bill Johnson, George McCurn, Walter Cook, Richard Jones, Russ Titelman, Karl Russell – voices
- Earl Hines – piano on "Ditty Wah Ditty"
- George Bohanon – horn arrangement
- Nick DeCaro – string arrangement

Technical

- Russ Titelman, Lenny Waronker – production
- Judy Maizel, Trudy Portch – production coordination
- Lee Herschberg – engineer, mixing
- Bobby Hata, John Neal – assistant engineer
- Susan Titelman (Ry Cooder's wife and Russ Titelman's sister) – cover paintings and photography

== Chart positions ==
Year	Chart	Peak
1974	Billboard Top LPs & Tape	167
