= You Can't Stop a Tattler =

Song by Washington Phillips
- Released: "You Can't Stop a Tattler Part 1" (1980); "You Can't Stop a Tattler Part 2" (1971)
- Recorded: Dallas, Texas, December 2, 1929
- Genre: Gospel blues
- Length: 2:54 (Part 1); 2:48 (Part 2)
- Songwriter(s): Washington Phillips
- Producer(s): Frank B. Walker

"You Can't Stop a Tattler" is a gospel blues song, written by Washington Phillips (1880–1954) and recorded by him for Columbia Records in 1929 (vocals and zither). The song is in two parts, intended to occupy both sides of a 10-inch 78 rpm record. However, it remained unreleased for many years. Part 2 was included on the 1971 album This Old World's in a Hell of a Fix (Biograph BLP 12027). Both parts were included on a 1980 compilation album of songs by Phillips, Denomination Blues (Agram 2006).

The song is unusual in that the verses are separated by a wordless hummed refrain; a similar device to the wordless vocalise which Phillips had used in "I Had a Good Father and Mother".

The song first came to wider notice when Ry Cooder included a version of Part 2, titled "Tattler", on his 1974 album, Paradise and Lunch (note, however, that Cooder does not label it as "Part 2"; he also includes two verses from Part 1, which seems to have been unreleased at the time); and when Linda Ronstadt covered that version on her 1976 album, Hasten Down the Wind. It has since been recorded several times.

== Recordings ==
- 1929 – Washington Phillips, "You Can't Stop a Tattler, Part 1"
- 1929 – Washington Phillips, "You Can't Stop a Tattler, Part 2"
- 1974 – Ry Cooder, "Tattler" on the album Paradise and Lunch
- 1976 – Linda Ronstadt, "The Tattler" on the album Hasten Down the Wind
- 1977 – David Soul, "Tattler" on the album Playing to an Audience of One
- 1986 – Billy Bragg, "The Tatler" B-side of the single Greetings to the New Brunette
- 1995 – Betty and the Bobs, "Tattler" on the album Betty and the Bobs
- 1999 – Charles Walker, "The Tattler" on the album I'm Available
- 2004 – J. Thibodeau, "Tattler" on the album Everyday Shoes
- 2006 – Freddie Roulette, "Tattler" on the album Man of Steel

== Other songs ==
These songs have related titles to some of those used for the one which is the subject of this article, but are different from it and from each other:

- 1996 – Ralph Towner, "Tattler" on the album Lost and Found
- 2002 – Bittersweet Manics, "Tattler" on the album Bittersweet Manics

The following song may or may not be related to any of those already discussed:

- 2005 – Southern Boys, "Tattler" on the album Deep Down South
