= Love Is a Rose =

Song written by Neil Young

Song by Neil Young

from the album Decade
- Released: October 28, 1977
- Recorded: June 16, 1974
- Studio: Broken Arrow Ranch
- Genre: Folk rock
- Length: 2:16
- Label: Reprise
- Songwriter: Neil Young
- Producers: Neil Young; David Briggs; Tim Mulligan

"Love Is a Rose" is a song written and composed by Neil Young. It first became popular in 1975 when Linda Ronstadt had a country hit with her version. "Love Is a Rose" has also been covered by other artists over the years.

== Neil Young version ==
=== Background ===
Neil Young first recorded "Love Is a Rose" in 1974 for his unreleased album Homegrown. It was later released by Young in 1977 on the compilation Decade. Homegrown finally saw release in 2020, rendering Young's recording of the song no longer unique to Decade.

The melody for "Love Is a Rose" was taken from another as-yet unreleased song "Dance, Dance, Dance," which finally saw release on Live at Massey Hall 1971 in 2007. Young's longtime backing band Crazy Horse recorded the song, with the title "Dance, Dance, Dance", in 1971 on their album Crazy Horse.

=== Personnel ===
- Neil Young – guitar, harmonica, vocals
- Tim Drummond – bass

== Linda Ronstadt version ==
"Love Is a Rose"

Single by Linda Ronstadt

from the album Prisoner in Disguise
- B-side: "Heat Wave"
- Released: August 19, 1975
- Genre: Rock; country rock
- Length: 2:44
- Label: Asylum
- Songwriter: Neil Young
- Producer: Peter Asher

Linda Ronstadt singles chronology
"When Will I Be Loved" (1975)	"Love Is a Rose" (1975)	"Tracks of My Tears" (1975)

=== Background ===
Linda Ronstadt recorded "Love Is a Rose" in a country music arrangement on her platinum-certified 1975 album Prisoner in Disguise. Her rendition peaked at No. 5 the US Billboard Country Singles chart. "Love Is a Rose" also debuted on the pop-oriented "Billboard" Hot 100 but its B-side: "Heat Wave", became the track of choice for pop radio stations, also becoming a No. 5 hit. Ronstadt frequently performed the song at her concerts during the mid-to-late-1970s.

=== Chart performance ===
Chart (1975)	Peak position
US Billboard Hot 100	63
US Hot Country Songs (Billboard)	5
Canada Top Singles (RPM)	100
Canada Country Singles (RPM)	46

== Other versions ==
- Lisa Loeb recorded "Love Is a Rose" on her 2008 album, Camp Lisa.
- Jill Johnson covered the song on her 2009 cover album Music Row II, after having performed the song live in a cappella versions with the band during live concerts.
- Terri Clark recorded a cover of "Love Is a Rose" for her ninth studio album, Classic, which was released November 13, 2012. Clark's version was released as the album's first single in October 2012.
