= Jack Rhodes =

American country and rockabilly songwriter (1907–1968)

Andrew Jackson "Jack" Rhodes (January 12, 1907 – October 9, 1968) was an American country music producer and songwriter, with songwriting credits on over 625 released songs.

Several of his songs became hit records, including "A Satisfied Mind", "Silver Threads and Golden Needles", "Conscience I'm Guilty", "The Waltz of the Angels", "Beautiful Lies", and "Till the Last Leaf Shall Fall". Inducted into the Nashville Songwriters Hall of Fame posthumously in 1972, he was more recently celebrated as one of the founding fathers of rockabilly, having written for Gene Vincent and Capitol Records.

He was inducted into the Rockabilly Hall of Fame in 2009. Jack Rhodes memorabilia is on exhibit at the Mineola Historical Museum in Mineola, Texas and the Nashville Songwriters Hall of Fame in Nashville.

== Early life ==
Jack Rhodes was born on January 12, 1907, in Martin's Mill, Texas, an unincorporated community in Van Zandt County. Little is known about his early childhood except that he never completed school. The 1940 U.S. Census indicates that Rhodes' highest level of education was through the 6th grade in primary school. Like many school-age children during that period, he quit to help support his family. He had five siblings and one stepbrother.

During World War II, he worked in the Houston, Texas shipyards. Rhodes started his career as a songwriter after breaking his back in a work-related accident. While recovering, he began writing songs, trying to avoid the boredom of being bedridden.

Rhodes owned a café in Grand Saline, Texas, and later opened The Trail 80 Motor Courts, a gas station and restaurant in Mineola, Texas.

== Music career ==
Throughout his early years, Jack Rhodes formed several hillbilly/western swing groups with his stepbrother Leon Payne. One of these was The Lone Star Buddies, who released several singles and were regulars at The Louisiana Hayride, as well as performing throughout East Texas and Louisiana. Rhodes often recorded demos at KWKH in Shreveport and other surrounding radio stations, before creating his own studio in Mineola, Texas.

Rhodes is recognized for the rockabilly songs "Rockin' Bones", "Action Packed", and "Woman Love". A mentor for several emerging artists in the mid to late 1950s, Rhodes and his collaborators wrote many songs for Gene Vincent while on the Capitol label.

Rhodes founded his own record label, National Sounds, under his company, All-Roads Music Publishing. Rhodes also owned Red Ball Music Publishing.

BMI awarded him for over a million radio broadcasts of "Silver Threads and Golden Needles", and he received numerous gold records for various releases. One of these was a US country music #1 hit with "A Satisfied Mind" by Porter Wagoner.

== Personal life ==
Rhodes' married Gladyce Lucile Yates in 1929. They had three sons and one daughter.

Rhodes divorced Lucile sometime prior to his marriage to second wife, Loretta Joyce Williams in 1955. Rhodes and Loretta had one son in 1956.

In October 1968, Rhodes died of a heart attack at home, having just returned from Nashville intending to retire.
