= Blue Bayou =

1961 song written by Roy Orbison and Joe Melson

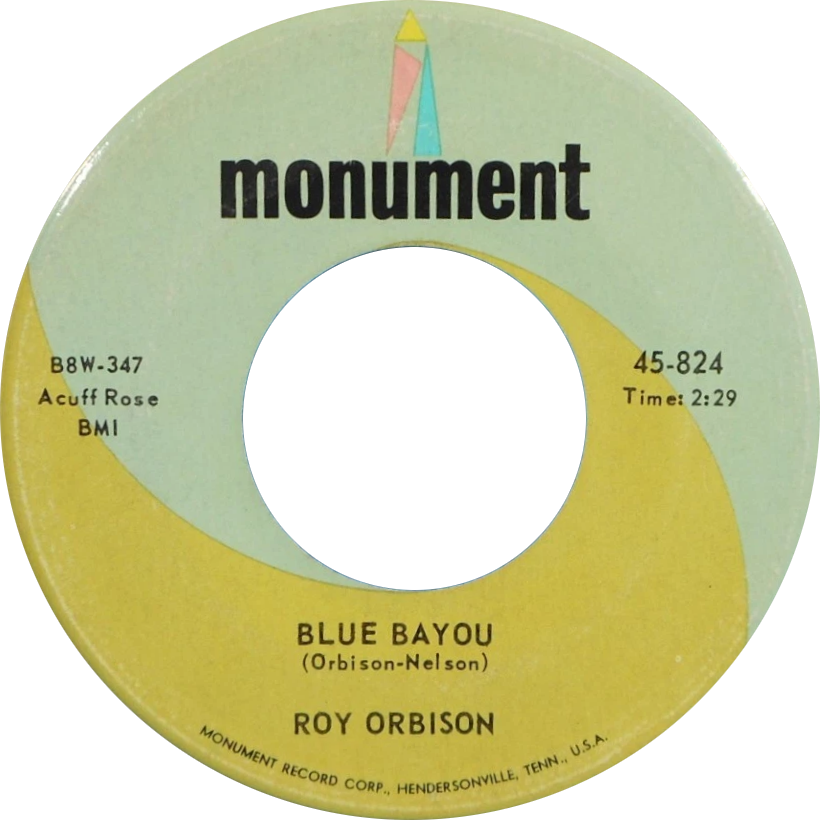
- Side B of the US single

Single by Roy Orbison

from the album In Dreams
- B-side: "Mean Woman Blues"
- Released: August 1, 1963
- Recorded: November 15, 1961
- Studio: RCA Victor Studio B, Nashville
- Genre: Country, folk
- Length: 2:29
- Label: Monument
- Songwriters: Roy Orbison; Joe Melson
- Producer: Fred Foster

Roy Orbison singles chronology
"Falling" (1963)	"Blue Bayou" (1963)	"Pretty Paper" (1963)

"Blue Bayou" is a song written by Roy Orbison and Joe Melson. It was originally sung and recorded by Orbison, who had an international hit with his version in 1963. It later became Linda Ronstadt's signature song, with which she scored a top 5 hit with her cover in 1977. Many others have since recorded the song.

== Roy Orbison version ==
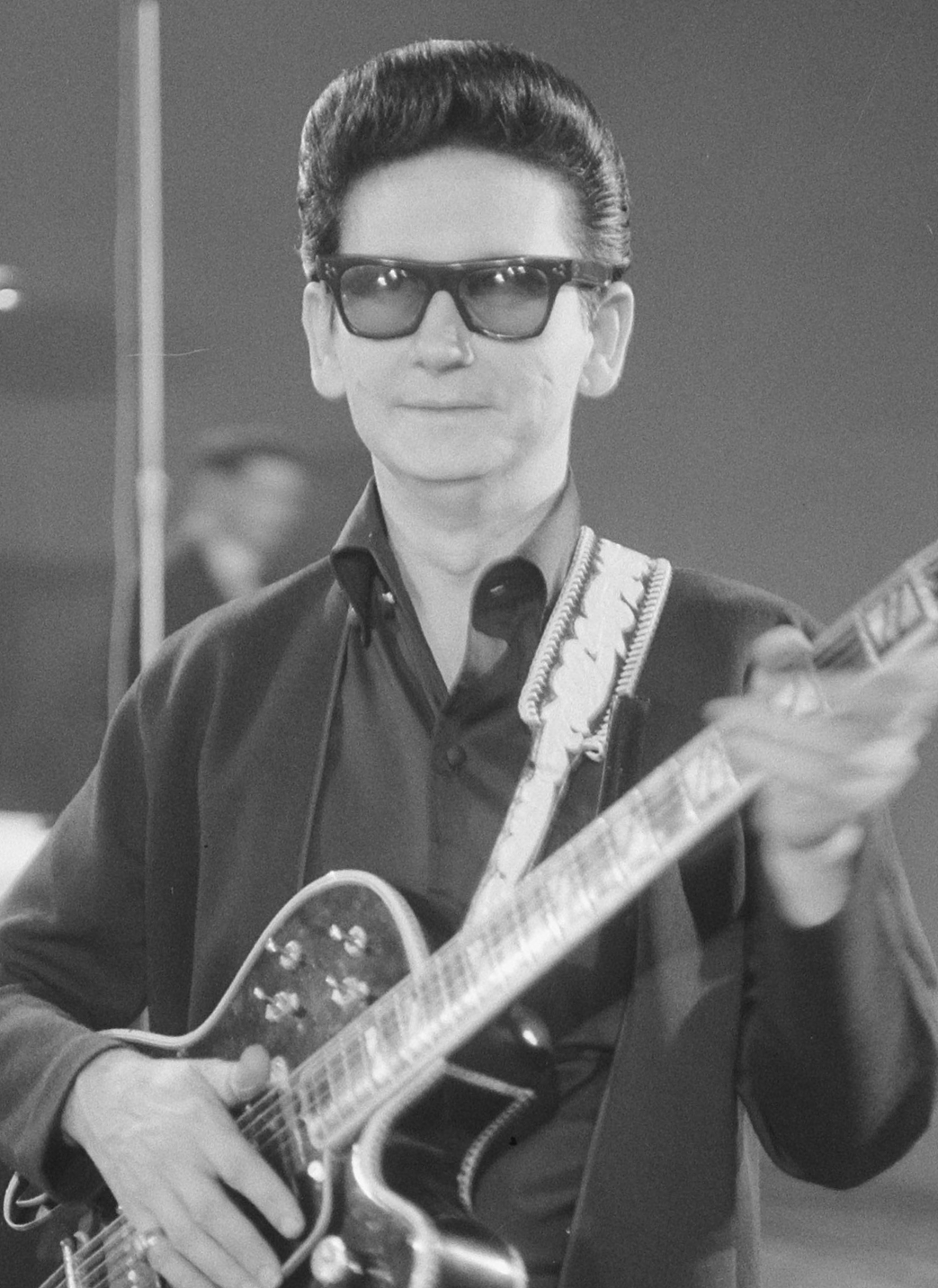
Roy Orbison, 1965

=== Background ===
"Blue Bayou" was originally recorded by Roy Orbison at the end of 1961. In the UK, it was released by London Monument as the double A-side track with "Mean Woman Blues" on a Monument Records single (HLU 9777), where both sides peaked at number 3. It was issued as a B-side single in the US, peaking at number 29; the A-side, "Mean Woman Blues", peaked at number 5. The song also appeared on Orbison's 1963 full-length album In Dreams. According to the authorised biography of Roy Orbison, a rare different version of "Blue Bayou" was released only in Italy (London 45-HL 1499).

"Blue Bayou" reappeared on his 1989 posthumous album A Black & White Night Live, from the 1988 television special on Cinemax.

=== Track listings ===
==== 7" vinyl ====
US: Monument Records 824

Side one

1. "Blue Bayou" (Roy Orbison, Joe Melson) – 2:29 – Recorded in late 1961.

Side two

1. "Mean Woman Blues" (Claude Demetrius) – 2:23

== Chart performance ==
=== Weekly charts ===
Chart (1963)	Peak position
Australian Singles Chart	1
Belgium	3
Canada (CHUM Hit Parade)	14
Irish Singles Chart	1
New Zealand (Lever Hit Parade)	4
Norwegian Singles Chart	10
UK Singles Chart	3
US Billboard Hot 100	29
US Billboard Hot R&B Sides	26
US Cash Box Top 100	21

=== Year-end charts ===
Chart (1963)	Rank
Australia	21
UK	19

== Certifications ==
Certifications for "Blue Bayou"
Region	Certification	Certified units/sales
United Kingdom (BPI)	Silver	200,000^{‡}
^{‡} Sales+streaming figures based on certification alone.

== Use in other media ==
This song has been used in several motion pictures including:

- The Man Who Fell to Earth (1976), directed by Nicolas Roeg and starring David Bowie
- Last Orders (2001), directed by Fred Schepisi
- Dreamcatcher (2003), directed by Lawrence Kasdan
- Man on Fire (2004), directed by Tony Scott
- American Made (2017), directed by Doug Liman and starring Tom Cruise
- The Best of Enemies (2019), directed by Robin Bissell, and starring Taraji P. Henson and Sam Rockwell
- Blue Bayou (film) (2021), directed by Justin Chon. In the film, the song is sung by actress Alicia Vikander

Jacques Cousteau included an abridged version of the song during a "River Explorations" episode, which details environmental changes on the Mississippi River. This song has also been used in the Netflix digital series, Stranger Things (Season 2, Episode 6). A French language version of the song entitled "Tu n'es plus là" was released in 1963 by French rock and roll singer Dick Rivers.

== Linda Ronstadt version ==
"Blue Bayou"
- Side A of the US 7-inch single

Single by Linda Ronstadt

from the album Simple Dreams
- B-side: "Old Paint", "Love Me Tender, "Maybe I'm Right, or "Poor Poor Pitiful Me", depending on the country of release
- Released: August 23, 1977 (US)
- Studio: Sound Factory, Hollywood
- Genre: Country pop, soft rock, yacht rock
- Length: 3:57
- Label: Asylum
- Songwriters: Roy Orbison, Joe Melson
- Producer: Peter Asher

Linda Ronstadt singles chronology
"Lose Again" (1976)	"Blue Bayou" (1977)	"It's So Easy" (1977)

Official video
- "Blue Bayou" on YouTube

=== Background ===
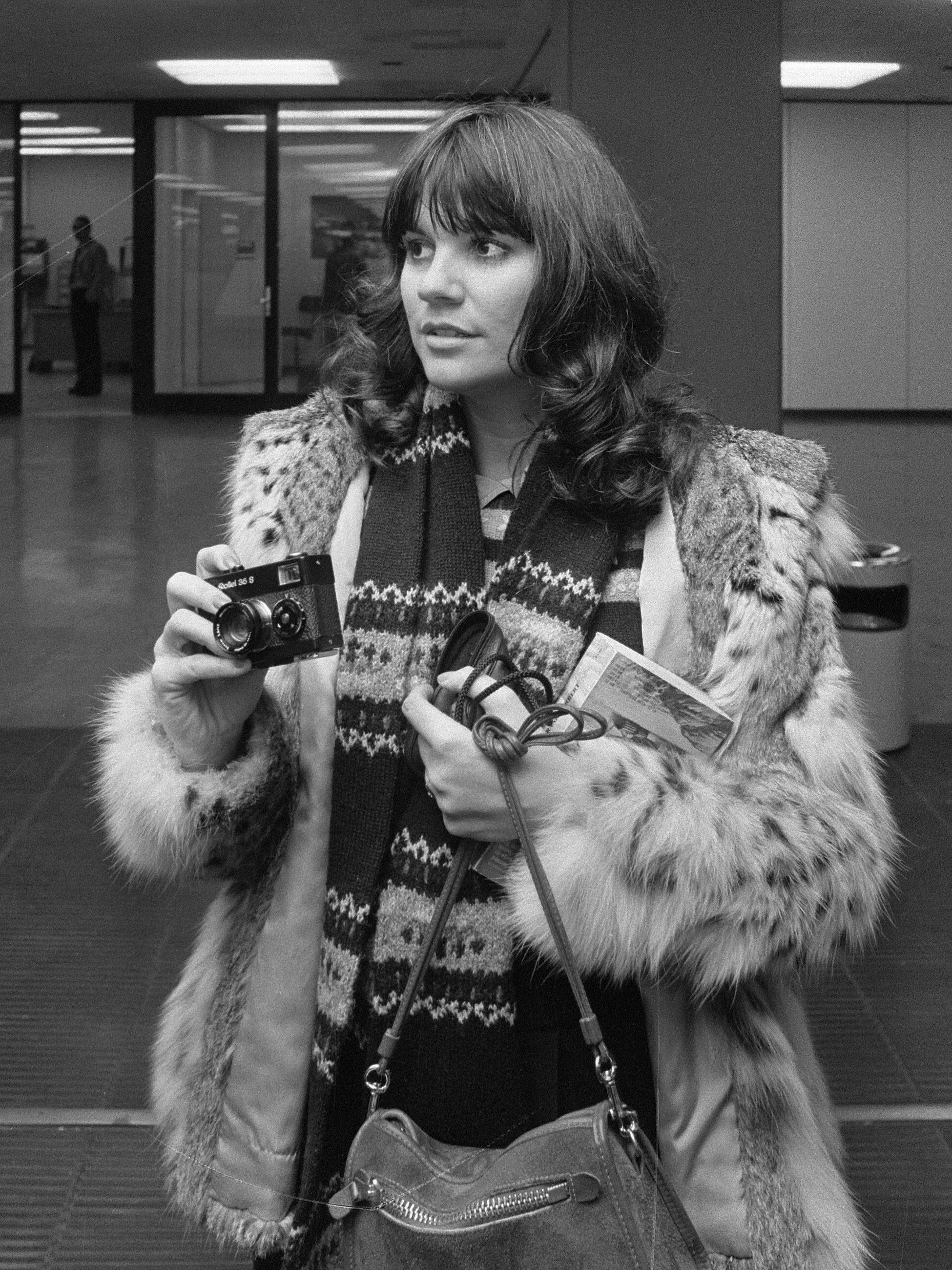
Linda Ronstadt, 1976

Linda Ronstadt took the song to #3 on the Billboard Hot 100 in late 1977, where it held for four weeks, as well as #2 Country and #3 Easy Listening. It also reached #2, holding there for four weeks, on the Cash Box Top 100 chart.

The single was RIAA certified Gold (for sales of over 1 million US copies) in January 1978. It was the first of Ronstadt's three Gold singles. Don Henley of the Eagles sang backup on the recording. "Blue Bayou" was later certified Platinum (for over 2 million copies sold in the United States). It was a worldwide smash, charting in countries such as Australia, Canada, New Zealand, the United Kingdom, and Mexico, where it topped the singles charts.

Ronstadt's version was nominated for the Grammy Award for Record of the Year and for Best Female Pop Vocal Performance.

Ronstadt also recorded a Spanish-language version of the song (translated by her father, Gilbert Ronstadt), titled "Lago Azul (Blue Bayou)", which was released in 1978 on the single Asylum E-45464, backed by "Lo Siento Mi Vida", a previously released Spanish song that Ronstadt herself co-wrote. This version has never been included on any reissues of Simple Dreams.

Ronstadt later performed the song on episode 523 of The Muppet Show, first aired on October 26, 1980, in the UK, and May 16, 1981, in the United States.

Because of this song, Dickson's Baseball Dictionary records that a "Linda Ronstadt" is a synonym for a fastball, a pitch that "blew by you". That phrase was coined by New York Mets broadcaster Tim McCarver during a Mets telecast in the 1980s.

Ronstadt's version appears, in edited form, in Tony Scott's 2004 film Man on Fire and in the 2017 film American Made.

=== Track listings ===
==== 7" vinyl ====
US: Asylum Records E-45431

Side one

1. "Blue Bayou" (Roy Orbison, Joe Melson) – 3:57

Side two

1. "Old Paint (traditional, arranged by Linda Ronstadt) – 3:05

=== Chart performance ===
==== Weekly charts ====
Chart (1977)	Peak position
Canada RPM Top Singles	2
Canada Adult Contemporary (RPM)	2
Canada Country Singles (RPM)	2
Mexico (Billboard Hits of the World)	1
US Billboard Hot 100	3
US Easy Listening (Billboard)	3
US Hot Country Songs (Billboard)	2
US Cash Box Top 100	2
Chart (1978)	Peak position
Australia (Kent Music Report)	3
New Zealand Singles Chart	3
UK Singles Chart	35

==== Year-end charts ====
Chart (1978)	Rank
Australia (Kent Music Report)	33
Canada	90
US Billboard Hot 100	61
US Cash Box	62

=== Certifications ===
Region	Certification	Certified units/sales
New Zealand (RMNZ)	Platinum	30,000^{‡}
United States (RIAA)	Platinum	1,000,000^{^}
^{^} Shipments figures based on certification alone.

== See also ==
- List of number-one hits of 1978 (Mexico)
