= It's So Easy! (The Crickets song) =

1958 single by The Crickets

Single by The Crickets
- B-side: "Lonesome Tears"
- Released: September 12, 1958
- Recorded: June–August 1958
- Studio: Norman Petty Recording Studios (Clovis, New Mexico)
- Genre: Rock and roll
- Length: 2:10
- Label: Brunswick
- Songwriters: Buddy Holly, Norman Petty
- Producer: Norman Petty

The Crickets singles chronology
"Think It Over" (1958)	"It's So Easy!" (1958)	"Love's Made a Fool of You" (1959)

"It's So Easy!" is a rock-and-roll song written by Buddy Holly and Norman Petty. It was originally released as a single in 1958 by the Crickets on Brunswick Records but failed to chart. It was the final release by the Crickets when Holly was still in the band.

A cover version recorded by Linda Ronstadt from her album Simple Dreams was released on September 20, 1977 and was a Top Five hit on the Billboard Hot 100.

== The Crickets version ==
=== Background ===
The song was recorded by Buddy Holly and the Crickets from June to August 1958 at Norman Petty Recording Studios in Clovis, New Mexico.

Holly lip-synched to recordings of "It's So Easy!" and his song "Heartbeat" on the television program American Bandstand on October 28, 1958.

The Crickets recorded "It's So Easy!" for Brunswick Records, which released it as a 45-rpm single in 1958 but it did not chart. The B-side was "Lonesome Tears". Tommy Allsup played the lead guitar parts on both recordings.

== Linda Ronstadt version ==
"It's So Easy"

Single by Linda Ronstadt

from the album Simple Dreams
- B-side: "Lo Siento Mi Vida"
- Released: September 20, 1977
- Genre: Rock
- Length: 2:27
- Label: Asylum
- Songwriters: Buddy Holly; Norman Petty
- Producer: Peter Asher

Linda Ronstadt singles chronology
"Blue Bayou" (1977)	"It's So Easy" (1977)	"Poor Poor Pitiful Me" (1978)

45 RPM side label
- U.S. release by Linda Ronstadt

=== Background ===
Linda Ronstadt recorded "It's So Easy" in 1977 for her album Simple Dreams, produced by Peter Asher. Her recording was released as a single by Asylum Records in the autumn of that year. It hit the Billboard Top Five on the Hot 100 simultaneously with her recording of "Blue Bayou". It also reached No. 9 in Canada and No. 11 on the UK Singles Chart. Ronstadt's version was used in the 2005 film Brokeback Mountain.

=== Personnel ===
- Linda Ronstadt – lead vocals, backing vocals
- Don Grolnick – clavinet
- Dan Dugmore – acoustic guitar
- Waddy Wachtel – electric guitar, backing vocals
- Kenny Edwards – bass guitar, backing vocals
- Rick Marotta – drums
- Peter Asher – backing vocals

== Chart performance ==
=== Weekly charts ===
Chart (1977–1978)	Peak position
Argentina (Cash Box)	10
Belgium (Flanders)	4
Belgium (Wallonia)	12
Canada Top Singles (RPM)	9
Denmark	6
Germany	47
Netherlands	13
New Zealand	11
South Africa (Springbok Radio)	4
Switzerland	6
US Billboard Hot 100	5
US Adult Contemporary (Billboard)	37
US Hot Country Songs (Billboard)	81

=== Year-end charts ===
Chart (1977)	Rank
Canada	107

Chart (1978)	Rank
Canada	178
Switzerland	26
U.S. Billboard Hot 100	90

== Sources ==
- Amburn, Ellis (1996). Buddy Holly: A Biography. St. Martin's Press. ISBN 978-0-312-14557-6.
- Bustard, Anne (2005). Buddy: The Story of Buddy Holly. Simon & Schuster. ISBN 978-1-4223-9302-4.
- Dawson, Jim; Leigh, Spencer (1996). Memories of Buddy Holly. Big Nickel Publications. ISBN 978-0-936433-20-2.
- Gerron, Peggy Sue (2008). Whatever Happened to Peggy Sue? Togi Entertainment. ISBN 978-0-9800085-0-0.
- Goldrosen, John (1975). Buddy Holly: His Life and Music. Popular Press. ISBN 0-85947-018-0.
- Goldrosen, John; Beecher, John (1996). Remembering Buddy: The Definitive Biography. New York: Da Capo Press. ISBN 0-306-80715-7.
- Gribbin, John (2009). Not Fade Away: The Life and Music of Buddy Holly. London: Icon Books. ISBN 978-1-84831-034-6.
