= Back in the U.S.A. =

1959 song by Chuck Berry

Single by Chuck Berry
- B-side: "Memphis, Tennessee"
- Released: June 1959
- Recorded: February 17, 1959
- Studio: Chess (Chicago)
- Genre: Rock and roll
- Label: Chess 1729
- Songwriter: Chuck Berry
- Producers: Leonard Chess, Phil Chess

Chuck Berry singles chronology
"Almost Grown" (1959)	"Back in the U.S.A." (1959)	"Broken Arrow" (1959)

"Back in the U.S.A." is a song written by Chuck Berry that was released in 1959 and was a top 40 hit. A cover version in 1978 by Linda Ronstadt was also a hit.

== Chuck Berry version ==
Chuck Berry first issued the song on Chess Records in 1959 as a single which reached number 37 in the Billboard Hot 100. It also reached number 16 on the R&B chart. The song was later included on Berry's 1962 album More Chuck Berry. The song's lyrics were written upon Berry returning to the United States following a trip to Australia "which was a drag, I mean really a drag. I never found even a hot dog". Berry's biography on the Rock and Roll Hall of Fame website states Berry "saluted such everyday pleasures as the drive-ins and corner cafes 'where hamburgers sizzle on an open grill night and day/Yeah, and a jukebox jumping with records like in the U.S.A.'"

== Recording ==
The song was recorded in Chicago, Illinois, on February 17, 1959.

- Chuck Berry, vocals and guitar
- Johnnie Johnson on piano
- Willie Dixon on bass
- Fred Below on drums
- Etta James and The Marquees, backup vocals

The background vocals on Berry's recording are by Etta James and The Marquees, aka Harvey & the New Moonglows, featuring the young Marvin Gaye.

The session was produced by Leonard and Phil Chess, and the song was released as Chess single 1729.

== Alan Dale and The Casuals version ==
Alan Dale (singer), issued the song in Australia on Colombia in 1959 as a single along with a version of Bo Didley's "Crackin' Up"(45-DO-4086).

== Linda Ronstadt version ==
"Back in the USA"

Single by Linda Ronstadt

from the album Living in the USA
- B-side: "White Rhythm & Blues"
- Released: August 1, 1978
- Genre: Rock
- Length: 3:02
- Label: Asylum
- Songwriter: Chuck Berry
- Producer: Peter Asher

Linda Ronstadt singles chronology
"Tumbling Dice" (1978)	"Back in the USA" (1978)	"Ooh Baby Baby" (1978)

Ronstadt had heard the Berry original while being driven around Los Angeles by Eagles member Glenn Frey who had once been in her band, the track being on a home-made cassette Frey had playing in his tape deck. Ronstadt recalls that she had been reminding Frey "how we used to sit around the Troubadour bar and go: 'Oh it's so horrible and I can't get a record deal.' We were so broke and so miserable and we'd feel so sorry for ourselves and we were so precious about it. Then all of a sudden I looked at him and I went: 'Boy, life's really tough. We're going off to ski [at Aspen] with all this money in our pockets, we're going to have a good time, and we've got great music on the tape player.' Just then "Back in the U.S.A." came on and I went: 'Boy that would be a great song to sing. I think I'll do that one.'"

The single of Ronstadt's version rose as high as number 11 in Cash Box and reached number 16 on the Billboard Hot 100 chart. (It was Top Five in the Detroit marketplace.) On October 16, 1986, Ronstadt joined Chuck Berry onstage at the Fox Theater in St. Louis as part of a concert celebrating Berry's sixtieth birthday. According to production assistant Mark Slocombe, despite Ronstadt having rehearsed with the band playing in the key of C, Berry's guitar playing on the actual concert performance of "Back in the U.S.A." necessitated the band performing in the key of G: Slocombe – "Linda Ronstadt's such a pro, you really don't hear her strain or muff it. But ... she was so pissed off when she walked off that stage she went right through the Green Room, right out the stage door, climbed into her limo and never came back for the second show. [Berry's birthday fête consisted of two concerts planned to feature identical set lists and guest performers.]" The Ronstadt/Berry performance of "Back in the U.S.A." was featured in the film of Berry's sixtieth birthday concert, the 1987 movie release Hail! Hail! Rock 'n' Roll, with the track being included on the soundtrack album; according to Slocombe, "they had a hard time getting [Ronstadt] to sign the release for the [performance] because she was so pissed off."

=== Personnel ===
- Linda Ronstadt – lead vocals
- Dan Dugmore – electric guitar
- Waddy Wachtel – electric guitar, background vocals
- Don Grolnick – piano
- Kenny Edwards – bass, background vocals
- Russell Kunkel – drums
- Peter Asher – background vocals

=== Charts ===
==== Weekly charts ====
Chart (1978)	Peak position
Australia KMR	18
Canada Top Singles (RPM)	8
Canada Country Singles (RPM)	43
New Zealand (Recorded Music NZ)	24
South Africa (Springbok Radio SA Top 20)	11
US Billboard Hot 100	16
US Adult Contemporary (Billboard)	30
US Hot Country Songs (Billboard)	41
US Cash Box Top 100	11

==== Year-end charts ====
Chart (1978)	Rank
Canada RPM Top Singles	83
US (Joel Whitburn's Pop Annual)	113
US Cash Box	88

== Other versions ==
- "Back in the USA" was famously parodied by The Beatles with their song "Back in the U.S.S.R." from their self-titled 1968 album The Beatles (aka the White Album).
- MC5 covered the song in 1970 on their second album, also titled Back in the USA.
- In 1972, a live version of the song appeared on the album Roadwork by Edgar Winter's White Trash.
- The song was covered by Jonathan Richman and the Modern Lovers in 1976 on their self-titled second album.
- Gene Summers included "Back in the USA" on his 1983 album 'Live' In Scandinavia, and he has also used the song as his opening number on numerous occasions.
- Chris Robinson and Rich Robinson of The Black Crowes performed this song during Berry's induction into the Kennedy Center Honors in 2000.
- In Kidsongs Sing Out, America!, the song title is called "Living in the USA" instead of "Back in the USA".
- It was the closing song in Bruce Springsteen and the E Street Band's show at the Main Point in Bryn Mawr, PA on February 5, 1975.
