= That'll Be the Day =

1957 single by the Crickets

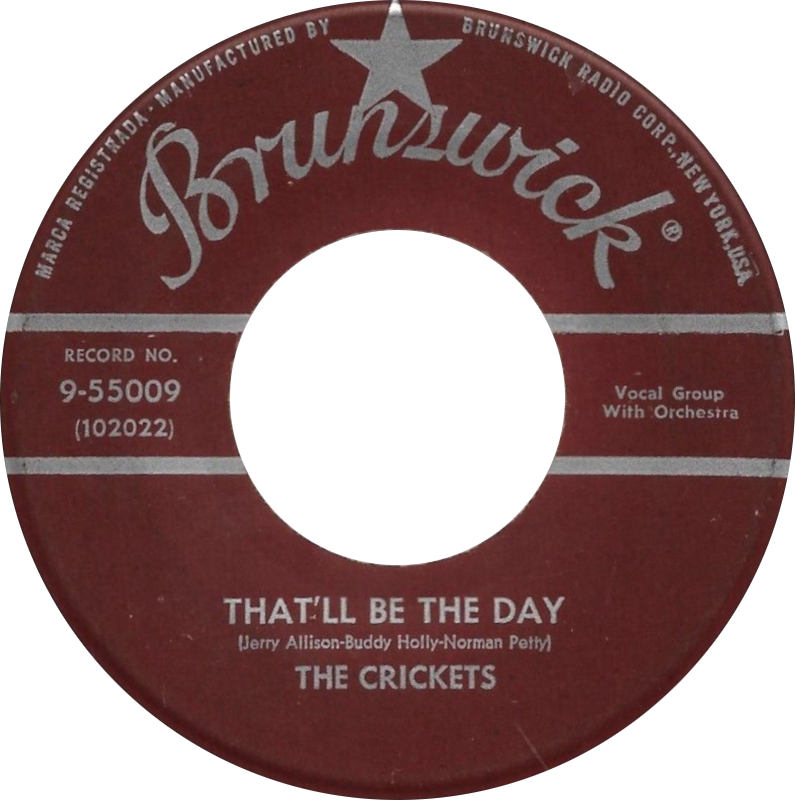
- 1957 Crickets record

Single by the Crickets

from the album The "Chirping" Crickets
- B-side: "I'm Looking for Someone to Love"
- Released: May 27, 1957
- Recorded: 1957
- Studio: Norman Petty Recording Studios (Clovis, New Mexico)
- Genre: Rock and roll; rockabilly
- Length: 2:16
- Label: Brunswick U.S. single 55009; Coral Records, UK single Q.72279; Coral Records BS-1578, Australian 78 single, BSP45-1578, 45 single
- Songwriters: Jerry Allison, Buddy Holly, Norman Petty
- Producer: Norman Petty

The Crickets singles chronology
"That'll Be the Day" (1957)	"Oh, Boy!" (1957)

"That'll Be the Day" is a song written by Buddy Holly and Jerry Allison. It was first recorded by Buddy Holly and the Three Tunes in 1956 and was re-recorded in 1957 by Holly and his new band, the Crickets. Buddy Holly and the Three Tunes' version was released several months after the Crickets' version, which achieved widespread success. Holly's producer, Norman Petty, was credited as a co-writer, although he did not contribute to the composition.

Many other versions have been recorded. It was the first song recorded (as a demonstration disc) by the Quarrymen, a skiffle group from Liverpool that evolved into the Beatles.

The song appeared in the 1973 George Lucas film American Graffiti and was on the MCA Records soundtrack album 41 Original Hits from the Soundtrack of American Graffiti with dialogue by Wolfman Jack, which was certified triple Platinum by the RIAA and which peaked at No. 10 on the Billboard 200 album chart.

The 1957 recording was certified gold (for over a million US sales) by the Recording Industry Association of America (RIAA) in 1969. It was inducted into the Grammy Hall of Fame in 1998. It was placed in the National Recording Registry, a list of sound recordings that "are culturally, historically, or aesthetically important, and/or inform or reflect life in the United States", in 2005.

== Background ==
In June 1956, Holly, along with his older brother Larry as well as Jerry Allison and Sonny Curtis, went to see the film The Searchers, starring John Wayne, in which Wayne repeatedly used the phrase "that'll be the day". This line of dialogue inspired the young musicians.

== Buddy Holly and the Three Tunes' version ==
"That'll Be the Day"

Single by Buddy Holly and the Three Tunes

from the album That'll Be the Day
- B-side: "Rock Around with Ollie Vee"
- Released: September 2, 1957
- Recorded: July 22, 1956
- Studio: Bradley Studios, Nashville, Tennessee
- Genre: Rockabilly, country
- Label: Decca D30434
- Songwriters: Jerry Allison, Buddy Holly, Norman Petty
- Producer: Owen Bradley

Buddy Holly singles chronology
"Words of Love" (1957)	"That'll Be the Day" (1957)	"Peggy Sue" (1957)

The song was first recorded by Buddy Holly and the Three Tunes for Decca Records at Bradley Studios in Nashville, on July 22, 1956. Decca, displeased with Holly's previous two singles, did not issue recordings from this session. After the song was re-recorded by the Crickets in 1957 and became a hit, Decca released the original recording as a single (Decca D30434) on September 2, 1957, with "Rock Around with Ollie Vee" as the B-side. It was also the title track of the 1958 album That'll Be the Day. Despite Holly's newfound stardom, the single did not chart.

== The Crickets' version ==
Holly's contract with Decca prohibited him from re-recording any of the songs recorded in the 1956 Nashville sessions for five years, even if Decca never released them. To evade this restriction, the producer Norman Petty credited the Crickets as the artist on his re-recording of "That'll Be the Day" for Brunswick Records. Brunswick was a subsidiary of Decca. Once the cat was out of the bag, Decca re-signed Holly to another of its subsidiaries, Coral Records, so he ended up with two recording contracts. Recordings with the Crickets were to be issued by Brunswick, and the recordings under Holly's name were to be on Coral, although the Crickets played on several of them.

The second recording of the song was made on February 25, 1957, seven months after the first, at the Norman Petty Recording Studios in Clovis, New Mexico, and issued by Brunswick on May 27, 1957. This version is on the debut album by the Crickets, The "Chirping" Crickets, issued on November 27, 1957. The recording was made with everyone performing and without additional overdubs. The B-side of the record, "I'm Looking for Someone to Love" was recorded at the same session with the same backup singers.

The Brunswick recording of "That'll Be the Day" is considered a classic of rock and roll. It was ranked number 39 on Rolling Stone's list of the "500 Greatest Songs of All Time".

=== Chart performance ===
The Brunswick single was a number-one hit on Billboard magazine's Best Sellers in Stores chart in 1957. It went to number two on Billboard's R&B singles chart. The song peaked at number 1 in the UK Singles Chart in November 1957 and stayed in that position for three weeks.

On December 20, 1969, a reissue of the single by Coral Records was awarded a "gold single" by the RIAA.

On September 20, 1986, the song appeared on the UK Singles Chart at number 85 and left the chart a week later.

=== Charts ===
Chart performance for "That'll Be the Day"
Chart (1957)	Peak position
Canada CHUM Chart	2
UK Singles (Official Charts)	1
US Billboard Top 100	1

=== Certifications ===
Certifications for "That'll Be the Day"
Region	Certification	Certified units/sales
United States (RIAA)	Gold	1,000,000^{^}
^{^} Shipments figures based on certification alone.

=== Personnel ===
July 22, 1956, Bradley Studios, Nashville

- Buddy Holly – vocals, lead guitar
- Sonny Curtis – rhythm guitar
- Don Guess – bass
- Jerry Allison – drums

February 25, 1957, Norman Petty Recording Studios

- Buddy Holly – lead guitar and vocals
- Larry Welborn – bass
- Jerry Allison – drums
- Niki Sullivan – acoustic guitar and background vocals
- Gary Tollett – background vocals
- Ramona Tollett – background vocals

== Linda Ronstadt version ==
"That'll Be the Day"
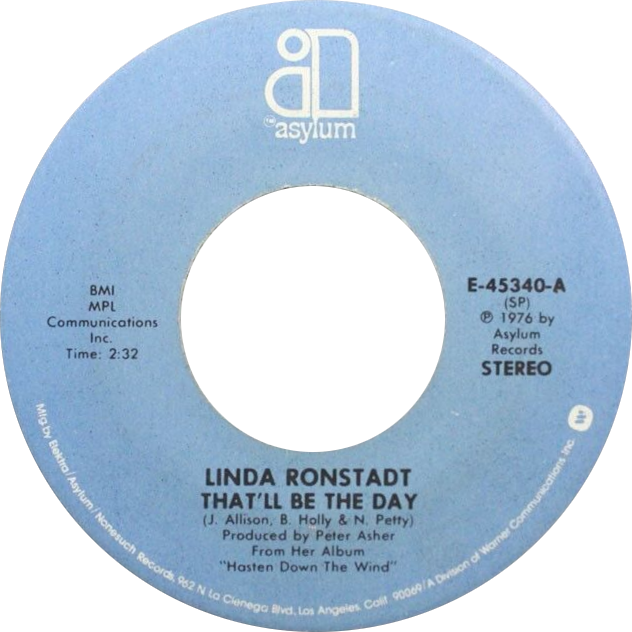
- One of side-A labels of the US single

Single by Linda Ronstadt

from the album Hasten Down the Wind
- B-side: "Crazy"
- Released: August 1976
- Recorded: 1976
- Genre: Country, country rock
- Length: 2:32
- Label: Asylum
- Songwriters: Jerry Allison, Buddy Holly, Norman Petty
- Producer: Peter Asher

Linda Ronstadt singles chronology
"Tracks of My Tears" (1975)	"That'll Be the Day" (1976)	"Someone to Lay Down Beside Me" (1977)

=== Background ===
Linda Ronstadt recorded "That'll Be the Day" for her 1976 Grammy Award-winning platinum album Hasten Down the Wind, produced by Peter Asher and issued by Asylum Records. Her version reached number 11 on both the U.S. Billboard Hot 100 and the Cash Box Top 100 and number 27 on the Billboard Country Singles chart. In Canada, her version peaked at number 2 on the singles chart and was the 35th biggest hit of 1976. It also made the Adult Contemporary charts in the United States and Canada. This recording is included on the album Linda Ronstadt's Greatest Hits (1976) and on the 2011 tribute album Listen to Me: Buddy Holly.

=== Chart performance ===
Chart (1976–77)	Peak position
Canada Top Singles (RPM)	2
Canada Adult Contemporary (RPM)	14
Canada Country Singles (RPM)	17
US Billboard Hot 100	11
US Adult Contemporary (Billboard)	16
US Hot Country Songs (Billboard)	27
U.S. Cash Box Top 100	11

Year-end chart (1976)	Rank
Canada RPM Top Singles	35
U.S. (Joel Whitburn's Pop Annual)	93

Year-end chart (1977)	Rank
Canada RPM Top Singles	187

== Bibliography ==
- Amburn, Ellis (1995). Buddy Holly: A Biography. St. Martin's Press.
- Bustard, Anne (2005). Buddy: The Story of Buddy Holly. Simon & Schuster. ISBN 978-1-4223-9302-4.
- Dawson, Jim; Leigh, Spencer (1996). Memories of Buddy Holly. Big Nickel Publications. ISBN 978-0-936433-20-2.
- Goldrosen, John; Beecher, John (1996). Remembering Buddy: The Definitive Biography. New York: Da Capo Press. ISBN 0-306-80715-7.
- Goldrosen, John (1975). Buddy Holly: His Life and Music. Popular Press. ISBN 0-85947-018-0
- Laing, Dave (1971–2010). Buddy Holly. Icons of Pop Music. Bloomington, IN: Indiana University Press. ISBN 0-253-22168-4. OCLC 611172616.
- Mann, Alan (1996). The A-Z of Buddy Holly. Aurum Press (2nd edition). ISBN 1-85410-433-0 or 978–1854104335.
- Norman, Phillip (1996) Rave On: The Biography of Buddy Holly. Simon & Schuster Publishing. ISBN 0684800829.
- Peer, Elizabeth and Ralph II (1972). Buddy Holly: A Biography in Words, Photographs and Music Australia: Peer International. ASIN B000W24DZO.
- Peters, Richard (1990). The Legend That Is Buddy Holly. Barnes & Noble Books. ISBN 0-285-63005-9 or 978–0285630055.
- Rabin, Stanton (2009). OH BOY! The Life and Music of Rock 'n' Roll Pioneer Buddy Holly. Van Winkle Publishing (Kindle). ASIN B0010QBLLG.
- Tobler, John (1979). The Buddy Holly Story. Beaufort Books.
