= Prisoner in Disguise =

Prisoner In Disguise

Studio album by Linda Ronstadt
- Released: September 15, 1975
- Recorded: February–June 1975
- Studio: Sound Factory (Los Angeles)
- Genres: Rock, country rock
- Length: 35:57
- Labels: Asylum, Rhino
- Producer: Peter Asher

Linda Ronstadt chronology
Heart Like a Wheel (1974)	Prisoner In Disguise (1975)	Hasten Down the Wind (1976)

Singles from Prisoner in Disguise
- 1. "Love Is a Rose" Released: August 19, 1975 (Charted on September 6); 2. "Heat Wave" Released: September 2, 1975 (Charted on September 20); 3. "Tracks of My Tears" Released: December 2, 1975 (Charted on December 20)

Prisoner In Disguise (1975) is Linda Ronstadt's sixth solo LP release and her second for the label Asylum Records. It followed Ronstadt's multi-platinum breakthrough album, Heart Like a Wheel, which became her first number one album on the US Billboard 200 album chart in early 1975.

== History ==
Ronstadt chose songs from friends and songwriters such as James Taylor, Lowell George of Little Feat, JD Souther and Anna McGarrigle as well as one written and originally recorded by Jimmy Cliff and an interpretation of Dolly Parton's "I Will Always Love You". The album features string arrangements by David Campbell. Among the guest musicians, Emmylou Harris joined Ronstadt on the standard "The Sweetest Gift".

The original vinyl album release was a gatefold design, and the center section featured a photo of various sheets with written lyrics to the songs, most of which were in the original songwriters' own handwriting.

Trisha Yearwood cited Prisoner in Disguise as an inspiration, bringing the album to her producer at the start of her career saying, “This is the kind of music that I want to make."

== Critical reception ==
Professional ratings
Review scores
Source	Rating
AllMusic	4.5/5 stars
Christgau's Record Guide	B
Rolling Stone	(mixed)
The Rolling Stone Album Guide	3/5 stars

Steve Simels in Stereo Review's December 1975 issue described Ronstadt's singing on Parton's "I Will Always Love You" as "absolutely gorgeous, full-bodied and intense". The album peaked on the Billboard album chart at #4. It also reached #2 on the country album chart, and has been certified Platinum by the Recording Industry Association of America.

"Heat Wave", a rockified re-make of the 1963 hit covered by Martha and the Vandellas, peaked at #5 on the Billboard Hot 100 singles chart. Its B-side, a countrified version of Neil Young's "Love Is A Rose", generated its own airplay and peaked at #5 on the Hot Country Songs chart.

The double-sided hits "Tracks Of My Tears", a re-make of a 1965 hit by the Miracles, and "The Sweetest Gift", an older country standard then most recently recorded by the Seldom Scene, also made it to the Country singles chart, peaking at #11 and #12 respectively in early 1976. "Tracks" also peaked at #25 on the Billboard Hot 100 and #4 on the adult contemporary songs chart. An album track composed by Lowell George, "Roll Um Easy", was very popular on the burgeoning AOR (album-oriented rock) format.

== Track listing ==
Side one
No.	Title	Writer(s)	Length
1.	"Love Is a Rose"	Neil Young	2:46
2.	"Hey Mister, That's Me Up on the Jukebox"	James Taylor	3:56
3.	"Roll Um Easy"	Lowell George	2:58
4.	"Tracks of My Tears"	Warren "Pete" Moore, William "Smokey" Robinson Jr., Marvin Tarplin	3:12
5.	"Prisoner in Disguise"	JD Souther	3:54

Side two
No.	Title	Writer(s)	Length
1.	"Heat Wave"	Lamont Dozier, Brian Holland, Eddie Holland	2:46
2.	"Many Rivers to Cross"	Jimmy Cliff	4:05
3.	"The Sweetest Gift"	James B. Coats	3:00
4.	"You Tell Me That I'm Falling Down"	Carol S. Holland, Anna McGarrigle	3:17
5.	"I Will Always Love You"	Dolly Parton	3:00
6.	"Silver Blue"	JD Souther	3:03
Total length:			35:57

== Personnel ==
- Linda Ronstadt – lead vocals
- Andrew Gold – acoustic guitar (1, 3-4, 6, 9), handclaps (1, 6), backing vocals (1–4, 6-7), acoustic piano (2, 5–7, 10), synthesizers (2, 6), tambourine (2–4, 7, 10), electric piano (4, 11), electric guitar (6-7, 10-11), drums (6), congas (6), Hammond organ (7), bagpipes (9)
- Herb Pedersen – banjo (1), backing vocals (1-2, 4)
- Dan Dugmore – steel guitar (2, 4-7, 10-11)
- Lowell George – slide guitar (3)
- Danny Kortchmar – electric guitar (4)
- JD Souther – acoustic guitar (5, 11), harmony vocals (5, 11)
- Emmylou Harris – acoustic guitar (8), harmony vocals (8)
- David Grisman – mandolin (8)
- James Taylor – acoustic guitar (9)
- Ed Black – electric guitar (10)
- Glen Hardin – acoustic piano (8)
- Kenny Edwards – bass guitar (1–4, 6–11), backing vocals (1–4, 6-7)
- Russ Kunkel – drums (1-2, 7, 9–11)
- Nigel Olsson – drums (3)
- David Kemper – drums (4)
- Peter Asher – shaker (1), tambourine (1), handclaps (1, 6), guitars (3), cowbell (3), cabasa (4), backing vocals (4), bagpipes (9)
- Jim Conner – harmonica (1)
- David Lindley – fiddle (1, 8-9)
- David Campbell – string arrangements and conductor (2–5, 10)
- Don Francisco – backing vocals (4)
- Maria Muldaur – harmony vocals (9)
- Pat Henderson – backing vocals (10)
- Julia Tillman Waters – backing vocals (10)
- Maxine Willard Waters – backing vocals (10)

=== Production ===
- Peter Asher – producer
- Val Garay – engineer
- Doug Sax – mastering at The Mastering Lab (Hollywood, California)
- John Kosh – cover design
- Ethan Russell – photography

== Charts ==
Chart (1975–1976)	Peak position
Australia (Kent Music Report)	76
Canada Top Albums/CDs (RPM)	13
US Billboard 200	4

== Certifications ==
Region	Certification	Certified units/sales
United States (RIAA)	Platinum	1,000,000^{^}
^{^} Shipments figures based on certification alone.

== Release history ==
Release history and formats for Prisoner in Disguise
Region	Date	Format	Label	Ref.
North America	September 15, 1975	LP; cassette	Asylum Records	
