= You're No Good =

1963 single by Dee Dee Warwick

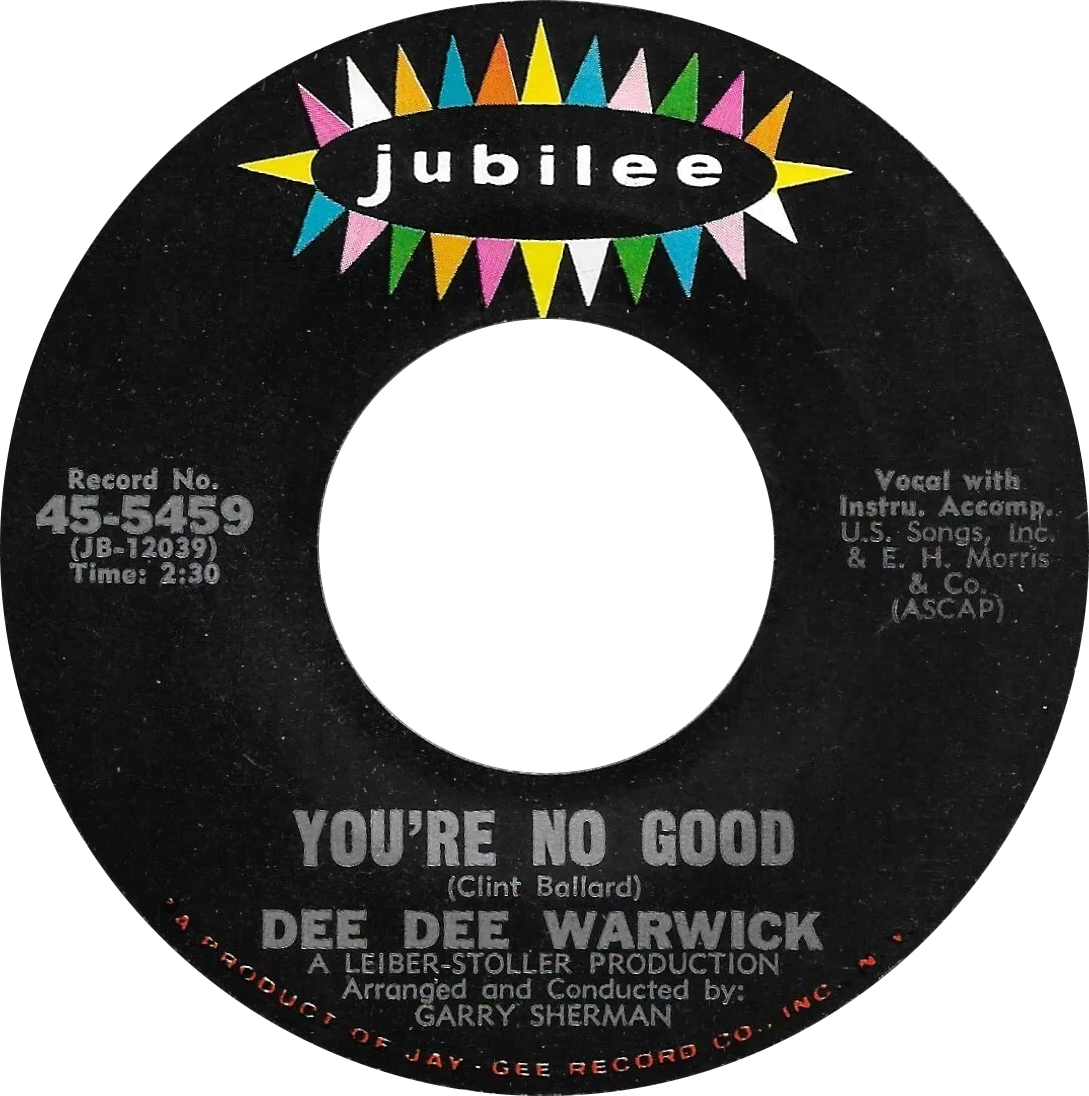
- US single of Dee Dee Warwick recording

Single by Dee Dee Warwick
- B-side: "Don't Call Me"
- Released: 1963
- Genre: R&B
- Length: 2:30
- Label: Jubilee
- Songwriter: Clint Ballard Jr.
- Producer: Jerry Leiber and Mike Stoller

"You're No Good" is a song written by Clint Ballard Jr., first performed by Dee Dee Warwick for Jubilee Records in 1963 with production by Jerry Leiber and Mike Stoller. It has since been covered by many artists, including charting versions by Betty Everett in 1963, the Swinging Blue Jeans in 1964, and Linda Ronstadt in 1974, whose version was a number 1 hit in the United States. Van Halen covered on the 1979 album Van Halen II.

In the lyrics, the singer tells her ex that she's glad they broke up because he's "no good."

== Betty Everett version ==
"You're No Good"

Single by Betty Everett

from the album You're No Good
- B-side: "Chained to Your Love"
- Released: 1963
- Recorded: September 12, 1963
- Genre: Soul
- Length: 2:18
- Label: Vee-Jay 566
- Songwriter: Clint Ballard Jr.

Betty Everett singles chronology
"Prince of Players" (1963)	"You're No Good" (1963)	"The Shoop Shoop Song (It's in His Kiss)" (1964)

Betty Everett's version for Vee-Jay Records of Chicago became the first hit version in November 1963. The single peaked at number 51 on the Billboard Hot 100 and at number 5 on Cashbox's R&B Locations chart.

Vee-Jay's head A&R man Calvin Carter found the song while visiting New York City in search of material for his label's roster. He originally intended to cut "You're No Good" with Dee Clark but, he recalled: "when I went to rehearsal with the tune, it was so negative, I said, 'Hey, guys don't talk negative about girls, because girls are the record buyers. No, I better pass on that.' So I gave the song to Betty Everett." During the playback of Everett's track her label-mates the Dells "were sitting on the wooden platform where the string players would sit... just stomping their feet on this wooden platform to the beat of the song as it was playing back... I told the engineer 'Let's do it again, and let's mic those foot sounds, 'cause it really gave it a hell of a beat.' So we did that, and boom, a hit."

== The Swinging Blue Jeans version ==
"You're No Good"

Single by the Swinging Blue Jeans
- B-side: "Don't You Worry About Me"
- Released: May 1964
- Genre: Beat
- Label: His Master's Voice
- Songwriter: Clint Ballard Jr.
- Producer: Walter J. Ridley

The Swinging Blue Jeans singles chronology
"Good Golly Miss Molly" (1964)	"You're No Good" (1964)	"Promise You'll Tell Her" (1964)

In the UK, the Swinging Blue Jeans had the hit version of "You're No Good", reaching number 3 in the summer of 1964. Sue Johnston, then personal assistant to Peter Brown, was dating Swinging Blue Jeans drummer Norman Kuhlke and claims that she brought "You're No Good" to the attention of the Swinging Blue Jeans. Their version also charted in France at number 26 and was successful enough regionally in the US to reach number 97 on the Hot 100. It also peaked at No. 7 on the New Zealand Lever Hit Parade.

== Linda Ronstadt version ==
"You're No Good"
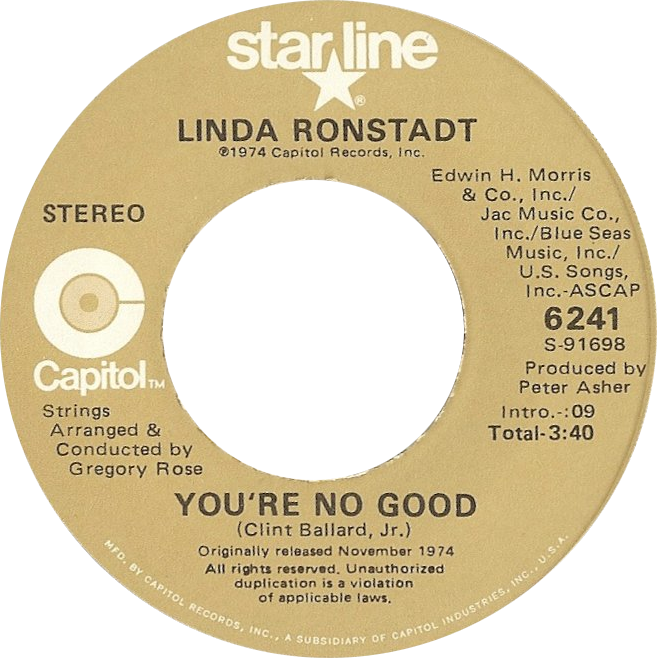
- One of US reissues

Single by Linda Ronstadt

from the album Heart Like a Wheel
- B-side: "I Can't Help It (If I'm Still in Love with You)"
- Released: November 19, 1974
- Recorded: July 5, 1974
- Studio: The Sound Factory, Los Angeles, California
- Genre: Rock; southern rock
- Length: 3:44
- Label: Capitol
- Songwriter: Clint Ballard Jr.
- Producer: Peter Asher

Linda Ronstadt singles chronology
"Love Has No Pride" (1974)	"You're No Good" (1974)	"When Will I Be Loved" (1975)

Audio
- "You're No Good" by Linda Ronstadt on YouTube

=== Background ===
Linda Ronstadt began performing "You're No Good" to close her live shows in early 1973, after her band member Kenny Edwards suggested it. She first included it in her setlist while opening for Neil Young. Ronstadt gave an early televised performance of "You're No Good" on an episode of The Midnight Special, broadcast December 21, 1973.

Ronstadt recorded her album Heart Like a Wheel with producer Peter Asher in mid-1974 at the Sound Factory; "You're No Good" was a last-minute choice for recording, and while the song was Ronstadt's suggestion, Asher recalls: "It was an odd coincidence. She’d been doing the song already, and it was always a favorite song of mine... the version I fell in love with [being by] the Swinging Blue Jeans". The original backing track intended for Ronstadt's version of "You're No Good" was recorded July 1, 1974. According to Bob Warford, a guitarist in Ronstadt's touring band who played on the July 1 track, "They were trying to do an R&B version of the song, which was actually closer to the way we did it live than to the released version. We played it at a faster tempo live, which we did on that recording [ie. of July 1]." Ronstadt vetoed the July 1 arrangement; she recalls: "It was just the wrong groove for me. I don’t think I knew how to phrase around [the players], certainly no fault of theirs. They were fantastic."

The final recording of the Ronstadt version of "You're No Good" was made on July 5, 1974. Ronstadt would recall: "Ed Black, who played six-string guitar and pedal steel, started to play a rhythm riff on his Les Paul. Kenny Edwards... the bass player... echoed the riff in octaves. Andrew Gold added a sparse drum track, giving me a basic track to sing over. We did a few takes, picked one we liked, and then Andrew, who always played guitars and keyboards went to work with Peter (Asher) and began to work up layers of guitar, piano and percussion tracks." Ronstadt recalls that during a playback after several hours of work, Val Garay, the engineer, accidentally erased Andrew Gold's guitar solo from the track, necessitating Asher and Gold's reconstructing that solo from scratch, though Asher and Garay dispute that recollection.

In late August 1974, a string arrangement by Gregory Rose was added to the track at AIR Studios. According to a Classic Tracks article by Matt Hurwitz at MixOnline.com: "It ends with a strong, long held note, which Asher conceived, executed by Garay with a slow riding of the level on the string faders during the final mix."

Capitol Records was unsure whether to release "You're No Good" or "When Will I Be Loved" as the lead single off Heart Like a Wheel, only deciding to release "You're No Good" a week after the album's release.

Linda Ronstadt's version of "You're No Good" became the song's most successful cover. The track ascended to number 1 on the Billboard Hot 100 chart dated February 15, 1975, her only song to reach that position. "You're No Good" was also an international hit for Ronstadt, reaching number 15 in Australia, number 17 in the Netherlands, and number 24 in New Zealand. The B-side of "You're No Good", "I Can't Help It (If I'm Still in Love with You)," originally sung by Hank Williams, also charted and was simultaneously a number 2 C&W hit for Ronstadt. "When Will I Be Loved" was then issued as the follow-up single.

Buoyed in part by the success of "You're No Good", the album Heart Like a Wheel, which was released in late 1974, was a major success, eventually going double Platinum and topping the Billboard album chart. It was also nominated for the Grammy Award for Album of the Year.

The success of "You're No Good" set a precedent for Ronstadt's single releases which over the next five years would virtually all be remakes of classic rock and roll songs.

In a 1983 interview with the Los Angeles Times, Ronstadt expressed reservations about the recordings she had made during her 1970s heyday, specifically citing "You're No Good": "I thought the production on 'You're No Good' was very good but [that] I didn't sing it very well. As a song it was just an afterthought. It's not the kind of song I got a lot of satisfaction out of singing."

=== Personnel ===
- Linda Ronstadt – lead vocals
- Andrew Gold – electric piano, electric guitar solo, drums, percussion
- Eddie Black – electric guitar
- Kenny Edwards – bass guitar
- Clydie King, Sherlie Matthews – backing vocals
- Gregory Rose – string arrangement and conductor

=== Charts ===
==== Weekly charts ====
Chart (1974–1975)	Peak position
Australia (Kent Music Report)	15
Canada Top Singles (RPM)	11
Canada Adult Contemporary	2
Netherlands (Single Top 100)	17
New Zealand (Recorded Music NZ)	24
US Billboard Hot 100	1
US Adult Contemporary (Billboard)	10
US Cash Box Top 100	1

==== Year-end charts ====
Chart (1975)	Rank
Australia (Kent Music Report)	93
Canada	97
US Billboard Hot 100	51
US Cash Box Top 100	69
