= Don't Cry Now =

Studio album by Linda Ronstadt
- Released: October 1, 1973
- Recorded: 1972–1973
- Genres: Country folk; country rock; pop rock
- Length: 35:34
- Label: Asylum
- Producers: John David Souther; John Boylan; Peter Asher

Linda Ronstadt chronology
Linda Ronstadt (1972)	Don't Cry Now (1973)	Heart Like a Wheel (1974)

Singles from Don't Cry Now
- 1. "Love Has No Pride" Released: October 1973; 2. "Silver Threads and Golden Needles" Released: February 1974; 3. "Colorado" Released: May 1974

Don't Cry Now is the fourth solo studio album by American singer Linda Ronstadt. It was released by Asylum Records on October 1, 1973, and contained ten tracks. While some tracks were new material, many of the songs were cover tunes. The album explored the genres of Country folk, country rock and pop rock. It was Ronstadt's first album recorded on the Asylum label and first to feature producer Peter Asher. Don't Cry Now was given favorable reviews from several music publications and was a commercial success. Along with reaching chart positions in multiple countries, it also certified gold in the United States for selling over 500,000 copies.

== Background and recording ==
Linda Ronstadt had been recording for Capitol Records in the early part of her career. Since the break up of her group the Stone Poneys, Ronstadt had been recording as a solo artist. She had some chart success with the single "Long, Long Time" in 1970. In the early seventies, Ronstadt obtained an early release from her Capitol contract to sign with David Geffen's Asylum Records. Although Don't Cry Now marked the start of Ronstadt's long association with Asylum, due to contractual obligations her next recorded album, Heart Like a Wheel, would be released on her previous label, Capitol.

Ronstadt began the recording process for Don't Cry Now in 1972. It would take a year to finish. The album reportedly cost over $150,000 to make. It was first produced by John Boylan and JD Souther, each of whom had separate romantic relationships with Ronstadt at the time. The album's recording kept getting delayed primarily due to Ronstadt going on tour with Neil Young. James Taylor knew of Ronstadt's music and his family introduced her to producer Peter Asher. Asher and Ronstadt would eventually record 13 albums together. Asher helped Ronstadt finish recording Don't Cry Now in 1973.

== Content ==
Don't Cry Now consisted of ten tracks. Three tracks were penned by co-producer JD Souther: "I Can Almost See It", "The Fast One" and the title track. A selection of songs on the album were covers. Among them was "Love Has No Pride", which was first recorded by Bonnie Raitt. A second was "Silver Threads and Golden Needles". Although first recorded by Wanda Jackson, it was notably a US top 20 song for The Springfields in 1962. The track "Everybody Loves a Winner" was first a top 30 US R&B song for Glenn Jones. Also included was Randy Newman's "Sail Away", the Eagles' "Desperado" and Neil Young's "I Believe in You".

== Critical reception ==
Professional ratings
Review scores
Source	Rating
Allmusic	3/5 stars
Christgau's Record Guide	C+
Rolling Stone	(favorable)
The Rolling Stone Album Guide	2.5/5 stars

Don't Cry Now was met with generally favorable reviews. Billboard described it as both "fresh and reflective". They found Ronstadt's vocals "confident" and to evoke similar qualities to that of Joan Baez. Rolling Stone also drew comparisons to Baez, notably to her album Blessed Are.... Writer Stephen Holden also praised Ronstadt's vocal performance: "Her natural vocal equipment is second to none. Combined with perfect pitch, impeccable phrasing and control, her singing carries a throb that hurts and soothes at the same time, and her feeling for the melodic construction of any given song is always proportionate to its structure." AllMusic's Stephen Thomas Erlewine rated Don't Cry Now three out of five stars and commented that it "expanded the pop/rock concessions of Linda Ronstadt, and the result was the singer's first genuine hit record."

== Release, chart performance and singles ==
Don't Cry Now was originally released by Asylum Records on October 1, 1973. It was made available as a vinyl LP, 8-track and cassette, with five selections on either side of both formats. It was Ronstadt's first Asylum album and fifth overall. Don't Cry Now entered the US Billboard 200 albums chart in October 1973 and spent 56 weeks there. In March 1974, it peaked at the number 45 position. It also went to the number 57 position on Canada's RPM all-genre chart and number 46 on Australia's Kent Music Report chart. It was Ronstadt's second album to make positions in Australia and Canada.

A total of three singles were spawned from Don't Cry Now. The first was "Love Has No Pride", which was issued by Asylum in October 1973. It reached number 51 on the US Hot 100 and number 59 on Canada's Top Singles chart. It was followed in February 1974 by "Silver Threads and Golden Needles". Along with reaching number 67 on the US Hot 100 and number 90 on the Canadian Top Singles charts, it also reached number 20 on the US and Canadian country charts. "Colorado" was issued as the album's third single in May 1974.

== Track listing ==
Side one
No.	Title	Writer(s)	Length
1.	"I Can Almost See It"	JD Souther	3:50
2.	"Love Has No Pride"	Eric Kaz; Libby Titus	4:10
3.	"Silver Threads and Golden Needles"	Dick Reynolds; Jack Rhodes	2:28
4.	"Desperado"	Don Henley; Glenn Frey	3:30
5.	"Don't Cry Now"	Souther	4:28

Side two
No.	Title	Writer(s)	Length
1.	"Sail Away"	Randy Newman	3:05
2.	"Colorado"	Rick Roberts	4:18
3.	"The Fast One"	Souther	3:40
4.	"Everybody Loves a Winner"	Bill Williams; Booker T. Jones; William Bell	3:15
5.	"I Believe in You"	Neil Young	2:50
Total length:			35:34

== Personnel ==
All credits are adapted from the liner notes of Don't Cry Now.

Musical personnel

- Linda Ronstadt – lead vocals, tambourine (3), backing vocals (5, 8-9)
- Spooner Oldham – acoustic piano (1, 4-5)
- John Boylan – electric piano (2)
- Craig Doerge – acoustic piano (6, 10)
- JD Souther – acoustic guitar (1, 8), bass guitar (1), electric guitar (4), backing vocals (8)
- Jerry McGee – electric guitar (1)
- Sneaky Pete Kleinow – steel guitar (1-2, 6-7)
- Richard Bowden – electric guitar (2-3, 7, 9-10)
- Andy Johnson – electric guitar (2)
- Herb Pedersen – acoustic guitar (3), backing vocals (3, 9)
- Ed Black – steel guitar (3, 8, 10), electric guitar (7)
- Larry Carlton – electric guitar (5, 6)
- Buddy Emmons – pedal steel guitar (5)
- Rick Roberts – acoustic guitar (7)
- Glenn Frey – electric guitar (8), steel guitar (9)
- Mike Bowden – bass guitar (2-3, 7, 9)
- Chris Ethridge – bass guitar (4-5, 8)
- Leland Sklar – bass guitar (6, 10)
- Dennis St. John – drums (1, 4-5, 8)
- Mickey McGee – drums (2-3, 7, 9)
- Russ Kunkel – drums (6, 10)
- Jimmie Fadden – harmonica (1)
- Gib Guilbeau – fiddle (3)
- Jim Gordon – saxophone (4, 9)
- Nino Tempo – saxophone (4, 9)
- Gail Martin – trombone (4, 9)
- McKinley Johnson – trumpet (4, 9)
- Darrell Leonard – trumpet (4, 9)
- Jim Ed Norman – horn arrangements (4, 9), string arrangements (4)
- Jimmie Haskell – string arrangements (2, 7, 10)
- Sid Sharp – concertmaster (2, 4, 7, 10)
- Ginger Holladay – backing vocals (1, 2, 7)
- Mary Holliday – backing vocals (1, 2, 7)
- Clydie King – backing vocals (4, 6, 10)
- Sherlie Matthews – backing vocals (4, 6, 10)
- Marti McCall – backing vocals (4, 6, 10)
- Wendy Waldman – backing vocals (5)

Technical personnel

- JD Souther – producer, remixing
- John Boylan – co-producer (2, 3, 7, 9)
- Peter Asher – co-producer (6, 10)
- Peter Granet – engineer
- John Haeny – engineer
- Ric Tarantini – engineer
- Al Schmitt – remixing
- Terry Dunavan – mastering at Elektra Sound Recorders (Los Angeles, California).
- Shawn R. Britton – half-speed mastering
- Edmund Meitner – technical support
- Tim de Paravic – remixing
- Terry Dunavan – mastering at Elektra Sound Recorders (Los Angeles, California).
- Shawn R. Britton – half-speed mastering
- Edmund Meitner – technical support
- Tim de Paravicini – technical support
- Glenn Ross – cover design
- Cathy Seeter – cover design
- Ed Caraeff – cover photo
- Terry Wright –ini – technical support
- Glenn Ross – cover design
- Cathy Seeter – cover design
- Ed Caraeff – cover photo
- Terry Wright – sleeve photography

== Charts ==
Chart (1973–1974)	Peak position
Australia Kent Music Report	46
Canada Top Albums (RPM)	57
Japan (Oricon)	161
US Billboard 200	45
US Top Country Albums (Billboard)	5

== Certifications ==
Region	Certification	Certified units/sales
United States (RIAA)	Gold	500,000^{^}
^{^} Shipments figures based on certification alone.

== Release history ==
Release history and formats for Don't Cry Now
Region	Date	Format	Label	Ref.
Australia and New Zealand	October 1, 1973	Asylum Records	LP	
Europe	October 1, 1973	Asylum Records	LP	
Japan	October 1, 1973	Asylum Records	LP	
North America	October 1, 1973	Asylum Records	LP; cassette	
United Kingdom	1974	Asylum Records	LP	
Spain	1974	Asylum Records	LP	
United States	2007	Mobile Fidelity Sound Lab	Compact disc	
United States	2008	Mobile Fidelity Sound Lab	LP	
