= Silver Threads and Golden Needles =

1956 American country song

"Silver Threads and Golden Needles" is a country song written by Dick Reynolds and Jack Rhodes. It was first recorded by Wanda Jackson in 1956. The original lyrics, as performed by Jackson, contain a verse not usually included in later versions, which also often differed in other minor details.

== Other versions ==
"Silver Threads and Golden Needles"

Single by Linda Ronstadt

from the album Don't Cry Now
- B-side: "Don't Cry Now"
- Released: January 1974
- Recorded: June 1973
- Genre: Country
- Length: 2:24
- Label: Asylum 11032
- Songwriters: Jack Rhodes and Dick Reynolds
- Producer: JD Souther

Linda Ronstadt singles chronology
"Love Has No Pride" (1973)	"Silver Threads and Golden Needles" (1974)	"Desperado" (1974)

- In September 1962 a version by UK folk-pop trio the Springfields – featuring Dusty Springfield – reached number 20 on Billboard's Hot 100. It was the first single by a British group to reach the top 20 of the Hot 100.
- Skeeter Davis recorded it in 1962 - after the Springfields' hit - for an album track; Davis's version was released as a single by RCA in several international markets.
- Jody Miller cut it in 1965. It peaked at number 54 on the US Billboard Hot 100.
- The Cowsills recorded the song on their studio album IIxII. It reached number 77 on the US Billboard charts in September 1969.
- Linda Ronstadt recorded and released two versions of the song: the first, a pure country song on her 1969 solo debut album Hand Sown ... Home Grown; the second, a country rock crossover version for her 1973 Don't Cry Now album. The second version was released in January 1974 as a single and was Ronstadt's first country chart hit, getting to number 20. This version also hit the Hot 100, entering the chart on April 6, 1974, and landing at number 67.
- Sandy Denny recorded the song on her final studio album, Rendezvous, released in 1977.
- In 1993, the country trio Dolly Parton, Tammy Wynette and Loretta Lynn recorded the song together on the album Honky Tonk Angels; the song was released as a single, along with an accompanying video. It got to number 68 on the Billboard Hot Country Singles & Tracks chart. Parton had previously performed the song at numerous points over the years, including on her 1976-77 variety show, Dolly!, on which she was joined by guests Linda Ronstadt and Emmylou Harris.
- The song was performed by the Grateful Dead in 1966, 1969 and 1970. They performed the song about 20 times in total. It was also played by Bob Weir with The Waybacks in 2006 and by Phil Lesh and Friends in 2015.
