= Heart Like a Wheel =

Studio album by Linda Ronstadt
- Released: November 19, 1974
- Recorded: June–September 1974
- Studios: The Sound Factory and Clover Recorders, Los Angeles, Track Recorders, Maryland, Record Plant and The Hit Factory, New York City, Trident Studios and AIR Studios, London
- Genres: Country rock; pop rock; soft rock
- Length: 31:40
- Label: Capitol
- Producer: Peter Asher

Linda Ronstadt chronology
Don't Cry Now (1973)	Heart Like a Wheel (1974)	Prisoner in Disguise (1975)

Singles from Heart Like a Wheel
- 1. "You're No Good" Released: November 19, 1974; 2. "I Can't Help It (If I'm Still in Love with You)" Released: November 19, 1974; 3. "When Will I Be Loved" Released: March 25, 1975; 4. "It Doesn't Matter Anymore" Released: March 25, 1975

Heart Like a Wheel is the fifth solo studio album by Linda Ronstadt, released in November 1974. It was Ronstadt's last album to be released by Capitol Records. At the time of its recording, Ronstadt had already moved to Asylum Records and released her first album there; due to contractual obligations, though, Heart Like a Wheel was released by Capitol.

Heart Like a Wheel reached the top of the Billboard 200, becoming her first number one album in the United States. The lead single, a cover of Betty Everett's "You're No Good", peaked at number one on the Billboard Hot 100. At the 18th Annual Grammy Awards, the album was nominated for Album of the Year, while her version of "I Can't Help It If I'm Still in Love with You" won the award for Best Country Vocal Performance, Female.

Widely considered Ronstadt's breakthrough album, it was selected by the Library of Congress to be inducted into the National Recording Registry in 2013. In 2020, it was ranked number 490 on Rolling Stone's 500 Greatest Albums of All Time.

== Critical reception ==
Professional ratings
Review scores
Source	Rating
AllMusic	5/5 stars
Christgau's Record Guide	A−
Pitchfork	8.5/10
The Rolling Stone Album Guide	5/5 stars
Tom Hull	B

Heart Like a Wheel became Ronstadt's first album to hit the top spot on the Billboard Top 200 album chart and spent four weeks at number 1 on the Billboard Country Albums chart in early 1975. "You're No Good", the first single release from the record company, reached number 1 on the Billboard Hot 100. A cover of the Everly Brothers' "When Will I Be Loved" spent two weeks at number 2 on the Hot 100 in June 1975 and reached number 1 on the Cash Box Pop singles chart and on the Hot Country Songs chart. Buddy Holly & the Crickets' song "It Doesn't Matter Anymore", also appeared on the Pop, Adult Contemporary and Country charts.

Stephen Holden's 1975 review Rolling Stone described the title track as "a masterpiece of writing and arrangement" and lauded the album's expansive repertoire, production and song selection. The album's cover of Hank Williams's "I Can't Help It (If I'm Still in Love with You)" peaked at number 2 on Billboard's Hot Country Songs chart.

Heart Like a Wheel spent 51 weeks on the album chart.

Retrospective reviews of Heart Like a Wheel widely regard it as a high-point in Ronstadt's oeuvre. In his review for AllMusic, Stephen Thomas Erlewine described it as "a landmark of '70s mainstream pop/rock." John Lingan claimed in his review for Pitchfork that "[Ronstadt] had one power, but it was a superpower. Viewed from one angle, Linda Ronstadt's career is the story of a woman gradually recognizing the power of her own voice. She had the tone early, but you can hear her control improve in each successive album. Her breaths sound more natural, her vibrato becomes more pronounced. By 'Heart Like a Wheel', she’d mastered it."

In 1976, the album earned Ronstadt four nominations at the Grammy Awards. She won Best Country Vocal Performance, Female for the track "I Can't Help It If I'm Still in Love with You". She was also nominated for Album of the Year and Best Pop Vocal Performance, Female. Producer Peter Asher was among the nominees for Producer of the Year.

The album was ranked No. 490 on the September 22, 2020 edition of Rolling Stone's 500 Greatest Albums of All Time.

Heart Like a Wheel was selected for preservation in the National Recording Registry in 2013 for being "culturally, historically, or aesthetically important."

In 2018, Heart Like a Wheel was inducted into the Grammy Hall of Fame.

== Track listing ==
Side one
No.	Title	Writer(s)	Length
1.	"You're No Good"	Clint Ballard Jr.	3:44
2.	"It Doesn't Matter Anymore"	Paul Anka	3:26
3.	"Faithless Love"	JD Souther	3:15
4.	"The Dark End of the Street"	Chips Moman, Dan Penn	3:55
5.	"Heart Like a Wheel"	Anna McGarrigle	3:10

Side two
No.	Title	Writer(s)	Length
1.	"When Will I Be Loved"	Phil Everly	2:04
2.	"Willin'"	Lowell George	3:02
3.	"I Can't Help It (If I'm Still in Love with You)"	Hank Williams	2:45
4.	"Keep Me from Blowing Away"	Paul Craft	3:10
5.	"You Can Close Your Eyes"	James Taylor	3:09
Total length:			31:40

== Personnel ==
Adapted from the album's liner notes.

- Linda Ronstadt – lead vocals, backing vocals (2, 4, 6, 9)
- Andrew Gold – electric piano (1, 3), electric guitar solo (1), drums (1–3, 7), percussion (1–3), acoustic piano (3–5, 8, 10), electric rhythm guitar (4), tambourine (4, 6), guitars (6), backing vocals (6, 7), acoustic guitar (7, 8), ukulele (8). Credit on album cover: "Special thanks to Andrew Gold for his help with the arrangements."
- Eddie Black – electric guitar (1)
- Bob Warford – acoustic guitar (2, 4, 8), electric guitar solo (4, 7)
- Sneaky Pete Kleinow – pedal steel guitar (2, 7, 8, 10)
- JD Souther – acoustic guitar (3), harmony vocals (3)
- Herb Pedersen – banjo (3), backing vocals (7)
- Paul Craft – acoustic guitar (9)
- John Starling – acoustic guitar (9)
- Danny Pendleton – pedal steel guitar (9)
- John Boylan – acoustic guitar (10)
- Glenn Frey – acoustic guitar (10)
- Kenny Edwards – bass guitar (1, 2, 6–8), backing vocals (6, 7)
- Chris Ethridge – bass guitar (3)
- Emory Gordy Jr. – bass guitar (4)
- Tom Guidera – bass guitar (9)
- Timothy B. Schmit – bass guitar (10)
- Dennis St. John – drums (4)
- Russ Kunkel – drums (6)
- Lloyd Myers – drums (8)
- Don Henley – drums (10)
- Peter Asher – percussion (2), cowbell (6), backing vocals (10)
- Jimmie Fadden – harmonica (2, 7)
- David Lindley – fiddle (5, 8)
- Gregory Rose – string arrangements and conductor (1, 2, 10)
- David Campbell – string arrangements (5), viola (5)
- Dennis Karmazyn – cello (5)
- Richard Feves – double bass (5)
- Clydie King – backing vocals (1)
- Sherlie Matthews – backing vocals (1)
- Wendy Waldman – backing vocals (2)
- Cissy Houston – backing vocals (4)
- Joyce Nesbitt – backing vocals (4)
- Maria Muldaur – backing vocals (5)
- Emmylou Harris – harmony vocals (8)

Production

- Peter Asher – producer
- Val Garay – engineer, mixing
- David Hassinger – engineer, mixing
- Dennis Ferrante – assistant engineer
- John Haeny – assistant engineer
- Peter Kelsey – assistant engineer
- George Massenburg – assistant engineer
- Peter Swettenham – assistant engineer
- Bernie Grundman – mastering at A&M Mastering Studios (Hollywood, California).
- Rod Dyer – design
- Leandro Correa – photography
- Eve Babitz – photography

== Charts ==
=== Weekly charts ===
Chart (1974–1975)	Peak position
Australia Albums (Kent Music Report)	35
Canada Top Albums/CDs (RPM)	7
US Billboard 200	1

=== Year-end charts ===
Chart (1975)	Position
Canada Top Albums/CDs (RPM)	39
US Billboard 200	54

== Certifications ==
Region	Certification	Certified units/sales
United States (RIAA)	2× Platinum	2,000,000^{^}
^{^} Shipments figures based on certification alone.

== Release history ==
Release history and formats for Heart Like a Wheel
Region	Date	Format	Label	Ref.
North America	November 19, 1974	LP; cassette	Asylum Records; Capitol Records	

=== Reissues ===
Year	Label	Edition
2009	Audio Fidelity	24 Karat Gold HDCD
2017	Mobile Fidelity Sound Lab	SACD
