= When Will I Be Loved =

1960 single by the Everly Brothers

Single by The Everly Brothers

from the album The Fabulous Style of The Everly Brothers
- B-side: "Be-Bop-A-Lula"
- Released: May 1960
- Recorded: February 18, 1960
- Genre: Rockabilly; pop
- Length: 2:00
- Label: Cadence
- Songwriter: Phil Everly
- Producer: Wesley Rose

The Everly Brothers singles chronology
"Cathy's Clown" (1960)	"When Will I Be Loved" (1960)	"So Sad" (1960)

Official audio
- "When Will I Be Loved" on YouTube

"When Will I Be Loved" is a popular song written by Phil Everly of the Everly Brothers, who had a US top-ten hit with it in 1960. Linda Ronstadt covered the song in 1975, and her version was an even bigger hit in the US, peaking at No. 2. Vince Gill also covered it in 1994 on the soundtrack of the film 8 Seconds.

== The Everly Brothers version ==
=== Background ===
The Everly Brothers scored a number 8 hit single with "When Will I Be Loved" in the summer of 1960 on the Billboard Hot 100 chart. The track had been recorded in 1960 while the duo were contracted to Cadence Records; they moved to Warner Brothers and rerecorded it in a more mainstream pop/rock style. The belated release by Cadence of "When Will I Be Loved" provided the Everly Brothers with a final rockabilly-style hit.

=== Personnel ===
The session, produced by Archie Bleyer, took place on February 18, 1960, at the RCA Studio in Nashville. Those present at the session included:

- Don Everly – guitar, vocals
- Phil Everly – guitar, vocals
- Chet Atkins, guitar
- Hank Garland, guitar
- Luther Brandon, guitar
- Lightnin Chance, bass
- Buddy Harman, drums
- Floyd Cramer, piano

=== Weekly charts ===
Chart (1960)	Peak position
Australian ARIA Chart	3
Canadian RPM Top Singles	16
UK Singles Chart	4
US Billboard Hot 100	8

=== Year-end charts ===
Chart (1960)	Rank
US Billboard Hot 100	91

== Linda Ronstadt version ==
"When Will I Be Loved"

Single by Linda Ronstadt

from the album Heart Like a Wheel
- B-side: "It Doesn't Matter Anymore"
- Released: March 25, 1975
- Genre: Southern rock; soft rock
- Length: 2:04
- Label: Capitol
- Songwriter: Phil Everly
- Producer: Peter Asher

Linda Ronstadt singles chronology
"You're No Good" (1974)	"When Will I Be Loved" (1975)	"Heat Wave" (1975)

Audio
- "When Will I Be Loved" by Linda Ronstadt on YouTube

=== Background ===
The song had its highest profile when Linda Ronstadt covered it on her album Heart Like A Wheel. This version (which is technically a group vocal with Ronstadt, Kenny Edwards, and a then–up-and-coming singer/songwriter, Andrew Gold) rearranges the verses of the Everly Brothers original, transposing the first and fourth verses. Capitol Records was reportedly unsure whether to release "When Will I Be Loved" or "You're No Good" as the lead 45 off Heart Like a Wheel, finally deciding to issue "You're No Good" as the premier single. "When Will I Be Loved" was issued as the second single in March 1975.

The song hit number 2 on the Billboard Hot 100 in June of that year, as well as number 1 in Cash Box; only the chart dominance of the year's biggest hit, "Love Will Keep Us Together" by Captain & Tennille, prevented Ronstadt from having consecutive number 1 hit singles on the Hot 100. Billboard did afford a number 1 ranking to "When Will I Be Loved" on its C&W chart. The song has sold 268,000 copies in the United States since becoming available for digital download as of January 2020.

As Ronstadt's "When Will I Be Loved" descended the charts, its B-side, a remake of Buddy Holly's "It Doesn't Matter Anymore", garnered enough airplay to chart at number 47 Pop, number 20 Adult Contemporary, and number 54 Country.

=== Charts ===
==== Weekly charts ====
Chart (1975)	Peak position
Canada Top Singles (RPM)	7
Canada Adult Contemporary (RPM)	1
Canada Country Singles (RPM)	1
US Billboard Hot 100	2
US Adult Contemporary (Billboard)	3
US Hot Country Songs (Billboard)	1

==== Year-end charts ====
Chart (1975)	Rank
Canada RPM Top Singles	78
Canada RPM Adult Contemporary	23
US Billboard Hot 100	47
US Adult Contemporary (Billboard)	42
US Hot Country Songs (Billboard)	28
US Cash Box	39

== Little River Band version ==
"When Will I Be Loved"

Single by Little River Band

from the album Too Late to Load
- Released: June 1989
- Label: EMI

Little River Band singles chronology
"Soul Searching" (1988)	"When Will I Be Loved" (1989)	"If I Get Lucky" (1990)

Australian band Little River Band released a version in June 1989 as the only single from the rarities compilation album Too Late to Load. The song peaked at number 169 on the ARIA Charts.

=== Track listing ===
Australian 7" (Capitol Records - CP 1895)
A. "When Will I Be Loved" - 2:50
B. "D" - 3:03

=== Charts ===
Chart (1989)	Peak position
Australia (ARIA Charts)	169
