= The Sound Factory =

Music recording studio in Los Angeles, California

Coordinates: 34.0998°N 118.3283°W

- Industry: Recording studio
- Predecessor: Moonglow Studio
- Founded: 1969 in Los Angeles, California, U.S.
- Founder: David Hassinger
- Successor: Sound Factory
- Headquarters: Los Angeles, California, U.S.
- Number of locations: 1
- Key people: Tutti Camarata
- Website: SoundFactoryHollywood.com

The Sound Factory (also known as Sunset Sound Factory) is a recording studio in Los Angeles, California.

The Sound Factory was built in the 1960s on Selma Avenue in Hollywood. At the time, it served as the home of Moonglow Records and the Moonglow Recording Studio. In 1969, former RCA recording engineer and Warner/Reprise producer David Hassinger purchased the Moonglow Records/Studio building and renamed it The Sound Factory. The studio became one of the most popular recording studios in Hollywood, which led its owner to open a second Sound Factory studio in West Hollywood. The West Hollywood studio was eventually closed.

In November 1981, Sunset Sound Recorders owners Paul and Tutti Camarata purchased the famous studio.

The Sound Factory has been used by many top music artists including Linda Ronstadt (who recorded most of her career-defining hits there), Marvin Gaye, Gram Parsons and the Flying Burrito Brothers (in early 1970, for their 'no nonsense' country album; some of these tracks surfaced on Sleepless Nights), Ringo Starr, Dolly Parton, Sheena Easton, Oingo Boingo, Brian Wilson, the Jackson 5, Red Hot Chili Peppers, Borchardt, Keziah Jones, Lostprophets, Jinx Titanic, the Vines, Tally Hall, Belle and Sebastian, Glen Campbell, Kris Kristofferson, T-Bone Burnett, Elvis Costello, Paul McCartney, Crowded House, Hiroshima, Harry Chapin, and Jschlatt.
