= Linda Ronstadt albums discography =

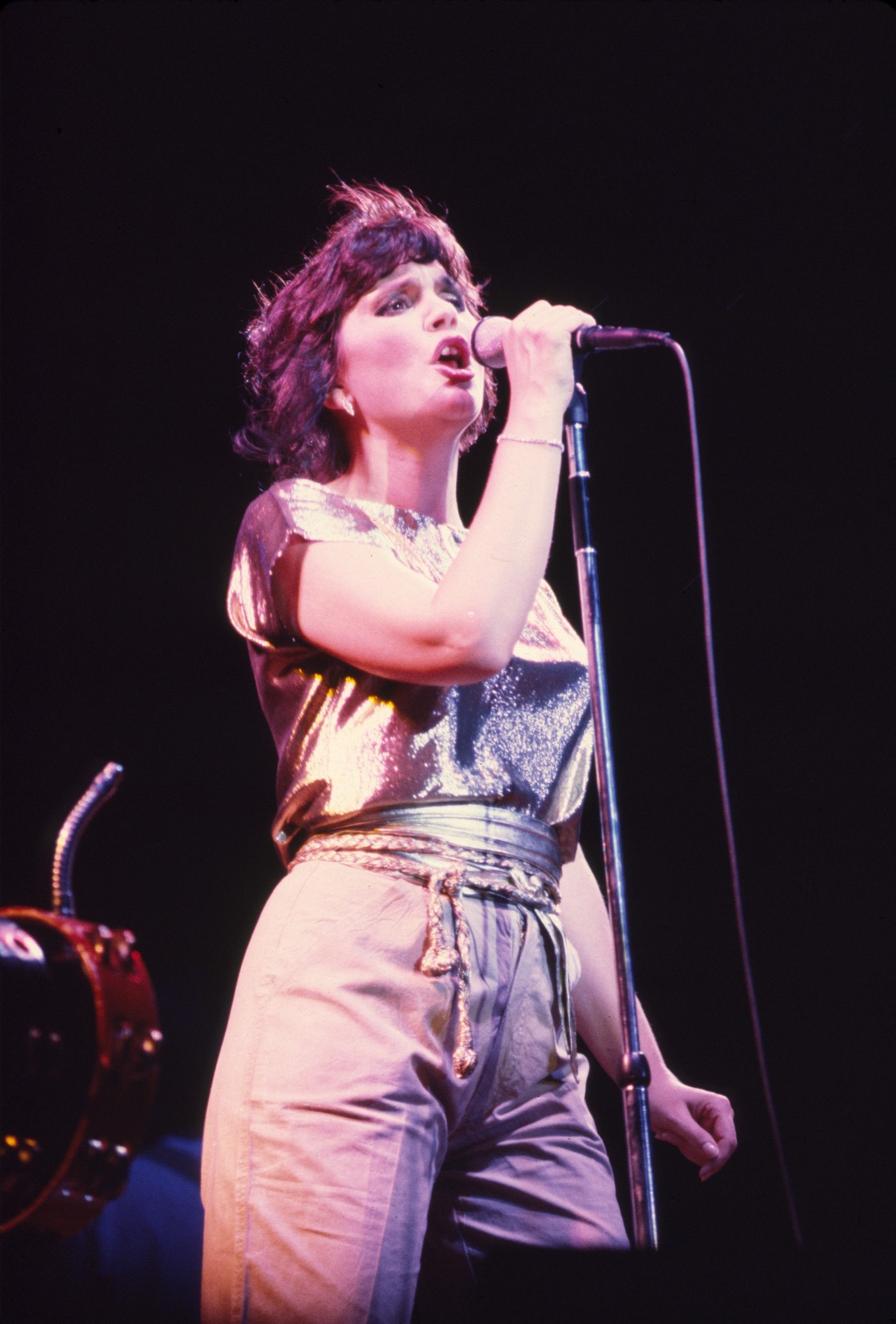
- Linda Ronstadt in concert, 1981.
- Studio albums: 29
- EPs: 2
- Live albums: 1
- Compilation albums: 37
- Box sets: 1

The albums discography of American singer Linda Ronstadt contains 29 studio albums, 37 compilation albums, one live album, one box set and two extended plays (EP's). Her first studio album was a dual credit with the Stone Poneys titled Linda Ronstadt, Stone Poneys and Friends, Vol. III (1968). In 1969, Capitol Records released her first solo studio album was issued titled Hand Sown ... Home Grown. Her 1970 studio album Silk Purse was her first make the charts in the US, Australia and Canada. Ronstadt's 1972 self-titled album made chart positions in the US and Japan.

Her 1973 album Don't Cry Now was issued on Asylum Records and also made multiple charts. It was also her first to certify gold in sales from the Recording Industry Association of America (RIAA). In 1974, Heart Like a Wheel topped the US all-genre chart, reached the top ten in Canada and made the top 40 in Australia. It certified two times platinum by the RIAA for selling two million copies. In 1975, the studio album Prisoner in Disguise certified platinum from the RIAA and made the top five of the US all-genre chart. Hasten Down the Wind (1976) was a top five album in the US and Canada, while also reaching positions in four other countries, including the UK. In the UK, Hasten Down the Wind certified silver in sales from the British Phonographic Industry (BPI).

Also in 1976, Ronstadt's first Greatest Hits compilation album was released. Along with charting in five countries, the album became among her best-selling discs. It certified seven times platinum from the RIAA, four times platinum in Australia (Australian Recording Industry Association) and platinum in Canada (Music Canada). In 1977, Ronstadt's ninth studio album Simple Dreams reached number one in the US, Australia and Canada. It also made the top ten in the Netherlands and New Zealand. Simple Dreams also certified multi-platinum from the ARIA, MC, RMNZ (Recorded Music NZ) and RIAA. Her tenth studio album Living in the USA (1979) also topped the US chart, while reaching the top ten in three additional countries. It was given sales certifications from the ARIA, BPI, RIAA and RMNZ.

Ronstadt's eleventh studio album Mad Love made the top five in the US and Australia, along with reaching platinum sales status in both countries. The same year, Ronstadt's second greatest hits compilation was released and later certified platinum in the US. After the release of the top 40 studio album Get Closer (1982), Ronstadt's next studio release What's New (1983) returned her to the US top ten. It certified platinum in Canada and two times platinum in the US. What's New was followed by two more platinum selling albums. In 1987, Ronstadt collaborated with Emmylou Harris and Dolly Parton for the studio album Trio. It made the top ten in the US, Australia, New Zealand and topped the Canada all-genre chart. The album certified platinum in the US. Later in 1987, Ronstadt's first Spanish language album Canciones de Mi Padre was released. The RIAA later certified it two times platinum. In 1989, Elektra Records issued her eighteenth studio album Cry Like a Rainstorm, Howl Like the Wind. Featuring Aaron Neville, the disc made top ten and top 20 positions in the US, Australia, Canada and the Netherlands. It received sales certifications in four countries including the US, where it certified three times platinum.

Between 1991 and 1992, Elektra issued two more Spanish language studio projects. In 1993, Ronstadt returned to the English market with Winter Light, which made the top 100 in the US, Australia and Canada. Elektra issued three more studio albums of Ronstadt's material through 1998: Feels Like Home, Dedicated to the One I Love and We Ran. In 1999, Asylum Records issued two collaborative albums of Ronstadt's material: Trio II (with Harris and Parton) and Western Wall: The Tucson Sessions (with Harris only). Trio II was Ronstadt's only 1990s album to receive a US sales certification, certifying gold.

Ronstadt's final studio albums were released in the 2000s. In 2000, Elektra issued the studio album A Merry Little Christmas. In 2004, the Verve label released Hummin' to Myself. The 2006 collaborative album with Ann Savoy was her final studio project. All three discs reached lower chart positions on the US all-genre chart. During the 2000s, Elektra/Rhino issued the compilation The Very Best of Linda Ronstadt, which made multiple chart positions and received a gold certification in Australia. In 2014, Rhino issued the compilation Duets, which made the US top 40. In 2016, Rhino issued The Complete Trio Collection. The compilation featuring Ronstadt, Harris and Parton made chart positions in the US, Australia and the UK.

== Studio albums ==
=== 1960s ===
List of studio albums, showing all relevant details
Title	Album details
Linda Ronstadt, Stone Poneys and Friends, Vol. III (with Stone Poneys)	Released: April 1968; Label: Capitol; Formats: LP
Hand Sown ... Home Grown	Released: March 1969; Label: Capitol; Formats: LP

=== 1970s ===
List of studio albums, with selected chart positions and certifications, showing other relevant details
Title	Album details	Peak chart positions								Certifications
Title	Album details	US	AUS	CAN	JPN	ND	NZ	SWE	UK	Certifications
Silk Purse	Released: April 13, 1970; Label: Capitol; Formats: LP	103	34	59	—	—	—	—	—	
Linda Ronstadt	Released: January 17, 1972; Label: Capitol; Formats: LP	163	—	—	87	—	—	—	—	
Don't Cry Now	Released: October 1, 1973; Label: Asylum; Formats: LP, cassette	45	46	57	161	—	—	—	—	RIAA: Gold
Heart Like a Wheel	Released: November 19, 1974; Label: Asylum/Capitol; Formats: LP, cassette	1	35	7	—	—	—	—	—	RIAA: 2× Platinum
Prisoner in Disguise	Released: September 15, 1975; Label: Asylum; Formats: LP, cassette	4	76	13	151	—	—	—	—	RIAA: Platinum
Hasten Down the Wind	Released: August 9, 1976; Label: Asylum; Formats: LP, cassette	3	28	3	74	14	—	—	32	BPI: Silver; RIAA: Platinum
Simple Dreams	Released: September 6, 1977; Label: Asylum; Formats: LP, cassette	1	1	1	38	8	2	46	15	ARIA: 5× Platinum; MC: 2× Platinum; RMNZ: Platinum; RIAA: 3× Platinum
Living in the USA	Released: September 19, 1978; Label: Asylum; Formats: LP, cassette	1	3	9	23	19	3	37	39	ARIA: 2× Platinum; BPI: Silver; RIAA: 2× Platinum; RMNZ: Platinum
"—" denotes a recording that did not chart or was not released in that territory.

=== 1980s ===
List of studio albums, with selected chart positions and certifications, showing other relevant details
Title	Album details	Peak chart positions								Certifications
Title	Album details	US	AUS	CAN	JPN	ND	NZ	NOR	UK	Certifications
Mad Love	Released: February 18, 1980; Label: Asylum; Formats: LP, cassette	3	6	11	12	37	22	34	65	ARIA: Platinum; RIAA: Platinum
Get Closer	Released: September 27, 1982; Label: Asylum; Formats: LP, cassette	31	26	48	28	—	—	27	—	RIAA: Gold
What's New	Released: September 12, 1983; Label: Asylum; Formats: LP, cassette	3	11	18	29	—	21	—	31	MC: Platinum; RIAA: 3× Platinum
Lush Life	Released: November 16, 1984; Label: Asylum; Formats: LP, CD, Cassette	13	32	35	—	—	38	—	100	RIAA: Platinum
For Sentimental Reasons	Released: September 22, 1986; Label: Asylum; Formats: LP, CD, cassette	46	43	72	34	—	—	—	—	RIAA: Platinum
Trio (with Emmylou Harris and Dolly Parton)	Released: March 2, 1987; Label: Warner Bros.; Formats: LP, CD, cassette	6	4	1	—	22	6	—	60	RMNZ: Gold; RIAA: Platinum
Canciones de Mi Padre	Released: November 13, 1987; Label: Asylum; Formats: LP, CD, cassette	54	—	42	—	—	—	—	—	RIAA: 2× Platinum
Cry Like a Rainstorm, Howl Like the Wind (featuring Aaron Neville)	Released: October 2, 1989; Label: Elektra; Formats: LP, CD, cassette	7	11	6	65	13	41	—	43	ARIA: Gold; BPI: Gold; MC: Platinum; RIAA: 3× Platinum
"—" denotes a recording that did not chart or was not released in that territory.

=== 1990s ===
List of studio albums, with selected chart positions and certifications, showing other relevant details
Title	Album details	Peak chart positions							Certifications
Title	Album details	US	AUS	CAN	JPN	ND	NOR	SWE	Certifications
Mas Canciones	Released: November 19, 1991; Label: Elektra; Formats: CD, cassette	88	183	—	—	—	—		
Frenesí	Released: September 15, 1992; Label: Elektra; Formats: CD, cassette	193	197	—	79	—	—	—	
Winter Light	Released: November 23, 1993; Label: Elektra; Formats: CD, cassette	92	98	50	—	—	—	—	
Feels Like Home	Released: March 14, 1995; Label: Elektra; Formats: CD, cassette	75	140	—	—	—	—	—	
Dedicated to the One I Love	Released: June 25, 1996; Label: Elektra; Formats: CD, cassette	78	190	—	—	—	—	—	
We Ran	Released: June 23, 1998; Label: Elektra; Formats: CD, cassette	160	181	—	—	—	—	—	
Trio II (with Emmylou Harris and Dolly Parton)	Released: February 9, 1999; Label: Asylum; Formats: CD, cassette	62	66	—	—	69	—	—	RIAA: Gold
Western Wall: The Tucson Sessions (with Emmylou Harris)	Released: August 24, 1999; Label: Asylum; Formats: CD, cassette	73	163	—	—	—	35	41	
"—" denotes a recording that did not chart or was not released in that territory.

=== 2000s ===
List of studio albums, with selected chart positions, showing other relevant details
Title	Album details	Peak chart positions	
Title	Album details	US	AUS
A Merry Little Christmas	Released: October 17, 2000; Label: Elektra; Formats: CD	179	—
Hummin' to Myself	Released: November 9, 2004; Label: Verve; Formats: CD	166	—
Adieu False Heart (with Ann Savoy)	Released: June 25, 2006; Label: Vanguard; Formats: CD	146	189
"—" denotes a recording that did not chart or was not released in that territory.

== Compilation albums ==
=== 1970s ===
List of compilations albums, with selected chart positions and certifications, showing other relevant details
Title	Album details	Peak chart positions					Certifications
Title	Album details	US	AUS	CAN	NZ	UK	Certifications
Te Voy A Amar Un Largo Tiempo	Released: 1972; Label: Capitol; Formats: LP	—	—	—	—	—	
Linda Ronstadt	Released: 1972; Label: Capitol; Formats: LP	—	—	—	—	—	
Different Drum	Released: January 1974; Label: Capitol; Formats: LP	92	—	—	—	—	
2 Originals of Linda Ronstadt (with the Stone Poneys)	Released: 1975; Label: Capitol; Formats: LP, cassette	—	—	—	—	—	
Linda Ronstadt's Greatest Hits	Released: 1975; Label: Capitol; Formats: LP, cassette	—	—	—	—	—	
Greatest Hits	Released: December 1, 1976; Label: Asylum; Formats: LP, cassette	6	22	55	18	37	ARIA: 4× Platinum; MC: Platinum; RIAA: 7× Platinum; RMNZ: Gold
A Retrospective	Released: April 1977; Label: Capitol; Formats: LP, cassette	46	—	—	—	—	RIAA: Gold
The Southern Belle	Released: 1977; Label: Capitol; Formats: LP	—	—	—	—	—	
"—" denotes a recording that did not chart or was not released in that territory.

=== 1980s ===
List of compilations albums, with selected chart positions and certifications, showing other relevant details
Title	Album details	Peak chart positions				Certifications
Title	Album details	US	AUS	CAN	NZ	Certifications
Greatest Hits Volume Two	Released: October 1980; Label: Asylum; Formats: LP, cassette	26	53	39	32	RIAA: Platinum
For Country Lovers	Released: 1981; Label: Capitol; Formats: LP, cassette	—	—	—	—	
Greatest Hits	Released: 1981; Label: Asylum/k-Tel; Formats: LP	—	41	—	—	
Blue Bayou	Released: 1982; Label: Asylum; Formats: LP	—	—	—	—	
The Very Best	Released: 1982; Label: Asylum; Formats: LP	—	—	—	—	
Prime of Life	Released: 1984; Label: Capitol Special Markets; Formats: LP	—	—	—	—	
I'll Be Your Baby Tonight	Released: 1984; Label: Capitol; Formats: Cassette	—	—	—	—	
When Will I Be Loved	Released: 1985; Label: Capitol; Formats: Cassette	—	—	—	—	
Country and Rock Favorites	Released: 1985; Label: Capitol; Formats: Cassette	—	—	—	—	
'Round Midnight	Released: 1986; Label: Elektra; Formats: LP, CD, cassette	124	—	—	—	RIAA: Gold
Rockfile	Released: 1986; Label: Capitol Special Markets; Formats: LP, cassette	—	—	—	—	
"—" denotes a recording that did not chart or was not released in that territory.

=== 1990s ===
List of compilation albums, showing all relevant details
Title	Album details
Linda Ronstadt: A Retrospective	Released: 1990; Label: Elektra; Formats: CD
Boleros Y Rancheras	Released: 1993; Label: WEA/Elektra; Formats: LP, CD, cassette
Her Greatest Hits and Finest Performances	Released: 1997; Label: Reader's Digest/Warner; Formats: CD
Required Ronstadt	Released: 1998; Label: Elektra; Formats: CD

=== 2000s ===
List of compilations albums, with selected chart positions and certifications, showing other relevant details
Title	Album details	Peak chart positions			Certifications
Title	Album details	US	AUS	UK	Certifications
The Very Best of Linda Ronstadt	Released: September 24, 2002; Label: Elektra/Rhino; Formats: CD	165	84	46	ARIA: Gold
Mi Jardin Azul: Las Canciones Favoritas	Released: April 27, 2004; Label: Elektra/Rhino; Formats: CD	—	—	—	
Greatest Hits	Released: 2005; Label: Warner; Formats: CD	—	—	—	
The Best of Linda Ronstadt: The Capitol Years	Released: January 24, 2006; Label: Capitol/EMI; Formats: CD	—	—	—	
The Platinum Collection	Released: October 29, 2007; Label: Warner Platinum; Formats: CD	—	—	—	
Collector's Edition	Released: March 31, 2009; Label: Madacy; Formats: CD	—	—	—	
"—" denotes a recording that did not chart or was not released in that territory.

=== 2010s ===
List of compilations albums, with selected chart positions and certifications, showing other relevant details
Title	Album details	Peak chart positions		
Title	Album details	US	AUS	UK
Duets	Released: April 8, 2014; Label: Rhino; Formats: CD, digital	32	131	—
Icon: Linda Ronstadt	Released: August 5, 2014; Label: Capitol; Formats: CD	—	—	—
Opus Collection	Released: September 2014; Label: Rhino; Formats: CD	65	—	—
My Dear Companion: Selections from the Trio Collection (with Emmylou Harris and Dolly Parton)	Released: June 15, 2015; Label: Rhino; Formats: CD, digital	—	—	—
Just One Look: Classic Linda Ronstadt	Released: August 21, 2015; Label: Elektra/Rhino; Formats: LP, CD, digital	—	—	—
Greatest Hits	Released: 2015; Label: Elektra/Rhino; Formats: Digital	—	—	—
The Complete Trio Collection (with Emmylou Harris and Dolly Parton)	Released: September 9, 2016; Label: Rhino; Formats: CD, digital	124	3	47
Farther Along (with Emmylou Harris and Dolly Parton)	Released: September 9, 2016; Label: Rhino; Formats: LP	—	—	—
"—" denotes a recording that did not chart or was not released in that territory.

== Live albums ==
List of live albums, with selected chart positions, showing other relevant details
Title	Album details	Peak chart positions
Title	Album details	US
Live in Hollywood	Released: February 1, 2019; Label: Rhino; Formats: LP, CD, digital	97

== Box sets ==
List of box sets, showing all relevant details
Title	Album details
The Linda Ronstadt Box Set	Released: November 16, 1999; Label: Elektra; Formats: CD

== Extended plays ==
List of EP's, showing all relevant details
Title	Album details
The Best of Linda Ronstadt	Released: 1977; Label: Asylum; Formats: Vinyl EP
I Am Woman	Released: March 1, 2022; Label: UMG; Formats: Digital
