= Linda Ronstadt, Stone Poneys and Friends, Vol. III =

Studio album by The Stone Poneys
- Released: April 29, 1968
- Recorded: 1967–68
- Studio: Capitol (Hollywood)
- Genre: Folk rock
- Length: 27:18
- Label: Capitol
- Producer: Nik Venet

The Stone Poneys chronology
Evergreen, Volume 2 (1967)	Linda Ronstadt, Stone Poneys and Friends, Vol. III (1968)	Stoney End (1970)

Linda Ronstadt chronology
Evergreen, Volume 2 (1967)	Linda Ronstadt, Stone Poneys and Friends, Vol. III (1968)	Hand Sown ... Home Grown (1969)

Singles from Linda Ronsatdt, Stone Poneys and Friends, Vol. III
- 1. "Up to My Neck in Muddy Water" Released: March, 1968; 2. "Some of Shelly's Blues" Released: June, 1968

Professional ratings
Review scores
Source	Rating
Allmusic	3/5 stars

Linda Ronstadt, Stone Poneys and Friends, Vol. III is the third and final studio album by The Stone Poneys, released on April 29, 1968. Singer Linda Ronstadt would release her first solo album the following year.

While ostensibly a Stone Poneys album, Vol. III represents a transition and a shift in focus from the first two releases by the band, formed in 1965 as a harmony group with Ronstadt as an occasional soloist, to the singer's solo career. Billing Ronstadt as the lead singer (in concert bookings as well as on the third album) was demanded by Capitol Records executives and encouraged by producer Nik Venet, who all saw her potential as a solo artist with the recording and subsequent success of "Different Drum," a single from the previous album. The song, 'featuring Linda Ronstadt', was backed by outside musicians instead of her bandmates Kenny Edwards and Bobby Kimmel – creating tensions in the band that would worsen, irrevocably damaging morale. Edwards quit the group during the recording sessions for their third album, following a brief tour in early 1968; and Kimmel would leave later that year.

The new direction meant augmenting the trio with extra musicians, and downplaying Edwards' and Kimmel's songwriting contributions in favor of new repertoire in a different musical style. Rather than the folk rock of the first two Stone Poneys albums, most of the songs on Vol. III are in the country rock style that would mark Ronstadt's subsequent work. This is particularly true of the two songs released as singles, "Some of Shelly's Blues" and "Up to My Neck in High Muddy Water".

All three band members were pictured on the covers of the first two albums, while only Ronstadt appears on this front cover. The back cover photo shows her among a group of friends and neighbors (including musicologist Charles Seeger and singer-songwriter Tim Buckley) in front of the house on Hart Avenue in Santa Monica, California, that was a communal residence for some of them, including Ronstadt (Seeger and Buckley lived nearby).

== Release data ==
The album was released in April 1968 in the LP format by Capitol in both monaural and stereophonic editions (catalogue numbers T 2863 and ST 2863, respectively), and on 8-track tape (8XT 2863). A Capitol CD reissue appeared in 1995 (catalogue number 80130). The volume number in the title uses a Roman numeral rather than the Arabic numeral used on the previous release.

Several of the songs from Vol. III appear on subsequent compilations, including Stoney End on Pickwick Records in 1972 and Different Drum in 1974, the latter album a Capitol release credited solely to Linda Ronstadt. In 2008, Raven Records in Australia issued a 27-track CD, The Stone Poneys, comprising all the tracks from the band's first two albums, The Stone Poneys and Evergreen, Volume 2, plus four tracks from the third album.

== Notes on the tracks ==
Vol. III includes only two Bobby Kimmel-Kenny Edwards compositions. For the remaining tracks, Ronstadt sought out material by such well-regarded songwriters as Tim Buckley and Laura Nyro, as well as songs by writers represented on the first two albums, like Michael Nesmith, and Steve Gillette and Tom Campbell, who composed the short song fragments that open the album.

The Stone Poneys' only charting success with this material was the single "Up to My Neck in High Muddy Water", which reached No. 93 on the Billboard Hot 100. The Greenbriar Boys had originally recorded the song for their 1966 album Better Late than Never! – the album that also introduced Ronstadt and the band to the Mike Nesmith song "Different Drum", their major hit single from Evergreen, Volume 2.

Nesmith's "Some of Shelly's Blues" was a non-charting single for the band. Nesmith is best known as a member of The Monkees, who recorded this song in the 1960s, although their version would remain unreleased until the early 1990s. Nesmith included his version on his album Pretty Much Your Standard Ranch Stash (1973). The song also was the opening track on The Nitty Gritty Dirt Band's 1970 album, Uncle Charlie & His Dog Teddy; and reached No. 64 on the Billboard singles chart in 1971, as one of two follow-up singles to their biggest hit, "Mr. Bojangles". The following year, the Dirt Band backed Earl Scruggs in a cover version on I Saw the Light with Some Help from My Friends, an album on which Ronstadt also appears; and it also appears on their 1982 live album The Dirt Band Tonite. Mary McCaslin recorded two Vol. III songs, including "Some of Shelly's Blues" for her 1981 album A Life and Time.

Several other now-familiar songs also appear on this album. "Let's Get Together" – also known as "Get Together" and sometimes credited to its writer's stage name, Dino Valenti – was first recorded by the mainstream folk-pop band the Kingston Trio in 1964. Best known from the Top 5 hit in 1969 by The Youngbloods (who originally released it in 1967), the song is widely regarded as a quintessential hippie/flower power appeal for peace and brotherhood. It was recorded in the 1960s by many other artists, including Judy Collins, Jefferson Airplane and The Byrds. In 1965, a version by We Five reached No. 31 on the singles charts, as a follow-up to their major hit "You Were on My Mind".

The Laura Nyro song that closes Vol. III – from her 1967 debut More Than a New Discovery – was also the title track of Barbra Streisand's first Top 10 album in five years, 1971's Stoney End, and a single of Streisand's version reached No. 6 on the Billboard Hot 100. Peggy Lipton also recorded "Stoney End" for a 1968 single.

"Morning Glory" – from Tim Buckley's second album, Goodbye and Hello (1967) – was renamed by Ronstadt and appears as "Hobo" on Vol. III. Cover versions (with the original title) also appeared around the same time on Blood, Sweat and Tears' first album, Child Is Father to the Man (1968); and on McKendree Spring's 1969 debut album. A live performance of the song in 1968 by Fairport Convention was included as a bonus track on the 2003 reissue of their debut, Fairport Convention.

The other two Tim Buckley songs come from his debut, Tim Buckley (1966). During her brief time with Capitol Records, Mary McCaslin recorded "Aren't You the One" around the same time as the Stone Poneys, using the same producer (Venet); it appears among other previously unreleased material on her 1999 release Rain: The Lost Album. (Buckley's original title was "Aren't You the Girl".)

== Album credits ==
Ronstadt is well known in the music industry for including very meticulous credits on her albums, particularly with regard to musicians. (For example, her first two "Greatest Hits" LPs feature credits for all the songs on the inside gatefold cover panels.) On Evergreen, Volume 2, a total of 22 musicians were listed, including nine in the string section. However, despite the "and Friends" of the title, there are no credits on the inside sleeve or back cover of Vol. III, and allmusic lists only the three band members in its entry for the album.

== Track listing ==
Side one
No.	Title	Writer(s)	Length
1.	"Fragments: Golden Song" / "Merry-Go-Round" / "Love Is a Child"	Steve Gillette / Tom Campbell / Steve Gillette	1:40
2.	"By the Fruits of their Labors"	Bob Kimmel, Ken Edwards	2:05
3.	"Hobo" (originally titled "Morning Glory")	Tim Buckley, Larry Beckett	3:00
4.	"Star and a Stone"	Kimmel, Edwards	3:33
5.	"Let's Get Together"	Chet Powers	3:10

Side two
No.	Title	Writer(s)	Length
1.	"Up to My Neck in High Muddy Water"	Frank Wakefield, Bob Yellin, John Herald	2:35
2.	"Aren't You the One" (originally titled "Aren't You the Girl")	Tim Buckley	2:30
3.	"Wings"	Tim Buckley	3:00
4.	"Some of Shelly's Blues"	Mike Nesmith	2:10
5.	"Stoney End"	Laura Nyro	3:35

== Personnel ==
=== Original band members ===
- Bob Kimmel, guitar
- Kenny Edwards, guitar
- Linda Ronstadt, lead vocals

== Release history ==
Release history and formats for Linda Ronstadt, Stone Poneys and Friends, Vol. III
Region	Date	Format	Label	Ref.
North America	April 1968	LP	Capitol Records	
