= Silk Purse (Linda Ronstadt album) =

Studio album by Linda Ronstadt
- Released: April 13, 1970
- Recorded: January–February 1970
- Studio: Cinderella Sound (Nashville, Tennessee); Woodland (Nashville, Tennessee)
- Genre: Country; pop
- Length: 29:14
- Label: Capitol
- Producer: Elliot F. Mazer

Linda Ronstadt chronology
Hand Sown ... Home Grown (1969)	Silk Purse (1970)	Linda Ronstadt (1972)

Singles from Silk Purse
- 1. "Will You Love Me Tomorrow?" Released: March 2, 1970; 2. "Long Long Time" Released: June 15, 1970

Silk Purse is a studio album by American singer Linda Ronstadt. It was released by Capitol Records on April 13, 1970 and was Ronstadt's second solo studio album in her career. Silk Purse contained a total of ten tracks that experimented with country music. It included covers of songs by Hank Williams and Mel Tillis. Featured on the album were two singles. Among them was the song "Long Long Time", which became Ronstadt's first charting single in the US and Canada. Silk Purse was given positive reviews from several publications including AllMusic and Cashbox. It was Ronstadt's first to make chart positions in Australia, Canada and the US.

== Background ==
Linda Ronstadt had been a member of the folk group the Stone Poneys and they had a top 20 US single with 1967's "Different Drum". The group's two other members (Kenny Edwards and Bobby Kimmel) left the Stone Poneys shortly afterward for a quieter existence. Capitol Records wanted to still invest in Ronstadt which forced her towards a solo career. Because Ronstadt was used to having Kimmel write songs to record, Ronstadt needed songs to record. She chose to draw from the catalog of country music which she heard as a child. Country would be the musical focus for her first two solo albums at Capitol: Hand Sown ... Home Grown (1969) and Silk Purse.

== Recording and content ==
Silk Purse was recorded at Cinderella Sound Studios and Woodland Sound Studios. Both studios were located in Nashville, Tennessee. Ronstadt herself also noted that some of the album was also completed in San Francisco, California. The album was produced by Elliot F. Mazer. Mazer was part of a group of Nashville session musicians called Area Code 615, which played on Silk Purse. "It was an unusual sound for the time with an touching emotional quality," Ronstadt later wrote of the recording experience. The album was produced between January and February 1970.

Silk Purse consisted of ten tracks. Among the album's new songs was "Long Long Time", which Ronstadt had found from its songwriter Gary White. White also wrote the original tune "Nobody's". Gene Clark and Bernie Leadon wrote the song "He Darked the Sun" while Paul Siebel wrote the song "Louise". The latter track was about a prostitute. Other tracks were covers of country songs such as Hank Williams's "Lovesick Blues" and Mel Tillis's "Mental Revenge". One gospel cover is also included titled "Life Is Like a Mountain Railway" and a cover of the R&B song "I'm Leaving It All Up to You".

== Critical reception ==
Professional ratings
Review scores
Source	Rating
AllMusic	3.5/5 stars
Christgau's Record Guide	B
Rolling Stone	(mixed)

Three months after the album's release, Rolling Stone's Alec Dubro reviewed Silk Purse in the magazine's June 25 issue. "Some of the material is raw imitation and some is more original, but none is very far from the soul of the singer," Dubro wrote. "It is Linda Ronstadt's voice that makes this record; she endows the songs with a feeling that she has shown since the first Stone Poneys' album, and she has developed her Country style considerably since her last album." Lester Bangs also reviewed the album in Penthouse, writing: "Linda Ronstadt's vocal style is like her physical presence: brimming with passion and vulnerability, tremulous, yet possessed of a core of absolute strength."

Music critic Robert Christgau commended Ronstadt for her choice of tunes but noted that "only occasionally – "Lovesick Blues" and "Long Long Time" are both brilliant – does she seem to find Kitty Wells's soul as well as her timbre." Billboard magazine commented that Ronstadt, "has proven she can go it alone [solo], and this album entry makes that even more evident." Cashbox magazine called it "an exceptional LP". Stephen Thomas Erlewine of AllMusic gave Silk Purse three and a half stars and wrote, "perhaps she didn't find her voice, not in the way she would a year later on her eponymous record, but this Nashville excursion had a clarifying effect, whittling down the musical excesses and strengthening her aesthetic while winding up a nifty little record in its own right."

== Release, chart performance and singles ==
Silk Purse was originally released by Capitol Records on April 13, 1970. It was the second studio album in Ronstadt's career that solely credited her and not the Stone Poneys. The album was distributed as a vinyl LP, 8-track and cassette containing five selections on each side of the record. Silk Purse was Ronstadt's first album to make the US Billboard 200 chart, reaching number 103 after ten weeks. On Canada's RPM Top Albums chart, Silk Purse climbed to the number 59 position. On Australia's Kent Music Report chart, it made the top 40, climbing to number 34. Two singles were spawned from the album, beginning with Ronstadt's cover of "Will You Love Me Tomorrow" in March 1970. It only charted in Australia, reaching number 100 on the Kent Music Report chart. It was followed by the new track "Long Long Time". It was Ronstadt's first charting record as a solo artist in the US and Canada, climbing to number 25 on the Hot 100 and number 15 on the RPM Top Singles chart.

Reflecting on the Silk Purse to Rolling Stone in 1975, Ronstadt commented, "I hate that album. I'm sure Elliot [Mazer] doesn't think it's very good either. I couldn't sing then, I didn't know what I was doing."

== Track listing ==
Side one
No.	Title	Writer(s)	Length
1.	"Lovesick Blues"	C. Friend; I. Mills	2:07
2.	"Are My Thoughts with You?"	Mickey Newbury	2:47
3.	"Will You Love Me Tomorrow"	G. Goffin; C. King	2:27
4.	"Nobody's"	Gary White	2:56
5.	"Louise"	Paul Siebel	3:25

Side two
No.	Title	Writer(s)	Length
1.	"Long Long Time"	White	4:21
2.	"Mental Revenge"	Mel Tillis	2:46
3.	"I'm Leaving It All Up to You"	D. Harris; D. Terry	2:21
4.	"He Darked the Sun"	G. Clark; B. Leadon	2:40
5.	"Life Is Like a Mountain Railway"	Traditional (arranged by Elliot Mazer and Linda Ronstadt)	3:24

== Personnel ==
All credits are adapted from the liner notes of Silk Purse.

- Fred Catero – Recording engineer
- Howard Gale – Recording engineer
- Lee Hazin – Recording engineer
- Elliot F. Mazer – Producer, recording and mixing engineer
- Adam Mitchell – Musical director
- Wayne Moss – Recording engineer

== Charts ==
Chart (1970)	Peak position
Australia Kent Music Report	34
Canada Top Albums (RPM)	59
US Billboard 200	103

== Release history ==
Release history and formats for Silk Purse
Region	Date	Format	Label	Ref.
Australia	April 13, 1970	LP	Capitol Records	
North America	April 13, 1970	LP	Capitol Records	
Netherlands	1976	LP	Capitol Records	
South Korea	1977	LP	Capitol Records	
Japan	1979	LP	Capitol Records	
North America	1995	CD	Capitol Records	
Japan	2014	CD	Capitol Records	
North America	2015	LP	Capitol Records; Varèse Vintage; Universal Special Markets	
North America	circa 2020	Music download; streaming	Capitol Records	
