= Evergreen, Volume 2 =

Evergreen, Vol. 2

Studio album by The Stone Poneys
- Released: June 12, 1967
- Recorded: Spring 1967
- Studio: Capitol (Hollywood)
- Genres: Folk rock; psychedelic rock
- Length: 32:51
- Label: Capitol
- Producer: Nick Venet

The Stone Poneys chronology
The Stone Poneys (1967)	Evergreen, Vol. 2 (1967)	Linda Ronstadt, Stone Poneys & Friends, Vol. III (1968)

Singles from Evergreen, Vol. 2
- 1. "One for One" Released: June, 1967; 2. "Different Drum" Released: September, 1967

Professional ratings
Review scores
Source	Rating
Allmusic	3/5 stars

Evergreen, Vol. 2 is the second album from the Stone Poneys, released five months after The Stone Poneys. It was the most commercially successful of the Stone Poneys' three studio albums.

== Release data ==
The album was released in the LP format on Capitol in June 1967 in both monaural and stereophonic editions (catalogue numbers T 2763 and ST 2763, respectively), and subsequently, on 8-track tape (catalogue number 8XT 2763) and cassette (catalogue number C4-80129). In 1995, Capitol reissued the album on CD (catalogue number CDP-80129).

Raven issued a 27-track "two-fer" CD In 2008, featuring all tracks from this and the band's first album (under its 1975 reissue name, The Stone Poneys Featuring Linda Ronstadt), plus four tracks from their third album, Linda Ronstadt, Stone Poneys and Friends, Vol. III.

== Notes on the tracks ==
In a departure from the first album, Linda Ronstadt was the lead vocalist on almost all songs, with only occasional harmony vocals. The exception is the title song, "Evergreen" (also released on the B-side of the album's first single, "One for One"). Kenny Edwards sang lead on "Part One", while "Part Two" is an instrumental. Both parts have a psychedelic rock feel and feature sitar playing (also by Edwards).

The album contains the band's biggest hit, "Different Drum", written by Mike Nesmith prior to his joining The Monkees. The Stone Poneys' version went to No. 12 on Billboard's Hot 100 chart (with 'featuring Linda Ronstadt' on the single label; she was the only band member on the track). As Edwards recalled, the band based their original recording of the song on a version by The Greenbriar Boys from their 1966 album Better Late than Never!: "We cut a version very much like that, with mandolin, kind of a jug bandy, bluegrass-lite version." Record producer Nik Venet, sensing that the song could be a hit, had Ronstadt re-record it with other musicians. However, "Different Drum" did not chart until November 1967, after the band's four-month tour to support the album; Edwards had already left the Stone Poneys by then.

The first single from the album, "One for One," did not chart. It was co-written by Austin DeLone, later a member of seminal country rock band Eggs Over Easy, a group credited with launching the pub rock movement in Great Britain.

Five of the songs were co-written by band members Bobby Kimmel and Edwards. Kimmel also co-wrote "New Hard Times" – with the unusual theme of examining the downside of '60s affluence – with Mayne Smith, a member of the San Francisco Bay Area's first bluegrass band, the Redwood Canyon Ramblers.

Many of the other songwriters featured on the album, like the Stone Poneys themselves, were struggling singer-songwriters on the Los Angeles folk scene. Steve Gillette contributed "Song about the Rain" and "Back on the Street Again", and sang harmony vocals with Ronstadt on the latter. Sunshine Company had their biggest hit with "Back on the Street Again" (reaching No. 36 in Billboard); and Gillette included it on his eponymous debut album; both versions were released in 1967. More than 30 years later, West Coast bluegrass band Laurel Canyon Ramblers (led by Herb Pederson) released the song as the title track of their third CD, in 1998.

"December Dream," the album's opening track, was written by John Braheny, who had a brief career as a singer-songwriter before moving on to other areas of the music business. Fred Neil recorded the song in the same general time period, although it remained unreleased until the 1998 double-CD compilation album The Many Sides of Fred Neil. Braheny also included it on his eccentric 1970 LP, Some Kind of Change.

== Track listing ==
Side one
No.	Title	Writer(s)	Length
1.	"December Dream"	John Braheny	3:30
2.	"Song About the Rain"	Steve Gillette	2:40
3.	"Autumn Afternoon"	Ken Edwards/Bobby Kimmel	2:35
4.	"I've Got to Know"	Pamela Polland	2:38
5.	"Evergreen (Part One)"	Edwards/Kimmel	3:10
6.	"Evergreen (Part Two)" (instrumental)	Edwards/Kimmel	3:33

Side two
No.	Title	Writer(s)	Length
1.	"Different Drum"	Mike Nesmith	2:45
2.	"Driftin'"	Edwards/Kimmel	2:30
3.	"One for One"	Al Silverman/Austin DeLone	2:50
4.	"Back on the Street Again"	Steve Gillette	1:50
5.	"Toys in Time"	Edwards/Kimmel	1:50
6.	"New Hard Times"	Mayne Smith/Kimmel	3:00

== Personnel ==
=== Band members ===
- Linda Ronstadt: lead vocals, finger cymbals
- Bobby Kimmel: guitar
- Kenny Edwards: guitar, sitar

=== Contributing musicians ===
- Guitar: Dennis Budimir, Pete Childs, Cyrus Faryar, John Forsha, Steve Gillette, Bernie Leadon
- Bass guitar: Jimmy Bond, Joe Osborn
- Drums: Jim Gordon, Billy Mundi
- Harpsichord: Don Randi
- Strings: Norman Botnick, William Durasch, Jesse Ehrlich, Harry Hyams, William Kurasch, Leonard Malarsky, Stanley Plummer, Sidney Sharp, Robert Sushel
