= Stoney End (Stone Poneys album) =

Compilation album by The Stone Poneys
- Released: 1972 (U.S.), 1976 (Canada)
- Recorded: 1967–68
- Genre: Folk rock
- Label: Pickwick

The Stone Poneys chronology
Linda Ronstadt, Stone Poneys and Friends, Vol. III (1968)	Stoney End (1972)

Stoney End is a 1972 compilation album of previously released songs by folk rock band The Stone Poneys featuring singer Linda Ronstadt. It was released by Pickwick Records in the U.S. and Canada.

== The recording ==
The nine songs on the compilation all feature Ronstadt, a major star by the time of its release, on lead vocals; and are taken from the Stone Poneys' second and third albums, Evergreen, Volume 2 and Linda Ronstadt, Stone Poneys and Friends, Vol. III, from 1967 and 1968, respectively. The material was licensed by Pickwick from Capitol Records and the album was released on vinyl, cassette and 8-track.

== Track listing ==
=== Side 1 ===
1. "Wings" (Tim Buckley) – 2:57
2. "Different Drum" (Mike Nesmith) – 2:38
3. "Some of Shelly's Blues" (Mike Nesmith) – 2:11
4. "Driftin'" (K. Edwards/B. Kimmel) – 2:30
5. "Stoney End" (Laura Nyro) – 2:40

=== Side 2 ===
1. "December Dream" (John Braheny) – 3:25
2. "Hobo" (Tim Buckley) – 3:04
3. "One For One" (Al Silverman/Austin de Lone) – 2:50
4. "Let's Get Together" (Dino Valenti (Note: On the Side 2 label, "Let's Get Together" is credited to Dino Valenti, the stage name of songwriter Chet Powers, who wrote it in 1963. On most releases of this song, a 1969 hit for The Youngbloods, Powers’ name is credited.)) – 3:10
