= Hand Sown ... Home Grown =

Studio album by Linda Ronstadt
- Released: March 1969
- Genres: Country rock; folk
- Length: 31:50
- Label: Capitol
- Producer: Chip Douglas

Linda Ronstadt chronology
Linda Ronstadt, Stone Poneys and Friends, Vol. III (1968)	Hand Sown ... Home Grown (1969)	Silk Purse (1970)

Singles from Hand Sown...Home Grown
- 1. "Baby You've Been on My Mind" Released: 1969; 2. "The Long Way Around" Released: March 1969

Hand Sown ... Home Grown is a studio album by American singer Linda Ronstadt. It was originally released by Capitol Records in March 1969.

This the first album credited entirely to Rondstadt as a solo performer. The eleven tracks fused the country rock and folk genres, and feature a mix of covers and newly written material. The album received a positive response from critics following its release.

== Background and recording ==
Linda Ronstadt had become successful as part of the folk trio the Stone Poneys (which also included Bob Kimmel and Kenny Edwards). In 1967 they had a top 20 single with the song "Different Drum". Then, Edwards and Kimmel left the Stone Poneys in favor of other professional opportunities. Ronstadt decided to pursue a solo career. Capitol Records wanted to invest in Ronstadt's solo career as well. Ronstadt was unsure what to record or perform live because Kimmel composed the songs Ronstadt sung as part of the Stone Poneys. Ronstadt remembered the country music of her childhood and began experimenting with it. Her country origins would be the center of Hand Sown ... Home Grown.

Ronstadt was told that she was "too country for the rock [radio] stations and too rock for the country [radio] stations". According to Ronstadt herself, she looked "for musicians who could play songs that had come out of Nashville but with a California twist". She teamed up with producer Chip Douglas who previously worked with The Monkees and The Turtles. Douglas helped Ronstadt mix both genres together for the album project.

== Content ==
Hand Sown ... Home Grown consisted of 11 tracks. Several of the tracks were covers including "Only Daddy That'll Walk the Line" (Ronstadt's was reworked as "Only Mama That'll Walk the Line"). The song was reworked by a Nashville publishing company so Ronstadt could sing it from a woman's perspective. Two Bob Dylan covers were also included: "Baby, You've Been on My Mind" and "I'll Be Your Baby Tonight". Randy Newman's "Bet No One Ever Hurt This Bad" was also featured, which was initially on Newman's self-titled album. The album also included a version of the John D. Loudermilk country song "Break My Mind". Another cover was the country song "Silver Threads and Golden Needles". Ronstadt would later re-record the song for a separate album.

== Release, critical reception and singles ==
Professional ratings
Review scores
Source	Rating
AllMusic	3/5 stars
Rolling Stone	(favorable)

Hand Sown ... Home Grown was released by Capitol Records in March 1969. It was Ronstadt's first studio album that was credited entirely to her. It was distributed by Capitol as a vinyl LP and 8-track containing six songs on "side 1" and five songs on "side 2". Two singles were spawned from the album: "Baby You've Been on My Mind" and the "Long Way Around".

Following its release, it was reviewed by Billboard who commented that Ronstadt "has lost of none of the excitement she generated while with the Stone Poneys". Rolling Stone called it "a distinctive, if not unique, approach to country music as rock." Giving it three stars, AllMusic's Stephen Thomas Erlewine wrote, "Hand Sown…Home Grown might not quite hit the mark -- it not only has one foot in L.A. and one in Nashville, Ronstadt still has the folk affectations of the Stone Poneys -- but it's often entertaining to hear her stretch out and find her own voice, and its best moments point the way toward her future."

== Track listing ==
Hand Sown (Side 1)
No.	Title	Writer(s)	Length
1.	"Baby, You've Been on My Mind"	Bob Dylan	2:31
2.	"Silver Threads and Golden Needles"	Dick Reynolds; Jack Rhodes	2:19
3.	"Bet No One Ever Hurt This Bad"	Randy Newman	2:41
4.	"A Number and a Name"	Tom Campbell; Steve Gillette	3:03
5.	"Only Mama That'll Walk the Line"	Ivy J. Bryant	2:28
6.	"The Long Way Around"	Ken Edwards	2:17

Home Grown (Side 2)
No.	Title	Writer(s)	Length
1.	"Break My Mind"	John D. Loudermilk	2:52
2.	"I'll Be Your Baby Tonight"	Bob Dylan	3:43
3.	"It's About Time"	Chip Douglas	3:05
4.	"We Need a Whole Lot More of Jesus (And a Lot Less Rock & Roll)"	Wayne Raney	2:30
5.	"The Dolphins"	Fred Neil	4:21
Total length:			31:50

== Personnel ==
All credits are adapted from the liner notes of Hand Sown ... Home Grown.

- Chip Douglas – producer
- Ed Caraeff – photography
- Jerry Hopkins – liner notes

== Release history ==
Release history and formats for Hand Sown ... Home Grown
Region	Date	Format	Label	Ref.
North America	March 1969	LP	Capitol Records	
United Kingdom	March 1969	LP	Capitol Records	
Netherlands	1976	LP; cassette	Emidisc	
Australia	1978	Cassette	Axis Records; Capitol Records	
North America	1979	LP	Capitol Records	
Australia	1982	LP	Axis Records	
Japan	March 25, 1992	CD	Capitol Records	
North America	circa 2020	Music download; streaming	Capitol Records	
