= The Stone Poneys (album) =

Studio album by The Stone Poneys
- Released: January 30, 1967
- Recorded: October – November 1966
- Studio: Capitol (Hollywood)
- Genre: Folk rock
- Length: 27:24
- Label: Capitol
- Producer: Nik Venet

The Stone Poneys chronology
The Stone Poneys (1967)	Evergreen, Volume 2 (1967)

Reissue Cover
- 1975 cover (album renamed)

Singles from The Stone Poneys
- 1. "Sweet Summer Blue and Gold" Released: February 20, 1967

Professional ratings
Review scores
Source	Rating
Allmusic	4/5 stars

The Stone Poneys is the debut studio album by the Stone Poneys; other than the single of "So Fine" in 1965, this album marks the first official recordings by Linda Ronstadt.

== Release data ==
The album was released in the LP format on Capitol on January 30, 1967, in both monaural and stereophonic editions (catalogue numbers T 2666 and ST 2666, respectively).

In March 1975, Capitol reissued the album under the name The Stone Poneys Featuring Linda Ronstadt (catalogue number ST-11383), following the multi-platinum success Linda Ronstadt had in 1974-75 with her #1 album Heart Like a Wheel. Though the original release did not chart, this reissue reached #172 on the Billboard album chart. As a result, this heretofore virtually unknown first album by the Stone Poneys was more widely available in the 1970s and 1980s than the subsequent albums that featured the band's more familiar songs.

The front cover was essentially the same except for a circular area in the upper right hand corner titled "Early Linda!" that had the appearance of a sticker (and apparently was an adhesive sticker in some cases); while new liner notes on a redesigned back cover mentioned that this was Ronstadt's "first album ever". The song listing in the reissue highlighted Ronstadt's three solo performances on "Just a Little Bit of Rain", "Orion" and "2:10 Train"; she also sang solo on one verse of "Train and the River" that was not so identified.

As with the other two Stone Poneys albums, Capitol reissued this album on CD in 1995. In 2008 – more than 40 years after this album was released – Raven issued a 27-track "two-fer" CD simply called The Stone Poneys, featuring all tracks from this album and also the second Stone Poneys album, Evergreen, Volume 2, plus four tracks from their third album, Linda Ronstadt, Stone Poneys and Friends, Vol. III.

== Notes on the tracks ==
The songs on this album typically shade more toward the "folk" than the "rock" side of the folk-rock musical genre. Kenny Edwards recalls of these sessions: "The first record was just basically bass, drums, and us: the live representation of what we did, with the addition of a rhythm section. I don't think that we had any radio play." The themes on the songs are familiar ones from folk music: the seasons, weather, stars, trains, love. "Sweet Summer Blue and Gold" b/w "All the Beautiful Things" is the only single released from the album, with very limited success.

The majority of the songs (including both sides of the 45) were written by bandmembers Bobby Kimmel and Kenny Edwards – Edwards alone wrote "Back Home" – and all of their songs are performed in precise three-part harmony. Kimmel and Edwards had already started writing songs together before Ronstadt moved to L.A., and they were probably being written with group singing in mind. Although she has sung harmony vocals many times over her career – notably on the Trio and Trio II albums that she recorded with Dolly Parton and Emmylou Harris – these songs are unlike any other material that Ronstadt has recorded, particularly since her voice is at the same level as those of the two men.

Even on her solo performances, her vocals are rather under-stated: Ronstadt was far from self-assured at this point in her career. Of her lead vocals on "2:10 Train", Richie Unterberger has written: "Although Ronstadt was herself quite young when she sang it, she did so with reasonable conviction, though it was really the knowing world-weariness of the song itself that carried the day." Her lead on the single verse in "Train and the River" comes as a revelation, since it best shows off the gorgeous tones in Linda's voice that drove her career to great heights in years to come – perhaps because Linda did not have to carry the whole song. (This is not the same song as the one with the same name by Jimmy Giuffre).

The other song that the group sung in harmony, "Wild About My Lovin'" is in the public domain and has been recorded many times over the years; as an example, the Lovin' Spoonful included it on their 1965 debut album Do You Believe in Magic.

The Fred Neil song "Just a Little Bit of Rain" (also known as "Little Bit of Rain") – perhaps Ronstadt's strongest solo performance on this album over an entire song – was performed by Judy Henske on her 1965 album that was also essentially named for the song "Little Bit of Sunshine…Little Bit of Rain". The song was later covered by many others from the 1960s through the 2000s, among them José Feliciano, Sandy Denny and Eric Andersen.

Another of Ronstadt's solos, "2:10 Train" was written by Tom Campbell and Linda Albertano who, like the Stone Poneys themselves, were struggling singer/songwriters in the Los Angeles folk scene; the same is true of Steve Gillette, whose songs would appear on later Stone Poneys albums. Recording each other's songs was common in this time period; for instance, Gillette included "2:10 Train" on his 1967 eponymous album.

The Rising Sons – whose members included Ry Cooder and Taj Mahal – recorded "2:10 Train" in the same time period (May 1966), although it was not released until a compilation CD was brought out in the early 1990s. Also, this song is among those included on Carolyn Hester's excellent 1965 concert album, Carolyn Hester at Town Hall. More recently, Jimmy Gaudreau, a member of the progressive bluegrass band Chesapeake, included this song as the title cut on his 2008 CD 2:10 Train.

The final solo by Ronstadt, "Orion" was also written by Tom Campbell and is among dozens of songs by this name. The reference of course is to the constellation; the lyrics also address Pollux and Castor, and the Seven Sisters (the Pleiades).

== Track listing ==
Side one
No.	Title	Writer(s)	Length
1.	"Sweet Summer Blue and Gold"	Bobby Kimmel, Ken Edwards	2:18
2.	"If I Were You"	Kimmel, Edwards	1:58
3.	"Just a Little Bit of Rain"	Fred Neil	2:20
4.	"Bicycle Song"	Kimmel, Edwards	1:53
5.	"Orion"	Tom Campbell	3:20

Side two
No.	Title	Writer(s)	Length
1.	"Wild About My Lovin'"	Traditional – Adapted by Kimmel, Linda Ronstadt and Edwards	3:50
2.	"Back Home"	Edwards	2:00
3.	"Meredith (On My Mind)"	Kimmel, Edwards	2:10
4.	"Train and the River"	Kimmel, Edwards	2:18
5.	"All the Beautiful Things"	Kimmel, Edwards	1:55
6.	"2:10 Train"	Campbell, Linda Albertano	3:20

== Personnel ==
- Bobby Kimmel – vocals, guitar
- Kenny Edwards – vocals, guitar
- Linda Ronstadt – vocals, finger cymbals
- Jimmy Bond – bass, guitar
- Pete Childs – guitar
- Cyrus Faryar – bouzouki, guitar
- John T. Forsha – guitar
- Billy Mundi – drums
- Tom Wood – vocals, rhythm guitar
