= The Very Best of Linda Ronstadt =

Greatest hits album by Linda Ronstadt
- Released: September 24, 2002
- Recorded: 1967–1995
- Length: 68:15
- Label: Rhino / Elektra
- Producer: Peter Asher, John David Souther, John Boylan, Elliot F. Mazer, Nikolas Venet, Linda Ronstadt

Linda Ronstadt chronology
A Merry Little Christmas (2000)	The Very Best of Linda Ronstadt (2002)	Mi Jardin Azul: Las Canciones Favoritas (2004)

Professional ratings
Review scores
Source	Rating
AllMusic	4.5/5 stars
Rolling Stone	4/5 stars

The Very Best of Linda Ronstadt is a hits compilation by American singer/songwriter/producer Linda Ronstadt. The album was released by Rhino Records in 2002.

It peaked at #19 on Billboard's Country albums chart - where it lasted for well over a year - and crossed over to #165 on Billboard's main album chart. In 2003, a European edition was released with additional and alternate tracks.

In 2012, Rolling Stone ranked The Very Best of Linda Ronstadt at number 164 on the magazine's list of The 500 Greatest Albums of All Time.

A new Australian edition of the disc was released in 2017 and hit the ARIA Charts. It was certified Gold in Australia.

== Track listing ==
=== American version ===
No.	Title	Year	Length
1.	"When Will I Be Loved"	1974	2:09
2.	"Heat Wave"	1975	2:45
3.	"You're No Good"	1974	3:44
4.	"It's So Easy"	1977	2:28
5.	"Blue Bayou"	1977	3:56
6.	"Just One Look"	1978	3:17
7.	"Different Drum" (with The Stone Poneys)	1967	2:38
8.	"Poor Poor Pitiful Me"	1977	3:42
9.	"Tracks of My Tears"	1975	3:14
10.	"That'll Be the Day"	1976	2:34
11.	"Ooh Baby Baby"	1978	3:19
12.	"Long, Long Time"	1970	4:22
13.	"Back in the U.S.A."	1978	3:01
14.	"Love Is a Rose"	1975	2:46
15.	"Hurt So Bad"	1980	3:16
16.	"Heart Like a Wheel"	1974	3:09
17.	"Adios"	1989	3:37
18.	"Somewhere Out There" (with James Ingram)	1986	3:59
19.	"Don't Know Much" (with Aaron Neville)	1989	3:33
20.	"All My Life" (with Aaron Neville)	1989	3:30
21.	"Winter Light"	1993	3:16

=== International version ===
No.	Title	Year	Length
1.	"You're No Good"	1974	3:44
2.	"It's So Easy"	1977	2:28
3.	"Blue Bayou"	1977	3:56
4.	"Don't Know Much" (with Aaron Neville)	1989	3:33
5.	"Somewhere Out There" (with James Ingram)	1986	3:59
6.	"When Will I Be Loved"	1974	2:09
7.	"Heat Wave"	1975	2:45
8.	"Different Drum" (with The Stone Poneys)	1967	2:38
9.	"Poor Poor Pitiful Me"	1977	3:42
10.	"Tracks of My Tears"	1975	3:14
11.	"After the Gold Rush" (with Valerie Carter and Emmylou Harris)	1995	3:33
12.	"Long Long Time"	1970	4:22
13.	"Just One Look"	1978	3:17
14.	"Heart Like a Wheel"	1974	3:09
15.	"Back in the U.S.A."	1978	3:01
16.	"That'll Be the Day"	1976	2:34
17.	"Hurt So Bad"	1980	3:16
18.	"All My Life" (with Aaron Neville)	1989	3:30
19.	"Ooh Baby Baby"	1978	3:19
20.	"The Blue Train"	1995	5:04
21.	"How Do I Make You"	1980	2:25
22.	"Desperado"	1973	3:30
23.	"Winter Light"	1993	3:16

== Chart performance ==
Chart (2002–2017)	Peak position
Australian ARIA Charts	84
Scottish Albums (OCC)	41
UK Albums (OCC)	46
US Billboard 200	165
US Top Country Albums (Billboard)	19

== Certifications ==
Region	Certification	Certified units/sales
Australia (ARIA)	Gold	35,000^{^}
^{^} Shipments figures based on certification alone.

== Release history ==
Release history and formats for The Very Best of Linda Ronstadt
Region	Date	Format	Label	Ref.
North America	September 24, 2002	CD	Elektra Records; Rhino Records	
