= Bob Yellin =

- Born: Anton Robert Yellin; June 10, 1936 (age 90); New York City, United States
- Genres: Bluegrass
- Occupation: Bluegrass musician
- Instrument: Banjo
- Years active: 1958–present
- Labels: Vanguard, Elektra, Smithsonian Folkways
- Formerly of: The Greenbriar Boys

Anton Robert "Bob" Yellin (born June 10, 1936) is an American banjo player and founding member of The Greenbriar Boys bluegrass music group.

== Biography ==
Yellin was born and raised in New York City. His father was an NBC studio pianist, his mother was a concert pianist, and his brother Pete Yellin was a jazz saxophonist. After studying violin, voice, and piano as a child, Bob entered the High School of Music and Art in New York, majoring in trumpet. Following high school, he attended the City College of New York, where he majored in physics. Yellin's interest in bluegrass music in general and the banjo in particular was sparked in 1954 when he heard a recording by Lester Flatt and Earl Scruggs. After receiving an inexpensive banjo from a girlfriend, Yellin learned the basics of Scruggs style picking from Pete Seeger's book How to Play the Five-String Banjo. This was supplemented by his exposure, in the weekly folk music gatherings in Greenwich Village's Washington Square Park, to the playing of other young banjoists such as Eric Weissberg and Roger Sprung.

It was also in Washington Square that Yellin met guitarist/vocalist John Herald, and in 1958 Yellin, Herald, and Weissberg formed The Greenbriar Boys. From their inception, Yellin and Herald were joined on mandolin by baritone Ralph Rinzler, until Rinzler was replaced by Frank Wakefield on their final album, “Better Late than Never.” Yellin remained with the group through the mid-1960s. In 1969 Yellin moved with his family to Israel to live on kibbutz Ein Dor. Informed that he would have to change his given name, since there was no "Robert" in the Old Testament, he went by the name David during his 13-year residence in Israel. While in that country he performed with the bluegrass group Galilee Grass. As a member of that group, Yellin began to depart from traditional bluegrass repertoire in the direction of folk-rock artists such as The Eagles and Loggins and Messina. In 1982 Yellin returned to the United States, settling in Vermont. With fellow musician Mark Greenberg, he formed the group Bob Yellin & the Joint Chiefs of Bluegrass, which remained active into the 1990s.

== Recording and performance history ==
In 1958 Yellin and Mike Seeger performed at the Old-Time Fiddlers' Convention in Galax, Virginia, where the two shared second prize for their double-banjo rendition of "Old Joe Clark". That same year, Yellin provided what one critic termed a "deft, innovative banjo accompaniment" for Paul Clayton's Elektra album Unholy Matrimony, and in 1959 he collaborated with Mike Seeger on two tracks of the Folkways LP Mountain Music Bluegrass Style. In both 1960 and 1961, Yellin took the first place prize for banjo at the North Carolina Fiddler's Convention in Union Grove. Yellin performed as a member of the Greenbriar Boys on two tracks of the Joan Baez album Joan Baez, Vol. 2 (1961, Vanguard) and on each of the group's own albums:

- 1962: The Greenbriar Boys (Vanguard)
- 1963: Dian & the Greenbriar Boys (Elektra)
- 1964: Ragged But Right! (Vanguard)
- 1966: Better Late Than Never (Vanguard)

Yellin’s instrument, used throughout his career, is a Gibson RB-4 flat-head banjo purchased, on the advice of Roger Sprung, at a New York music store in 1958 for $125.
