= Stoney End =

Stoney End may refer to:

- "Stoney End" (song), a 1966 song by Laura Nyro; Barbra Streisand's cover version is the most famous.
- Stoney End (Barbra Streisand album)
- Stoney End (Stone Poneys album)
