= Bryndle =

American folk-rock band

Bryndle in 1996 – Edwards, Waldman, Bonoff

Bryndle was an American folk-rock band first formed in the late 1960s in Los Angeles.

The original lineup consisted of singer-songwriters Andrew Gold, Karla Bonoff, Kenny Edwards (founding member of The Stone Poneys), and Wendy Waldman. with several instrumentalists joining them for recordings or concerts over the years.

== History ==
In 1970, Bryndle recorded sessions for an album for A&M Records, with Peter Bernstein and Dennis Wood playing bass and drums, respectively. Newcomer producer Chuck Plotkin worked with the group, but their would-be debut album never materialized. Only one track, Bonoff's "Woke Up This Morning", was released as a single, briefly becoming a regional hit in northern California but failing to win a wider audience. With little to show for their considerable time and effort, the discouraged group disbanded.

Waldman, Bonoff, Gold, and Edwards each established solo careers and undertook session work in the 1970s and 1980s, and each worked closely with Linda Ronstadt in this time period. Edwards, who had been a founding member of the Stone Poneys prior to the formation of Bryndle, recorded and toured with Ronstadt for about ten years beginning in the mid-1970s. Gold was a key member of Ronstadt's backing band for several years. Waldman became a friend of Ronstadt and also toured with her for a period; they collaborated on a song, "I Want a Horse", for the 1980 Sesame Street LP In Harmony. Bonoff was one of many songwriters whom Linda Ronstadt introduced via covers on her albums, notably "Someone to Lay Down Beside Me".

In the early 1990s, Bryndle re-formed with its original quartet of Bonoff, Gold, Edwards and Waldman. In 1995, their newly recorded debut album, Bryndle, was released, and the band began a tour of the US and Japan, adding drummer Scott Babcock (who also recorded with them on the new album) and bassist Bill Bonk. In 1996, core member Gold left the band and briefly moved to the East Coast with his family. Bryndle, now essentially a trio, continued touring through 1997, with Matt Cartsonis replacing Bonk (who left to work with Aimee Mann) in the touring band.

After the tour, the four singer-songwriters took a break from the road, and all of them became busy with their solo careers. Work on a second Bryndle album proceeded slowly over the next five years with much of the songs written and recorded separately, unlike their more collaborative 1995 album. The trio focused on completing the new album in 2001, performing two house concerts during this period. Andrew Gold returned to California, helping to complete the project, and House of Silence was finally released in early 2002.

With the album released, Bryndle again became inactive as a band, and its members returned to other solo and group projects. Edwards died in August 2010, aged 64, closely followed by Gold in June 2011, aged 59.

== Discography ==
=== Bryndle (album) ===
Bryndle

Studio album by Bryndle
- Released: October 1995
- Studios: O'Henry Sound Studios (Burbank, California); Quarkbrain Studios and Trax Studios (Los Angeles, California)
- Genre: Folk rock
- Length: 63:19
- Label: MusicMasters
- Producers: Josh Leo, Bryndle

Bryndle chronology
Bryndle (1995)	House of Silence (2001)

Professional ratings
Review scores
Source	Rating
AllMusic	3/5 stars

==== Track listing ====
All songs written by Bryndle, except where noted.

No.	Title	Length
1.	"Take Me In"	4:48
2.	"I Want to Touch You"	4:04
3.	"Under the Rainbow"	5:00
4.	"Savannah"	4:12
5.	"The Lucky One"	3:29
6.	"We Walked This Road"	3:36
7.	"On the Wind"	6:05
8.	"Streets of Your Town" (Andrew Gold, Jenny Yates)	3:45
9.	"Til the Storm Goes By"	5:03
10.	"Mulberry Street"	4:20
11.	"The Wheel"	4:57
12.	"River of Stone" (Wendy Waldman, Reed Nielsen)	4:00
13.	"Daddy's Little Girl" (Karla Bonoff)	4:24
14.	"Just Can't Walk Away"	5:36

==== Personnel ====
- Bryndle (Karla Bonoff, Kenny Edwards, Andrew Gold, Wendy Waldman) – vocals, instruments
- Bob Carpenter – accordion
- Leland Sklar – bass
- Eddie Bayers – drums, percussion
- Scott Babcock – percussion
- James Ross – viola

Production

- Bryndle – producers
- Josh Leo – producer
- Andrew Gold – recording, mixing (7)
- Steve Marcantonio – recording, mixing (1–6, 8–14)
- Brett Swain – second engineer
- Michael McDonald – additional recording
- Allan Tucker – mastering at Foothill Digital (New York City, New York)
- Dawn Patrol – art direction, design
- Randee St. Nicholas – photography

=== House of Silence ===
House of Silence

Studio album by Bryndle
- Released: January 2002
- Studios: The Long House (Encino, California); The Guest House (Santa Barbara, California)
- Genre: Folk rock
- Length: 67:44
- Producer: Bad Haggard

Bryndle chronology
Bryndle (1995)	House of Silence (2002)

==== Track listing ====
No.	Title	Writer(s)	Length
1.	"Every Stone"	Kenny Edwards, Wendy Waldman	5:29
2.	"Bitter Wheel"	Karla Bonoff, Edwards, Waldman	5:55
3.	"All the Way Gone"	Bonoff, Edwards, Waldman	6:55
4.	"This Time Around"	Edwards, Waldman	4:17
5.	"As Long As It's Real"	Waldman	5:43
6.	"Crawl into the Light"	Edwards, Andrew Gold, Waldman	5:41
7.	"Like a Compass"	Bonoff, Waldman	3:41
8.	"Concrete River"	Bonoff, Edwards, Gold, Waldman	5:11
9.	"All I Need to Know"	Bonoff, Edwards, Waldman	4:40
10.	"Night Full of Rain"	Edwards, Steve Byron, Dave Byron	4:31
11.	"Heart of Fire"	Edwards, Waldman	5:59
12.	"One Heartbeat Away"	Bonoff, Edwards, Gold, Waldman	3:42
13.	"Forever Ride"	Waldman, Bill Miller, Brad Parker	6:00

==== Personnel ====
- Karla Bonoff – vocals, keyboards
- Kenny Edwards – vocals, acoustic piano, keyboards, acoustic guitars, electric guitars, slide guitar, baritone guitar, mandolin, bass
- Wendy Waldman – vocals, keyboards, organ, acoustic guitars, electric guitars, high-string guitar, mandolin, dulcimer
- Andrew Gold – vocals, keyboards, synthesizer programming, electric guitars, high-string guitar, bass, fiddle
- Martin Cartsonis – bass
- Scott Babcock – drums, percussion

Production

- Bad Haggard – producer
- Michael Boshears – assistant producer, engineer, photography
- Paul Grosso – photography
- Eric Staudenmaier – photography
- Karla Bonoff – photography
- Andrew Gold – photography
- Wendy Waldman – photography
- Nancy Terzian – graphic design
