= Different Drum (album) =

Compilation album by Linda Ronstadt
- Released: January 1974
- Recorded: 1967–1972
- Genres: Rock, country rock, folk rock
- Length: 32:28
- Label: Capitol

Linda Ronstadt chronology
Stoney End (1970)	Different Drum (1974)	Greatest Hits (1976)

Professional ratings
Review scores
Source	Rating
Allmusic	4.5/5 stars
Robert Christgau	B−

Different Drum is the first compilation album by Linda Ronstadt to be released by Capitol. Half of the tracks (those shown as having been recorded in 1967 and 1968) are taken from the second and third albums by The Stone Poneys; while the other half are from her first three solo albums.

This album was issued 10 months prior to the November 1974 release of Ronstadt's final album for Capitol, Heart Like a Wheel – which became her breakthrough #1 album – but after she had already signed with Asylum. The album reached #92 on the Billboard Top LPs & Tape chart.

== Release data ==
The album was originally released as a stereophonic LP by Capitol in 1974 (catalogue number ST-11269). In 1995, the album was reissued on CD (catalogue number 80131).

== Track listing ==
Side 1
No.	Title	Writer(s)	Year recorded	Length
1.	"Different Drum"	Mike Nesmith	1967	2:45
2.	"Rock Me on the Water"	Jackson Browne	1972	3:37
3.	"I'll Be Your Baby Tonight"	Bob Dylan	1969	3:43
4.	"Hobo" (originally called "Morning Glory")	Tim Buckley/Beckett	1968	3:00
5.	"Stoney End"	Laura Nyro	1968	3:35

Side 2
No.	Title	Writer(s)	Year recorded	Length
1.	"Long, Long Time"	Gary White	1970	4:21
2.	"Up to My Neck in High Muddy Water"	Wakefield/Herald/Yellin	1968	2:35
3.	"Some of Shelly's Blues"	Mike Nesmith	1968	3:00
4.	"In My Reply"	Livingston Taylor	1972	3:28
5.	"Will You Love Me Tomorrow"	Gerry Goffin/Carole King	1970	2:24
