= Linda Ronstadt (album) =

Studio album by Linda Ronstadt
- Released: January 17, 1972
- Venue: The Troubadour
- Studios: Muscle Shoals (Sheffield, Alabama); Quadrafonic Sound (Nashville, Tennessee); United Western (Hollywood, California)
- Genre: Country rock
- Length: 31:42
- Label: Capitol
- Producer: John Boylan

Linda Ronstadt chronology
| Silk Purse (1970) | Linda Ronstadt (1972) | Don't Cry Now (1973) |

Singles from Linda Ronstadt
- 1. "I Fall to Pieces" Released: September 1972; 2. "Rock Me on the Water" Released: April 1972

Professional ratings
Review scores
| Source | Rating |
|---|---|
| Allmusic | 4.5/5 stars |
| Christgau's Record Guide | B− |
| The Rolling Stone Album Guide | 3.5/5 stars |

Linda Ronstadt is a studio album by American singer Linda Ronstadt. It was originally released on January 17, 1972, via Capitol Records. It was the third studio album in Ronstadt's solo recording career and featured ten tracks. The album mixed original material from new singer-songwriters, along with covers of country, folk and R&B songs. Two singles were spawned from the album including the charting song "Rock Me on the Water".

== Background and recording ==
By 1972, Linda Ronstadt had recorded two studio albums as a solo artist: Hand Sown ... Home Grown (1969) and Silk Purse (1970). Both discs were inspired from the country genre. Her 1972 self-titled studio album would further dive into the genre while also embedding more of a country rock sound. The album was recorded at several studios, beginning with Quadrafonic Sound Studios in Nashville, Tennessee. However, the majority of the sessions were held at the Muscle Shoals Sound Studio in Sheffield, Alabama and United Western Recorders in Hollywood, California. Three album tracks were recorded in a live format at The Troubadour, a venue located in Hollywood as well. The album was produced by John Boylan and featured session work from Glenn Frey and Don Henley. Both musicians had joined Ronstadt's band before forming the Eagles.

== Content ==
Linda Ronstadt consisted of ten tracks. Its opening track was the Jackson Browne-penned "Rock Me on the Water". Ronstadt's version appeared a few months prior to Browne's own version. Other new recordings included "In My Reply", which was penned by James Taylor's brother. Additional songs that were new releases included "I Won't Be Hangin' Round" and "I Ain't Always Been Faithful". The album also featured covers of country standards: "Crazy Arms" (first a single for Ray Price), Johnny Cash's "I Still Miss Someone" and Patsy Cline's "I Fall to Pieces". The album also included a cover of Fontella Bass' R&B single "Rescue Me" and the folk song "Ramblin' Round". Eight of the tracks were cut in recording studios, while "Rescue Me", "I Fall to Pieces" and "Birds" were cut live at The Troubadour.

== Release, chart performance, singles and legacy ==
Linda Ronstadt was originally released on January 17, 1972, by Capitol Records and was her third solo studio album. It was originally distributed as a vinyl LP, 8-track and cassette. Both LP and cassette formats featured five songs on each side. It was Ronstadt's second solo studio album to reach the US Billboard 200 all-genre chart. Entering the Billboard 200 in February 1972, the album reached the number 163 position in March 1972. It was also her first album to reach Japan's Oricon chart, peaking at number 87. Two singles were released from the album, beginning with her cover of "I Fall to Pieces" in September 1971. In April 1972, "Rock Me on the Water" was issued as the album's second single. The latter became her third charting single in the US, peaking at number 85 on the Billboard Hot 100.

The lack of major success with this and preceding albums was one of Ronstadt's reasons for leaving the Capitol label. After signing with Asylum Records and recording her first album with them, however, Ronstadt was required to release her 1974 album, Heart Like a Wheel, on Capitol to fulfil her contract. Ironically, it would become her solo commercial breakthrough. Stephen Thomas Erlewine of AllMusic later called Linda Ronstadt "a pivotal record in her career" because it featured compositions from new singer-songwriters along with its "folk rock connections".

== Track listing ==
Side one
| No. | Title | Writer(s) | Length |
|---|---|---|---|
| 1. | "Rock Me On the Water" | Jackson Browne | 3:40 |
| 2. | "Crazy Arms" | Ralph Mooney; Chuck Seals | 3:33 |
| 3. | "I Won't Be Hangin' Round" | Eric Kaz | 3:03 |
| 4. | "I Still Miss Someone" | Johnny Cash; Roy Cash Jr. | 2:42 |
| 5. | "In My Reply" | Livingston Taylor | 3:32 |
| Total length: | | | 16:30 |

Side two
| No. | Title | Writer(s) | Length |
|---|---|---|---|
| 1. | "I Fall to Pieces" | Hank Cochran; Harlan Howard | 3:11 |
| 2. | "Ramblin' 'Round" | Lead Belly; Woody Guthrie; John A. Lomax | 3:22 |
| 3. | "Birds" | Neil Young | 3:01 |
| 4. | "I Ain't Always Been Faithful" | Eric Andersen | 2:51 |
| 5. | "Rescue Me" | Raynard Miner; Carl Smith | 2:47 |
| Total length: | | | 15:12 |

== Personnel ==
All credits are adapted from the liner notes of Linda Ronstadt.

Musical personnel

- Linda Ronstadt – lead vocals, arrangements (2, 7), tambourine (10)
- Barry Beckett – keyboards (3)
- John Boylan – guitar (1-2, 5-6, 8-9), arrangements (2, 5, 9)
- Glenn Frey – guitar (1, 6, 8–10), arrangements (1), backing vocals (9-10)
- Sneaky Pete Kleinow – pedal steel guitar (1-2, 6, 8, 10)
- Richard Bowden – electric guitar (2)
- Tippy Armstrong – guitar (3)
- Weldon Myrick – steel guitar (3)
- Bernie Leadon – guitar (4-5, 7), backing vocals (5, 7)
- Herb Pedersen – guitar (4), backing vocals (5, 7), banjo (7)
- Dean Webb – mandolin (4)
- Moon Martin – backing vocals (4), guitar (8, 10)
- Buddy Emmons – pedal steel guitar (5, 9)
- Michael Bowden – bass guitar (1-2, 6, 8–10)
- David Hood – bass guitar (3)
- Wesley Pritchett – bass guitar (4)
- Randy Meisner – bass guitar (5), backing vocals (8, 10)
- Lyle Ritz – bass guitar (7)
- Don Henley – drums (1-2, 6, 8-9, 10), backing vocals (8-10)
- Roger Hawkins – drums (3)
- Mike Botts – drums (5)
- Jimmie Fadden – harmonica (7)
- Gib Guilbeau – fiddle (2, 4, 6-7), backing vocals (4)
- JD Souther – backing vocals (2), lead and harmony vocals
- Merry Clayton – backing vocals (3)
- Dianne Davidson – backing vocals (3)
- Miss Ona – backing vocals (3)

Technical personnel

- John Boylan – producer
- Al Coury – production coordinator
- Don Blake – engineer
- Larry Hamby – engineer
- Rudy Hill – engineer
- Wally Heider – engineer
- Mike Shields – engineer, mixing, mastering
- Ray Thompson – engineer
- Dean Torrence – design
- John Hoernle – art direction
- Ed Caraeff – photography

== Charts ==
| Chart (1972) | Peak position |
|---|---|
| Japan (Oricon) | 87 |
| US Billboard 200 | 163 |

== Release history ==
Release history and formats for Linda Ronstadt
| Region | Date | Format | Label | Ref. |
|---|---|---|---|---|
| Germany | January 17, 1972 | LP | Capitol Records | |
| Japan | January 17, 1972 | LP | Capitol Records | |
| North America | January 17, 1972 | LP; cassette | Capitol Records | |
| United Kingdom | January 17, 1972 | LP | Capitol Records | |
| Netherlands | 1975 | LP | Capitol Records | |
| Japan | 1992 | CD | SuperMasters | |
| North America | 1995 | CD | Capitol Records | |
| North America | circa 2020 | Music download; streaming | Capitol Records | |
