= Mi Jardin Azul: Las Canciones Favoritas =

Compilation album by Linda Ronstadt
- Released: April 27, 2004
- Recorded: March 1976 – September 1993
- Genre: Mariachi, Latin, Mexican, Cuban
- Label: Elektra/Rhino
- Producer: Peter Asher

Linda Ronstadt chronology
The Very Best of Linda Ronstadt (2002)	Mi Jardin Azul: Las Canciones Favoritas (2004)	Hummin' to Myself (2004)

Mi Jardin Azul: Las Canciones Favoritas (English translation: "My Blue Garden: The Favorite Songs") is a compilation album by American singer Linda Ronstadt, released in 2004.

The tracks were compiled from Ronstadt's previous Spanish-language albums Canciones De Mi Padre, Mas Canciones, and Frenesi (all of which were Grammy Award winners), as well as "Lo Siento Mi Vida" from Hasten Down the Wind and "Adonde Voy" from Winter Light. This album is currently out of print in the United States.

== Reception ==
Professional ratings
Review scores
Source	Rating
Allmusic	4.5/5 stars
The Rolling Stone Album Guide	3.5/5 stars

Music critic Thom Jurek praised the compilation in his Allmusic review, writing: "Its remastered sound, personal notes, and photographs that annotate the selections make for a fine travelogue through this aspect of the singer's long career... these titles are all among the most interesting and compelling in her catalog. There is no hint of revisionism or novelty in their presentation or articulation. Musically, this set is gorgeous: full of life and passion, and brimming with stunning moments in both the vocal performances and arrangements. Wonderful."

== Track listing ==
No.	Title	Writer(s)	Length
1.	"La Charreada" (The Charreada)	Felipe Bermejo	3:46
2.	"Rogaciano el Huapanguero" (Rogatian the Huapanguero)	Valeriano Trejo	3:07
3.	"Cuando Me Querias Tu" (When You Loved Me)	Emilio Catarell Vela	3:07
4.	"Lo Siento Mi Vida" (I'm sorry my life)	Linda Ronstadt, Kenny Edwards, Gilbert Ronstadt	3:55
5.	"Mi Ranchito" (My Little Ranch)	Felipe Valdes Leal	3:34
6.	"La Cigarra" (The Cicada)	Ray Pérez, Soto	3:50
7.	"Perfidia" (Perfidy)	Alberto Dominguez, Milton Leeds	3:46
8.	"Siempre Hace Frio" (It's Always Cold)	Cuco Sanchez	3:19
9.	"La Mariquita" (The Ladybug)	Rubén Fuentes	2:59
10.	"Quiéreme Mucho" (Love Me a Lot)	Augustin Rodriguez, Gonzalo Roig	3:26
11.	"Verdad Amarga" (Bitter Truth)	Consuelo Velázquez	3:27
12.	"Por un Amor" (For a Love)	Gilberto Parra	3:02
13.	"El Sol Que Tú Eres" (Sun That You Are)	Traditional	3:03
14.	"Tata Dios" (Father God)	Trejo	4:19
15.	"Adónde Voy" (Where I Am Going)	Tish Hinojosa	3:11
16.	"Mentira Salome" (Lie Salome)	Ignacio Piñeiro	2:53
17.	"Piel Canela" (Cinnamon Skin)	Bobby Capó	3:06
18.	"Hay Unos Ojos" (There Are Some Eyes)	Fuentes	2:49
19.	"El Sueno" (The Dream)	Nicandro Castillo	3:43
20.	"El Crucifijo de Piedra" (The Crucifix of Stone)	Roberto Cantoral	3:18

== Release history ==
Release history and formats for Mi Jardin Azul: Las Canciones Favoritas
Region	Date	Format	Label	Ref.
North America	April 27, 2004	CD	Elektra Records; Rhino Records	
