= Frog Holler =

American alternative country/rock band

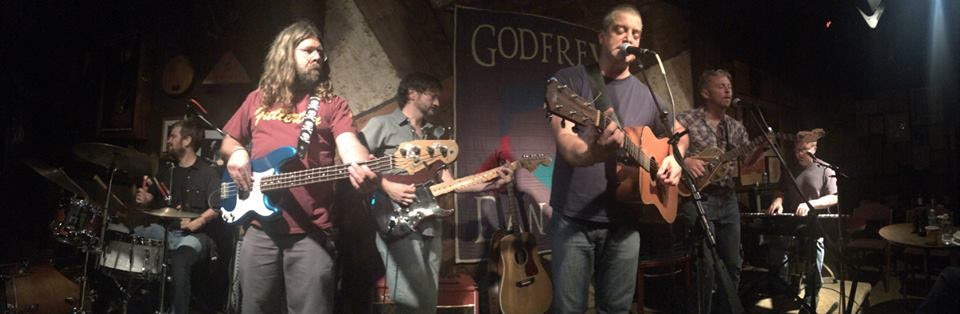

Background information
- Origin: Virginville, Pennsylvania, U.S.
- Genres: Alternative country Alternative rock Americana
- Years active: 1996–present
- Labels: ZoBird Records; Record Cellar
- Members: Daniel Bower; Cory Heller; John Kilgore; Mike Lavdanski; Josh Sceurman; Darren Schlappich
- Past members: Todd Bartolo; Will Dennis; Ted Fenstermacher; Toby Martin
- Website: FrogHoller.com

Frog Holler is an American alternative country/rock, Americana band from Berks County in southeastern Pennsylvania.

== Background ==
In 1996, Darren Schlappich started the band Chigliac Feedhorn in Shoemakersville, Pennsylvania, with local bluegrass musician Van Wagner as a duo that played original acoustic bluegrass at area open mic nights. They released the record, Dunawetter, of which seven songs were written by Schlappich. Wagner went to college and the band became an acoustic trio made up of Schlappich, Mike Lavdanski on banjo, and Will Dennis on acoustic bass.

The trio eventually became an electric six-piece band that performed original songs written by Schlappich. Some of the band members came from Kutztown University of Pennsylvania; others are from the local community. Guitarist John Kilgore, formerly from the Kutztown bluegrass jam band, the Saucony Creek Ramblers, joined, as did drummer Toby Martin. Dennis left the band and Josh Sceurman joined, playing electric bass.

== Frog Holler ==
The core band evolved into its present-day Frog Holler lineup of bandleader Schlappich on vocals and left-handed guitar, Lavdanski on banjo and vocal harmonies, Daniel Bower on drums, Kilgore on guitar, Cory Heller on keyboard, and Sceurman on bass, and often incorporate mandolin and steel guitar in their music.

Because many members of the band are of Pennsylvania Dutch ancestry, they are sometimes affectionately referred to as Pennsylvania Dutch rock.

Frog Holler self-released its debut album, Couldn't Get Along. The record is dedicated to "The three Jays," possibly Jay Farrar, Jay Bennett, and J Mascis. The band followed their debut with three releases on the local label. Record Cellar. As they built up a following regionally, the band began touring extensively, playing gigs from Boston to the Carolinas. Frog Holler released three records through the small independent label from Philadelphia, Record Cellar, run by Neil Drucker. Improved visibility and the release of their positively reviewed fourth record, Railings, led to the band touring the industrial midwest as well as the Netherlands. Frog Holler has been mostly regionally focused, while maintaining annual residencies at the now defunct New York City Rodeo Bar as well as an upstate New York music festival.

Many of their songs reflect the small rural community of their origins, with the song "Pennsylvania" off their third record, Idiots, an ode to tension between modern life and the more conservative, set-in-its-way, German-American lifestyle of past generations. Idiots charted 34 on Americana radio charts and was well-reviewed. Throughout Frog Holler's music there are local references to landmarks and evocative descriptions of rural life. Their fourth record, Railings, was recorded at Edan Cohen's Soundgun Studios in Philadelphia.

In 2016, seven years after their prior record, Frog Holler celebrated their 20-year anniversary as a band, releasing their seventh full-length record called Souvenir. The record was recorded between March 2015 and February 2016 with Bruce Siekmann, engineer and owner of Amoeba Studio in Fleetwood, Pennsylvania.

== Critical response ==
Rachel Maddow saw Frog Holler open for Marah and became an avid fan, which led to her inviting Schlappich to perform on her Air America Radio show. Writer Meredith Ochs cites Frog Holler's live performances and high level of musicianship, as does Fred Mills, describing them as a "killer live band." Andy Turner in No Depression calls Schlappich a "real-deal storyteller." Peter Bothum from the York Daily Record says the music comes from a rare place of honesty. Doug Wallen from Philadelphia Weekly liked their genuine, "down-home sweetness of their loose, melodic strain of alt-country." Geoffrey Himes, writing in The Washington Post, described Frog Holler as a secret treasure.

== Ataloft ==
In 2012, Schlappich, Lavdanski, and Bruce Siekmann formed the pop-rock band Ataloft as a side project. The band released a self-titled album called Ataloft in 2014.

== Dem Hills ==
In May 2017, Schlappich released Maybe Life Is Sweet in a new band collaboration project with Bruce Siekmann (Ameoba Audio) on guitar, Schlappich and Mike Lavdanski on vocals, Josh Kanusky on drums, Nick Franclik on bass and Cory Heller on keyboards. Siekmann and Schlappich wrote the songs and the band includes members of Frog Holler, Ataloft, and the David Bromberg Band.

== Discography ==
Chigliac Feedhorn

- 1996: Dunawetter (self-released)

Frog Holler

- 1998: Couldn't Get Along (ZoBird Records)
- 1999: Adams Hotel Road (Record Cellar Productions)
- 2001: Idiots (Record Cellar Productions)
- 2003: Railings (Record Cellar Productions)
- 2004: The High Highs and the Low Lows (EP) (ZoBird Records)
- 2006: Haywire (ZoBird Records)
- 2009: Believe It or Not (ZoBird Records)
- 2016: Souvenir (ZoBird Records)

Ataloft

- 2014: Ataloft (ZoBird Records)

Dem Hills

- 2017: Maybe Life Is Sweet (ZoBird Records)

Collaborations / contributions

- 1996: Buildin' the Rails Life of a Gandy Dancer at Railroad Museum of Pennsylvania (video). Music by Darren Schlappich, Van Wagner, Rich Pawling
- 2001: Papa Nez: A Loose Salute To The Work Of Michael Nesmith (Dren Records) – "Different Drum"
- 2002: Chooglin' A Tribute to the Songs of John Fogerty (Dren Records) – "Have You Ever Seen the Rain?"
