= Hummin' to Myself (Linda Ronstadt album) =

Studio album by Linda Ronstadt
- Released: November 9, 2004
- Studios: Clubhouse Recording Studios (Rhinebeck, New York); Capitol Studios (Hollywood, California); Mooselosge (Calabasas, California); Skywalker Sound (Marin County, California); Jim Brady Recording Studios (Tucson, Arizona); Oxford Sound (Nashville, Tennessee); Georkel Recording (Williamson County, Tennessee)
- Genre: Jazz
- Length: 37:12
- Label: Verve/Universal
- Producers: George Massenburg; John Boylan

Linda Ronstadt chronology
Mi Jardin Azul: Las Canciones Favoritas (2004)	Hummin' to Myself (2004)	Adieu False Heart (2006)

Professional ratings
Review scores
Source	Rating
Allmusic	3/5 stars
Billboard	(favorable)
Entertainment Weekly	B+
Jazz Times	(favorable)

Hummin’ to Myself is the twenty-fourth and final studio album by American singer Linda Ronstadt. The album debuted at #3 on the Billboard Top Jazz Albums chart where it remained for six months. It peaked at #166 on the main Billboard album chart. It was her last solo album before her retirement in 2011, though she would record one more collaborative album in 2006 titled Adieu False Heart.

== History ==
Hummin' to Myself represents a return by Ronstadt to the classic jazz standards world she explored in a series of 1980s albums with Nelson Riddle, only this time with a band, not an orchestra, and in an overtly jazz manner. According to an interview with Ronstadt, the songs on the album were among those she wanted to record with Riddle, but was unable to because of his death.

Ronstadt sings songs by Frank Loesser (“Never Will I Marry” and “I’ve Never Been in Love Before”) and Cole Porter (“Get out of Town,” “Miss Otis Regrets"), and “I Fall in Love Too Easily”.

Hummin’ to Myself received critical acclaim for its devotion to authenticity. It features musicians Alan Broadbent, Christian McBride, David “Fathead” Newman, Lewis Nash, Peter Erskine and Roy Hargrove.

== Track listing ==
No.	Title	Writer(s)	Length
1.	"Tell Him I Said Hello"	Jack J. Canning, Bill Hegner	4:33
2.	"Never Will I Marry"	Frank Loesser	2:22
3.	"Cry Me a River"	Arthur Hamilton	4:25
4.	"Hummin' to Myself"	Sammy Fain, Herbert Magidson, Monty Siegel	2:45
5.	"Miss Otis Regrets"	Cole Porter	3:11
6.	"I Fall in Love Too Easily"	Sammy Cahn, Jule Styne	3:36
7.	"Blue Prelude"	Joe Bishop, Gordon Jenkins	3:01
8.	"Day Dream"	Duke Ellington, John Latouche, Billy Strayhorn	4:28
9.	"I've Never Been in Love Before"	Frank Loesser	3:25
10.	"Get Out of Town"	Cole Porter	2:49
11.	"I'll Be Seeing You"	Sammy Fain, Irving Kahal	2:37
Total length:			37:12

== Personnel ==
Musicians

- Linda Ronstadt – vocals, arrangements (3)
- Alan Broadbent – acoustic piano (1–9, 11), arrangements (1, 3–9, 11)
- Warren Bernhardt – acoustic piano (10)
- Bob Mann – guitars (1–4, 6–7, 10)
- Larry Koonse – guitars (8–9)
- Christian McBride – bass (1–7, 10)
- Trey Henry – bass (8, 9)
- Lewis Nash – drums (1–4, 6–7, 10)
- Peter Erskine – drums (8–9)
- Jim Horn – tenor saxophone (1, 6, 10)
- David "Fathead" Newman – tenor saxophone (2, 10)
- Bob Sheppard – tenor saxophone (8)
- Dan Block – clarinet (4)
- Mike Haynes – flugelhorn (1, 10)
- Roy Hargrove – flugelhorn solo (6)
- Steven Bernstein – trumpet (2)
- Jon-Erik Kellso – trumpet (4)
- Bob Summers – trumpet (8)
- John Catchings – cello (1, 3)
- Roberta Cooper – cello (5)
- Alexander Zhiroff – cello (11)
- Eugene Drucker – violin (5)
- Armen Anassian – violin (11)

Production

- John Boylan – producer
- George Massenburg – producer, recording, mastering, mixing
- Al Schmitt – additional engineer
- Steve Bishir – assistant engineer
- Jim Brady – assistant engineer
- Mark DeBuck – assistant engineer
- Steve Genewick – assistant engineer
- Hank Linderman – assistant engineer
- Chris Powers – assistant engineer
- Sean Price – assistant engineer
- Dann Thompson – assistant engineer
- André Zweers – assistant engineer
- Doug Sax – mastering
- Robert Hadley – mastering
- The Mastering Lab (Hollywood, California)
- Theodora Kuslan – release coordinator
- Kelly Pratt – release coordinator
- Isabelle Wong – graphic design
- Hollis King – art direction
- Rocky Schenck – photography
- Milton Buras – hair stylist
- J. Roy Helland – make-up

== Charts ==
Chart performance for Hummin' to Myself
Chart (2004)	Peak position
US Top Jazz Albums (Billboard)	3
US Billboard 200	166

== Release history ==
Release history and formats for Hummin' to Myself
Region	Date	Format	Label	Ref.
North America	November 9, 2004	Compact disc	Verve Records	
