= Joan Baez, Vol. 2 =

Studio album by Joan Baez
- Released: September 1961
- Recorded: 1961
- Studio: Vanguard, New York City
- Genre: Folk
- Length: 44:15
- Label: Vanguard VSD-2097
- Producer: Maynard Solomon

Joan Baez chronology
Joan Baez (1960)	Joan Baez, Vol. 2 (1961)	Joan Baez in Concert (1962)

Singles from Joan Baez, Vol. 2
- 1. "Banks of the Ohio / Old Blue" Released: 1961; 2. "Lonesome Road / Pal of Mine" Released: 1962

Joan Baez, Vol. 2 is the second studio album by Joan Baez. Released in 1961, the album, like her self-titled 1960 debut album, featured mostly traditional songs. The bluegrass band the Greenbriar Boys provided backup on two songs. Joan Baez, Vol. 2 peaked at No. 13 on the Billboard album chart and was nominated for a Grammy for "Best Contemporary Folk Performance".

The Vanguard reissue contains three unreleased tracks, "I Once Loved a Boy", "Poor Boy" and "Longest Train I Ever Saw".

== Reception ==
Professional ratings
Review scores
Source	Rating
AllMusic	4/5 stars

In his AllMusic review, music critic Matt Fink wrote of the album:

The material chosen is truly exceptional... Without a doubt, Baez's version of 'Pal of Mine' is every bit as vibrant as when the Carters recorded it, though here given a more bluegrass sound by the banjo and backup vocal accompaniment of the Greenbriar Boys. Baez is a true master of her craft, and though she hasn't always made the best choices for material, the 14 interpretations here are as timeless as the songs themselves... this is an album that all fans of traditional folk music should seek out.

== Track listing ==
All songs traditional, except where noted.

Side one
No.	Title	Writer(s)	Length
1.	"Wagoner's Lad"	Traditional; arranged by anonymous	2:14
2.	"The Trees They Do Grow High"	Traditional; arranged by anonymous	2:59
3.	"Lily of the West"		3:21
4.	"Silkie" (Child no. 113)		4:01
5.	"Engine 143"		3:32
6.	"Once I Knew a Pretty Girl"		2:56
7.	"Lonesome Road"		2:23

Side two
No.	Title	Writer(s)	Length
8.	"Banks of the Ohio"		3:09
9.	"Pal of Mine"		2:50
10.	"Barbara Allen" (Child no. 84)		4:17
11.	"The Cherry Tree Carol" (Child no. 54)		3:30
12.	"Old Blue"		2:36
13.	"Railroad Boy"		2:31
14.	"Plaisir d'Amour" ("The Joys of Love")	Jean-Paul-Égide Martini alias Martini il Tedesco	3:11
Total length:			44:15

2001 reissue bonus tracks
No.	Title	Length
15.	"I Once Loved a Boy"	2:39
16.	"Poor Boy"	2:55
17.	"Longest Train I Ever Saw"	3:15

== Personnel ==
- Joan Baez – vocals, guitar
- The Greenbriar Boys – vocals, accompaniment (tracks B1-B2)

== Certifications ==
Certifications for Joan Baez, Vol. 2
Region	Certification	Certified units/sales
United States (RIAA)	Gold	500,000^{^}
^{^} Shipments figures based on certification alone.

== Charts ==
Chart (1961)	Peak position
US Billboard Top Albums	13
