= John Braheny =

American author and singer-songwriter

- Born: December 9, 1938; Iowa, United States
- Died: January 19, 2013 (aged 74); Los Angeles, California, United States
- Occupations: Writer, singer-songwriter, journalist, teacher and consultant
- Writing career
- Genre: Folk-Rock
- Website: www.johnbraheny.com

John Barry Braheny (December 9, 1938 – January 19, 2013) was an American author and singer-songwriter. He released a solo album in 1968, Some Kind of Change, on the Pete label. He was born in 1938 in Iowa. He also wrote songs for others, including "December Dream" in 1967, which was recorded by The Stone Poneys who included lead vocalist Linda Ronstadt. It was released on the band's Evergreen - Volume Two album that year.

He died on January 19, 2013, aged 74.

== Discography ==
- 1968 Some Kind of Change (Pete Label)

== Bibliography ==
- 2006 The Craft and Business of Songwriting: A Practical Guide to Creating and Marketing Artistically and Commercially Successful Songs (Writers Digest Books) ) now in its 3rd Edition
- 1986 Songwriter's Handbook (American Song Festival)
- 1982 The American Song Festival Songwriter's Handbook (Los Angeles Songwriters Showcase)
