= Bobby Kimmel =

American musician (born 1940)

- Bobby Kimmel

Background information
- Born: September 1, 1940 (age 86); United States
- Genres: Folk rock
- Occupations: Singer, songwriter, guitarist
- Instruments: Guitar, double bass
- Years active: 1962 – present
- Labels: Capitol Records, Takoma Records, GemsTone (distributed by mondayMEDIA)

Bobby Kimmel (born September 1, 1940) is an American musician and songwriter who currently performs with the acoustic folk group I Hear Voices. He has been recording and performing in concert for over 50 years and was a founding member of the Stone Poneys, along with Linda Ronstadt and Kenny Edwards.

Kimmel moved to Tucson as a child for his asthmatic condition. His father was a studio musician in New York City, and become the principal double bass player in the Tucson Symphony Orchestra. He also owned and operated a retail music shop near the university.

Kimmel's early musical influence was jazz, especially "West Coast" jazz. He also listened to the "harder" East Coast jazz. His passion for jazz continued all throughout his high school years, and it was not until he discovered the guitar (at age 17) that his musical direction changed.

He became aware of the folk and blues musicians such as Doc Watson, Lightnin Hopkins, Merle Travis, and Mississippi John Hurt, as well as contemporaries like Dick Rosmini, Steve Mann and Ry Cooder. Phonorecords from his father's music store at this time contributed invaluably to his musical education.

At that point, Kimmel fully turned his attention toward folk music. He began playing both bass and guitar in the folk music clubs around Tucson in the early 1960s. He started performing with his friend Linda Ronstadt. During that period he played bass in a folk group with Linda and her older brother and sister Peter and Suzie.

== Los Angeles years ==
In 1963, Kimmel left Tucson for Los Angeles to further his music career. Quickly he called Linda to join him there.

Linda agreed, and together they formed The Stone Poneys with the guitarist Kenny Edwards. After a few months of rehearsal (including in the local laundromat which had great acoustics), the trio played an open mike gig at The Troubador in West Los Angeles. That one performance resulted in a multi-album contract with Capitol Records.

== The Stone Poneys ==
The Stone Poneys recorded three albums for Capitol in the mid-1960s and had a major hit in 1967 with "Different Drum", written in 1964 by soon-to-be Monkees member Michael Nesmith. Different Drum peaked at #12 on the Cashbox Top 100 chart on February 12, 1968. The first two Stone Poney albums mostly featured Kimmel's original songs.

The band toured nationally and played popular music TV shows including The Tonight Show Starring Johnny Carson. They toured briefly as the opening act for The Doors when "Light My Fire" was a huge hit and Jim Morrison was a pop music phenom.

About the time "Different Drum" became a hit, Kenny Edwards quit The Stone Poneys. That was the beginning of the end, Ronstadt and Kimmel played one more tour as The Stone Poneys with pick-up musicians, and the group disbanded at the end of the tour.

== McCabe's Guitar Shop ==
After the Stone Poneys broke up, Kimmel created and developed the concert series at McCabe's Guitar Shop in Santa Monica, California. It became one of the premier acoustic music venues in the country. By the time he left 7 years later, McCabe's was a notable concert venue attracting artists such as Jackson Browne, Odetta, Emmylou Harris, Bill Monroe, Jennifer Warnes, Doc & Merle Watson, The New Grass Revival, David Grisman, Tom Waits, Chet Atkins and Shep Cooke had all headlined there - and many others.

In the mid-1970s, Kimmel also teamed up with Shep Cooke (also from Tucson and who was on the final Stone Poneys tour), Andrew Gold, and LA musician Kit Alderson. They formed The Floating House Band, an acoustic singing trio. They recorded an album for Takoma Records, which was owned by folk guitarist John Fahey.

== With Doc & Merle Watson ==
In the late 1970s, Kimmel went out on the road playing upright bass with Doc & Merle Watson. They played the New Orleans Jazz & Heritage Festival.

== Japan ==
Kimmel's last music business endeavor in Los Angeles was arranging tours in Japan by American folk artists. Working in tandem with his Japanese partner Hiroshi Asada, they booked tours for three years, including tours by Jesse Colin Young, LA session guitarist Larry Carlton, The New Grass Revival and a bluegrass all-star band featuring David Grisman, Tony Rice, Richard Greene, Bill Keith, Peter Rowan and Todd Phillips. Kimmel went on several of these tours as road manager.

== Back In Tucson - 4 Corners ==
He moved back to Tucson in 2001 and connected with his friend Jo Wilkinson, a powerful lead singer and songwriter from Los Angeles who also moved there. Since Jo and Bobby had played together at parties there, they got the idea of forming an acoustic singing band here. They went to the 2002 Tucson Folk Festival together, and on the second day they heard Stefan George and Lavinia White. Kimmel immediately approached Stefan and Lavinia and proposed that the four of them get together to play music. Stefan and Lavinia were cautious at first, but after a while and a number of casual living room sessions at Kimmel's house, they warmed to the idea and finally 4 Corners was formed. At the beginning of 2003, the quartet began rehearsing seriously.

4 Corners sang together for 3 1/2 years and released two CDs before Wilkinson left the group in the summer of 2006.

== BK Special ==
After Wilkinson left 4 Corners, Kimmel, Heorge and White decided to try to go on as a trio.

Kimmel written a group of new songs full of possibilities for rich harmonies, and much room for George to play. Along with a crop of George's latest songs to work with, the band quickly developed a new repertoire and a new harmony sound.

== BK Special album with Linda Ronstadt ==
Although BK Special only formed in the summer of 2006, by the end of that year, they were already talking about recording their first album. They followed through, and in March 2007 the trio went into Duncan Stitt's A Writer's Room studio to begin recording. They recorded 12 songs live in the studio over the next couple of weeks.

Somewhere toward the end of the mixing process, and before George's return, Kimmel got a call from Linda Ronstadt who was in Tucson and wanted to visit. They went out to dinner, and during the evening Kimmel was raving about how excited he was with the way the album was turning out. Ronstadt was immediately impressed with the sound Stitt had achieved on the all-acoustic CD, and really liked the trio's three-part vocals. One of the songs Kimmel played was his own "Into The Arms of Love", and Ronstadt started singing a harmony part under her breath. Kimmel asked her to sing that part on the album.

By the time George came back from Germany, the album was nearly mixed - and Ronstadt had agreed to sing on it.

== Second BK Special album ==
In 2010, BK Special released their second album, Hope Spring, containing eight original songs by Kimmel. Both BK Special CDs remain in print and available.

== I Hear Voices! ==
At the beginning of 2012, Kimmel retired BK Special after almost ten years together to focus on his dream of forming a quartet with a purely vocal concept and almost no instrumental presence. He joined with Tucson musicians Kathy Harris, Bobby Ronstadt and Suzy Ronstadt to form I Hear Voices! and realize that dream.

I Hear Voices! released their self-titled CD in mid-2013 during their appearance at the Tucson Folk Festival where they had a featured spot. In July 2013 the group traveled to Santa Monica, to play McCabe's Guitar Shop, the club Kimmel opened in 1969, and had become one of the premier acoustic venues in the country.

== Discography ==
Numbers in parentheses indicate the date of release, and also the highest position on Billboard charts

=== Singles ===
- The Stone Poneys - "Sweet Summer Blue and Gold" b/w "All the Beautiful Things" (rel. 1/67) – #45-1024 Capitol Records
- The Stone Poneys - "One for One" b/w "Evergreen" (rel. 6/67) – #5910; Capitol Records
- The Stone Poneys - "Different Drum" b/w "I've Got to Know" (rel. 9/67) – #2004; (#13) Capitol Records
- The Stone Poneys - "Up to My Neck in High Muddy Water" b/w "Carnival Bear" (rel. 3/68) – #2110; (#93) Capitol Records
- The Stone Poneys - "Some of Shelly's Blues" b/w "Hobo" (rel. 5/68) – #2195; Capitol Records

=== Albums ===
- The Stone Poneys - The Stone Poneys (album) – (rel. 1/67) Capitol Records
- The Stone Poneys - Evergreen, Volume 2 – (rel. 6/67) (#100) Capitol Records
- The Stone Poneys - Linda Ronstadt, Stone Poneys and Friends, Vol. III – (rel. 4/68) Capitol Records
- The Stone Poneys - The Stone Poneys Featuring Linda Ronstadt – (rel. 3/75, reissue of first album) (#172) Capitol Records
- The Floating House Band - The Floating House Band - (rel. 1972) Takoma Records
- 4 Corners - 4 Corners
- 4 Corners - 4 Corners Live at McCabes
- BK Special - BK Special (rel. 2007)
- BK Special - Hope Springs (rel. 2010)
- I Hear Voices! - I Hear Voices! (rel. 2013)
- I Hear Voices! - I Hear Voices with Strings (rel. 2015)

=== Compilation albums ===
- The Stone Poneys - Stoney End (Linda Ronstadt album) – (rel. 1970) Capitol Records
- The Stone Poneys - The Stone Poneys (two-fer CD) – (rel. 2008) Capitol Records
