= Roger Sprung =

American banjo player and teacher (1930–2023)

- Born: August 29, 1930; New York, New York, U.S.
- Died: July 22, 2023 (aged 92) Newtown, Connecticut, U.S.
- Genres: Bluegrass
- Occupations: Musician, banjoist
- Instruments: Banjo
- Years active: 1947–2023

Roger Sprung (August 29, 1930 – July 22, 2023) was an American banjo player and teacher best known for introducing authentic bluegrass banjo picking styles to the folk music community in the north and for the eclectic manner in which he adapted bluegrass banjo techniques to music of other genres. His 1963 album Progressive Bluegrass may have been the first use of that title, later applied to a subgenre of bluegrass music by him and others. In 2020, he was inducted into the American Banjo Museum Hall of Fame under the Instruction & Education category.

== Biography ==
=== Beginnings ===
Roger Sprung began playing music at the age of seven when an interest in the piano was sparked by his nanny who taught him to play a tune. Later, around age ten, Sprung took formal piano lessons for about a year, but by then he had already taught himself to play by ear. He was introduced to folk music as a teenager in 1947 when his older brother took him to hear musicians perform in New York's Washington Square. After taking up the guitar Sprung next up the banjo, teaching himself to play by ear with the aid of 78 rpm records by Earl Scruggs. He was also influenced by Pete Seeger and Paul Cadwell, as well as Tom Paley, from whom he took several banjo lessons. In 1950, Sprung made the first of many trips to bluegrass country, accompanying mandolinist Harry West to Asheville, North Carolina. There he had his first exposure to such traditional country musicians as Bascom Lamar Lunsford and Samantha Bumgarner. These trips became a regular part of Sprung's musical life, and he passed along the styles and techniques he absorbed during them to his fellow musicians in the north. As bluegrass historian and performer Ralph Lee Smith wrote, "Banjo player Roger Sprung almost single-handedly introduced Southern bluegrass music to New York through his playing in Washington Square."

In 1953 Sprung joined Erik Darling and Bob Carey to form the Folksay Trio. The group recorded four tracks on an anthology album that also included performances by Lead Belly and Woody Guthrie. One of the trio's songs, "Tom Dooley," would later be popularized by The Kingston Trio and become one of the best-selling folk song recordings of all time. (Note: It has been suggested that the Folksay Trio's recording of "Tom Dooley" was in fact the inspiration for the Kingston Trio's later recording. The notes accompanying the CD collection, "The Kingston Trio: The Guard Years" make this claim, and the New York Times's obituary for Erik Darling states that the Folksay Trio version "strongly influenced The Kingston Trio when that group recorded the song." (William Grimes, "Erik Darling Dies at 74; Musician in the Weavers", The New York Times, August 7, 2008, accessed October 26, 2009.) Alternate theories about The Kingston Trio's possible sources for the song have been put forth as well. For a thorough discussion of the subject, see Peter J. Curry, "Tom Dooley": The Ballad That Started The Folk Boom.) Carey and Darling later joined Alan Arkin, who would go on to achieve fame as an actor, to form the highly successful folk group The Tarriers.

Sprung was also a familiar face in the mid-1950s Washington Square gatherings of folk musicians in Greenwich Village. When the first edition of The Village Voice featured a page one story about the music scene, Sprung was one of the players interviewed by John Wilcock for the article, and was featured in the lead sentence: "Roger Sprung, 25, runs a TV repair shop in Lake Mohegan, New York, but every week end during the summer he comes to the Village to play and sing folk music in Washington Square..." "Music Makers Quit the Square, But Only for the Wintertime"

In 1957, Sprung formed another group, The Shanty Boys, with Lionel Kilberg and Mike Cohen.

=== Career ===
Over the next six decades, Sprung performed with such legendary folk musicians as Jean Ritchie and Doc Watson as well as with more recent country music artists Willie Nelson, Wynonna Judd, and Tanya Tucker. He recorded with Guy Lombardo and the Royal Canadians and toured with popular jazz singer Kay Starr. His television appearances include the Jimmy Dean, Garry Moore, and Dean Martin Shows, and he performed at both the Lincoln Center and Carnegie Hall. For the quarter century before his death Sprung performed with guitarist Hal Wylie, Manny Krevat, Drew Smith, and various other musicians as "Roger Sprung, Hal Wylie and the Progressive Bluegrassers." Sprung appeared frequently at folk festivals and musical conventions, including the Philadelphia Folk Festival, at which he performed for 30 consecutive years, and the Union Grove Fiddler's Convention in North Carolina, where in 1970 he was winner of the banjo competition.

In the 1970s, he was a frequent visitor to the annual New England Fiddle Contest in Hartford, and a photo of fiddlers jamming with him was a frequently reprinted item in the contest's press kit and on the home page of the revived contest in 1999.

In addition to his performing and recording career, Sprung sold and repaired banjos and taught banjo and other instruments since 1950. Notable among his former students were Erik Darling and John Stewart, who became replacement members of The Weavers and The Kingston Trio, respectively. (Note: Sprung's influence on other musicians extends beyond his teaching. He has been cited, for instance, as an influence on Bela Fleck, a banjo player whose eclectic repertoire resembles that of Sprung. See for example the "Roger Sprung" entry at North American Urban Folk Music 1940–1960 – Celebration 2009, Eugene Chadbourne, Roger Sprung Biography, and Frank Beacham's Journal, "Folkies Gather in New York's Washington Square Park for Reunion".)

=== Repertoire ===
Sprung's recordings and concert appearances embrace a variety of musical genres. In addition to traditional bluegrass and ragtime music, his repertoire includes arrangements of Elizabethan and classical pieces, Broadway show tunes, jazz and big band standards, and holiday songs. Composers whose works he arranged for banjo include Mozart, Weill, Sousa, Ernesto Lecuona, and Stephen Foster. Among the selections he recorded are ones as musically diverse as "Hava Nagila", "Hello, Dolly," "Turkey in the Straw," "Jingle Bells," "Puff, the Magic Dragon," "The World Is Waiting for the Sunrise," and "Mrs. Brown, You've Got a Lovely Daughter."

Sprung's instrument was a 1927 Gibson which he reconstructed himself using parts from two other Gibson banjos.

=== Death ===
Roger Sprung died in Newtown, Connecticut on July 22, 2023, at the age of 92.

== Discography ==
- American Folksay: Ballads and Dances, Vol. 2, The Folksay Trio (1953) (Stinson)
- Off-Beat Folk Songs, The Shanty Boys (1958) (Elektra)
- Progressive bluegrass. Vol. 1, Roger Sprung & his Progressive Bluegrassers (1963) (Folkways Records)
- Progressive ragtime bluegrass 2 and other instrumentals, Roger Sprung & his Bluegrass All-Stars (1964) (Folkways Records)
- Progressive bluegrass. Vol. 3, Five string banjo specialties, Roger Sprung & his Progressive Bluegrassers (1965) (Folkways Records)
- Grassy licks, Roger Sprung & his Progressive Bluegrassers (1966) (Verve/Folkways)
- Roger Sprung & his Progressive Bluegrassers, Roger Sprung & his Progressive Bluegrassers (1967) (Showcase)
- Bluegrass blast : a mixed bag of ol' timey music, Roger Sprung & Hal Wylie & the Progressive Bluegrassers (1974) (Folkways Records)
- Bluegrass Gold, Hal Wylie & Roger Sprung & the Progressive Bluegrassers (1978) (Showcase)
- Bluegrass Gold, Vol. 2, Roger Sprung & the Progressive Bluegrassers (Showcase)
- New and Original Sound of Irish-Grass (1982) (Showcase)
- Pickin' on the mountain, Roger & Joan Sprung (Showcase)
- Roger & Joan, Roger & Joan Sprung (Showcase)
