= Kenny Edwards =

American singer, songwriter, musician (1946–2010)

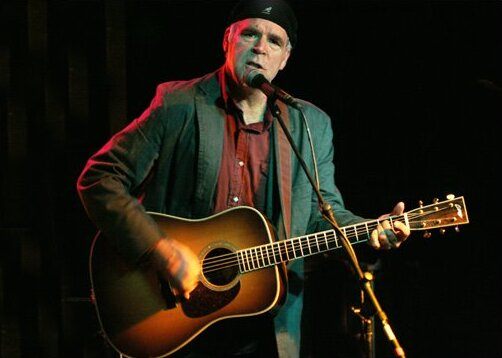
- Edwards performing in Santa Barbara, 2009

Background information
- Born: Kenneth Michael Edwards; February 10, 1946
- Died: August 18, 2010 (aged 64)
- Genres: Folk; country; alternative country
- Occupations: Singer; songwriter; musician; record producer
- Instruments: Vocals; guitar; bass; mandolin; harmonica; cello
- Years active: 1964–2010

Kenneth Michael Edwards (February 10, 1946 – August 18, 2010) was an American singer, songwriter, bassist, guitarist, mandolinist, and session musician. He was a founding member of the Stone Poneys and Bryndle and a long-time collaborator with Linda Ronstadt and Karla Bonoff.

== Biography ==
Having been a founding member of The Stone Poneys in 1964 with Linda Ronstadt, Bobby Kimmel, and Shep Cooke, Edwards next turned his musical attention to the band Bryndle (with Karla Bonoff, Andrew Gold and Wendy Waldman) five years later. In 1970, Bryndle recorded their debut album for A&M Records. The album went through many revisions before being submitted to the record company, but it was never released.

Edwards subsequently returned to work with Linda Ronstadt on her ground-breaking album, Heart Like A Wheel (1974). He then spent many years with Ronstadt as a sideman, singer, arranger and touring band member. Edwards also became a noted producer and was responsible for masterminding former Bryndle colleague Bonoff's solo albums. His session work has seen Edwards work either live or in the studio with acts such as Emmylou Harris, Stevie Nicks, JD Souther, Don Henley, Brian Wilson, Warren Zevon, Art Garfunkel, Vince Gill, Mac McAnally, David Lee Murphy, Jennifer Warnes, Danny Kortchmar, Lowell George, as well as a younger generation of artists including Glen Phillips and Natalie D-Napoleon.

Edwards released his first, self-titled solo album in 2002. In his later years, he performed as a singer-songwriter, often with Nina Gerber accompanying, and completed the recording and release of a second solo album in 2009.

== Stone Poneys ==
In 1964, Linda Ronstadt moved to Los Angeles to form a band with her old Tucson friend Bobby Kimmel, who had already begun co-writing several folk-rock songs with guitarist-songwriter Edwards. As The Stone Poneys, the band was signed by the late Nik Venet to Capitol and released three albums in a 15-month period in 1967–68: The Stone Poneys; Evergreen, Volume 2; and Linda Ronstadt, Stone Poneys and Friends, Vol. III. The band is best known for their hit single "Different Drum" (written by Michael Nesmith prior to his joining the Monkees), which reached No. 13 on the Billboard Hot 100 and No. 12 in Cash Box. (It hit number 1 in Los Angeles and reached number 6 in the Detroit marketplace.) The song remains one of Linda Ronstadt's most popular recordings. While Stone Poneys broke up before the release of their third album, Edwards recorded and toured with Ronstadt from the mid-1970s to the early 1990s, mainly as a bassist.

== Bryndle ==
In 1970, Bryndle recorded their debut album for A&M Records with Chuck Plotkin helming one of his first major production undertakings. The album went through several revisions, but was never released. A single, "Woke Up This Morning", written by Karla Bonoff and produced by Lou Adler, did arise from those sessions and met with modest success. This was to be the only release from the original incarnation of Bryndle as the band subsequently disbanded. Waldman, Bonoff, Andrew Gold and Edwards established solo careers and session work before reforming in the early 1990s. In 1995, a newly recorded debut was released and the band began a tour of America and Japan. In 1996, Gold departed the band, while Bryndle continued touring through 1997.

After a break of more than five years, the band reformed for two house concert performances in 2002. Those two performances were edited down to a single CD released the next year. The band was mostly inactive after their 2002 performances.

== Solo ==
From early 2000 until his death, Edwards predominantly performed as a solo singer-songwriter. During that time, he recorded and released his first self-titled solo album (2002) and a second titled Resurrection Road (2009). He undertook showcase performances at roots-based music festivals and series including Folk Alliance and Sings Like Hell. He also regularly supported Karla Bonoff on tour while also serving as her accompanist.

Edwards was a prolific songwriter with at least 235 published BMI credits. Many of these compositions were incidental music for television programs produced by the NFL, NASCAR, Nat Geo TV, the PGA, Animal Planet, CBS This Morning, The Daily Show, Dateline NBC and many others. Among the artists who recorded his songs include the Nitty Gritty Dirt Band ("Mother of Love"), Lisa Haley & the Zydecats ("This Time Around", co-written with Wendy Waldman), Doug Stone ("Small Steps", co-written with Gary Burr) and Ronny Cox ("Silver City", co-written with Cox and Waldman).

== Death ==
Edwards died on August 18, 2010, after battles with cancer and a blood disorder. He had been diagnosed with the blood disorder thrombotic thrombocytopenic purpura (TTP) and had also been receiving chemotherapy for prostate cancer. He was 64 years old.

== Discography ==
=== Solo albums ===
- Kenny Edwards, Kenny Edwards (2002)
- Kenny Edwards, Resurrection Road (2009)

=== Collaborations ===
- Linda Ronstadt & the Stone Poneys, The Stone Poneys (1967)
- Linda Ronstadt & the Stone Poneys, Evergreen Vol. 2 (1967)
- Linda Ronstadt & the Stone Poneys, Stone Poneys and Friends Vol. 3 (1968)
- Steve Ambrose, Gypsy Moth (1972)
- Stone Poneys, Stoney End (best-of compilation) (1972)
- Wendy Waldman, Love Has Got Me (1973)
- Rod Taylor, Rod Taylor (1973)
- Linda Ronstadt, Heart Like a Wheel (1974)
- Wendy Waldman, Gypsy Symphony (1974)
- Rita Coolidge, Rita Coolidge (1974)
- B. W. Stevenson, Calabasas (1974)
- Linda Ronstadt, Prisoner in Disguise (1975)
- Wendy Waldman, Wendy Waldman (1975)
- Andrew Gold, Andrew Gold (1975)
- Linda Ronstadt, Hasten Down the Wind (1976)
- Wendy Waldman, The Main Refrain (1976)
- Andrew Gold, What's Wrong With This Picture (1976)
- JD Souther, Black Rose (1976)
- Iain Matthews, Go For Broke (1976)
- Linda Ronstadt, Simple Dreams (1977)
- Karla Bonoff, Karla Bonoff (1977)
- Linda Ronstadt, Living in the USA (1978)
- Warren Zevon, Excitable Boy (1978)
- Andrew Gold, All This and Heaven Too (1978)
- Karla Bonoff, Restless Nights (1979)
- JD Souther, You're Only Lonely (1979)
- Bonnie Raitt, Glow (1979)
- Jennifer Warnes, Shot Through the Heart (1979)
- Linda Ronstadt, Mad Love (1980)
- Rita Coolidge, Heartbreak Radio (1981)
- Linda Ronstadt, Get Closer (1982)
- Karla Bonoff, Wild Heart of the Young (1982)
- Don Henley, I Can't Stand Still (1982)
- Warren Zevon, The Envoy (1982)
- Stevie Nicks, Wild Heart (1983)
- Ringo Starr, Old Wave (1983)
- Stevie Nicks, Rock a Little (1985)
- Linda Ronstadt/Dolly Parton/Emmylou Harris, Trio (1987)
- Karla Bonoff, New World (1988)
- Brothers Figaro, Gypsy Beat (1990)
- Williams Brothers, Williams Brothers (1991)
- Wynonna, Tell Me Why (1993)
- Williams Brothers, Harmony Hotel (1993)
- Vince Gill, "When Will I Be Loved" (8 Seconds Soundtrack) (1994)
- Bryndle, Bryndle (1995)
- David Lee Murphy, Out with a Bang (1995)
- Warren Zevon, I'll Sleep When I'm Dead (An Anthology) (1996)
- Emmylou Harris, Portraits (1996)
- Tom Kell, Complicated Luck (1997)
- JD Souther, Rock and Roll Doctor: Lowell George Tribute (1997)
- Bryndle, House of Silence (2001)
- Dorothy Moskowitz, Do You Follow Me? (2004)
- Antara & Delilah, Red Barn Sessions (2007)
- Natalie D-Napoleon, Here in California (2009)
- Dick Annegarn, Folk Talk (2011)
- Natalie D-Napoleon, Leaving Me Dry (2012)
