= The Greenbriar Boys =

American northern bluegrass music group

- Origin: New York City, New York, U.S.
- Genres: Folk, bluegrass
- Years active: 1958–1970
- Label: Vanguard
- Past members: John Herald; Bob Yellin; Eric Weissberg; Paul Prestopino; Ralph Rinzler; Frank Wakefield; Jim Buchanan; Joe Isaacs

The Greenbriar Boys were an American northern bluegrass music group. who first got together in jam sessions in New York's Washington Square Park. The group disbanded in 1970.

== Biography ==
In 1958, guitarist and vocalist John Herald formed The Greenbriar Boys, along with Bob Yellin (banjo) and Eric Weissberg (fiddle, mandolin, banjo). Weissberg was soon replaced by Paul Prestopino, who, in turn was later replaced by Ralph Rinzler (mandolin) to form their most successful combination. The trio often played the Greenwich Village scene and became the first Northern group to win the Union Grove Fiddlers' Convention competition, where Yellin also took top honors for banjo.

They were credited as guest artists on two tracks from Joan Baez's 1961 album Joan Baez, Vol. 2. In 1962, they released their first (eponymous) album on Vanguard Records. Three more albums followed: Dián and the Greenbriar Boys in 1963 for Elektra (with Dián James, died 18 May 2006), Ragged but Right! in 1964, and Better Late Than Never in 1966 (with the additions of mandolinist/vocalist Frank Wakefield, who replaced Rinzler, and fiddler, Jim Buchanan). The 1966 album included the first recorded version of Mike Nesmith's "Different Drum", which was recorded again in 1967 by the Stone Poneys, and became a hit. This album was also the source for a subsequent Stone Poneys single, "Up To My Neck In High Muddy Water," with author credit to Wakefield, Herald, and Yellin.

By the last album, Rinzler had left to become director of the folklife area at the Smithsonian Institution which now bears his name. Rinzler was replaced in 1965 by the Tennessee-born mandolin virtuoso Frank Wakefield who, at the age of 31, was already a leading figure in bluegrass music, having performed since the age of 16 with such bluegrass stars as The Stanley Brothers, Jimmy Martin and Red Allen and the Kentuckians. He had made a Carnegie Hall appearance with Allen, had done guest spots on various TV programs and had appeared on dozens of records, including the first-ever all-bluegrass album produced by Smithsonian-Folkways Records. Wakefield's arrival therefore brought some welcome southern appalachian authenticity to what until then was a northern, urban and folkish-oriented group. Over the next four years, the close friendship and musical collaboration between John Herald, Bob Yellin, Jim Buchanan and Frank Wakefield resulted in some successful recordings and national television appearances. In addition to his mandolin playing, Wakefield's southern-accented lead and harmony vocals lent a distinctively rural sound to the Greenbriar Boys. Wakefield was also responsible for bringing young Kentucky-born guitarist and lead singer, Joe Isaacs, into the group by 1968. The Greenbriar Boys disbanded in 1970 as Wakefield launched what was to become a successful solo career. The Greenbriar Boys reunited occasionally in later years. John Herald released albums with The John Herald Band and a solo album, in 2000, Roll On John, before committing suicide in 2005.

== Discography ==
=== Studio albums ===
- 1962: The Greenbriar Boys (Vanguard)
- 1963: Dian & the Greenbriar Boys (Elektra)
- 1964: Ragged But Right! (Vanguard)
- 1966: Better Late Than Never! (Vanguard)

=== Compilations ===
- 1986: The Best of the Greenbriar Boys (Vanguard)
- 2002: Best of the Vanguard Years (Vanguard)
- 2003: Big Apple Bluegrass (Vanguard)
