= Steve Gillette and Cindy Mangsen =

American musical duo

Steve Gillette (born 1942) and Cindy Mangsen (born 1950) are American folk musicians and singer-songwriters who have been traveling, performing and recording together since their marriage in 1989.

Their album Live In Concert, recorded at The Ark in Ann Arbor in 1991, is available from their own company, Compass Rose Music. A second duet album, The Light Of The Day, was named Top Folk Album of 1996 by Rich Warren (WFMT) and Matt Watroba (WDET). Their third duet recording, A Sense Of Place, was released on Redwing Music in 2001. Their 2006 duet CD is called Being There (Compass Rose, 2006). In January, 2012, they released their latest duet album Home by Dark (Compass Rose, 2012).

Steve and Cindy also collaborated with Anne Hills and Michael Smith on a quartet recording of story-songs, Fourtold (Appleseed Records, 2003). The Ways Of The World (Compass Rose, 1992), a recording of 12 original songs produced by Jim Rooney, features studio back-up by Stuart Duncan, Mark Howard, Roy Huskey, Jr. and Mark Schatz. Steve's latest solo recording is Texas And Tennessee (Redwing Music), with Charles Cochran, Mark Graham, Mark Schatz, Pete Sutherland, Pete Wasner and others. The album was named one of 1998's Top Ten Folk Albums by Tower Records' Pulse Magazine.

Since Ian and Sylvia first recorded Darcy Farrow in 1965, Steve's songs have been sung by dozens of major artists including Tony Rice, The Stone Poneys, Linda Ronstadt, Garth Brooks, John Denver, Nanci Griffith, Waylon Jennings, Iain Matthews, Anne Murray, Josh Ritter, Kenny Rogers, Spanky and Our Gang, Don Williams and Tammy Wynette. He also wrote "There's a Place for You" for the film The Secret of the Pond.

== Discography ==
1991 Live in Concert
1996 The Light of the Day
2001 A Sense of Place
2006 Being There
2012 Home by Dark
