= Different Drum =

Single by The Stone Poneys

from the album Evergreen, Volume 2
- B-side: "I've Got to Know"
- Released: September 1967
- Genre: Baroque pop; folk rock; country
- Length: 2:45
- Label: Capitol
- Songwriter: Mike Nesmith
- Producer: Nick Venet

The Stone Poneys singles chronology
"One for One" (1967)	"Different Drum" (1967)	"Up to My Neck in High Muddy Water" (1968)

"Different Drum" is a song written by American singer-songwriter Michael Nesmith in 1964. It was first recorded by the bluegrass band The Greenbriar Boys and included on its 1966 album Better Late than Never! Nesmith offered it to his group the Monkees, but the producers of the Monkees TV show turned it down, though he did perform a short comic version of the song in one episode.

The song became popular in 1967 when it was recorded by the Stone Poneys who took it to No. 12 on the Cash Box Top 100, No. 13 on the Billboard Hot 100 chart, and No. 16 in Record World magazine. "Different Drum" had its strongest commercial performance in New Zealand, where it reached No. 5. In 1972, Nesmith recorded his own version. "Different Drum" has since been covered by other artists.

== The Greenbriar Boys version ==
Michael Nesmith wrote the song in 1964, early in his career as a singer-songwriter. "Different Drum" tells of a pair of lovers, one of whom wants to settle down while the other wants to retain a sense of freedom and independence. Its narrator is the lover who wants to remain free, telling the other that "we'll both live a lot longer" if they part ways now. Nesmith said: "The lyrics ... had nothing to do with my personal life – I was newly married with a pregnant wife."

In 1965, he shared the song with John Herald of the Greenbriar Boys. The following year Herald's group recorded it on its album Better Late Than Never!

== The Stone Poneys version ==
The song is best known for the 1967 version credited to the Stone Poneys, issued by Capitol Records, and featuring a vocal performance by up-and-coming 21-year-old singer Linda Ronstadt. It was Ronstadt's first hit single, reaching No. 13 on the Billboard Hot 100 as well as No. 12 on the Cash Box magazine singles chart. (It went to No. 1 in the Los Angeles market and No. 6 in Detroit.)

Ronstadt's version makes slight changes to the lyrics which were originally written from a male perspective to a female lover, replacing "girl" with "boy". The Stone Poneys had intended to record an acoustic version of the song as a ballad, but producer Nick Venet opted for a more complex instrumental approach for the recording session. This new orchestration used an arrangement by Jimmy Bond (who also played upright bass); a string section led by Sid Sharp; guitarists Al Viola and Bernie Leadon; drummer Jim Gordon; and harpsichord by Don Randi played in a mostly improvised quasi-baroque style. As a result, Ronstadt was the only member of the Stone Poneys who performed on the record. The released version was the second take, recorded live-in-the-studio with no overdubbing. The album rendition offers a different stereo mix from the hit single, including a longer harpsichord bridge.

Ronstadt later commented that she had been expecting to record the song as arranged by the Stone Poneys, and felt "completely confused" by the changed approach to the song due to the tight schedule which didn't allow her to rehearse with the new musicians. Even years later she perceived "fear and a lack of confidence" in her performance. Nesmith, on the other hand, said that Ronstadt's performance "infused it with a new level of passion and sensuality". Her bandmates in Stone Poneys recalled feeling no animosity when they were excluded from the recording sessions, agreeing the song should be a showcase for Ronstadt's vocal. In later live performances of the song, Nesmith would often sing the closing verse in the same singing style as the Ronstadt version.

=== Chart history ===
==== Weekly charts ====
Chart (1967–68)	Peak position
Australia (Go-Set)	9
Canada RPM Top Singles	12
New Zealand (Listener)	5
US Billboard Hot 100	13
US Cash Box Top 100	12

==== Year-end charts ====
Chart (1968)	Rank
Australia	39
US (Joel Whitburn's Pop Annual)	110

== Michael Nesmith versions ==
The song was performed on the Monkees television program when Nesmith rushed through a version of it in a comedy bit while performing as the character Billy Roy Hodstetter, in the Monkees television show episode "Too Many Girls", which aired in December 1966. Davy Jones mentions this during the commentary track on some DVDs of this episode.

Nesmith later re-recorded "Different Drum" for his 1972 LP And the Hits Just Keep on Comin'. His version contains four verses, as opposed to the three in Ronstadt's version.

== Other versions ==
The song has been covered by many artists, often modelled on Ronstadt's performance:

- P.P. Arnold
- Pete Burns
- Skeeter Davis
- Micky Dolenz
- Tanya Donelly with The Parkington Sisters
- Fastball
- Flying Emus
- Frog Holler
- Susanna Hoffs (with Matthew Sweet)
- The Jayhawks
- Gina Jeffreys
- La Sera
- The Lemonheads
- The Lennon Sisters
- Me First and the Gimme Gimmes
- The Pastels
- The Poppy Family with Susan Jacks
- Victoria Shaw
- Carrie Underwood
- Sara Watkins
- Paul Westerberg
- Sarah White
