= Stone Poneys =

American folk rock band

- Origin: Los Angeles, California, US
- Genre: Folk rock
- Years active: 1965–1968
- Label: Capitol
- Past members: Linda Ronstadt; Bobby Kimmel; Kenny Edwards; Shep Cooke; Kit Alderson; John Forsha; John Ware; John Keski; Herb Steiner; Bill Martin

Stone Poneys (also the Stone Poneys, Linda Ronstadt and the Stone Poneys, and the Stone Poneys with Linda Ronstadt) were a folk rock trio formed in Los Angeles, consisting of Linda Ronstadt on vocals, Bobby Kimmel on rhythm guitar and vocals, and Kenny Edwards on lead guitar. The group featured Ronstadt showcasing an eclectic mix of songs, often from under-appreciated songwriters, requiring a wide array of backing musicians. Their recordings include Ronstadt's first hit song, a cover of Mike Nesmith's "Different Drum", recorded without the other members of the group. The band released three albums: The Stone Poneys; Evergreen, Volume 2; and Linda Ronstadt, Stone Poneys and Friends, Vol. III. The three albums were reissued in CD format in the 1990s in the US. The first two albums were reissued in Australia in 2008.

== History of the band ==
=== Early meetings ===
Linda Ronstadt first met Bobby Kimmel as a teenager in 1960 while performing gigs in and around Tucson, Arizona, with her older brother Peter and older sister Suzi (under the name The Three Ronstadts, among others). The three Ronstadts joined with Kimmel and a local banjo player named Richard Saltus, performing locally as The New Union Ramblers.

Kimmel, six years older than Ronstadt (who was 14), was impressed with her strong voice and enthusiasm. He moved to Southern California around 1961 and wrote regularly to cajole Ronstadt into joining him throughout her high school years at Catalina High School. Kimmel had already met and befriended Edwards shortly before Ronstadt's arrival in Los Angeles, and they had started writing folk-rock songs together.

=== Making the band ===
In 1964, Ronstadt moved to Los Angeles to join Bobby Kimmel and form a band. Ronstadt described Kimmel's vision of the band: "It was going to be five people. We had an electric autoharp and a girl singer... we thought we were unique in the world... It turned out Jefferson Airplane and The Lovin' Spoonful had beaten us." The group trimmed down to a trio that called themselves The Stone Poneys. Their (misspelled) name came from Delta blues singer Charley Patton's 1929 song, "The Stone Pony Blues" (also known as "Pony Blues").

The band was discovered by a couple of music industry executives while rehearsing at a soul food restaurant called Olivia's in Ocean Park, a community between Venice Beach and Santa Monica. Olivia's was famous for its food and performers including the Doors. In 1965, the band recorded the Johnny Otis song "So Fine" and several others. Mike Curb, who at the time was working for Mercury, produced the sessions. The record company wanted them to change the group's name to "The Signets" and sing surf music, which the trio did not opt to do. Instead, the Stone Poneys became a leading attraction on the Los Angeles club circuit, with Ronstadt usually performing on stage in a miniskirt and bare feet. They worked in intimate clubs like The Troubadour in Hollywood, California, where they opened for artists including Odetta and Oscar Brown Jr.; The Insomniac in Hermosa Beach, where they often appeared with the Chambers Brothers; and The Bitter End in Greenwich Village.

One night at The Troubadour, the band's first manager, Herb Cohen, told Kimmel in front of Ronstadt: "Well, I can get your chick singer recorded, but I don't know about the rest of the group". Ronstadt called this "the beginning of the end", although this occurred even before they were signed to Capitol Records and Ronstadt insisted that she would not record without the band. The Stone Poneys broke up briefly in this time period, and Cohen tried to connect Ronstadt with Frank Zappa to make a demo, and also with Jack Nitzsche, but nothing ever materialized. She and Zappa were both managed by Cohen and later made a radio commercial for Remington brand electric shavers which was rejected by Remington.

=== Record deal ===
After the Poneys reformed, Cohen introduced Ronstadt, Edwards, and Kimmel to Nick Venet (also known as Nik Venet) at The Troubadour. Venet signed the band to Capitol Records in the summer of 1966. Ronstadt remembered, "Capitol wanted me as a solo, but Nick convinced them I wasn't ready, that I would develop. It was true." In a late 1966 article in Billboard, Venet referenced the formation of a new record label under Capitol called FolkWorld specifically to promote folk-rock artists. Although the FolkWorld concept was never realized, The Stone Poneys became the lead act in the stable of folk-rock performers that Venet was signing and producing in this time period. The three albums by the Stone Poneys were produced by Nick Venet. The band's original songs were credited to Kimmel and Edwards, although later CD reissues removed Edwards' name from most of the credits. BMI's website now credits all original Kimmel-Edwards songs to Kimmel alone, resulting in "Back Home" being Edwards's lone songwriting credit with the Stone Poneys.

The first album, simply called The Stone Poneys, was more folk than rock and featured relatively few lead vocals by Ronstadt; it received little notice. The band again broke up briefly between the first two albums; but, as related by Edwards, Venet told the band: "'We can make another record, we can make this happen. If we're going to do anything with this, we've got to make something that sounds commercial and get on the radio."

=== Hit song and further stresses ===
For the second album, Evergreen, Volume 2, the songs were in more of a rock vein; and Ronstadt was moved firmly into the lead vocalist position, with only occasional harmony vocals. The album includes the band's only hit song, "Different Drum". The original recording by The Stone Poneys of "Different Drum" was quite similar to the recorded version by The Greenbriar Boys from their 1966 album Better Late than Never!; but as Edwards said, "That's when Nik Venet sort of took an executive position and went, 'This could be a hit song, and we need to sort of have an arranger arrange it.' So none of us actually played on the record version of that." (A live performance of "Different Drum" in the earlier style survives, however.) The original album version of "Different Drum" from 1967 had a slightly longer run time (2:46) from the single edit (2:35), owing to a repeat of the harpsichord break in the middle of the song. All versions of the song reissued after that time have been the single edit although listed with the longer run time.

That was not the only instance of the male band members being pushed out of the recording studio. Ironically, one of the few songs on the second album to feature harmony vocals, "Back on the Street Again" was a duet by Ronstadt and songwriter Steve Gillette (though Ronstadt's voice was clearly on top); Gillette remembers from the session: "[T]here was a scuffle and some noise just outside the door. When we opened it, there was a sad and for some, tearful scene in which it became clear that Kenny [Edwards] and Bobby [Kimmel] had not been notified of the session, and had heard about it indirectly and showed up full of anger at the betrayal. Capitol really did try to break the group up.”

The success of "Different Drum" effectively spelled the end of The Stone Poneys as a band: Almost immediately, they started to become known as "Linda Ronstadt and The Stone Poneys". Also unlike the other 45s, which had been released solely under the name of the band, the "Different Drum" single also included in small letters: "Featuring Linda Ronstadt". As Edwards said, "From the record company's point of view, immediately they wanted to push Linda as a solo artist... frankly, Linda's taste in songs was really growing away from what Bobby was writing... There was a spontaneous growth toward her being a solo artist."

A series of club dates throughout the United States to support the second album followed. Ronstadt remembers opening for The Paul Butterfield Blues Band at the Cafe Au Go Go in Greenwich Village as one of her worst experiences with the band: "Here we were rejected by the hippest element in New York as lame. We broke up right after that. We couldn't bear to look at each other."

=== Emergence of a star ===
During work on the band's third album, in early 1968, Edwards departed for India. After "Different Drum" hit the charts, Kimmel and Ronstadt rounded up some more musicians, and the reformed Stone Poneys began touring with The Doors. Doors frontman Jim Morrison didn't endear himself to Ronstadt; she recalled: "We thought they were a good band, but we didn't like the singer". After the tour, Kimmel left the band.

Ronstadt gamely moved forward and, effectively a solo artist already, started taking control of her career. She gathered more sophisticated material for the new album, including three songs by Tim Buckley that would become standout cuts on that album. "Tim used to live in a house that I lived in too and we both used to move in and out... we stayed there alternately. It was the house he wrote about in 'Morning Glory', which I call 'The Hobo'. That was the 'fleeting house.'" Buckley was among those in the group photograph who appeared on the back cover of the third album.

Although their final album still appears to be in the name of the band, the album name, Linda Ronstadt, Stone Poneys and Friends, Vol. III was purposefully vague, without a specific artist's name. Even the two singles from the album were released under different names, though Linda Ronstadt now had the burden of the Capitol recording contract: "See, The [Stone] Poneys were taken off the books after the second album. Since it was a hit, they made royalties off it. But I didn't. I paid all by myself for the third album, which was expensive, and it put me severely in the red by the time I started recording my first solo album."

=== Later incarnations ===
By late 1967, Ronstadt began recruiting musicians to assist in the studio and also on the road. One of the first was an old friend from Tucson, Shep Cooke. He had already turned down Ronstadt's invitation to join Stone Poneys twice (in 1966 and also in early 1967); when she asked him again in late 1967: "Something told me I'd better not decline a third time. 'Different Drum' was climbing up the charts, and I couldn't refuse. So I joined the Stone Poneys in November 1967." Another latter-day member of Stone Poneys was Kit Alderson, who would later help train Joaquin Phoenix and Reese Witherspoon in the guitar and autoharp, respectively, for their work in the 2005 Johnny Cash/June Carter Cash biopic film Walk the Line. By November 1968, a different group of musicians were billing themselves as The Stone Poneys. Joining Ronstadt was guitarist John Forsha–who was also a session player on the band's first two albums–drummer John Ware, bassist John Keski, steel guitarist Herb Steiner, and drummer Bill Martin.

Purists might contend that these Stone Poneys were not the real band, only backing musicians for Linda Ronstadt; however, they were still being billed as Stone Poneys, and many of the musicians still view themselves as "ex-Stone Poneys". Shep Cooke fondly remembers his time with the band: "We rehearsed like crazy, finished the third Stone Poney album, toured the entire country for 2½ months, played on Joey Bishop's and Johnny Carson's TV shows*, went crazy for lack of sleep, and parted company (after the last gig in late 1968) reasonably good friends but a little disillusioned about 'the big time'."

(*A Tonight Show Stone Poneys appearance never aired. Ronstadt first appeared on the late night talk show in 1969. Her second appearance wasn't until 1983.)

=== Post break-up ===
Despite the lack of big hits, Ronstadt was becoming increasingly well known following the success of "Different Drum", and in 1969 she officially went solo with her album Hand Sown...Home Grown. However, beginning in the mid-1970s, Edwards recorded and toured with Linda for about 10 years. In 2007, Ronstadt reconnected with Kimmel in Tucson and sang harmony vocals on one of Kimmel's songs, "Into the Arms of Love" that was included on a CD released that year by his new band, BK Special.

== Albums and singles ==
=== Official Capitol releases ===
On the first two albums, most of the songs were written by Kimmel and Edwards. Under the guidance of producer Nik Venet and Capitol, the group recorded their first album in the fall of 1966, The Stone Poneys, which was released in January 1967. The album is notable for its precise strong-voiced harmony vocals. The disc's one and only single release "Sweet Summer Blue and Gold" received no airplay and failed to chart anywhere. (The first album is now mainly known by the name of the 1975 reissue, The Stone Poneys Featuring Linda Ronstadt).

The second album, Evergreen, Volume 2 was released in June 1967. On this album, Ronstadt sang lead vocals on almost all songs. The exception was the title track, which has a psychedelic rock feel. Edwards was the vocalist on "Part One", while "Part Two" was an instrumental that featured fine sitar work (also by Edwards).

The band hit pay dirt with Michael Nesmith's "Different Drum" (written and copyrighted in 1965 prior to Nesmith joining The Monkees), the second 45 (following "One for One") from the new album. The band's version of "Different Drum" hit the Billboard pop chart on November 11, 1967 and stayed in the Hot 100 for 17 weeks, getting as high as No. 13. The song also reached No. 12 on the Cash Box survey. The song has been a staple on oldies radio ever since and remains one of Linda Ronstadt's most popular recordings. Its parent record slid up Billboard's main album chart to No. 100 and lasted for a respectable 15 weeks on that chart.

Their third album was titled Linda Ronstadt, Stone Poneys and Friends, Vol. III (released in April 1968); at this point, Capitol was promoting Linda Ronstadt rather than the band, and only Linda's picture was on the cover. Like its predecessor, the album had two singles: "Up to My Neck in High Muddy Water" b/w "Carnival Bear" (released under the name Ronstadt and the Stone Poneys) which stalled at No. 93 on the Hot 100; and "Some of Shelly's Blues" b/w "Hobo" (released under the name Stone Poneys, Featuring Linda Ronstadt) which, like the album, did not chart in the US, but reached No. 94 in Canada. "Some of Shelly's Blues" was another Michael Nesmith song. The album ended with the Laura Nyro song, "Stoney End", which turned out to have been aptly named (although the song was not written for The Stone Poneys).

=== "So Fine" single ===
After "Different Drum" became a hit, Mike Curb pulled out two of the recordings he had produced back in 1965, "So Fine" and "Everybody Has His Own Ideas", and decided to release them in 1968 as a 45 on his label Sidewalk, which was a Capitol subsidiary. The single was put out without the knowledge of Capitol–or Mercury either, for that matter, who had paid for the recording session. Capitol record company executives were understandably furious, and the single was immediately pulled from the market. Thus the disk has become one of the rarest Linda Ronstadt collectables, bringing as much as $144 (in a 2007 eBay auction).

=== Reissues ===
In the early 1970s, the Pickwick record label licensed several Stone Poneys tracks from their Capitol albums. Five of these songs were included as Side 2 on a dual compilation album called Back on the Street Again (catalog number SPC-3245), with Side 1 consisting of five songs by David Clayton-Thomas which are taken from solo albums that he was recording while serving as the lead singer for Blood, Sweat and Tears. Other than the title song and "Different Drum", the Stone Poneys songs on this album are relatively obscure tracks that have hardly appeared at all on Ronstadt's compilation albums over the years: "Song About the Rain", "I've Got to Know" (also known as "I'd Like to Know") and "New Hard Times". Apparently a little later, Pickwick released Stoney End (catalog number SPC-3298) under the name Linda Ronstadt & The Stone Poneys. The only song included on both of the Pickwick albums is "Different Drum"; the other tracks on this album are mostly familiar songs like "One for One" and "Some of Shelly's Blues", as well as their recording of the 1960s classic "Let's Get Together". (The album was released on the heels of the successful reissue of the version by The Youngbloods in 1969).

In 1974, prior to the release of Heart Like A Wheel, Capitol released a Linda Ronstadt compilation titled Different Drum, which featured five Stone Poney tracks and five songs from Ronstadt's first three solo albums. Aside from the title track, the four Stone Poneys tracks were remixed tracks from the third Stone Poneys' album, all featuring Ronstadt solo: "Hobo," "Up to My Neck in High Muddy Water", "Some Of Shelly's Blues", and "Stoney End".

Eight years after the release of the band's first album (in March 1975), it was reissued by Capitol under the name The Stone Poneys Featuring Linda Ronstadt, as a result of the multi-platinum success Ronstadt had in 1974-75 as a solo artist with the No. 1 album Heart Like A Wheel. The song listing in the reissue highlighted Ronstadt's three solo performances (she also sang solo on one verse in a fourth song that was not so identified). As a result, the largely unknown first album by The Stone Poneys was more widely available in the 1970s and 1980s than the subsequent albums that featured the band's more familiar songs. In 1995, Capitol briefly issued the three Stone Poneys albums as individual CD releases. The releases were removed from the catalog within a few years. In 2008, the Australian label Raven released The Stone Poneys, a 27-track "two-fer" CD featuring the first two Stone Poneys albums plus four tracks from their third album.

Ronstadt has claimed dissatisfaction with the arrangements of the three Stone Poneys albums many times over the years, but Capitol has continually made money through reissues of the early material in numerous configurations. Also, in addition to their hit song "Different Drum", several of the other Stone Poneys tracks have been featured in many of Ronstadt's compilation albums over the years, such as "Hobo", "Some of Shelly's Blues" and "Stoney End".

=== Unreleased material ===
The now deleted Linda Ronstadt Box Set included the initial release of "Everybody Has His Own Ideas" besides the original 45; otherwise, the only Stone Poneys music made available on CD has been the songs on the original three albums, which has left many songs such as "Carnival Bear", from a 1968 single that never appeared on any of the albums, without any available issue. Even the three song "fragments" that open the third album–which are barely 1½ minutes– have never been reissued as full songs.

== Discography ==
=== Albums ===
Title	Details	Peak chart positions
Title	Details	US
The Stone Poneys	Released: January 30, 1967; Label: Capitol; Format: LP	—
Evergreen, Volume 2	Released: June 12, 1967; Label: Capitol; Format: LP	100
Linda Ronstadt, Stone Poneys and Friends, Vol. III	Released: April 29, 1968; Label: Capitol; Format: LP	—

=== Singles ===
Title	Year	Peak chart positions	Album
Title	Year	US	Album
"Sweet Summer Blue and Gold"	1967	—	The Stone Poneys
"One for One"	1967	—	Evergreen, Vol. 2
"Different Drum"	1967	13	Evergreen, Vol. 2
"Up to My Neck in High Muddy Water"	1968	93	Linda Ronstadt, Stone Poneys and Friends, Vol. III
"Some of Shelly's Blues"	1968	—	Linda Ronstadt, Stone Poneys and Friends, Vol. III

==== Promotional singles ====
Title	Year	Album
"So Fine"	1967	Non-album single
