= The Mambo Kings (soundtrack) =

Soundtrack album
- Released: 1992
- Recorded: in New York, NY and Los Angeles, CA
- Genre: Salsa, Boogaloo, mambo, Latin jazz, Bolero, Tropical
- Length: 48:28
- Label: Elektra 61240, 1992; Elektra 62505-2, 2000
- Producer: Robert Kraft

Professional ratings
Review scores
| Source | Rating |
|---|---|
| Allmusic | 4/5 stars |

The Mambo Kings is the soundtrack to the 1992 film of the same name, based on Oscar Hijuelos's Pulitzer Prize-winning novel The Mambo Kings Play Songs of Love. Artists featured on the album include Tito Puente, Celia Cruz, Benny Moré, Arturo Sandoval, Linda Ronstadt and Los Lobos. It also features the Mambo All-Stars, a band composed of studio sidemen from New York City and Los Angeles. With only a couple of exceptions, the tracks were made specifically for the film. The 2000 Elektra updated edition adds a remix of Tito Puente's "Ran Kan Kan" by Olga Tañón and a rendition of "Beautiful Maria of My Soul" featuring Antonio Banderas and Compay Segundo of Buena Vista Social Club fame.

== Track listing ==
The Mambo Kings track listing
| No. | Title | Writer(s) | Performer(s) | Length |
|---|---|---|---|---|
| 1. | "La Dicha Mía" | J. Pacheco | Celia Cruz | 3:20 |
| 2. | "Ran Kan Kan" | T. Puente | Tito Puente | 2:50 |
| 3. | "Cuban Pete" | José Norman | Tito Puente | 2:25 |
| 4. | "Mambo Caliente" | A. Sandoval | Arturo Sandoval | 3:26 |
| 5. | "Quiéreme Mucho" | Gonzalo Roig / Agustín Rodríguez | Linda Ronstadt | 2:57 |
| 6. | "Sunny Ray" | Ray Santos | Mambo All-Stars | 2:35 |
| 7. | "Melao de Caña" | Mercedes Pedroso | Celia Cruz | 2:51 |
| 8. | "Beautiful Maria of My Soul (Bella María de mi Alma)" | Robert Kraft / Arne Glimcher | Antonio Banderas | 4:10 |
| 9. | "Para los Rumberos" | T. Puente | Tito Puente | 1:51 |
| 10. | "Perfidia" | Alberto Domínguez | Linda Ronstadt | 3:41 |
| 11. | "Guantanamera" | Fernández / Orbón / Angulo, based on a poem by José Martí | Celia Cruz | 3:05 |
| 12. | "Tea for Two" | V. Youmans | Mambo All-Stars | 2:31 |
| 13. | "Accidental Mambo" | C. Franzetti | Mambo All-Stars | 1:23 |
| 14. | "Cómo fue" | Ernesto Duarte | Benny Moré | 2:54 |
| 15. | "Tanga, Rumba Afro-Cubana" | Mario Bauza | Mambo All-Stars | 3:31 |
| 16. | "Beautiful Maria of My Soul" | Robert Kraft / Arne Glimcher | Los Lobos | 4:26 |
| Total length: | | | | 48:28 |

== Arrangements ==
- Johnny Pacheco / Pedro Knight (track 1)
- Tito Puente (tracks 2, 3, 9)
- Alberto Naranjo (track 4 [orchestration])
- Arturo Sandoval (track 4 [arrangement])
- Ray Santos (tracks 5, 6, 7, 8, 10, 12, 15)
- Pete Seeger / Ray Santos (track 11)
- Carlos Franzetti (track 13)
- Ernesto Duarte (track 14)
- Domenico Savino / Ray Santos (track 15)
- Los Lobos (track 16)

== Chart performance ==
| Chart (1992) | Peak position |
|---|---|
| U.S. Billboard 200 | 50 |
| U.S. Billboard Top Latin Albums | 3 |
| U.S. Billboard Tropical Albums | 1 |

== Album certification ==
| Region | Certification | Certified units/sales |
|---|---|---|
| United States (RIAA) | Gold | 500,000^{^} |
^{^} Shipments figures based on certification alone.

== Credits ==
- Robert Kraft, producer
- Steve Ralbovsky, executive producer
- Robin Urdang, music coordinator
- Thomas Drescher, supervising music editor
- Michael Golub, recording engineer and mixing
- Michael Farrow, recording engineer and mixing
- Frank Wolf, recording engineer
- Dan Stein, technical assistant
- Recorded at:

Soundtrack Studios (NY)
Skyline Studios (NY)
BMG Recording Studio (NY)
Clinton Studio (NY)
Capitol Recording Studio (LA)

- Mastered by:

Greg Calbi at Sterling Sound (NY)

- Oscar Hijuelos, liner notes

== Awards and nominations ==
Awards and nominations for The Mambo Kings
| Award | Date | Category | Nominee | Result | Ref. |
|---|---|---|---|---|---|
| Academy Awards | March 29, 1993 | Best Original Song | "Beautiful Maria of My Soul" – Robert Kraft (music), Arne Glimcher (lyrics) | Nominated | |
| Golden Globe Awards | January 23, 1993 | Best Original Song, Motion Picture | "Beautiful Maria of My Soul" – Robert Kraft (music), Arne Glimcher (lyrics) | Nominated | |
| Grammy Awards | February 24, 1993 | Best Instrumental Composition for a Motion Picture | "Mambo Caliente" – Arturo Sandoval (composer, arranger and performer), Alberto Naranjo (orchestrator) | Nominated | |
| Grammy Awards | February 24, 1993 | Best Original Song for a Motion Picture | "Beautiful Maria of My Soul" – Robert Kraft (music), Arne Glimcher (lyrics), Antonio Banderas (performer), Ray Santos (arranger) | Nominated | |

== See also ==
- List of number-one Billboard Tropical Albums from the 1990s
