= Beautiful Maria of My Soul =

1992 song

"Beautiful Maria of my Soul" (Spanish: Bella María de mi alma) is a song prominently featured in the 1992 motion picture The Mambo Kings. In the film, it is performed in Spanish by Antonio Banderas and it also appears on the film's soundtrack album in an English version by Los Lobos. The song was written and composed by Arne Glimcher and Robert Kraft. The film is based on the 1989 novel The Mambo Kings Play Songs of Love by Oscar Hijuelos.

In the film, the character Nestor Castillo (Banderas) writes the song for his long-lost love, Maria Rivera (Talisa Soto). In 2010, Hijuelos released a follow up novel, also entitled Beautiful Maria of My Soul, centering on Maria.

This song was nominated for the Academy Award for Best Original Song at the 65th Academy Awards, eventually won by "A Whole New World", from Aladdin. Banderas turned down performing the song live, and tenor Plácido Domingo became the first Spaniard to perform at the Academy Awards where he was accompanied by Sheila E. The song was also nominated for the Grammy Award for Best Song Written Specifically for a Motion Picture of Television at the 35th Annual Grammy Awards and the Golden Globe Award for Best Original Song at the 50th Golden Globe Awards. Los Lobos' version of the song peaked at #11 on the Hot Latin Songs chart.

Italian pop duo Paola & Chiara covered the song in their 2002 studio album Festival.
