= Frenesí (album) =

1992 studio album by Linda Ronstadt

Studio album by Linda Ronstadt
- Released: August 25, 1992
- Genres: Mambo; bolero
- Length: 42:22
- Language: Spanish
- Labels: Elektra; Rhino
- Producers: Peter Asher; George Massenburg

Linda Ronstadt chronology
| Mas Canciones (1991) | Frenesí (1992) | Winter Light (1993) |

Frenesí (transl. Frenzy) is a studio album by the American singer Linda Ronstadt. It was released on August 25, 1992, by Elektra and Rhino Records. A mambo and bolero album, Ronstadt covers Latin standards with arrangements done by Ray Santos. She was influenced to record the album following her participation in The Mambo Kings (1992) film. The record's productions were handled by Peter Asher and George Massenburg. The album was promoted with four promotional singles: the title track, "Entre Abismos", "Piensa en Mí", and "Piel Canela".

Following its release, Frenesí was met with mixed reactions from music critics. While Santos' arrangements were mostly praised, critics were divided on Ronstadt's delivery on the songs. Despite the reception, the record won Best Tropical Latin Album at the 35th Annual Grammy Awards in 1993. Commercially, it reached number 193 and two on the Billboard 200 and the Tropical Albums charts in the United States and number 79 in the Netherlands.

== Background and musical style ==
In August 1991, Linda Ronstadt revealed that she recorded two songs for the film The Mambo Kings (1992), "Quiéreme Mucho" and "Perfidia". The recordings influenced her to record an album of mambo standards. Ronstadt recruited American musician and bandleader Ray Santos, who arranged most of the tracks on the soundtrack to The Mambo Kings, for the album.

The album's title was announced in June 1992 and is her third Spanish-language album after Canciones de Mi Padre (1987) and Mas Canciones (1991). It features the singer covering Latin standards, namely mambos and boleros. Ronstadt re-recorded "Quiéreme Mucho" and "Perfidia" for the album. The record was produced by George Massenburg and Ronstadt's longtime collaborator Peter Asher.

== Promotion and reception ==
Professional ratings
Review scores
| Source | Rating |
|---|---|
| AllMusic | 2/5 stars |
| Entertainment Weekly | C |
| The Cincinnati Enquirer | 3/5 stars |
| The Indianapolis Star | 3.5/4 stars |
| Los Angeles Times | 2.5/4 stars |
| Oakland Tribune | 3/4 stars |
| The San Diego Union-Tribune | 1.5/4 stars |
| The Times | 3.5/5 stars |

Frenesí was released on August 25, 1992, by Elektra Records and Rhino Records. The title track and "Entre Abismos" were released as promotional singles for the album in the US, while "Piel Canela" and "Piensa en Mi" did the same in Europe. "Frenesí" and "Entre Abismos" peaked at numbers seven and 33 on the Billboard Hot Latin Songs chart, respectively. A tour in the US was planned to promote the album, but was cancelled following the destruction of Hurricane Andrew in Florida.

AllMusic editor Roch Parisien was critical of Frenesí and commented that there's "little that sounds street level or rootsy about these sessions", though Parisien stated some tracks such as "Entre Abismos" "swing mightily". Billboard reviewer Paul Verna felt that Santos' arrangements and Ronstadt's vocals "prevent record from soaring on up-tempo numbers", but complimented the singer on the boleros. Greg Sandow graded the record a "C". Although Sandow found the Ray Santos Orchestra to be "touching and addictive", he was not impressed with Ronstadt's vocal delivery on the "strain of singing loudly makes her voice go hard and flat".

Cliff Radel of The Cincinnati Enquirer praised the artist for singing in Spanish "with a simmering passion that dances cheek to cheek with fiery trumpets and regal Latin rhythms". In a positive review of the album, The Indianapolis Star critic Judy Wolf lauded Ronstadt's "incredible voice" and opined that the string sections are "well suited to support and accent her power". Wolf also complimented the orchestra as a "good fit as Nelson Riddle". Enrique Blanc stated that while the artist "faithful to the sound that these musical styles had in the '30s, '40s and '50s", he commented that Ronstadt "doesn’t go beyond nostalgia".

Larry Kelp wrote for the Oakland Tribune that the arrangements by Santos' orchestra as "gorgeous" and observed that she "sound comfortable" performing the songs. However, Kelp noted "rarely is there much emotional depth in her delivery". A reviewer for The Times claimed Frenesí is "her most satisfying effort in years". George Varga of The San Diego Union-Tribune was more critical of the record. While noting the notable musicians on Santos' orchestra, he found their performance to be "too innocuous to offer any real challenge" and felt Ronstadt's renditions "turns them into case studies in triteness."

At the 35th Annual Grammy Awards in 1993, Frenesí won the Grammy Award for Best Tropical Latin Album. Commercially, Frenesí peaked at number 193 on the Billboard 200 and number two on the Tropical Albums charts in the US. It was fifth best-selling tropical album of 1993 in the country. The album also reached number 79 in the Netherlands.

== Track listing ==
| No. | Title | Writer(s) | Length |
|---|---|---|---|
| 1. | "Frenesí" | Alberto Domínguez; Leonard Whitcup | 3:30 |
| 2. | "Mentira Salomé" | Ignacio Piñeiro | 2:50 |
| 3. | "Alma Adentro" | Sylvia Rexach | 3:11 |
| 4. | "Entre Abismos" | Victor Manuel Mato | 3:21 |
| 5. | "Cuando Me Querías Tú" | Emilio Catarell Vela | 3:07 |
| 6. | "Piel Canela" | Bobby Capó; Silvano Michelino; X. Regianni | 3:02 |
| 7. | "Verdad Amarga" | Consuelo Velázquez | 3:23 |
| 8. | "Despojos" | Francisco Arrieta | 3:02 |
| 9. | "En Mi Soledad" | Miguel Pous | 2:53 |
| 10. | "Piensa en Mí" | Maria Teresa Lara | 2:55 |
| 11. | "Quiéreme Mucho" | Augustin Rodriguez; Gonzalo Roig | 3:23 |
| 12. | "Perfidia" | Alberto Dominguez; Milton Leeds | 3:44 |
| 13. | "Te Quiero Dijiste" | Maria Mendez Grever | 4:01 |
| Total length: | | | 42:22 |

== Personnel ==
Credits adapted from AllMusic and the liner notes of Frenesí.

=== Performance credits ===
- Linda Ronstadt – vocals
- Juan Jose Almaguer, Jesús Guzmán and Monica Trevino – vocal trio
- Tito Allen, Yayo "El Indio" Pequero and Adalberto Santiago – chorus

The Ray Santos Orchestra

- Ray Santos – arrangements
- Joe Rotondi Jr. – grand piano
- Bob Mann – acoustic guitar
- Gilberto Puente – acoustic guitar
- Yomo Toro – tres
- Guillermo Edghill – bass guitar
- Oscar Meza – bass guitar
- Luis Conte – percussion
- Walfredo Reyes, Jr. – percussion
- Jose Hidalgo – percussion
- Armando Peraza – percussion
- Pancho Roman – percussion
- Orestes Vilató – percussion
- Justo Almario – horns
- Gene Burkert – horns
- Terry Herrington – horns
- Joel Peskin – horns
- Michael Turre – horns
- Arturo Velasco – horns
- Dennis Farias – horns
- Daniel Fornero – horns
- Ramon Flores – horns
- Harry Kim – horns
- José Román – horns

Skywalker Symphony (Tracks 1–10 & 13)

- Jenny Amador, Jeff Beal, Deborah Bellamy, Stuart Canin, Jeremy Cohen, Adrienne Duckworth, James Dukey, Joseph Edelberg, Ronald Ericson, Nina Flyer, Clifton Foster, Ruth Freeman, Deborah Henry, Jim Hurley, Roxann Jacobson, David Kadarauch, William Klingelhofer, Katheryn McElrath, Sharon O'Connor, Virginia Price-Kvistad, Martha Rubin, Nathan Rubin, Irene Sazer, Rebecca Sebring, James Shallenberger, Greg Sudmeir, Mark Summer and John Tenney – orchestra players

String section (Tracks 11 & 12)

- Daniel Kobialka – concertmaster
- Deborah Bellamy, Robert Galbraith, Lloyd Gowen, Elizabeth Hedges-Glatty, Ellen Pesavento, Nora Pirquet, Thomas Rose, Nancy Stenzen and Marianne Wagner – string players

=== Technical credits ===
- George Massenburg – producer (1–10, 13), engineer (1–10, 13), mixing
- Peter Asher – producer (11, 12)
- Nathaniel Kunkel – engineer (1–10, 13)
- Shawn Murphy – recording (11, 12)
- David Gleeson – assistant engineer
- Craig Silvey – assistant engineer
- Brett Swain – assistant engineer
- Doug Sax – mastering at The Mastering Lab (Hollywood, California)
- Robert Blakeman – photography
- John Kosh – art direction, design

== Charts ==
=== Weekly charts ===
Weekly chart performance for Frenesí
| Chart (1992) | Peak position |
|---|---|
| Australian Albums (ARIA) | 197 |
| Dutch Albums (Album Top 100) | 79 |
| US Billboard 200 | 193 |
| US Tropical Albums (Billboard) | 2 |

Weekly chart performance for Frenesí
| Chart (1993) | Peak position |
|---|---|
| US Top Latin Albums (Billboard) | 17 |

=== Year-end charts ===
1993 year-end chart performance for Frenesí
| Chart (1993) | Position |
|---|---|
| US Tropical Albums (Billboard) | 5 |
