= Perfidia =

Song written by Alberto Domínguez

Single by Xavier Cugat and His Waldorf-Astoria Orchestra
- Language: Spanish
- English title: Perfidy
- B-side: "Nana"
- Published: 1939
- Released: August 21, 1939
- Recorded: June 12, 1939
- Genre: Bolero
- Label: Victor
- Songwriter: Alberto Domínguez
- Lyricist: Milton Leeds (English version only)

External audio
- You may listen to Juan Arvizu performing Alberto Domínguez's bolero Perfidia with the Lorenzo Barcelata Orchestra here

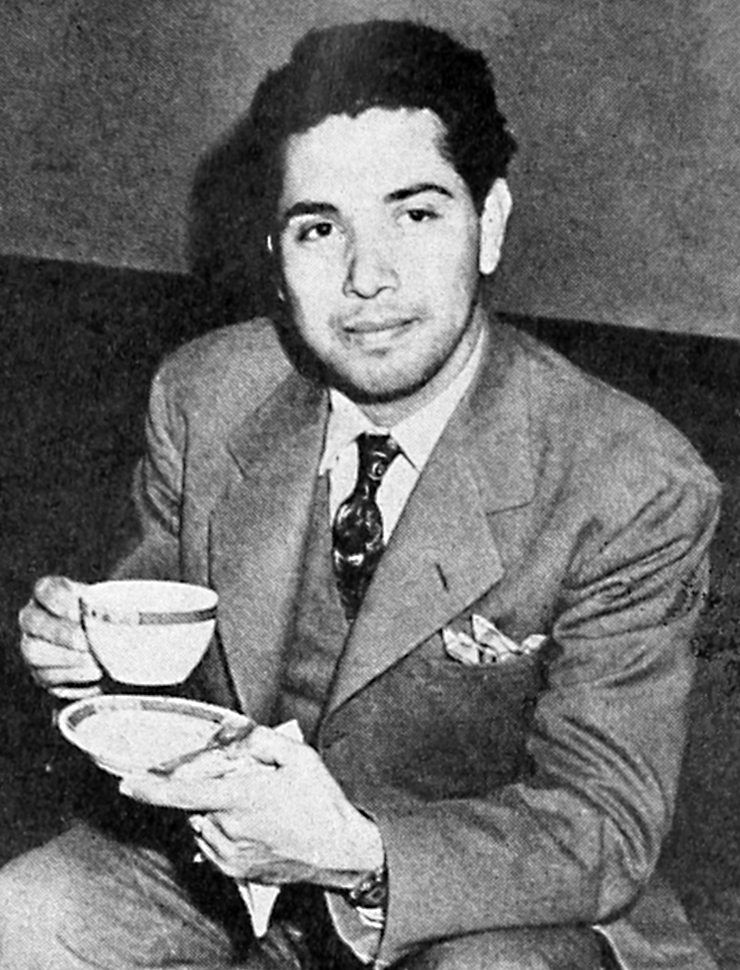
Songwriter Alberto Domínguez in 1941

"Perfidia" (Spanish for "perfidy") is a 1939 Spanish-language song written by Mexican composer and arranger Alberto Domínguez (1906–1975). The song is sung from the perspective of a man whose lover has left him. The song has also been recorded in English (with lyrics by Milton Leeds) and as an instrumental.

== Recordings ==
- The song became a hit for Xavier Cugat on the Victor label in 1940.
- Los Panchos recorded Perfidia in 1947 February 17, and it became one of their most popular songs.
- In late 1960, a rock instrumental version of "Perfidia" was released by the Ventures, which rose to number 15 on the Billboard chart. The record was a Top 10 hit on a number of popular US music radio stations.

== Other recordings ==
"Perfidia" has been recorded by several artists, including:

- Glenn Miller Orchestra
- Juan Arvizu
- Crveni Koralji
- Xavier Cugat
- Carlos García. A Mexican street performer who makes music by blowing on the side of an ivy leaf. Recorded on a sidewalk, and featured on a CD, Sinfonia Urbana. It was overdubbed with strings by the Kronos Quartet for their 2002 album Nuevo.
- Mel Tormé on his 1959, ¡Olé Tormé!: Mel Tormé Goes South of the Border with Billy May
- Nat King Cole
- Phyllis Dillon on Treasure isle 1967.
- Los Straitjackets on the album Play Favorites, 2004.
- Argentine alternative band La Portuaria on their EP Hasta Despertar, 2002.
- Argentine alternative band Juana la loca on their 1998 album Planeta (Lados B).
- André Toussaint

== In popular culture ==
- The song was included in the soundtrack of the 1942 film Casablanca, in a scene set in a Paris nightclub where Humphrey Bogart and Ingrid Bergman dance together.
- "Perfidia" is the title to a chapter of Nora Johnson's 1986 novel Tender Offer. The song highlights the theme of the story's zenith and the actual song is described being played during a crucial scene.
- Perfidia is the title of a 1997 novel by Judith Rossner. The song lyrics are quoted several times in the narrative.
- Linda Ronstadt's version of the song in English with a Spanish introduction was used in the 1992 film The Mambo Kings. Ronstadt also recorded the song in Spanish for her 1992 album Frenesí. At the 9th Lo Nuestro Awards, her version received a nomination for Tropical Song of the Year.
- The novel Perfidia, from James Ellroy, is named after the song.
- An instrumental recording by Mambo All-Stars was frequently used in the American series Dexter.
- The 2025 film One Battle After Another features a character named "Perfidia Beverly Hills". Her analogue in the 1990 novel Vineland, from which the film is loosely adapted, is named "Frenesi" after another Domínguez song of the same name.
- The tune is heard in the 2024 film The Outrun, which featured Saoirse Ronan.
