= Mariachi los Camperos =

American mariachi band

Mariachi los Camperos de Nati Cano is a Grammy Award-winning Los Angeles–based mariachi ensemble which was formerly led by Natividad "Nati" Cano.

== History ==
In 1950, Nati Cano joined a mariachi band in the city of Mexicali, Baja California, as an arranger. Cano was younger than any of the other members at the time. The group later relocated to Los Angeles, California, based out of a restaurant Nati founded as well, named "La Fonda de Los Camperos." Cano renamed the band, Mariachi los Camperos, meaning Countrymen.

Since the group's founding in 1961, they have performed in numerous venues throughout the United States and Mexico including Lincoln Center, the Kennedy Center, Walt Disney Concert Hall, and the Getty Center. In 1964, they were the first mariachi ensemble to perform in Carnegie Hall.

The ensemble was one of four mariachis that collaborated on Linda Ronstadt’s 1987 milestone album, Canciones de Mi Padre. They also appear on Ronstadt’s sequel album, Mas Canciones, which was released in 1992, and toured with the singer nationwide.

== Members ==
Nati Cano died October 3, 2014, due to declining health, passing on the group to the current musical director, Jesus "Chuy" Guzman. He has arranged songs for the group since 1992, leads the Mariachi Master Apprentice Program (MMAP) in San Fernando Valley, and teaches at the UCLA Herb Alpert School of Music.

Cuco Del Cid died in January 2018.

Former member Martin C. Padilla from El Paso, Texas, also died in January 2019.

Members:

- Violin: Jesús Guzmán (director), Raul Cuellar, Ernesto Lázaro, Ismael Hernández
- Trumpet: Javier Rodríguez
- Guitar: Jonathan Palomar
- Guitarrón: Juan Jiménez
- Harp: Sergio Alonso

.

=== Current members (2025) ===
- Jesús “Chuy” Guzmán – Director, Violin, Vocals
- Raúl Cuéllar – Violin
- Alfredo Gómez – Violin
- Antonio Guzmán – Violin
- Ramón Piña – Violin
- Moisés Vázquez – Violin
- Brandon González – Trumpet
- Jesús Becerra – Trumpet
- Ali Pizarro – Guitar
- Mario Hernández – Vihuela
- Nathan García – Guitarrón
- Sergio Alonso – Harp

== Discography ==
- Puro Mariachi (Indigo Records, 1961)
- North of the Border (RCA/Carino Records, 1965)
- El Super Mariachi, Los Camperos (Latin International, 1968)
- Valses de Amor (La Fonda Records, 1973)
- Canciones de Siempre (PolyGram Latino, 1993)
- Sounds of Mariachi (Delfin Records, 1996)
- Fiesta Navidad (Delfin Records, 1997)
- Viva el Mariachi (Smithsonian Folkways, 2003)
- ¡Llegaron Los Camperos!, (Smithsonian Folkways Recordings, 2004): nominated for the 2006 Grammy Award for Best Mexican/Mexican-American Album.
- Amor, Dolor y Lagrimas: Música Ranchera (Smithsonian Folkways Recordings, 2008): 2008 Grammy Award for Best Regional Mexican Album.
- Tradición, Arte y Pasión: Mariachi Los Camperos de Nati Cano (Smithsonian Folkways Recordings, 2015): nominated for the 2015 Grammy Award for Best Regional Mexican Album.
- De Ayer Para Siempre (2019): De Ayer Para Siempre is nominated for the 2020 Grammy Award for Best Regional Mexican Music Album (Including Tejano)

They were also featured on Smithsonian Folkways' Raíces Latinas: Smithsonian Folkways Latino Roots Collection in 2002.

== Awards ==
Grammy Awards

Year	Recipient	Award	Result	Ref
2006	¡Llegaron Los Camperos!	Best Mexican/Mexican-American Album.	Nominated	
2009	Amor, Dolor Y Lágrimas: Música Ranchera	Best Regional Mexican Album	Won	
2016	Tradición, Arte Y Pasión	Best Regional Mexican Music Album (Including Tejano)	Nominated	
2020	De Ayer Para Siempre	Best Regional Mexican Music Album (Including Tejano)	Won	

They shared a 2005 Best Musical Album for Children Grammy for cellabration!, A tribute to Ella Jenkins.
