= Thomas L. Hayes Jr. =

United States Air Force general

Thomas Lloyd Hayes Jr.
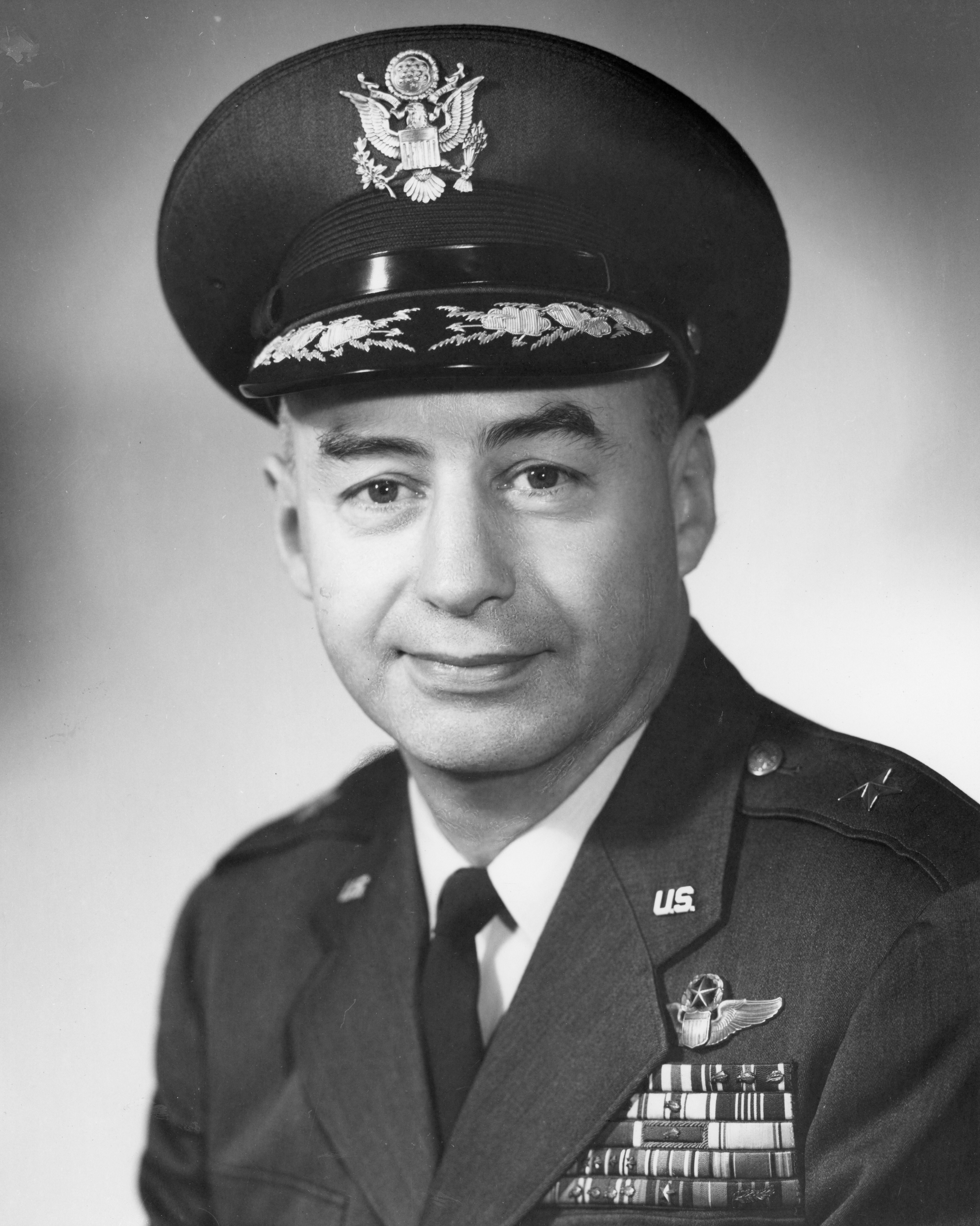
- Born: March 31, 1917; Portland, Oregon, U.S.
- Died: July 24, 2008 (aged 91); Reston, Virginia, U.S.
- Burial place: Arlington National Cemetery
- Military career
- Allegiance: United States
- Branch: United States Air Force
- Service years: 1940–1970
- Rank: Brigadier General
- Nickname: "Tommy"
- Units: 35th Fighter Group; 357th Fighter Group
- Commands: 364th Fighter Squadron; 3010th Army Air Force Base Unit; Minot Air Defense Sector; 65th Air Division; 86th Air Division
- Conflicts: World War II
- Awards: Silver Star; Legion of Merit; Distinguished Flying Cross (4); Purple Heart; Air Medal (7)

Thomas Lloyd Hayes Jr. (March 31, 1917 - July 24, 2008) was a United States Army Air Forces flying ace during the World War II. He accrued 8.5 victories in the war.

He retired from the United States Air Force in 1970 at the rank of brigadier general.

== Early life ==
Hayes was born on March 31, 1917, in Portland. His interest in aviation developed after he witnessed the arrival of a Soviet Tupolev ANT-25 piloted by Valery Chkalov at Pearson Army Airfield in Vancouver, Washington, while on its way to San Francisco during its 5200-mile journey from Moscow. Hayes saw the airplane and its crew, and had his picture taken next to the aircraft.

== Military career ==
Hayes attempted to become a naval aviator in the United States Navy, but was rejected due to his then young age and lack of college degree. He attended the University of Oregon until May 1940, after he found out that the United States Army Air Corps was accepting recruits of young age and with no college degree.

He enlisted in the Aviation Cadet Program on June 19, 1940, and was commissioned a second lieutenant in the U.S. Army Air Corps and awarded his pilot wings at Kelly Field in Texas, on February 7, 1941.

=== World War II ===
Following his completion of flight training, Hayes was assigned to the 70th Pursuit Squadron of the 35th Pursuit Group at Hamilton Field in California in February 1941. Flying Curtiss P-36 Hawks, he served with the unit until December 1941, when he assigned as a P-40 Warhawk pilot with the 17th Pursuit Squadron of the 24th Pursuit Group in Java, Dutch East Indies and flew combat missions during the Dutch East Indies Campaign.

On February 20, 1942, Hayes took part in a bomber escort of A-20 Havocs and LB-30 Liberators on a bombing mission against Japanese ships off Bali. After the formation reached over south of Bali, they were intercepted by Japanese A6M Zeroes. During the dogfight, Hayes's P-40 was attacked and damaged by the Zeros. As a result, his aircraft suffered a damaged elevator and jammed canopy. He managed to fly his aircraft back to Negro Airfield in eastern Java, but crash landed. A member of his squadron at the airfield helped him out of the wreckage.

After recovering from his injuries from the crash landing, Hayes was transferred to the 35th Fighter Group in New Guinea in March 1942, where he served as a P-39 Airacobra pilot. On August 25, 1942, he flew a mission against the Japanese airfield in Buna. Despite heavy tropical rain and very limited visibility, Hayes led his flight in an attack run which destroyed eight to ten enemy planes on the ground, a gasoline dump and a heavy calibre machine gun position.

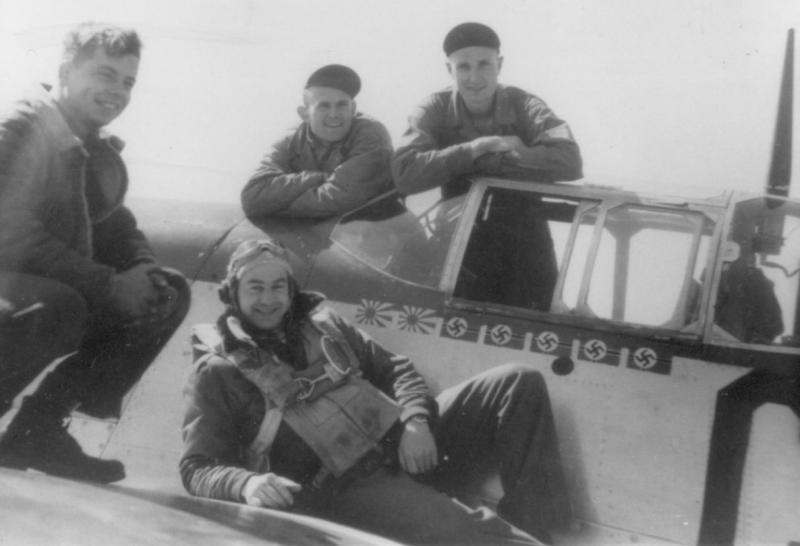
Hayes relaxes on the wing of his P-51 Mustang, while being surrounded by his aircraft's crew chiefs.

He flew missions in the Pacific until he returned to the United States in October 1942. In December 1942, he was assigned as a flight instructor with the 328th Fighter Group in Hamilton Field and in May 1943, he was appointed as commander of the 364th Fighter Squadron of the 357th Fighter Group at airfields in California and Wyoming. In December 1943, the group was deployed to England, where it was stationed at RAF Raydon and received the P-51 Mustangs. The group was assigned to Ninth Air Force as a P-51 tactical air support unit, before it was transferred to 66th Fighter Wing in the Eighth Air Force and moved to RAF Leiston.

In January 1944, the 364th FS began flying combat missions and on February 24, 1944, he accrued a probable aerial victory of shooting down a Messerschmitt Bf 109 over Gotha. In March 1944, Hayes was assigned as deputy commander of the 357th Fighter Group and scored his confirmed first aerial victory when he shot down a Bf 109 over Frankfurt on March 2, 1944. On March 6, the 357th FG took part in a bomber escort of B-24 Liberators to Berlin. After the group commander aborted from the mission, Hayes took over as the flight leader for the mission. During the mission, the flight encountered a flight of Bf 109s and as a result, they engaged in dogfights from treetop level to 26,000 feet. Hayes shot down a Bf 109 at low level near Uelzen. He then led other P-51s in strafing an airfield, where they damaged aircraft, control tower and a locomotive. The flight claimed 20 enemy aircraft destroyed, with no losses.

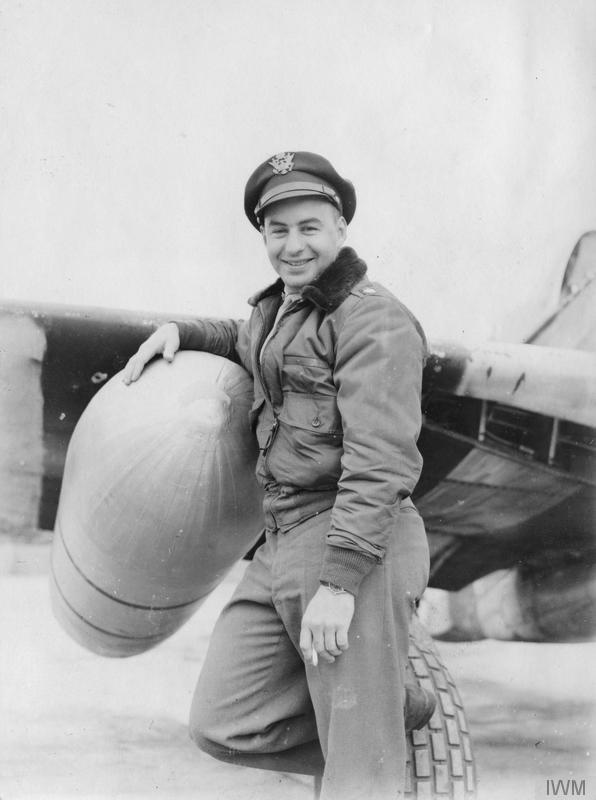
Hayes standing with his P-51 Mustang

Hayes scored his third and fourth aerial victories on March 8 and 16 respectively. He became the first flying ace of the 357th FG on April 19, when he shot down a Bf 109 over Kassel, his fifth aerial victory. Hayes shot down a Bf 109 on 28 May, his sixth aerial victory. On D-Day, the 357th FG flew eight missions and nearly 130 sorties, and, thereafter, multiple daily missions over the beachhead. Hayes scored seventh, shared and eighth aerial victories, on June 29 and July 14, 1944, respectively. On July 25, 1944, he led 54 357th FG P-51s on a fighter sweep over France in conjunction with Operation Cobra, the American carpet bombing of German positions in the vicinity of St. Lo. Over the outskirts of Paris, they spotted 25 or more Bf 109s and Focke-Wulf Fw 190s attacking a flight of P-38 Lightnings. Hayes ordered the 362nd and 363rd FS to attack the German fighters, while he and his 364th FS provided top cover for the attacking P-51s. In the ensuing combat, Hayes' flight destroyed five Bf 109s and damaged a sixth, with no losses from their side. He returned to the United States in August 1944.

During World War II, Hayes was credited with the destruction of 8.5 enemy aircraft in aerial combat plus 1 probable and 1 shared destruction in missions over Europe. He was also credited with 2 enemy aircraft destroyed on the ground while strafing an enemy airfield in the Pacific. While serving with the 357th FG, he flew an unnamed P-51B and a P-51D bearing the name "Frenesi", a popular song composed by Alberto Domínguez Borrás. Hayes stated it was a tribute to his wife Louise, for the song they listened to; he believed the song's name translated as "Love Me Tenderly".

After his return of the United States, he served as the deputy training and operations officer, and later as the director of training and operations, air inspector, deputy base commander, and then assistant commandant of the 3028th Army Air Force Base Unit at Luke Field in Arizona from August 1944 to November 1946.

=== Post war ===
Following the end of World War II, Hayes served as the commander of the 3010th Army Air Force Base Unit at Williams Field in Arizona, from December 1946 to July 1947. From August 1947 to September 1948, he completed his bachelor's degree at the University of Oregon following an assignment by the Air Force Institute of Technology to do so.

From September 1948 to November 1951, he served as a planning officer with the Plans Division at Headquarters U.S. Air Force in the Pentagon. Hayes attended NATO Defense College from December 1951 to May 1952 and served as the Air Member with the Combined Exercise Planning Department with NATO from June 1952 to June 1955. He served as the assistant deputy for operations and assistant deputy chief of staff for operations with Headquarters Western Air Defense Force at Hamilton Air Force Base, from July 1955 to September 1958. He was appointed as deputy chief of staff for operations with Headquarters 28th Air Division at Hamilton AFB from September 1958 to October 1959.

Hayes served as chief of the Plans Division and acting director of Plans and Policies with Headquarters NORAD at Ent Air Force Base in Colorado, from October 1959 to July 1962, and as commander of the Minot Air Defense Sector at Minot Air Force Base in North Dakota, from July 1962 to July 1963. He served as vice commander and then commander of the 65th Air Division at Torrejon Air Base in Spain, from July 1963 to July 1964, and then as commander of the 86th Air Division at Ramstein Air Base in West Germany, from July 1964 to January 1966.

His final assignment was as deputy commander for resources and management with the Military Management and Terminal Service at the Pentagon from July 1966 until his retirement from the Air Force on February 1, 1970.

== Later life ==
Hayes was married to Margaret Louise Hayes, with whom he had five daughters, and several grand and great-grandchildren. His daughter Suzanne predeceased him in 2004.

He died on July 24, 2008, at the age of 91 in Reston Hospital Center, due to complications from Alzheimer's disease. He was buried at Arlington National Cemetery.

== Aerial victory credits ==
Date	#	Type	Location	Aircraft flown	Unit Assigned
March 2, 1944	1	Messerschmitt Bf 109	Frankfurt, Germany	P-51B Mustang	364 FS, 357 FG
March 6, 1944	1	Bf 109	Uelzen, Germany	P-51B	364 FS, 357 FG
March 8, 1944	1	Messerschmitt Me 410	Berlin, Germany	P-51B	364 FS, 357 FG
March 16, 1944	1	Messerschmitt Bf 110	Stuttgart, Germany	P-51B	364 FS, 357 FG
April 19, 1944	1	Bf 109	Kassel, Germany	P-51B	364 FS, 357 FG
May 28, 1944	1	Bf 109	Magdeburg, Germany	P-51B	364 FS, 357 FG
June 29, 1944	1	Bf 109	Naumburg, Germany	P-51D Mustang	357 FG HQ
June 29, 1944	0.5	Me 410	Leipzig, Germany	P-51D	357 FG HQ
July 14, 1944	1	Bf 109	Valence, France	P-51D	357 FG HQ

SOURCE: Air Force Historical Study 85: USAF Credits for the Destruction of Enemy Aircraft, World War II

== Awards and decorations ==
His awards include:

USAF Command pilot badge
Silver Star
Legion of Merit
Distinguished Flying Cross with three bronze oak leaf clusters
Purple Heart
Air Medal with silver and bronze oak leaf clusters
Air Force Commendation Medal with two bronze oak leaf clusters
Army Commendation Medal
Air Force Presidential Unit Citation with three bronze oak leaf clusters
Air Force Outstanding Unit Award
American Defense Service Medal
American Campaign Medal
Asiatic-Pacific Campaign Medal with three bronze campaign stars
European-African-Middle Eastern Campaign Medal with four bronze campaign stars
World War II Victory Medal
National Defense Service Medal with service star
Air Force Longevity Service Award with silver and bronze oak leaf clusters
Small Arms Expert Marksmanship Ribbon
French Croix de Guerre with Silver-Gilt star
French Croix de Guerre with Palm

=== Silver Star citation ===
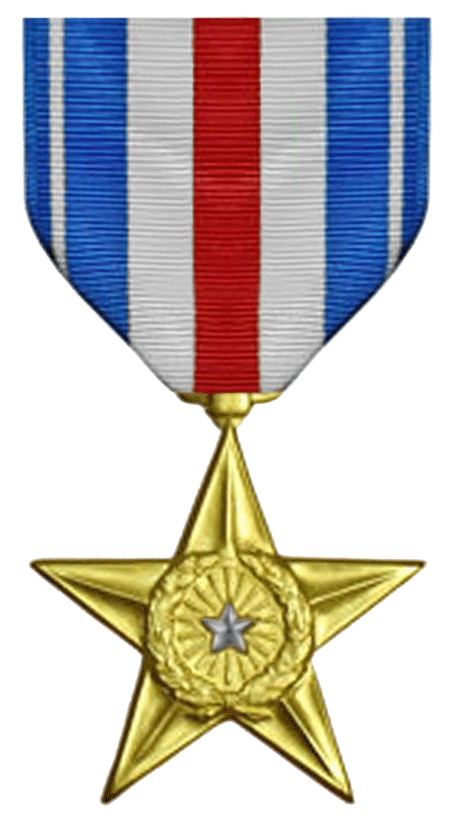

Hayes, Thomas L.
First Lieutenant (Air Corps), U.S. Army Air Forces
35th Fighter Group, 5th Air Force
Date of Action: August 25, 1942

Citation:

The President of the United States of America, authorized by Act of Congress July 9, 1918, takes pleasure in presenting the Silver Star to First Lieutenant (Air Corps) Thomas Lloyd Hayes, Jr., United States Army Air Forces, for gallantry in action while serving as a Pilot of the 35th Fighter Group, Fifth Air Force, in action over Buna, New Guinea, on 25 August 1942. Through a combination of heavy tropical rain and very limited visibility, Lieutenant Hayes skillfully piloted his P-400 type aircraft into position so that on the bombing run direct hits were scored and eight to ten enemy planes were destroyed on the ground, a gasoline dump went up in flames, and a heavy caliber machine gun position was silenced. This very successful raid was accomplished against the Japanese at Buna. It was the second trip over the mountainous and jungle terrain to the target area that day for Lieutenant Hayes. On the first flight adverse weather prevented the formation from locating the enemy. Courage and determination were displayed by Lieutenant Hayes in undertaking a second hazardous mission immediately after the first flight returned to home base.
