= Nati Cano =

Mexican-American mariachi musician and bandleader

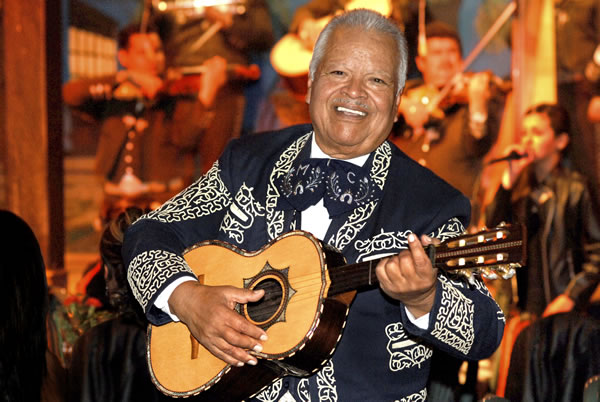
- Cano in 1990

Background information
- Born: Natividad Cano; June 23, 1933; Ahuisculco, Jalisco, Mexico
- Died: October 3, 2014 (aged 81) Fillmore, California, U.S.
- Genres: Mariachi
- Occupations: Musician, bandleader, composer, arranger
- Instruments: Mexican vihuela, violin
- Years active: 1950–2014
- Formerly of: Mariachi los Camperos

Natividad "Nati" Cano (June 23, 1933 – October 3, 2014) was a Mexican-born American mariachi musician and former, longtime leader of Mariachi los Camperos, a Grammy-winning mariachi band based in Los Angeles. According to the Los Angeles Times, Mariachi los Camperos is "widely considered one of the top mariachi ensembles in the country". In 1990, Cano was awarded a National Heritage Fellowship by the National Endowment for the Arts, which is the United States government's highest honor in the folk and traditional arts.

== Early life ==
Natividad Cano was born in the village of Ahuisculco, Jalisco, Mexico, on June 23, 1933. This is the area of Mexico where the mariachi tradition originated. His family members worked as day laborers, but they also played mariachi during their spare time. Cano's grandfather Catarino was a self-taught guitarron player, and his father Sotero was a musician who played all of the mariachi stringed instruments. In 1939, at age six, Nati was taught to play the Mexican vihuela. Two years later, Nati enrolled in the Academia de Musica in Guadalajara, where he studied the violin for six years.

== Career ==
Cano traveled to the northern city of Mexicali in 1950, where he joined the Mariachi Chapala and quickly became its arranger, although he was ten years younger than most of the band members. He immigrated to Los Angeles, California in 1960, and joined the Mariachi Águila. The then-leader of that band, Jose Frias, was killed in a traffic accident. Cano took over the band as its leader and renamed it Mariachi los Camperos, meaning "Countrymen". The band has played across the United States, including such landmarks as Carnegie Hall, Disney Hall, Lincoln Center, the Kennedy Center, and the Orange County Performing Arts Center. Under Cano, Mariachi los Camperos performed with singer Linda Ronstadt on her 1987 album, Canciones de Mi Padre, and its sequel, Mas Canciones, released in 1992. Mariachi los Camperos won a Grammy Award for Best Regional Mexican Album for their 2008 album, Amor, Dolor Y Lágrimas.

In 1969, Cano opened a restaurant, La Fonda, located on Wilshire Boulevard. He had vowed to one day own his own restaurant after being refused service at an eatery in Texas. La Fonda closed in 2007, but reopened with Los Camperos in March 2016.

Starting in the 1980s, Cano focused on mentoring young people in the mariachi tradition. For close to thirty years, he led workshops for youth across the American Southwest. Cano taught and lectured on ethnomusicology at University of California, Los Angeles. He stepped down as leader of Mariachi los Camperos in the 2000s due to declining health, but continued to perform with the group.

== Death ==
Cano died from colon cancer at his home in Fillmore, California, on October 3, 2014, at the age of 81. He was survived by his wife, Andrea, and two daughters, Alejandra and Natalie.

== Awards and honors ==
- 1990 National Heritage Fellowship
- 2006 Grammy Award nomination for Best Mexican/Mexican-American Album for ¡Llegaron Los Camperos! Concert Favorites Of Nati Cano's Mariachi Los Camperos
- 2009 Grammy Award win for Best Regional Mexican Album for Amor, Dolor Y Lágrimas: Música Ranchera (Mariachi los Camperos)
- 2016 Grammy Award nomination for Best Regional Mexican Music Album (including Tejano) for Tradición, Arte Y Pasión (Mariachi los Camperos)
