= Ray Santos =

American musician (1928–2019)

- Born: Raymond Santos; December 28, 1928; East Harlem, New York, US
- Died: October 17, 2019 (aged 90) The Bronx, New York, US
- Genres: Latin jazz; Salsa; Mambo; big band
- Occupations: musician, composer, and educator
- Instrument: saxophone
- Years active: 1950s–2019

Raymond Santos (December 28, 1928 – October 17, 2019) was an American Grammy Award-winning Latin musician, composer, and educator. Santos has played and arranged for such artists as Noro Morales, Machito, Tito Rodriguez, Eddie Palmieri, and Tito Puente among many others. He was nicknamed El Maestro.

== Early life and education ==
Ray Santos was born in East Harlem in New York on December 28, 1928. His mother was a doll maker and his father was a doorman. They were born in Puerto Rico. When Santos was thirteen, the family moved to The Bronx. As a child, Santos heard Machito and his Afro-Cuban boys and Charlie Parker's music, which inspired him to pursue a career in music. He played tenor sax while in high school at Haaren High School. Santos attended Juilliard School and graduated in 1952.

== Career ==
Santos started his career in music playing Latin-inspired big band music in the 1950s. He played with bands in the Catskills and at the Palladium in New York City.

Santos served as music consultant and arranger for the soundtrack of the motion picture The Mambo Kings. He arranged the Oscar-nominated song Beautiful Maria of My Soul. He arranged and directed the orchestra for Linda Ronstadt's Frenesí album, for which he won a Grammy.

He was inducted into the International Latin Music Hall of Fame in 2003 and received the Latin Grammy Trustees Award in 2011.

Santos taught at the City College of New York for over 20 years, directing the Latin Band. He retired from City College in December 2013 at the age of 84.

In 2016, Santos received an honorary doctorate of music from Berklee College of Music.

Santos arranged Jon Secada's album To Beny Moré With Love. In 2018, Santos contributed arrangements to Eddie Palmieri's Mi Luz Mayor album.

He died on October 17, 2019, at age 90.
