= Canciones de Mi Padre =

Canciones de mi padre

Studio album by Linda Ronstadt
- Released: November 24, 1987
- Recorded: 1987
- Studios: The Complex (Los Angeles, California)
- Genres: Mariachi; ranchera; Latin; Mexican
- Length: 39:41
- Labels: Elektra/Asylum Records, Rhino
- Producers: Peter Asher; Ruben Fuentes

Linda Ronstadt chronology
Trio (1987)	Canciones de mi padre (1987)	Cry Like a Rainstorm, Howl Like the Wind (1989)

Professional ratings
Review scores
Source	Rating
AllMusic	3/5 stars
Rolling Stone	2/5 stars

Canciones de mi padre (Spanish for Songs of My Father, or My Father's Songs) is American singer Linda Ronstadt's first album of Mexican traditional Mariachi music.

== History ==
The album was released in late 1987 and immediately became a global smash hit. At 2½ million US sales, it stands as the biggest selling non-English language album in American record history. This album has been RIAA certified double-platinum (for over 2 million US copies sold) and also won Ronstadt the Grammy Award for Best Mexican/Mexican-American Album at the 31st Grammy Awards.

These canciones were a big part of Ronstadt's family tradition and musical roots. The title Canciones de Mi Padre refers to a booklet that the University of Arizona published in 1946 for Ronstadt's deceased aunt, Luisa Espinel, who had been an international singer in the 1920s. Also, Ronstadt has credited the late Mexican singer Lola Beltrán as an influence in her own singing style, and she recalls how a frequent guest to the Ronstadt home, Eduardo "Lalo" Guerrero, father of Chicano music, would often serenade her as child with these songs.

In the accompanying printed material, each song's Spanish lyrics were paired with an English translation and a discussion of the song's background or its significance for Ronstadt (omitted on the CD). Rubén Fuentes served as musical director/bandleader. Follow-up albums include Mas Canciones, Frenesí, and the Rhino Records compilation Mi Jardin Azul: Las Canciones Favoritas, which collects songs from the previous three Spanish-language albums. Canciones de mi Padre also is the only recording production in the world that used the three best Mariachi bands in the world: Mariachi Vargas, Mariachi Los Camperos and Mariachi Los Galleros de Pedro Rey. As of 2012, Canciones de Mi Padre had sold nearly 10 million copies worldwide.

Although sometimes referred to as Ronstadt's first Spanish-language recordings, in fact she had recorded several times in the language before, including "Lo Siento mi Vida", a song she co-wrote with her father for her 1976 album, Hasten Down the Wind, and "Lago Azul," a Spanish translation of "Blue Bayou", that was released as a single following her hit English version from her 1977 album, Simple Dreams.

In 2021, it was announced that Canciones de Mi Padre had been inducted into the Grammy Hall of Fame.

In 2022, the album was selected by the Library of Congress for preservation in the National Recording Registry.

== Track listing ==
No.	Title	Writer(s)	Length
1.	"Por Un Amor"	Gilberto Parra	2:56
2.	"Los Laureles"	José López	2:25
3.	"Hay Unos Ojos"	Rubén Fuentes	2:45
4.	"La Cigarra"	Ray Pérez y Soto	3:45
5.	"Tú Sólo Tú"	Felipe Valdez Leal	3:09
6.	"Y Ándale"	Minerva Elizondo	2:32
7.	"Rogaciano El Huapanguero"	Valeriano Trejo	3:00
8.	"La Charreada"	Felipe Bermejo	3:49
9.	"Dos Arbolitos"	Chucho Martínez Gil	2:34
10.	"Corrido De Cananea"	Rubén Fuentes	3:24
11.	"La Barca De Guaymas"	Rubén Fuentes	3:25
12.	"La Calandria"	Nicandro Castillo	3:00
13.	"El Sol Que Tú Eres"	traditional, arr Daniel Valdez	2:57
Total length:			39:41

== Personnel ==
- Linda Ronstadt – vocals, harmony vocals (10)
- Pedro Rey – harmony vocals (5, 10, 11)
- Melinda Marie Ronstadt – harmony vocals (6)
- Michael J. Ronstadt – harmony vocals (7, 9, 12)
- Pete Ronstadt – harmony vocals (7, 9, 12)
- Juan Rey – harmony vocals (10)
- Heriberto Molina – harmony vocals (11)
- Daniel Valdez – vocals (13)
- Ricardo Cisneros, Héctor Gama, Jesus Guzman, Heriberto Molina, Armando Javier Pérez, Felipe Perez, Mario Rodriguez, Ramón Rodriguez and Nati Santiago – chorus

Musicians

- Ruben Fuentes – arrangements and conductor
- Samuel Gutiérrez – guitars
- Humberto Hernández – guitars
- Jésus Hernández – guitars
- José Hernández – guitars, vihuela, trumpet
- Jorge Lopez – guitars
- Rafael Palomar – guitars
- Gilberto Puente – guitar solos
- Daniel Valdez – guitar (13)
- Jamie Alejo – guitarrón
- José María Arellano – guitarrón
- Nati Santiago – guitarrón
- Victor "El Pato" Cardenas – vihuela
- Luis Damian – vihuela
- Pedro Flores – vihuela
- Pedro Rey – vihuela
- Larry Bunker – percussion
- Ron Kalina – harmonica
- Steve Fowler – flute
- Laura Halladay – flute
- Juan Gudiño – trumpet
- Luis Salinas – trumpet
- Federico Torres – trumpet
- Jim Self – tuba
- Arthur Gerst – harp
- Juan Jose Almaguer – violin
- Juan Manuel Biurquiz – violin
- Nati Cano – violin
- Héctor Gama – violin
- Pepe Martínez – violin
- Felipe Perez – violin
- Antonio Ramos – violin
- Mario Rodriguez – violin
- Felipe Romero – violin
- Salvador Torres – violin

=== Production ===
- Peter Asher – producer
- Ruben Fuentes – producer
- Shawn Murphy – recording, mixing
- Sharon Rice – recording assistant, mix assistant
- Dwayne Seykora – recording assistant, mix assistant
- Doug Sax – mastering at The Mastering Lab (Hollywood, California)
- José Hernández – album coordinator, musical assistance
- John Kosh – art direction, design
- Bob Blakeman – photography
- Gilbert Ronstadt – back cover painting
- J. Roy Helland – make-up, hair stylist
- Manuel – wardrobe design
- Edd Kolakowski – assistant to Peter Asher
- Janet Stark – assistant to Miss Ronstadt

== Charts ==
Chart (1987/88)	Peak position
Canadian RPM Top Albums	54
United States (Billboard 200)	42

== Sales and certifications ==
Region	Certification	Certified units/sales
United States (RIAA)	2× Platinum	2,500,000

== Release history ==
Release history and formats for Canciones de Mi Padre
Region	Date	Format	Label	Ref.
North America	November 13, 1987	LP; CD; cassette	Asylum Records	

== See also ==
- List of best-selling Latin albums
