= Mas Canciones =

Studio album by Linda Ronstadt
- Released: November 19, 1991
- Recorded: 1991
- Studios: Skywalker Sound and The Site (Marin County, California)
- Genres: Mariachi, Latin, Mexican
- Length: 40:40
- Labels: Elektra, Rhino
- Producer: George Massenburg: Rubén Fuentes

Linda Ronstadt chronology
Cry Like a Rainstorm, Howl Like the Wind (1989)	Mas Canciones (1991)	Frenesí (1992)

Mas Canciones (correct form: Más canciones; Spanish for "more songs") is an album by American singer/songwriter/producer Linda Ronstadt, released in late 1991.

A significant hit in the U.S. for a non-English language album, it peaked at number 88 on the Billboard album chart, and reached number 16 on the Top Latin Albums chart. It won the Grammy Award for Best Mexican/Mexican-American Album, Ronstadt's second win in this category. The single "Grítenme Piedras del Campo" peaked at number 15 on the Hot Latin Tracks chart.

In 2016, this album was reissued on the Rhino label after several years out of print.

== History ==
Mas Canciones was released four years after the release of Ronstadt's Double Platinum-certified, first Spanish-language album, Canciones de Mi Padre.

"The reason I did it is selfish," Ronstadt said in an interview. "I had started to make a record in English, but I didn't like it and put it away. I found myself sleeping and dreaming in Spanish, and these songs were driving me crazy. I kept waking up in the middle of the night thinking that the musicians who know this music are old, and if they go I won't have anybody to help me do it. I didn't dare put it off another minute."

The album, according to Ronstadt, "concentrated more on trio and ensemble singing than did its predecessor." For the vocal trios, Ronstandt was joined by her two brothers, Pete and Mike. Pete Ronstadt at the time was the chief of police in Tucson, Arizona, where Mike owned a hardware store. Except for the professional guitar-playing, Ronstadt said, the arrangements are the same as those they sang in the living room when they were growing up.

Mas Canciones won Linda the 1993 Grammy Award for Best Mexican/Mexican-American Album.

== Reception ==
Professional ratings
Review scores
Source	Rating
AllMusic	3/5 stars
Chicago Tribune	3/4 stars
Entertainment Weekly	B
Rolling Stone	2/5 stars

In his AllMusic review, critic Stephen Thomas Erlewine called the album a "thoroughly enjoyable collection of Spanish and Mexican songs that is arguably stronger than its predecessor, since Ronstadt sounds more comfortable with the material than ever before."

== Track listing ==
No.	Title	Writer(s)	Length
1.	"Tata Dios"	Valeriano Trejo	4:19
2.	"El Toro Relajo"	Felipe Bermejo	2:32
3.	"Mi Ranchito"	Felipe Valdés Leal	3:33
4.	"La Mariquita"	Rubén Fuentes	2:59
5.	"Grítenme Piedras del Campo"	Cuco Sánchez	3:27
6.	"Siempre Hace Frío"	Cuco Sánchez	3:18
7.	"El Crucifijo de Piedra"	Roberto Cantoral	3:16
8.	"Palomita de Ojos Negros"	Tomás Méndez	3:30
9.	"Pena de los Amores"	José Luis Almada	4:00
10.	"El Camino"	Jesús Navarro, Jr.	3:29
11.	"El Gustito"	Elpidio Ramírez	2:36
12.	"El Sueño"	Nicandro Castillo	3:41
Total length:			40:40

== Personnel ==
- Linda Ronstadt – vocals
- Linda Ronstadt, Michael J. Ronstadt and Pete Ronstadt – trio voices (4, 10, 12)
- Juan José Almaguer, Jesús Guzmán, Santiago Maldonado, José Martínez, Juan Morales and Rafael Palomar – chorus

Musicians

- Rubén Fuentes – arrangements and conductor
- Flaco Jiménez – accordion (8)
- Leonel Gálvez – guitars
- Rafael Palomar – guitars
- Gilberto Puente – guitars
- Raúl Puente – guitars
- Enrique de Santiago – guitarrón
- Víctor "El Pato" Cárdenas – vihuela
- Angela Koregelos – flute (1, 11)
- Katheryn McElrath – flute (1, 11)
- Martin Lara – trumpet
- Federico Torres – first trumpet
- Santiago Maldonado – harp
- Juan José Almaguer – violin
- Nati Cano – violin
- Pedro García – violin
- Monica Treviño - violin
- Jesús Guzmán – violin
- José Martínez, Jr. – first violin
- Mario Rodríguez – violin

=== Production ===
- Rubén Fuentes – producer
- George Massenburg – producer, recording, mixing
- Nathaniel Kunkel – recording
- Kevin Scott – recording assistant
- Craig Silvey – recording assistant
- M.T. Silvia – recording assistant
- Doug Sax – mastering
- Alan Yoshida – mastering
- The Mastering Lab (Hollywood, California) – mastering location
- Ivy Skoff – production coordinator
- Janet Stark – production coordinator
- John Kosh – art direction, design
- Gilbert Ronstadt – artwork, painting
- William Coupon – photography
- Rossy Corsly – translation
- Mercedes Dalton – translation
- Linda Ronstadt – translation

== Charts ==
Chart (1991)	Peak position
Australian Albums (ARIA)	183
United States (Billboard 200)	88

== Release history ==
Release history and formats for Mas Canciones
Region	Date	Format	Label	Ref.
North America	November 19, 1991	CD; cassette	Elektra Records	
