= Frenesí =

Single by Artie Shaw and His Orchestra
- A-side: "Adiós Mariquita Linda"
- Published: December 28, 1939 by Southern Music Pub. Co., Inc., New York
- Released: March 29, 1940
- Recorded: March 3, 1940
- Studio: Victor Studios, Hollywood
- Genre: Swing
- Length: 3:01
- Label: Victor 26542
- Composer: Alberto Domínguez Borrás
- Lyricist: Leonard Whitcup (1st English version)

"Frenesí" (Spanish for 'frenzy') is a 1939 musical piece with music composed by Alberto Domínguez Borrás for the marimba. The first recordings of the song, released in 1939, were by the Mexican singer Lupita Palomera (Victor 76161), who was accompanied by the composer's own band, Orquesta De Los Hermanos Domínguez, and by the Mexican singer and actor Ramón Armengod (Decca 21035). No separate credit for the original Spanish language lyrics appear on the 1939 recordings by Armengod and Palomera or in original sheet music publications, which credit Domínguez for music and Spanish lyrics. Some sources including Gran Cancionero Mexicano (2005) and Bolero: Clave del Corazón (2004) cite Rodolfo “Chamaco” Sandoval as the co-author.

U.S. swing bandleader Artie Shaw recorded an instrumental version that topped the U.S. popular music charts in December, 1940, and helped the song become a jazz standard.

== English Language versions ==
The first English language version was published as a standalone piano and vocal sheet music edition in 1939 by Southern Music Publishing Company, with a lyric by Leonard Whitcup. Among the few vocal recordings made in the early 1940s with Whitcup's original lyric were those by Woody Herman (U.S. Decca 3427) and Harry's Tavern Band (Bluebird 10811).

Whitcup was an ASCAP member, which presented a problem for Southern Music when the 1941 ASCAP boycott went into effect and U.S. radio networks refused to play music licensed by ASCAP. The boycott, which began on Jan. 1, 1941, started just after the instrumental hit by Artie Shaw and several other competing cover versions were becoming popular in late 1940. Southern Music commissioned a BMI-licensed revision of Whitcup's lyric by S.K. (Bob) Russell and conductor and songwriter Ray Charles (not to be confused with the U.S. rhythm and blues singer of the same name). Whitcup's name was removed from the new publication, and the song was re-copyrighted and re-published by Southern Music in a piano/vocal sheet music edition that retained the 1939 publication date of the original and included only the revised lyric. Russell & Charles' names were appearing on recordings of the song as early as February, 1941, when Glenn Miller released an instrumental version (Bluebird B-10994) featuring the new songwriting credits.

The lyrics can be distinguished by the first line of the verses, with the Whitcup lyric beginning "Long, long ago / A lover came down to Old Mexico," and the Russell/Charles lyric beginning "Sometime ago / I wondered down into Old Mexico."

== Artie Shaw recording ==
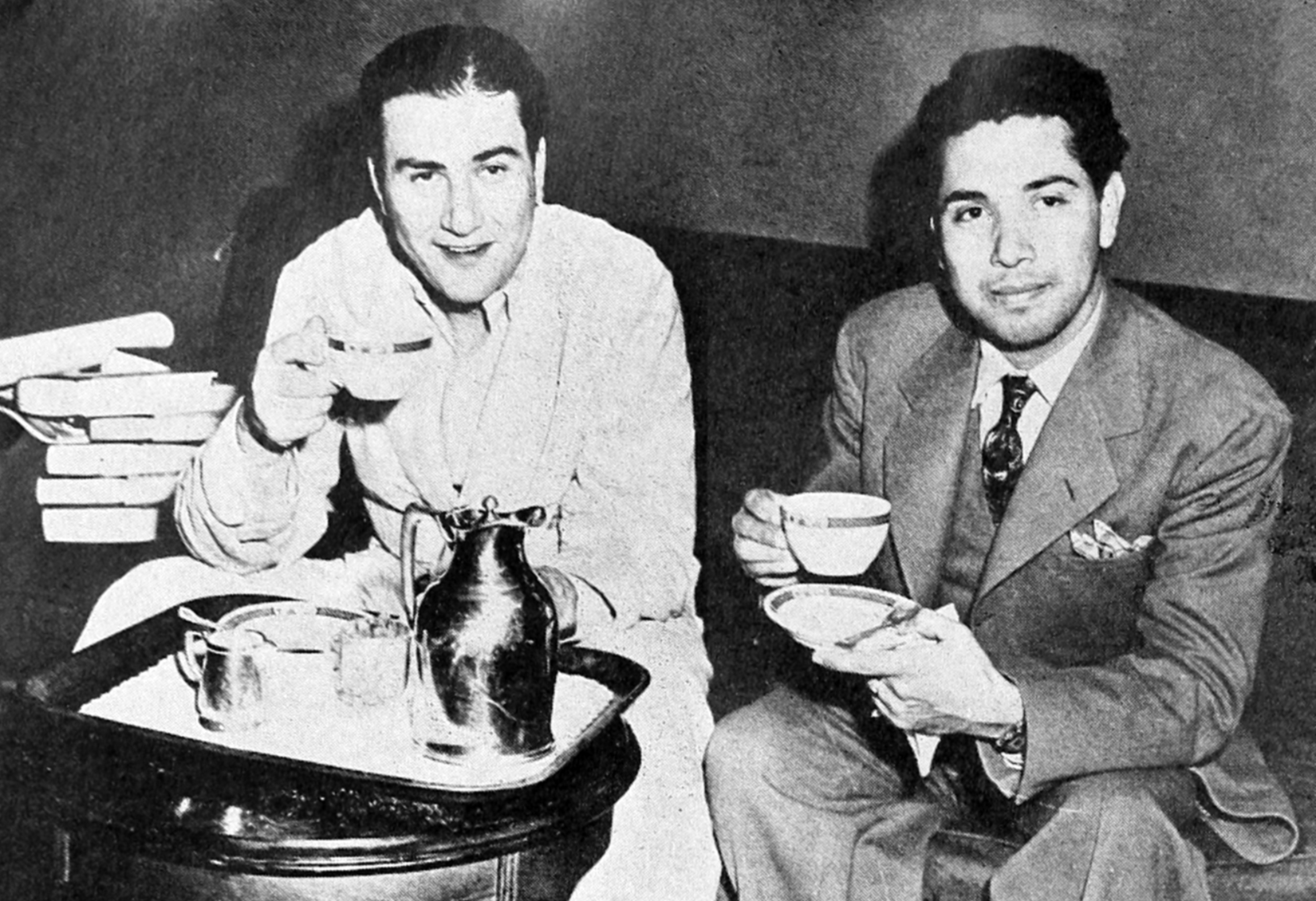
Songwriter Alberto Domínguez (right) with Artie Shaw in 1941

A hit version recorded by Artie Shaw and His Orchestra (with an arrangement by William Grant Still) reached number one on the Billboard pop chart on December 21, 1940, staying for 13 weeks, and was inducted into the Grammy Hall of Fame in 1982.

== Cover versions ==
Other performers who have recorded the song include: Julie London, Dave Brubeck, Gerry Mulligan, Natalie Cole, Ray Charles, Bing Crosby, Tommy Dorsey (sung by Frank Sinatra), and Woody Herman.

== In popular culture ==
- World War II flying ace Major (later Brigadier General) Thomas L. Hayes named his P-51 Frenesi after the song. He said it was a tribute to his wife Louise, for the song they listened to; he believed the song's name translated as "Love Me Tenderly".
- The Artie Shaw recording was used in the soundtrack of the 1980 film Raging Bull.

== See also ==
- List of 1930s jazz standards
- List of number-one singles of 1940 (U.S.)
- List of number-one singles of 1941 (U.S.)
