= 50th Golden Globe Awards =

Film award ceremony in 1993

- Date: January 23, 1993
- Site: The Beverly Hills Hilton Hotel, Beverly Hill, Los Angeles, California, U.S.
- Hosted by: Louis Gossett Jr. Leslie Nielsen; Jane Seymour

Highlights
- Best Film: Drama: Scent of a Woman
- Best Film: Musical or Comedy: The Player
- Best Drama Series: Northern Exposure
- Best Musical or Comedy Series: Roseanne
- Best Miniseries or Television movie: Sinatra
- Most awards: (3) Scent of a Woman; Roseanne; Stalin
- Most nominations: (5) A Few Good Men; Aladdin

Television coverage
- Network: TBS

The 50th Golden Globe Awards, honoring the best in film and television for 1992, were held on Saturday January 23, 1993 at the Beverly Hilton. The nominations were announced on December 29, 1992.

== Winners and nominees ==
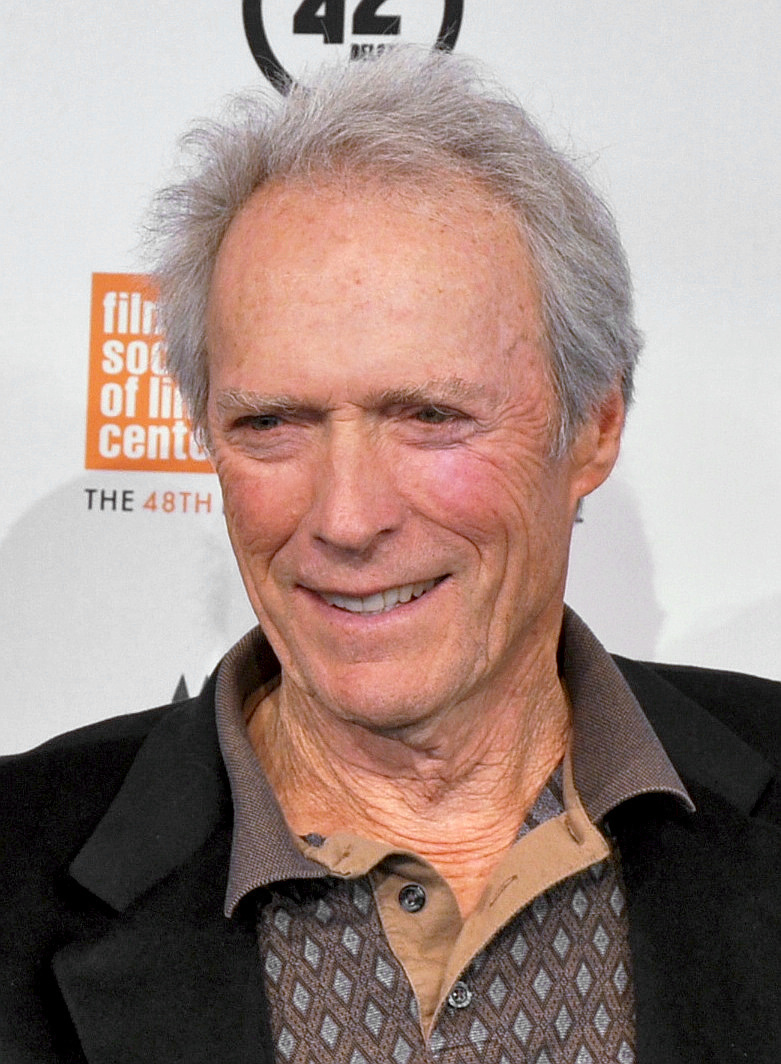
Clint Eastwood — Best Director, winner

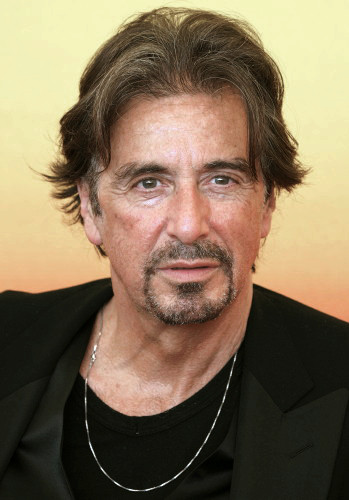
Al Pacino — Best Actor in a Motion Picture, Drama winner

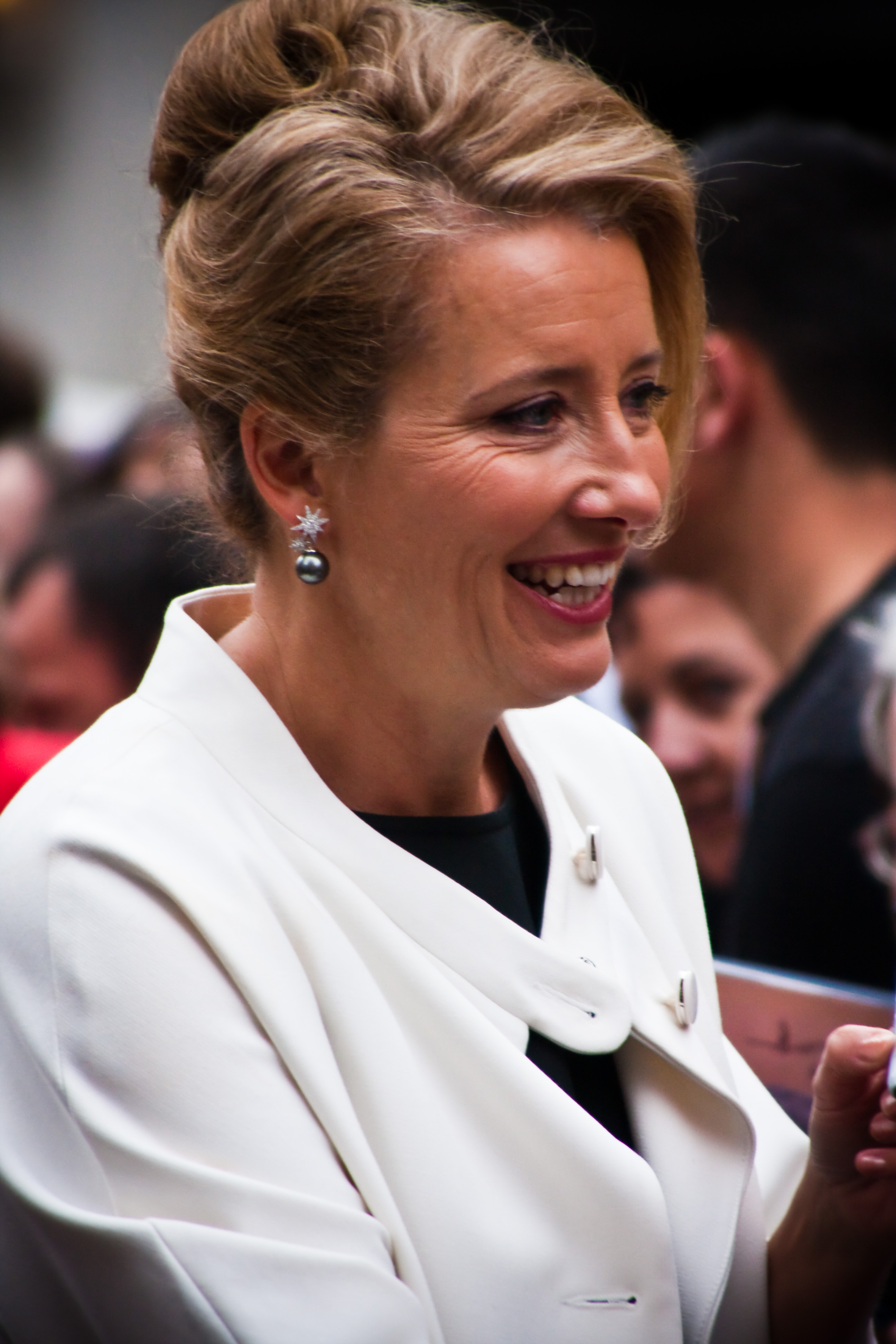
Emma Thompson — Best Actress in a Motion Picture, Drama winner

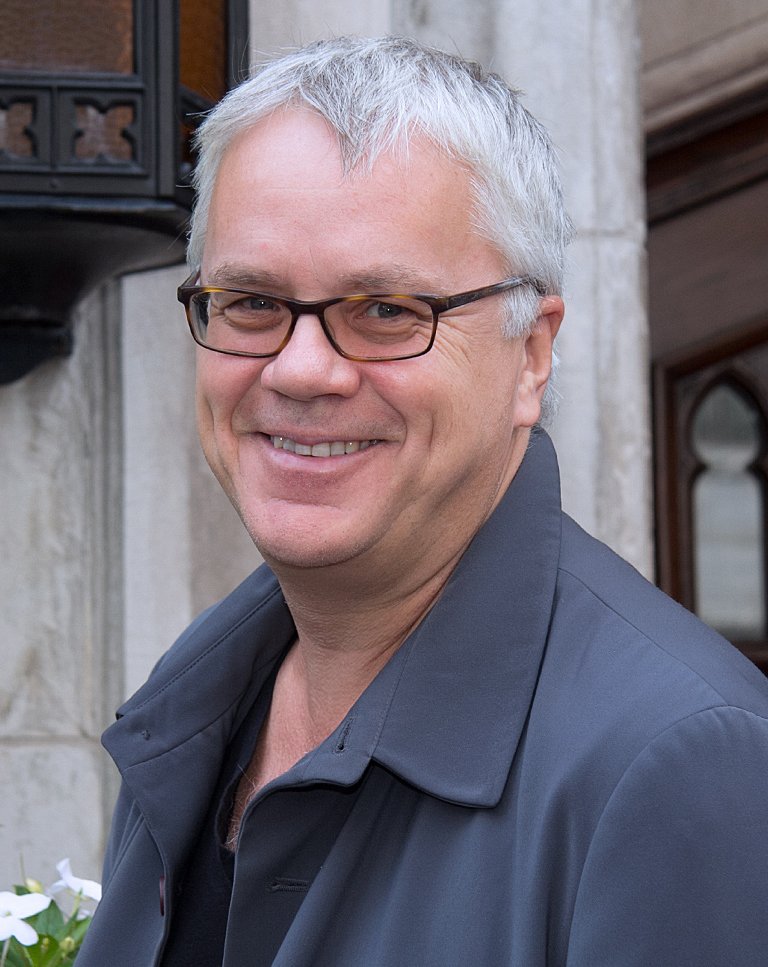
Tim Robbins — Best Actor in a Motion Picture, Musical or Comedy winner

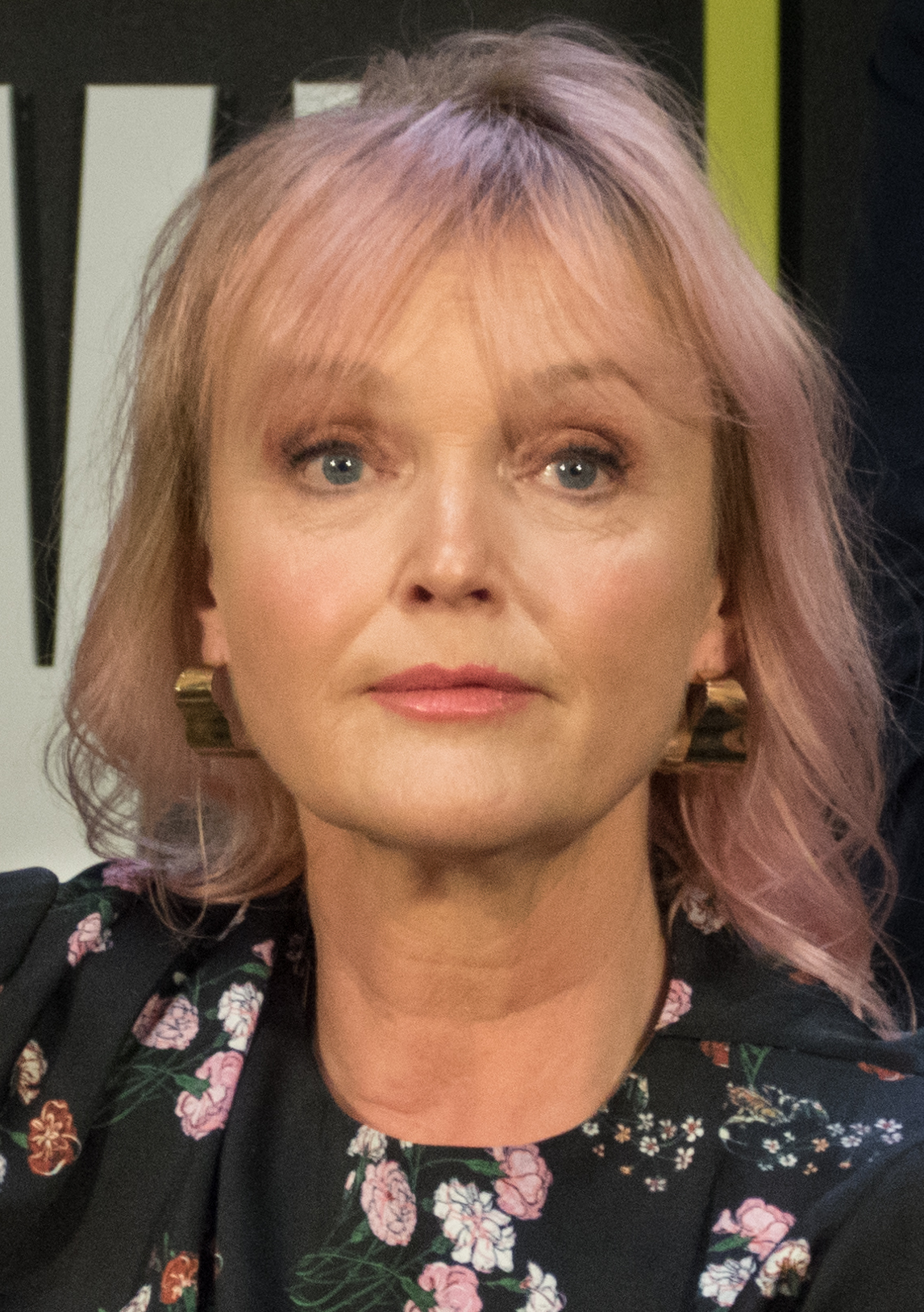
Miranda Richardson — Best Actress in a Motion Picture, Musical or Comedy winner

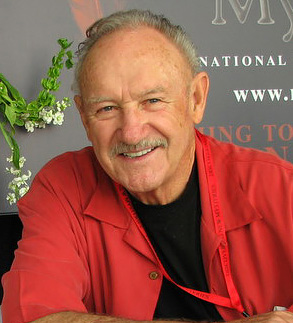
Gene Hackman — Best Supporting Actor in a Motion Picture Drama, Musical or Comedy winner

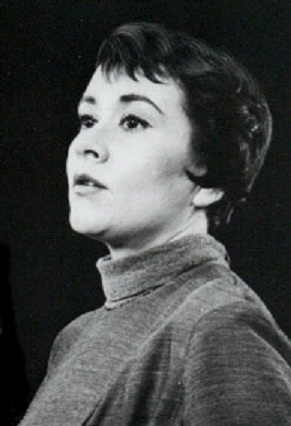
Joan Plowright — Best Supporting Actress in a Motion Picture Drama, Musical or Comedy winner

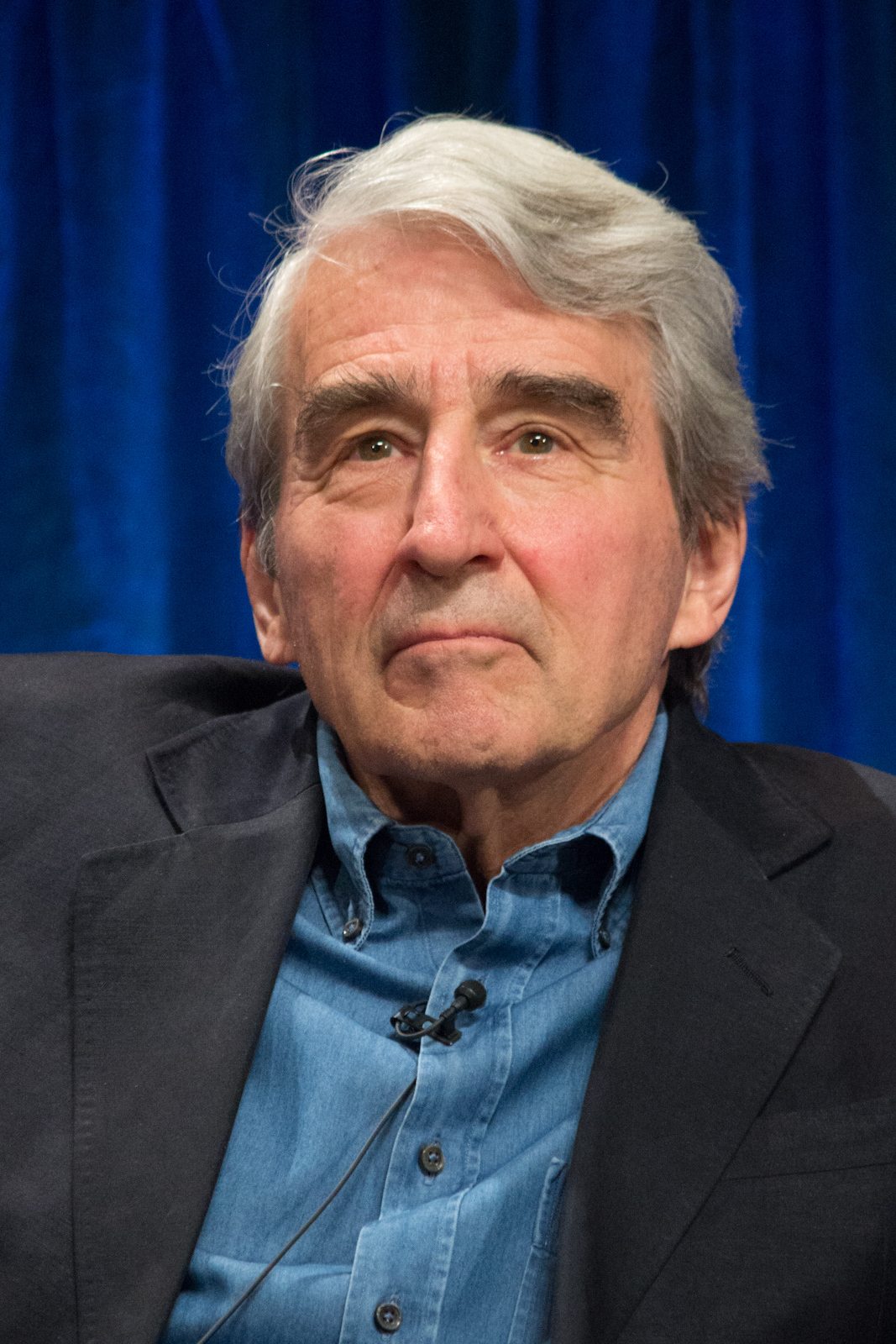
Sam Waterson — Best Actor in a Television Series, Drama winner

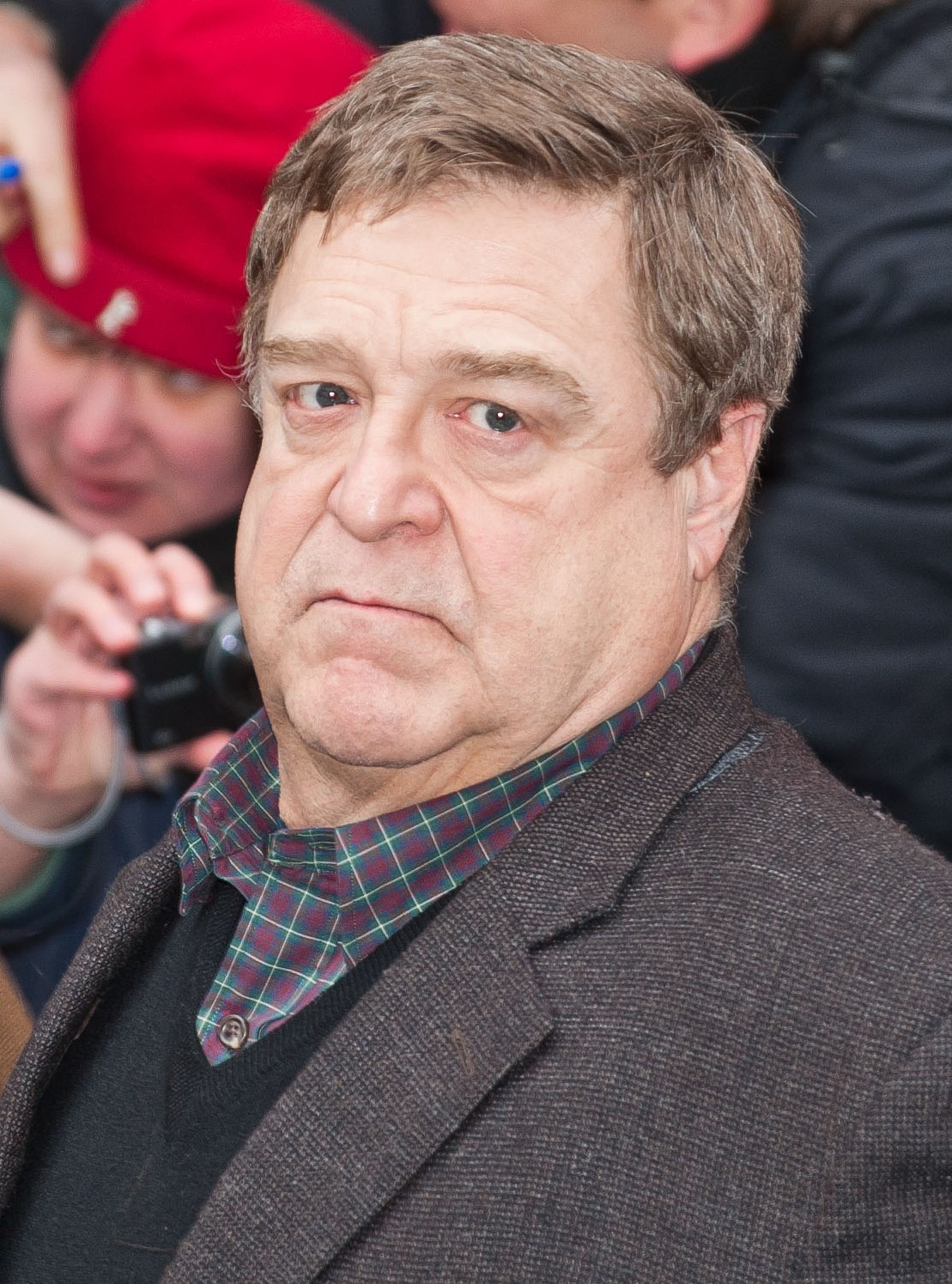
John Goodman — Best Actor in a Television Series, Musical or Comedy winner

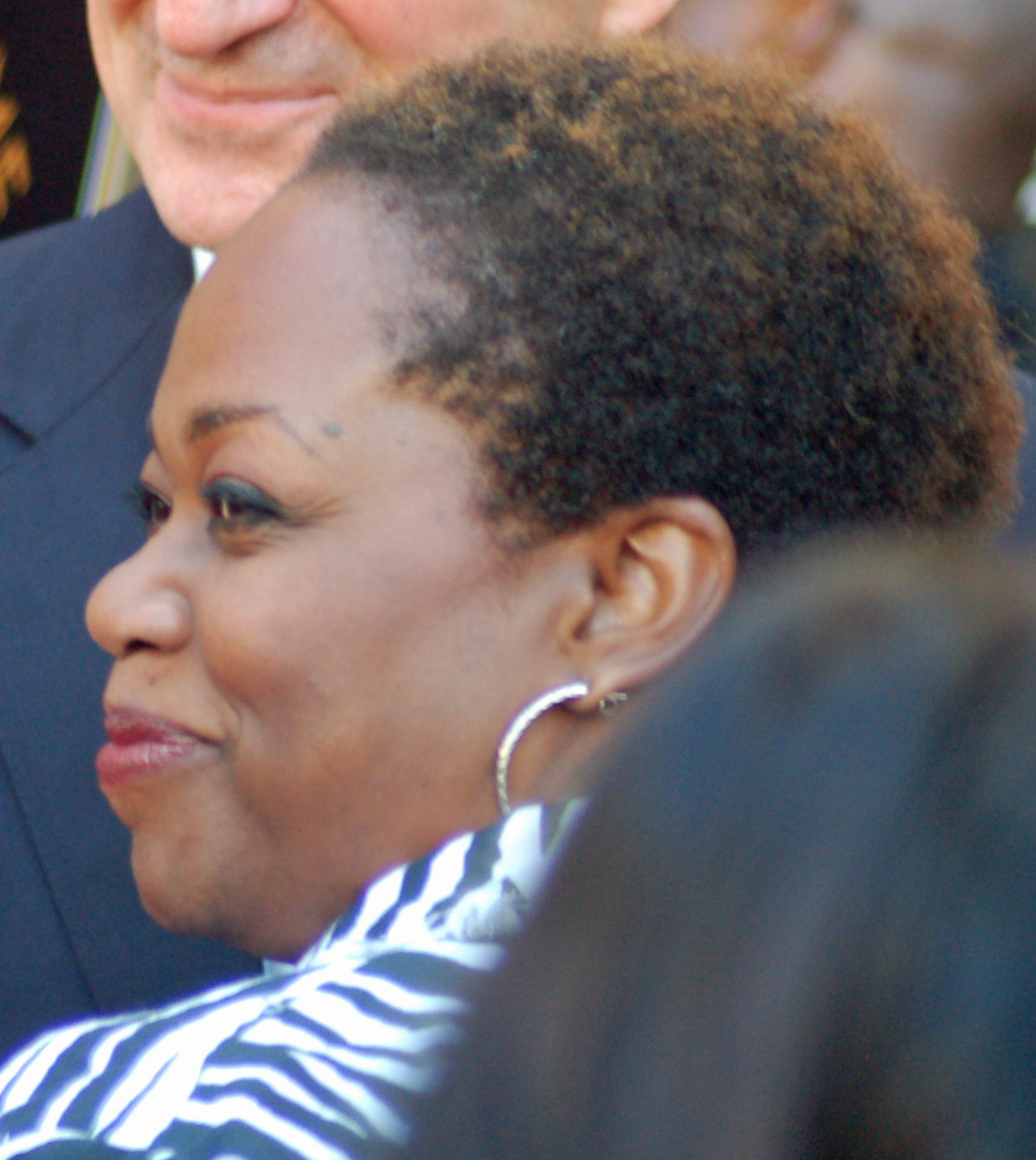
Regina Taylor — Best Actress in a Television Series, Drama winner

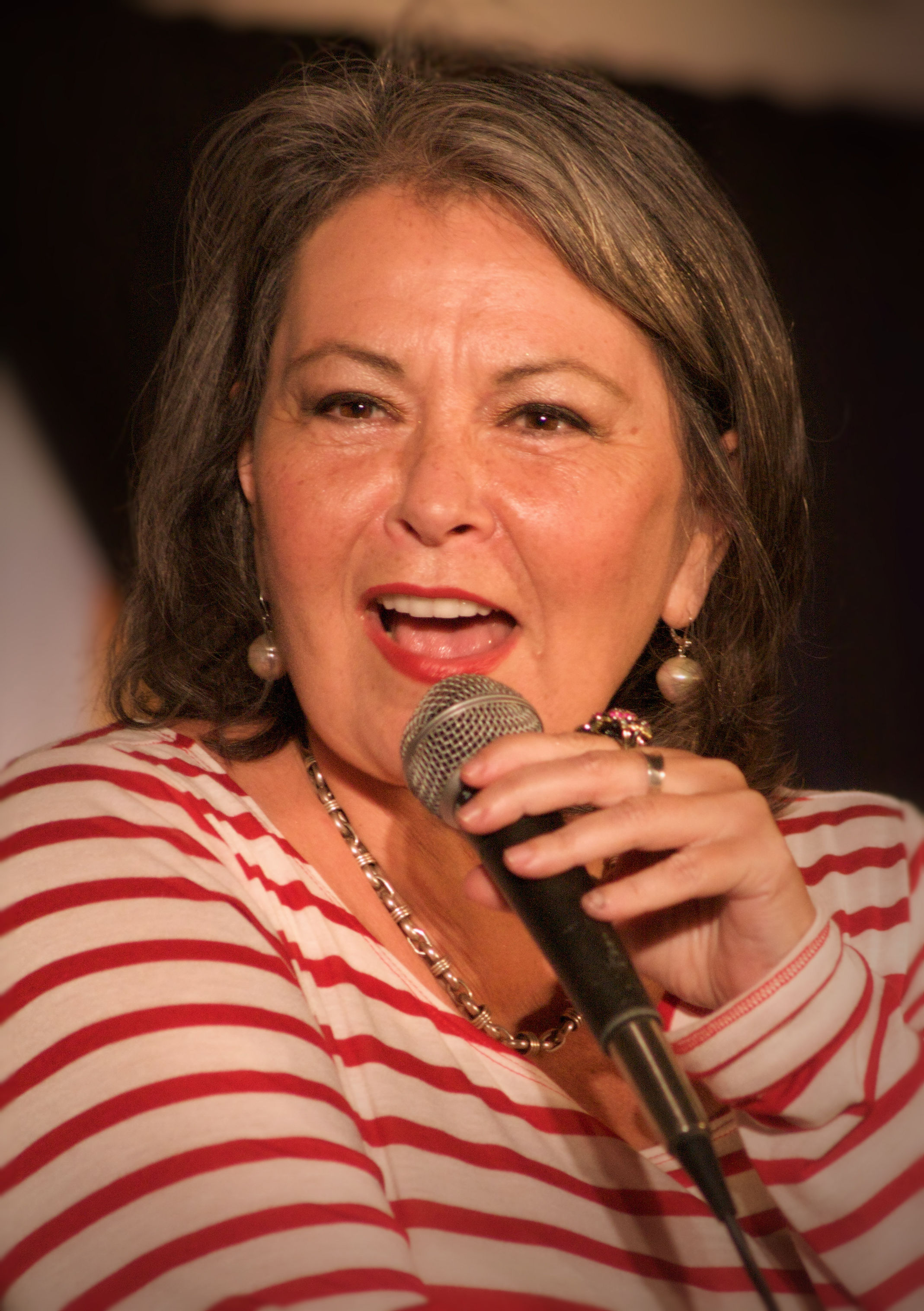
Roseanne Barr — Best Actress in a Television Series, Musical or Comedy winner

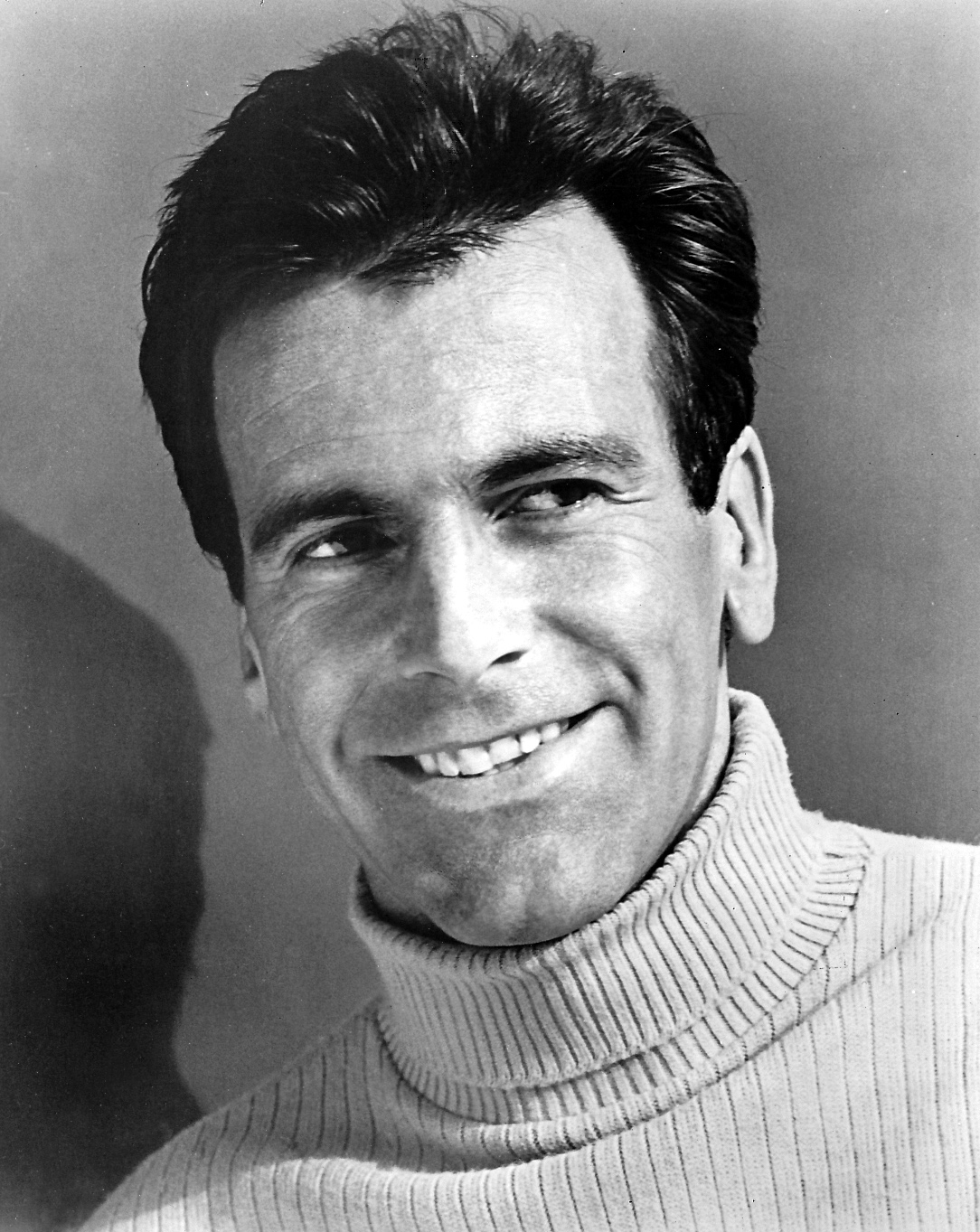
Maximilian Schell — Best Supporting Actor in a Series, Miniseries or Made for Television Film, winner

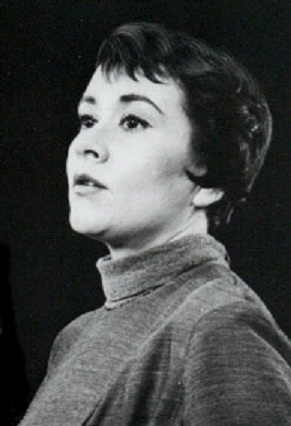
Joan Plowright — Best Supporting Actress in a Series, Miniseries or Motion Picture Made for Television winner

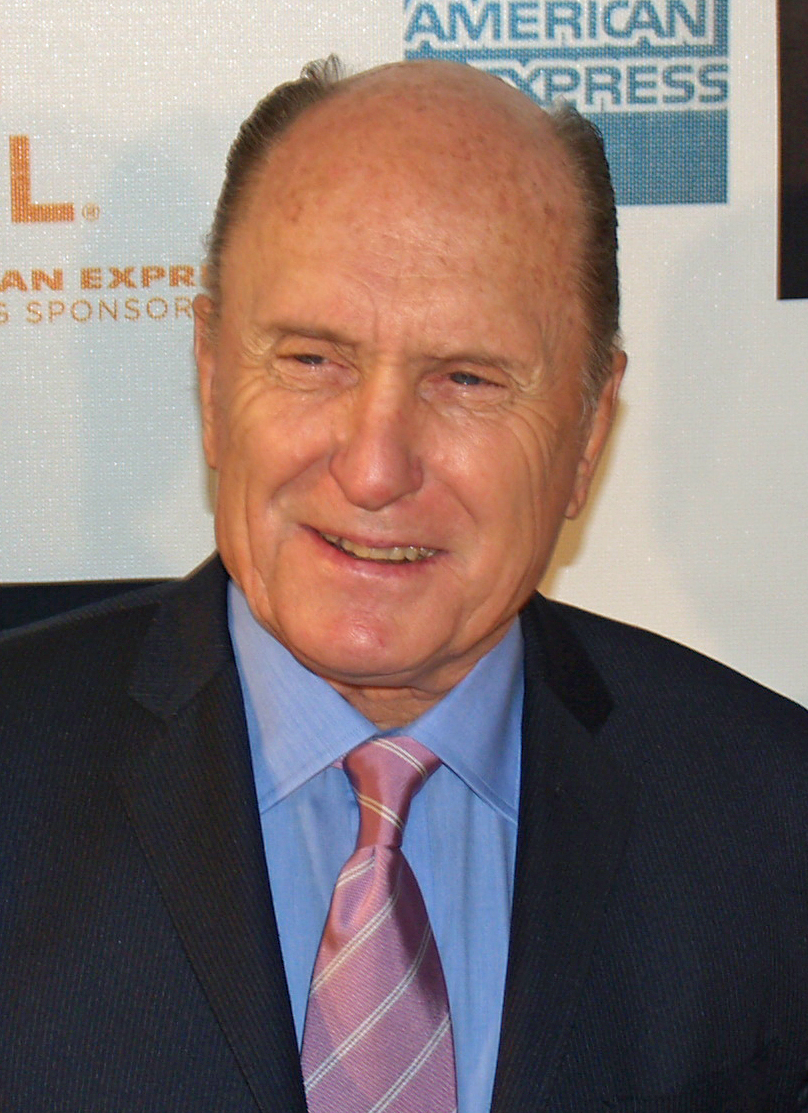
Robert Duvall — Best Actor in a Miniseries or Television Movie winner

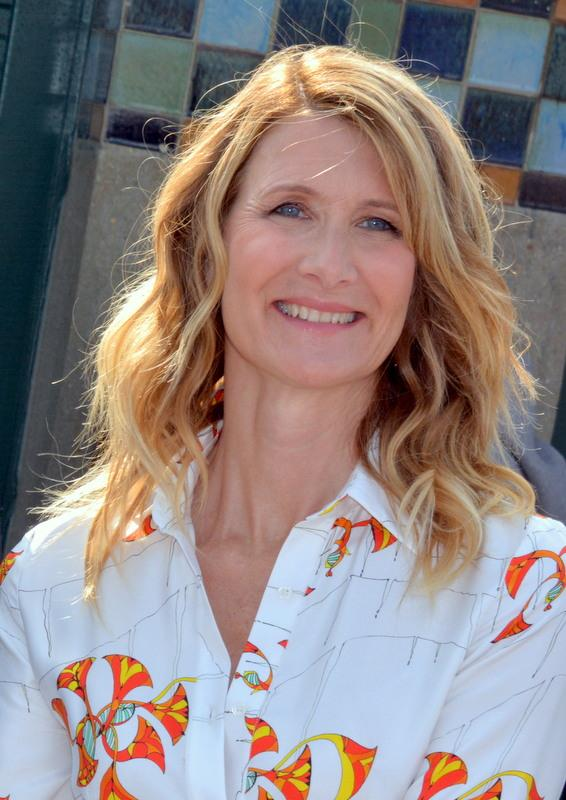
Laura Dern — Best Actress in a Miniseries or Television Film

=== Film ===
Best Motion Picture
Drama	Musical or Comedy
Scent of a Woman: The Crying Game; A Few Good Men; Howards End; Unforgiven	The Player: Aladdin; Enchanted April; Honeymoon in Vegas; Sister Act
Best Performance in a Motion Picture – Drama
Actor	Actress
Al Pacino – Scent of a Woman as Lieutenant Colonel Frank Slade: Tom Cruise – A Few Good Men as Lieutenant Daniel "Danny" Kaffee; Robert Downey Jr. – Chaplin as Charlie Chaplin; Jack Nicholson – Hoffa as Jimmy Hoffa; Denzel Washington – Malcolm X as Malcolm X	Emma Thompson – Howards End as Margaret Schlegel: Mary McDonnell – Passion Fish as Mary-Alice Culhane; Michelle Pfeiffer – Love Field as Louise Irene "Lurene" Hallett; Susan Sarandon – Lorenzo's Oil as Michaela Odone; Sharon Stone – Basic Instinct as Catherine Tramell
Best Performance in a Motion Picture – Musical or Comedy
Actor	Actress
Tim Robbins – The Player as Griffin Mill: Nicolas Cage – Honeymoon in Vegas as Jack Singer; Billy Crystal – Mr. Saturday Night as Buddy Young Jr.; Marcello Mastroianni – Used People as Joe Meladrandri; Tim Robbins – Bob Roberts as Robert "Bob" Roberts Jr.	Miranda Richardson – Enchanted April as Rose Arbuthnot: Geena Davis – A League of Their Own as Dorothy "Dottie" Hinson; Whoopi Goldberg – Sister Act as Deloris van Cartier / Sister Mary Clarence; Shirley MacLaine – Used People as Pearl Berman; Meryl Streep – Death Becomes Her as Madeline Ashton
Best Supporting Performance in a Motion Picture – Drama, Musical or Comedy
Supporting Actor	Supporting Actress
Gene Hackman – Unforgiven as Sheriff "Little" Bill Daggett: Jack Nicholson – A Few Good Men as Colonel Nathan R. Jessup; Chris O'Donnell – Scent of a Woman as Charlie Simms; Al Pacino – Glengarry Glen Ross as Richard "Ricky" Roma; David Paymer – Mr. Saturday Night as Stan Young	Joan Plowright – Enchanted April as Mrs. Fisher: Geraldine Chaplin – Chaplin as Hannah Chaplin; Judy Davis – Husbands and Wives as Sally Simmons; Miranda Richardson – Damage as Ingrid Thompson-Fleming; Alfre Woodard – Passion Fish as Chantelle
Best Director	Best Screenplay
Clint Eastwood – Unforgiven: Robert Altman – The Player; James Ivory – Howards End; Robert Redford – A River Runs Through It; Rob Reiner – A Few Good Men	Scent of a Woman – Bo Goldman: A Few Good Men – Aaron Sorkin; Howards End – Ruth Prawer Jhabvala; The Player – Michael Tolkin; Unforgiven – David Webb Peoples
Best Original Score	Best Original Song
Aladdin – Alan Menken: 1492: Conquest of Paradise – Vangelis; Basic Instinct – Jerry Goldsmith; Chaplin – John Barry; The Last of the Mohicans – Randy Edelman and Trevor Jones	"A Whole New World" performed by Peabo Bryson and Regina Belle – Aladdin: "Beautiful Maria of My Soul" – The Mambo Kings; "Friend Like Me" performed by Robin Williams – Aladdin; "Prince Ali" performed by Robin Williams – Aladdin; "This Used to Be My Playground" performed by Madonna – A League of Their Own
Best Foreign Language Film	
Indochine • France: All the World's Mornings (Tous les matins du monde) • France; Close to Eden (Urga) • Russia; Like Water for Chocolate (Como agua para chocolate) • Mexico; Schtonk! • Germany	

The following films received multiple nominations:

Nominations	Title
5	A Few Good Men
5	Aladdin
4	Howards End
4	The Player
4	Scent of a Woman
4	Unforgiven
3	Chaplin
3	Enchanted April
2	Basic Instinct
2	Honeymoon in Vegas
2	Passion Fish
2	Mr. Saturday Night
2	Sister Act
2	A League of Their Own
2	Used People

The following films received multiple wins:

Wins	Film
3	Scent of a Woman
2	The Player
2	Unforgiven
2	Enchanted April
2	Aladdin

=== Television ===
Best Television Series
Drama	Comedy or Musical
Northern Exposure: Beverly Hills, 90210; Homefront; I'll Fly Away; Sisters	Roseanne: Brooklyn Bridge; Cheers; Evening Shade; Murphy Brown
Best Lead Actor in a Television Series
Drama Series	Comedy or Musical Series
Sam Waterston – I'll Fly Away: Jason Priestley – Beverly Hills, 90210; Rob Morrow – Northern Exposure; Scott Bakula – Quantum Leap; Mark Harmon – Reasonable Doubts	John Goodman – Roseanne: Tim Allen – Home Improvement; Ted Danson – Cheers; Craig T. Nelson – Coach; Ed O'Neill – Married... with Children; Burt Reynolds – Evening Shade; Will Smith – The Fresh Prince of Bel-Air
Best Lead Actress in a Television Series
Drama Series	Comedy or Musical Series
Regina Taylor – I'll Fly Away: Mariel Hemingway – Civil Wars; Angela Lansbury – Murder, She Wrote; Marlee Matlin – Reasonable Doubts; Janine Turner – Northern Exposure	Roseanne Barr – Roseanne: Kirstie Alley – Cheers; Candice Bergen – Murphy Brown; Helen Hunt – Mad About You; Katey Sagal – Married... with Children
Best Supporting Performance - Series, Miniseries or Television Film
Best Supporting Actor – Series, Miniseries or Television Film	Best Supporting Actress – Series, Miniseries or Television Film
Maximilian Schell – Stalin: Jason Alexander – Seinfeld; John Corbett – Northern Exposure; Hume Cronyn – Broadway Bound; Earl Holliman – Delta; Dean Stockwell – Quantum Leap	Joan Plowright – Stalin: Olympia Dukakis – Sinatra; Laurie Metcalf – Roseanne; Park Overall – Empty Nest; Amanda Plummer – Miss Rose White; Gena Rowlands – Crazy in Love
Best Actor – Miniseries or Television Movie	Best Actress – Miniseries or Television Movie
Robert Duvall – Stalin: Anthony Andrews – Jewels; Philip Casnoff – Sinatra; Jon Voight – The Last of His Tribe; James Woods – Citizen Cohn	Laura Dern – Afterburn: Drew Barrymore – Guncrazy; Katharine Hepburn – The Man Upstairs; Jessica Lange – O Pioneers!; Kyra Sedgwick – Miss Rose White
Best Miniseries or Television Movie	
Sinatra: Citizen Cohn; Jewels; Miss Rose White; Stalin	

The following programs received multiple nominations:

Nominations	Title
4	Roseanne
4	Stalin
3	Cheers
3	I'll Fly Away
3	Miss Rose White
3	Northern Exposure
3	Sinatra
2	Beverly Hills, 90210
2	Citizen Cohn
2	Evening Shade
2	Jewels
2	Married... with Children
2	Murphy Brown
2	Quantum Leap
2	Reasonable Doubts

The following programs received multiple wins:

Wins	Series
3	Roseanne
3	Stalin
2	I'll Fly Away

== Ceremony ==
=== Presenters ===
- Richard Dean Anderson
- Anne Archer
- Rosanna Arquette
- Dan Aykroyd
- Drew Barrymore
- Kathy Bates
- Corbin Bernsen
- Jon Bon Jovi
- Beau Bridges
- Matthew Broderick
- Carol Burnett
- Diahann Carroll
- Richard Chamberlain
- James Coburn
- Harry Connick, Jr.
- Catherine Deneuve
- Amanda Donohoe
- Jodie Foster
- Teri Garr
- Marilu Henner
- Anthony Hopkins
- Christine Lahti
- Michele Lee
- Jay Leno
- John Lithgow
- Reba McEntire
- Bette Midler
- Sarah Jessica Parker
- Gregory Peck
- Victoria Principal
- Tom Selleck
- Cybill Shepherd
- Tom Skerritt
- Christian Slater
- Peter Strauss
- Patrick Swayze
- Jean-Claude Van Damme

=== Cecil B. DeMille Award ===
Lauren Bacall

=== Special Achievement Award ===
Robin Williams – For his vocal role work as the Genie in Aladdin.

== Awards breakdown ==
The following networks received multiple nominations:

Nominations	Network
20	NBC
14	CBS
10	ABC
8	HBO
4	Fox

The following networks received multiple wins:

Wins	Network
3	ABC
3	HBO
2	NBC

== See also ==
- 65th Academy Awards
- 13th Golden Raspberry Awards
- 44th Primetime Emmy Awards
- 45th Primetime Emmy Awards
- 46th British Academy Film Awards
- 47th Tony Awards
- 1992 in film
- 1992 in American television
