= Oscar Hijuelos =

American novelist

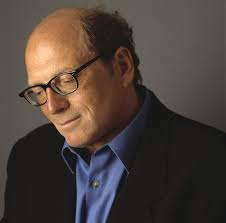
- Born: Oscar Jerome Hijuelos; August 24, 1951; New York City, U.S.
- Died: October 12, 2013 (aged 62); New York City, U.S.
- Education: Bronx Community College; Lehman College; Manhattan Community College; City College of New York (BA, MA)
- Occupation: Novelist
- Spouse: Lori Carlson
- Writing career
- Language: English
- Genres: Cuban/American, Latino: fiction and memoirs
- Notable work: The Mambo Kings Play Songs of Love (1989)
- Notable awards: Rome Prize (1985); Pulitzer Prize (1990)

Oscar Jerome Hijuelos (August 24, 1951 – October 12, 2013) was an American novelist of Cuban descent. During a year-long convalescence from a childhood illness spent in a Connecticut hospital, he lost his knowledge of Spanish, his parents' native language. He was educated in New York City, and wrote short stories and advertising copy.

For his second novel, The Mambo Kings Play Songs of Love (later adapted for the movie The Mambo Kings), he became the first Hispanic to win a Pulitzer Prize for fiction.

== Early life ==
Hijuelos was born in Morningside Heights, Manhattan, to Cuban immigrant parents, Pascual and Magdalena (Torrens) Hijuelos, both from Holguín, Cuba. His father worked as a hotel cook. As a young child, he suffered from acute nephritis after a vacation trip to Cuba with his mother and brother José, and was in St. Luke's Convalescent Hospital, Greenwich, Connecticut for almost a year, eventually recovering. During this long period separated from his Spanish-speaking family, he learned fluent English; he later wrote of this time: "I became estranged from the Spanish language and, therefore, my roots."

He attended Corpus Christi School in Morningside Heights, and public schools, and later Bronx Community College, Lehman College and Manhattan Community College. He studied writing at the City College of New York (B.A., 1975; M.A. in creative writing, 1976) under Donald Barthelme, Susan Sontag, William S. Burroughs, Frederic Tuten, and others. Barthelme became his mentor and friend. He practiced various professions, including working for an advertising agency, Transportation Displays Inc., before taking up writing full-time.

== Writing ==
Hijuelos started writing short stories and dramas while working in advertising. His first novel, Our House in the Last World, was published in 1983, and won the Rome Prize of the American Academy of Arts and Letters. This novel follows the life of a Cuban family in the United States during the 1940s, framed around the story of Hijuelos' parents' experience negotiating two cultural worlds.

His second novel, The Mambo Kings Play Songs of Love, received the 1990 Pulitzer Prize for Fiction. It was adapted in 1992 into the film The Mambo Kings, starring Armand Assante and Antonio Banderas, and as a musical in 2005. In its theme of the American immigrant experience, The Mambo Kings Play Songs of Love was similar to many of his works. Michiko Kakutani, reviewing the novel for The New York Times, describes it as "essentially elegiac in tone — a Chekhovian lament for a life of missed connections and misplaced dreams." His autobiography, Thoughts Without Cigarettes, was published in 2011. Bruce Weber, writing in the New York Times, described his style as "fluid prose, sonorous but more earthy than poetic, with a forthright American cadence."

His influences included writers from Cuba and Latin America, including Carlos Fuentes, José Lezama Lima and Gabriel García Márquez. Hijuelos expressed discomfort in his memoir with being pigeon-holed as an ethnic writer. Weber states "Unlike that of many well-known Latin writers, his work was rarely outwardly political."

When "Beautiful Maria of My Soul" was published, he corresponded with author Tom Miller: "I did this reading at Union Square B&N [Barnes & Noble] the other night, with a friend of mine providing music-- it kind of worked pretty well -- but it so happens that I mentioned your book, 'Trading with the Enemy'-- in the context of how charmed I was by the fact that you were carrying MKs ['The Mambo Kings'] with you while traveling through Cuba and that you had met a few folks somewhere (in Santiago?) who claimed to have once heard the MKs -- it happens that I've had similar experiences along the lines of 'And whatever happened to those guys?' as if they really existed (perhaps they did.) In any event, the fact that some folks really believe that the MKs had been around, sort of led me, in a very roundabout way, to the notion that a real Maria has existed all along...."

Oscar Hijuelos' Papers are located at Columbia University Libraries.

== Teaching ==
Hijuelos taught at Hofstra University and was affiliated with Duke University, where he was a member of the faculty of the Department of English for 6 years before his death.

== Awards ==
In addition to the 1990 Pulitzer Prize, Hijuelos received an Ingram Merrill Foundation Award in 1983, the year he published his first novel, Our House in the Last World. In 1985 the novel received the Rome Prize, awarded by the American Academy in Rome. In 2000, he received the Hispanic Heritage Award for Literature. In 2003 he received the Luis Leal Award for Distinction in Chicano/Latino Literature.

== Personal life ==
Hijuelos' first marriage ended in divorce. He married writer and editor Lori Marie Carlson on December 12, 1998, in Manhattan. Lori has since written a book about her experiences and in May 2026, appeared on the Off the Shelf podcast to discuss the book.

== Death ==
On October 12, 2013, Oscar Hijuelos collapsed of a heart attack while playing tennis in Manhattan and never regained consciousness. He was 62 years old. He is survived by his second wife.

== Legacy ==
The tennis courts that Hijuelos died on in Riverside Park, New York were renamed after him.

== Works ==
=== Major works ===
- Our House in the Last World (1983)
- The Mambo Kings Play Songs of Love (1989)
- The Fourteen Sisters of Emilio Montez O'Brien (1993)
- Mr. Ives' Christmas (1995)
- Empress of the Splendid Season (1999)
- A Simple Habana Melody (from when the world was good) (2002)
- Dark Dude (2008)
- Beautiful Maria of My Soul (2010)
- Thoughts Without Cigarettes: A Memoir (2011)
- Twain & Stanley Enter Paradise (2015) (manuscript edited and published posthumously)

=== Contributions ===
- Preface, Iguana Dreams: New Latino Fiction, edited by Delia Poey and Virgil Suarez. New York, HarperPerennial, 1992.
- Introduction, Cool Salsa: Bilingual Poems on Growing up Latino in the United States, edited by Lori M. Carlson. New York, Holt, 1994.
- Introduction, The Cuban American Family Album by Dorothy and Thomas Hoobler. New York, Oxford University Press, 1996.
- Contributor, Best of Pushcart Press III. Pushcart, 1978.
- Contributor, You're On!: Seven Plans in English and Spanish, edited by Lori M. Carlson. New York, Morrow Junior Books, 1999.

== See also ==
- Cuban American literature
- List of Cuban-American writers
- Latino literature
