= The Mambo Kings Play Songs of Love =

1989 novel by Oscar Hijuelos

- First edition cover
- Author: Oscar Hijuelos
- Language: English
- Genre: Magical realism
- Publisher: Farrar, Straus and Giroux
- Publication date: August 21, 1989
- Publication place: United States
- Media type: Print (Hardback & Paperback)
- Pages: 408 pp
- ISBN: 0-374-20125-0
- OCLC: 19353741
- Dewey Decimal: 813/.54 19
- LC Class: PS3558.I376 M36 1989

The Mambo Kings Play Songs of Love is a 1989 novel by Oscar Hijuelos.

It is about the lives of two Cuban brothers and musicians, Cesar and Nestor Castillo, who immigrate to the United States and settle in New York City in the early 1950s.

The novel won the Pulitzer Prize for Fiction in 1990, being the first novel by a United States-born Hispanic to do so. It was the basis for a 1992 motion picture, The Mambo Kings, as well as a musical in 2005.

The Mambo Kings Play Songs of Love was published in 1989, and soon became a huge international bestseller. It tells the story of Cesar Castillo, an aged musician who once had a small amount of fame when he and his brother Nestor appeared on an episode of I Love Lucy in the 1950s. The book chronicles Cesar's last hours as he sits in a seedy hotel room, drinking and listening to recordings made by his band, the Mambo Kings.

Events and characters whirl through Cesar's mind, evoking what he has lost over the years: his brother and collaborator, Nestor, who spent his adult life constantly rewriting one song about a lost love; the many lovers who gave themselves up to him as he rose triumphantly through the mambo music craze of the early 1950s; and the way of life that disappeared for all Cubans after the 1959 revolution led by Fidel Castro. Cesar's memories after coming to the US include events in the lives of his and Nestor's girlfriends, wives, and children. In telling Cesar's story, Hijuelos weaves in cameo appearances by several real-life mambo musicians, including Desi Arnaz, Tito Puente, Pérez Prado, Machito, and Mongo Santamaría.

The novel develops one of Hijuelos' most common themes: how immigrants adjust to coming to the United States and how they see themselves in relation to their new culture in contrast to the culture of their birth. Also, the book showcases Hijuelos' distinctive, richly detailed description of his characters' lives written in a prose-style that evokes the rhythms of Cuban music. Hijuelos released a follow-up novel Beautiful Maria of My Soul in 2010, which centers on the character Maria Garcia y Cifuentes and retells some of the events of the first novel from her perspective.
