= Alberto Domínguez (composer) =

Mexican marimbist and composer

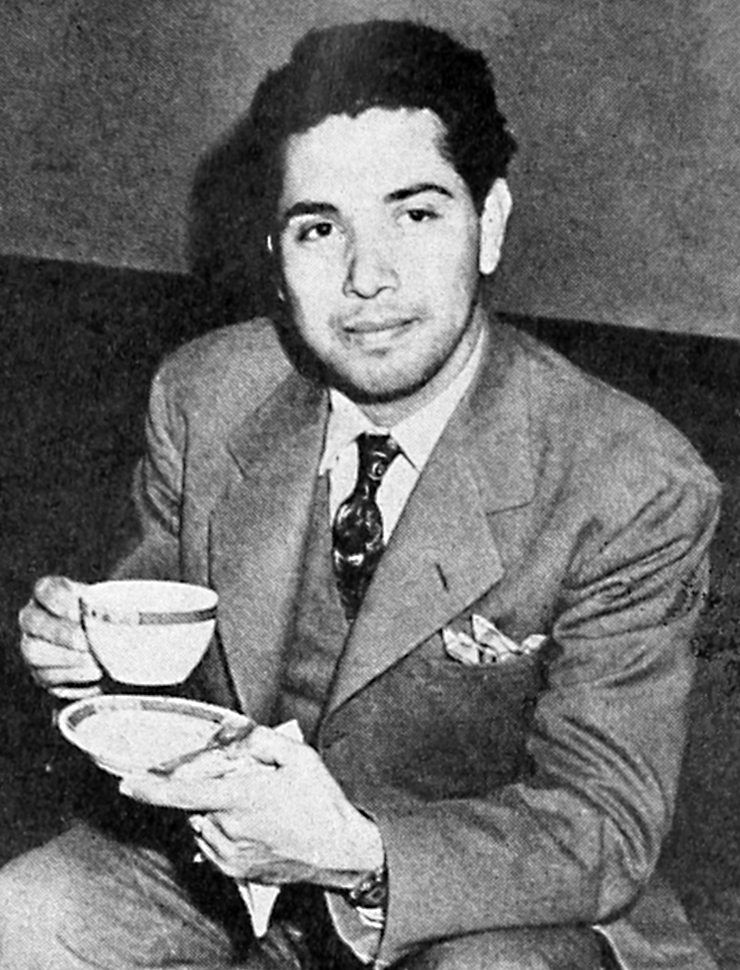
- Alberto Domínguez in 1941
- Born: 21 April 1913; San Cristóbal de Las Casas, Chiapas, Mexico
- Died: 2 September 1975 (aged 62); Mexico City, Mexico
- Occupations: Marimbist and composer
- Writing career
- Notable works: Frenesi; Perfidia

Alberto Domínguez Borrás (San Cristóbal de Las Casas, Chiapas, 21 April 1913 – Mexico City, 2 September 1975) was a Mexican marimbist and composer. He began his career in a marimba ensemble, Los Hermanos Domínguez. His most famous songs, both from 1939, are "Frenesi" and "Perfidia".

== Songs ==
External audio
- You may listen to Dominguez's "Perfidia" performed by Xavier Cugat conducting his Waldorf-Astoria Orchestra in 1939 here on archive.org

- "Frenesi" (1939)
- "Perfidia" (1939)
- "A Rendezvous In Rio" (Xavier Cugat, 1941)
- "Un Momento" (Enric Madriguera, 1941)
- "Ranchero Soy" / "Al Son De La Marimba" (Rafael Medina, 1942)
- "Vamos A La Guerra" (Martin Y Malena, 1942)
- "Mala Noche" (Carlos Ramírez, 1943)
- "Juntos" (Eduardo Alexander, 1945)
- "Maybe Love Is Nothing But An Illusion" (Benny de Weille, 1949)
- "Bad Thoughts" (Lolita Garrido, 1949)
- "I've Been Waiting A Lifetime" (The Four Aces, 1953)
- "Amor Que Muere" (Lupita Palomera, 1957)
- "Humanidad" (Fernando Rosas and the Orchestra of Pablo Beltrán Ruiz, 1958)

== Discography ==
- Perfidia ('Orquesta, canciones y arreglos de Alberto Dominguez' RCA Victor MKL 1068, ca. 1955)
