= The Mambo Kings =

1992 film by Arne Glimcher

- Theatrical release poster
- Directed by: Arne Glimcher
- Screenplay by: Cynthia Cidre
- Based on: The Mambo Kings Play Songs of Love by Oscar Hijuelos
- Produced by: Arnon Milchan; Arne Glimcher
- Starring: Armand Assante; Antonio Banderas; Cathy Moriarty; Maruschka Detmers
- Cinematography: Michael Ballhaus
- Edited by: Claire Simpson
- Production companies: Le Studio Canal+; Regency Enterprises; Alcor Films; Northwest Productions
- Distributed by: Warner Bros.
- Release dates: February 7, 1992 (MIFF); February 28, 1992 (United States)
- Running time: 104 minutes
- Countries: United States; France
- Language: English
- Budget: $15.5 million
- Box office: $6.7 million

The Mambo Kings is a 1992 musical drama film based on the 1989 Pulitzer Prize-winning novel The Mambo Kings Play Songs of Love by Oscar Hijuelos. The film was directed and produced by Arne Glimcher, and stars Armand Assante, Antonio Banderas, Cathy Moriarty and Maruschka Detmers. Set in the early 1950s, the story follows Cesar (Assante) and Nestor Castillo (Banderas), brothers and aspiring musicians who find success and stardom after fleeing from Havana, Cuba to New York City to escape danger. The film marks Glimcher's directing debut, and features Banderas in his first English-language role.

Glimcher acquired the film rights one year before the novel was published and hired Cynthia Cidre to write the script. The film was rejected by several studios, and after an unsuccessful pre-production at Universal Pictures, the project moved to Warner Bros. The production was allocated a budget of $15.5 million jointly financed by Warner Bros., Le Studio Canal+ and Regency Enterprises. The film was shot on location in Los Angeles, California, with principal photography beginning in March 1991, and concluding after 50 days.

The Mambo Kings premiered at the Miami International Film Festival on February 7, 1992. It opened in limited release on February 28, 1992, and grossed $6.7 million during its North American theatrical run. Critical reaction was mostly positive, with reviewers praising Glimcher's direction, the story, music and visuals. The film received Oscar, Golden Globe Award and Grammy nominations for its original song "Beautiful Maria of My Soul".

== Plot ==
In the early 1950s, Cuban brothers and musicians Cesar and Nestor Castillo flee from Havana, Cuba after getting into a violent dispute with the mobster owners of a club where they performed. Eventually ending up in New York City, the brothers work at menial jobs while attempting to revive their musical careers. At a nightclub where Cesar briefly crashes the act of mambo star Tito Puente, they make new friends and connections, as well as meeting cigarette girl Lanna Lake, who falls quickly into a love affair with Cesar.

Nestor, in the meantime, remains oblivious to other women while continually composing his ode to his lost Cuban love, Maria Rivera. He writes version after version of the same ballad, "Beautiful Maria of My Soul", until by chance one day he encounters Delores Fuentes, a shy but attentive young woman who wishes to become a schoolteacher. When she becomes pregnant, they decide to get married.

Fate intervenes one night at a club, where the Castillo brothers have a part-time job. Nestor's love ballad captures the interest of one of the customers, who turns out to be the Cuban bandleader and American television star Desi Arnaz. After a pleasant evening in Nestor and Delores's home, Arnaz invites the struggling Castillos to sing and act on an episode of his sitcom series, I Love Lucy.

Fame does not last, however. Nestor is not as ambitious as his brother and desires nothing more than to own his own small club. He is in love with Delores, but lacks the passion he felt for his beloved Maria back home. Cesar suppresses his true feelings, believing that a woman like Delores would actually be perfect for him. He reveals to Nestor that Maria left him for a Cuban mobster Luis Fajardo in exchange for cancelling a contract hit against Nestor. One snowy night, the Castillo brothers' car veers off the road and into a tree. Cesar, in the back seat of the vehicle, is barely hurt, but Nestor, who was driving the vehicle, is killed. To honor his brother's memory, a devastated Cesar opens his own small club. Delores pays him a visit and asks him to sing "Beautiful Maria of My Soul".

== Cast ==
- Armand Assante as Cesar Castillo
- Antonio Banderas as Nestor Castillo
- Cathy Moriarty as Lanna Lake
- Maruschka Detmers as Delores Fuentes
- Desi Arnaz, Jr. as Desi Arnaz, Sr.
- Roscoe Lee Browne as Fernando Perez
- Talisa Soto as Maria Rivera
- Vondie Curtis-Hall as Miguel Montoya
- Cordelia Gonzales as Anna Maria
- Tito Puente as himself
- Helena Carroll as Mrs. Shannon
- Celia Cruz as Evalina Montoya

== Production ==
=== Development ===
Arne Glimcher, an art dealer based in New York City and a fan of mambo music, learned that his longtime friend Oscar Hijuelos was writing a novel relating to the latter subject. After reading a manuscript of Hijuelos's novel The Mambo Kings Play Songs of Love, Glimcher purchased the film rights in 1988, one year before the book was published. He also appointed himself as director, believing that he was the only person capable of successfully adapting the book to film. Glimcher later hired Cuban-born screenwriter Cynthia Cidre to write the film adaptation. Cidre spent eighteen months working on the screenplay, and after 24 drafts, she had stripped the story down to cover only half of Hijuelos's 407-page book. While the book spans several decades, events in the film take place from 1952 to 1955.

Various studios rejected the film, resulting in Glimcher paying the crew's salaries with his own money. When the project moved to Universal Pictures, Glimcher tried to convince the studio's president Tom Pollock to financially back it with a low budget. Before production could begin, Pollock insisted that footage from the television series I Love Lucy be a key part of the film. Following Lucille Ball's death in 1989, Glimcher contacted her children Lucie Arnaz and Desi Arnaz, Jr., requesting the rights to use footage from the television series, but was denied by the two siblings. Shortly after, Universal dropped the film due to budget disputes. In 1990, Glimcher wrote a letter to Arnaz, Jr., asking that he reconsider, and the two men reached an agreement. The project was picked up by Warner Bros. Pictures after Glimcher met with the studio's president Terry Semel. Semel then introduced Glimcher to producer Arnon Milchan, whose production company Regency Enterprises agreed to co-finance the film with Warner Bros. and France's Le Studio Canal+, with the German-based studio Alcor Films enlisted as a co-producer.

=== Casting ===
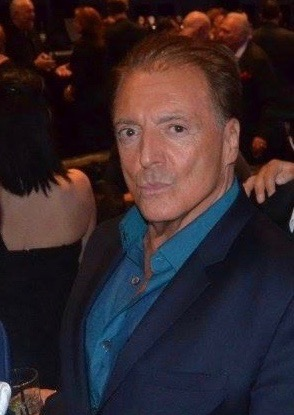
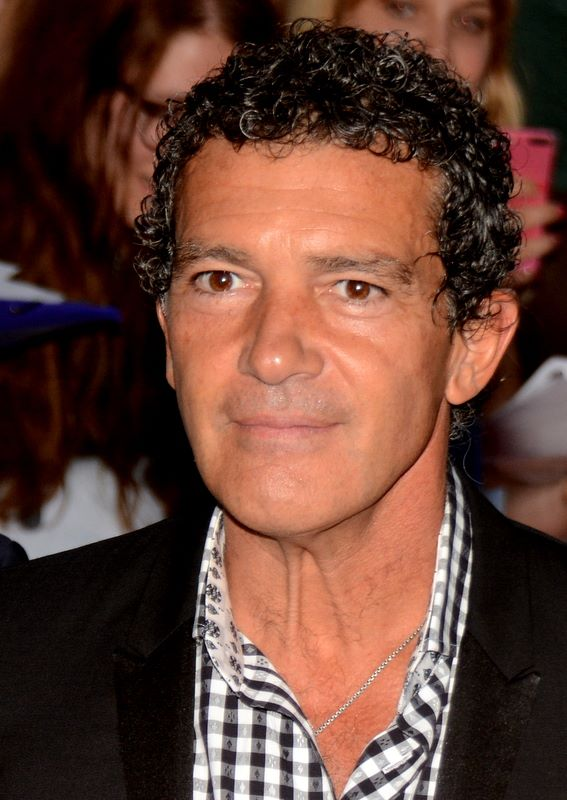
Left to right: Armand Assante (pictured in 2015) and Antonio Banderas (pictured in 2014), who star in the film

Armand Assante and Antonio Banderas were Glimcher's ideal choices for the roles of Cesar and Nestor Castillo. Assante had appeared in a number of films but had not yet broken out as a major star. Banderas, an established Spanish actor, had moved to Los Angeles, California, hoping to make an international debut with his first English speaking role. Warner Bros. wanted to cast Jeremy Irons as Cesar and Ray Liotta as Nestor. Both actors had received critical acclaim for their respective performances in the 1990 films Reversal of Fortune and Goodfellas, and the studio felt that they would appeal to a wide audience. Through a translator, Glimcher told Banderas to work on improving his English for one month before performing a screen test opposite Irons. Banderas learned his lines phonetically and worked with a dialect coach during pre-production and filming. Although Warner Bros. loved Irons's screen test, Glimcher thought he was wrong for the part and insisted on Assante. The director felt that Assante had brought both charm and seductiveness to the role of Cesar, and the studio relented.

Cathy Moriarty was the only actress that Glimcher considered for the role of Lanna Lake, based on her performance in Raging Bull (1980), where he explained that decision: "I wanted a woman rather than a girl. I wanted a character who had lived, who had scars, who had beauty and dignity. I thought of Cathy's life, and I thought of how it worked for the character as well". Annabella Sciorra was originally cast as Delores Fuentes, but left the production due to a scheduling conflict. The role then went to Dutch actress Maruschka Detmers, who was cast just two weeks prior to filming. Detmers appears in her American film debut.

In securing the rights to use footage from I Love Lucy, Glimcher convinced Desi Arnaz, Jr. to portray his late father Desi Arnaz. To prepare for the role, Arnaz, Jr. dyed his hair black and wore an ID bracelet, ring and pin, all of which had belonged to his father: "I wasn't trying to look exactly like him. It was more about getting his essence and mannerisms". In an effort to re-create the mambo world of the 1950s, Glimcher cast musicians Tito Puente and Celia Cruz in supporting roles.

=== Filming ===
Principal photography commenced on March 18, 1991. The film was made with a budget of $15.5 million, and shot on location in Los Angeles, California, which doubled for scenes set in a 1950s-era New York City. Cinematographer Michael Ballhaus shot the film using Arriflex 535 cameras. For the film's visual style, production designer Stuart Wurtzel was influenced by 1950s photographs and the 1955 film Mambo Madness. Costume designer Ann Roth used vintage textiles to create the custom-made wardrobe.

The production first shot scenes at Ren-Mar Studios, the former site of Desilu Productions. The location was used to recreate the living room and Tropicana nightclub sets from I Love Lucy. Lucille Ball's appearance from the 1952 episode "Cuban Pals" was intercut with the newly shot footage. The Ambassador Hotel was used to recreate the Palladium Ballroom, a former New York City concert hall. The Embassy Theatre in downtown Los Angeles depicted a nightclub known as Club Babalu, while the Tower Theatre doubled for scenes set in the fictional Empire Ballroom. A meat-packaging plant in Vernon was used for scenes set in the Castillo brothers' workplace. The filmmakers also shot scenes in San Marino, where Lacy Park doubled for scenes set in New York City's Central Park. Scenes set in Mexico were shot on location in Westward Beach in Malibu. Principal photography concluded after 50 days of filming.

=== Music and soundtrack ===
Assante and Banderas did their own singing, and studied to master the instruments their characters use in the film. Assante practiced on drums, preparing for a scene in which his character plays a musical number with Tito Puente. Banderas worked to mimic the correct posture and finger placements for his character's trumpet performances, while the actual playing was performed by Arturo Sandoval. Executive music producer Robert Kraft used existing music from the 1950s, all of which had to be re-recorded, as they were originally recorded in mono sound. The song "Beautiful Maria of My Soul" was written for the film, with lyrics by Glimcher and music composed by Kraft.

The original soundtrack album was released in 1991 by Elektra Records. It features a number of original master recordings, re-recorded tracks and mambo-themed songs performed by Sandoval, Tito Puente and Celia Cruz. The soundtrack was re-released on February 1, 2000, and features a remix of the Puente song "Ran Kan Kan" performed by Olga Tañón. and an alternate version of "Beautiful Maria of My Soul" performed by Banderas and Compay Segundo. A remastered version of the soundtrack was released on June 30, 2017, by the record label Varèse Sarabande. AllMusic's Al Campbell awarded the soundtrack four stars out of five and praised it for "providing an excellent introduction to Latin music".

== Release ==
Warner Bros. originally planned a theatrical release on December 25, 1991 but it was pushed back due to post-production delays. The Mambo Kings premiered at the Miami International Film Festival on February 7, 1992 before opening in limited release on February 28, 1992. The film expanded to 185 screens on March 13, 1992. By the end of its theatrical run, The Mambo Kings grossed $6,742,168 in North America, well below its $15.5 million budget. The film was released on VHS and laserdisc on September 2, 1992, and on DVD on August 17, 2005. The DVD includes an unrated version of the film that restores a deleted scene. Other features include a behind-the-scenes featurette and an audio commentary by Glimcher.

=== Critical response ===
The review aggregation website Rotten Tomatoes sampled 29 reviews, and gave the film a score of 79%, with an average score of 6.6 out of 10.

The film received mostly positive reviews. Peter Travers of Rolling Stone wrote that the film "runs on pure emotion", and "celebrates the mysterious power of a music that can make you feel like dancing and bring you to your knees". Roger Ebert of the Chicago Sun-Times wrote that the film's "story is as old as the movies, but The Mambo Kings is so filled with energy, passion and heedless vitality that it seems new, anyway". Ebert and his colleague, Gene Siskel, gave the film a "Two Thumbs Up" rating on their syndicated television program, Siskel and Ebert and the Movies. Rita Kempley of The Washington Post praised the film's director, writing that "Glimcher shows an epicure's taste in his choice of both cast and crew. The look of The Mambo Kings is doubtless richer than the text, which is, however, strengthened by Glimcher's nostalgia for the teenage, eager America of the 1950s". Owen Gleiberman of Entertainment Weekly wrote, "The Mambo Kings is most fun when it practically dares you to swoon. It's a movie you don't have to believe to enjoy". Betty Goodwin of the Los Angeles Times praised the film's visual style: "The innocence of the pre-MTV '50s mambo scene is expressed through meticulously real details and honest styling".

Desson Howe of The Washington Post wrote a mixed review, writing that the film is "beautifully filmed and flashily edited", but that it "has nothing to offer". Vincent Canby of The New York Times, gave the film a negative review, writing, "there are times when the director doesn't even seem to know where to put the camera. Scenes unravel without dramatic point. No amount of breathless editing and fancy graphics can disguise the amateur nature of the enterprise". In The Philadelphia Inquirer, Roger E. Hernandez criticized the film for its portrayal of Cubans. Hernandez wrote: "The main problem here was the accents. The characters were supposed to be Cuban, but, with the exception of salsa star Celia Cruz, none sounded it". Kenneth Turan of the Los Angeles Times criticized Glimcher's direction, writing in his review, "...when it comes to directing dramatic sequences, he is on his own and lacking in resources to make what drama there is come to a coherent or meaningful point".

Desi Arnaz Jr. voiced his support of the film, stating that he and his sister Lucie Arnaz, "loved the story being told in this movie". Arnaz, Jr. said: "It is an amazing saga of people in search of the American dream. It is my father's story. It is the story of many people who came to this country with hopes and dreams". Tito Puente praised the film prior to its theatrical release: "I've seen the movie twice, and I loved it the second time. The first time I couldn't get into it. I was watching for too many details, I guess. But now I've seen it a second time, and I think it's great".

=== Accolades ===
The song "Beautiful Maria of My Soul" received a Best Original Song nomination at the 65th Academy Awards. It was also nominated at the 50th Golden Globe Awards for Best Original Song, and at the 35th Annual Grammy Awards for Best Song Written Specifically for a Motion Picture or for Television category. The film received a second Grammy nomination for Best Instrumental Composition Written for a Motion Picture or for Television for the song "Mambo Caliente" which was composed by Arturo Sandoval.

Award	Category	Recipient(s)	Result
35th Grammy Awards	Best Song Written Specifically for a Motion Picture or for Television	Arne Glimcher and Robert Kraft for "Beautiful Maria of My Soul"	Nominated
35th Grammy Awards	Best Instrumental Composition Written for a Motion Picture or for Television	Arturo Sandoval for "Mambo Caliente"	Nominated
50th Golden Globe Awards	Best Original Song	Arne Glimcher and Robert Kraft for "Beautiful Maria of My Soul"	Nominated
65th Academy Awards	Best Original Song	Arne Glimcher and Robert Kraft for "Beautiful Maria of My Soul"	Nominated

== Stage play ==
The Mambo Kings inspired a musical stage play of the same name in 2005. It was produced by Daryl Roth and Jordan Roth, with lyrics by Arne Glimcher and music by Carlos Franzetti. The Mambo Kings premiered at the Golden Gate Theatre in San Francisco, California, opening on May 31, 2005. The stage version featured Esai Morales and Jaime Camil as Cesar and Nestor Castillo, with supporting performers including Christiane Noll, David Alan Grier, Cote de Pablo, Albita and Justina Machado. The production cancelled plans to open on Broadway after a critically panned tryout engagement in San Francisco.
