= Ronnie McDowell discography =

Musician's discography

- Studio albums: 23
- Live albums: 2
- Compilation albums: 6
- Singles: 51

Ronnie McDowell is an American country music artist. His discography consists of 23 studio albums and 51 singles. Of his 51 singles, 34 charted on the U.S. Billboard Hot Country Songs charts between 1977 and 1990. McDowell also has two songs that cracked the Hot 100, most notably 1977's "The King Is Gone."

== Studio albums ==
=== 1970s ===
Title	Album details	Peak positions	
Title	Album details	US Country	AUS
The King Is Gone	Release date: November 1977; Label: Scorpion Records	18	66
I Love You, I Love You, I Love You	Release date: May 1978; Label: Scorpion Records	47	—
A Tribute to the King	Release date: December 1978; Label: Scorpion Records	—	—
Rockin' You Easy, Lovin' You Slow	Release date: July 1979; Label: Epic Records	45	—
"—" denotes releases that did not chart

=== 1980s ===
Title	Album details	Peak positions
Title	Album details	US Country
Love So Many Ways	Release date: May 1980; Label: Epic Records	59
Going, Going, Gone	Release date: November 1980; Label: Epic Records	—
Good Time Lovin' Man	Release date: 1981; Label: Epic Records	6
Love to Burn	Release date: 1982; Label: Epic Records	22
Personally	Release date: March 1983; Label: Epic Records	23
Country Boy's Heart	Release date: September 1983; Label: Epic Records	56
Willing	Release date: June 1984; Label: Epic Records	33
In a New York Minute	Release date: 1985; Label: Epic Records	—
All Tied Up in Love	Release date: June 1986; Label: MCA/Curb Records	34
I'm Still Missing You	Release date: June 1988; Label: Curb Records	45
American Music	Release date: November 1988; Label: Curb Records	—
"—" denotes releases that did not chart

=== 1990s and 2000s ===
Title	Album details	Peak positions
Title	Album details	US Country
Your Precious Love	Release date: August 19, 1991; Label: Curb Records	72
When a Man Loves a Woman	Release date: January 17, 1992; Label: Curb Records	—
Country Dances	Release date: October 19, 1993; Label: Curb Records	—
Great Gospel Songs	Release date: January 9, 1996; Label: Curb Records	—
Elvis: A Tribute to the King	Release date: June 24, 1997; Label: Intersound Records	—
Country	Release date: September 17, 2002; Label: Curb Records	—
Ronnie McDowell with Bill Pinkney's Original Drifters	Release date: September 17, 2002; Label: Curb Records	—
Lost in Dirty Dancing	Release date: December 7, 2009; Label: Curb Records	—
"—" denotes releases that did not chart

== Compilation albums ==
Title	Album details	Peak positions
Title	Album details	US Country
Greatest Hits	Release date: September 1982; Label: Epic Records	—
Older Women and Other Greatest Hits	Release date: May 1987; Label: Epic Records	—
The Best of Ronnie McDowell	Release date: February 1990; Label: Curb Records	—
Unchained Melody	Release date: January 1991; Label: Curb Records	32
Greatest Hits	Release date: June 1994; Label: Curb Records	—
Now & Again: The Best of Ronnie McDowell	Release date: June 23, 1998; Label: Intersound Records	—
"—" denotes releases that did not chart

== Live albums ==
Title	Album details
Live at the Fox Theatre	Release date: August 1978; Label: Scorpion Records
Live at Church Street Station 1986	Release date: 2006; Label: Acrobat Records

== Singles ==
=== 1970s ===
Year	Title	Peak positions				Album
Year	Title	US Country	US	US AC	CAN Country	Album
1977	"Only the Lonely"	—	—	—	—	The King Is Gone
1977	"Naturally"	—	—	—	—	The King Is Gone
1977	"The King Is Gone"^{[A]}	13	13	42	8	The King Is Gone
1977	"I Love You, I Love You, I Love You"	5	81	50	5	I Love You, I Love You, I Love You
1978	"Here Comes the Reason I Live"	15	—	—	26	I Love You, I Love You, I Love You
1978	"I Just Wanted You to Know" (with The Jordanaires)	59	—	—	—	—N/a
1978	"This Is a Holdup"	39	—	—	—	—N/a
1978	"Bridge Washed Out"	—	—	—	—	—N/a
1979	"He's a Cowboy from Texas"	68	—	—	—	—N/a
1979	"World's Most Perfect Woman"	18	—	—	35	Rockin' You Easy, Lovin' You Slow
1979	"Love Me Now"	26	—	—	—	Rockin' You Easy, Lovin' You Slow
1979	"Kiss and Say Goodbye"	—	—	—	—	—N/a
1979	"Knight in Faded Blue Jeans"	—	—	—	—	—N/a
"—" denotes releases that did not chart

=== 1980s ===
Year	Title	Peak positions		Album
Year	Title	US Country	CAN Country	Album
1980	"Lovin' a Livin' Dream"	37	42	Love So Many Ways
1980	"How Far Do You Want to Go"	80	—	Love So Many Ways
1980	"Gone"	36	—	Going, Going, Gone
1980	"Wandering Eyes"	2	27	Going, Going, Gone
1981	"Older Women"	1	1	Good Time Lovin' Man
1981	"Watchin' Girls Go By"	4	3	Good Time Lovin' Man
1982	"I Just Cut Myself"	11	24	Love to Burn
1982	"Step Back"	7	—	Love to Burn
1983	"Personally"	10	11	Personally
1983	"You're Gonna Ruin My Bad Reputation"	1	1	Personally
1983	"You Made a Wanted Man of Me"	3	4	Country Boy's Heart
1984	"I Dream of Women Like You"	7	6	Country Boy's Heart
1984	"I Got a Million of 'Em"	8	4	Willing
1985	"In a New York Minute"	5	1	In a New York Minute
1985	"Love Talks"	9	14	In a New York Minute
1986	"All Tied Up"	6	1	All Tied Up in Love
1986	"When You Hurt, I Hurt"	37	—	All Tied Up in Love
1986	"Lovin' That Crazy Feelin'"	30	27	All Tied Up in Love
1987	"Make Me Late for Work Today"	55	59	—N/a
1987	"It's Only Make Believe"	8	5	I'm Still Missing You
1988	"Suspicion"	27	57	I'm Still Missing You
1989	"Never Too Old to Rock 'n' Roll" (with Jerry Lee Lewis)	50	—	I'm Still Missing You
1989	"Sea of Heartbreak"	39	—	American Music
1989	"Who'll Turn Out the Lights"	69	—	American Music
1989	"She's a Little Past Forty"	50	—	The Best of Ronnie McDowell
"—" denotes releases that did not chart

=== 1990s to 2020s ===
Year	Title	Peak positions	Album
Year	Title	US Country	Album
1990	"Sheet Music"	—	The Best of Ronnie McDowell
1990	"Paralyzed"	—	Unchained Melody
1990	"Unchained Melody"	26	Unchained Melody
1991	"Just Out of Reach"	—	Your Precious Love
1991	"When a Man Loves a Woman"	—	When a Man Loves a Woman
1992	"Hangin' Up My Heart"	—	When a Man Loves a Woman
1993	"Yippy Ti-Yi-Yo"	—	Country Dances
1994	"I'll Make Love to You"	—	—N/a
1994	"What's It Gonna Take"	—	Greatest Hits
1997	"Love Me Tender" (with The Elvis Originals)	—	Elvis: A Tribute to a King
1997	"Tupelo's Too Far" (with The Elvis Originals)	—	Elvis: A Tribute to a King
2008	"Hey Mr. Oilman"	—	—N/a
2009	"Lost In Dirty Dancing"	—	Lost In Dirty Dancing
2025	"Thing About Texas" (with Rodney Collins & Johnny Rodriguez)	—	—N/a
"—" denotes releases that did not chart

== Charted B-sides ==
Year	Title	Peak positions		Original A-side
Year	Title	US Country	CAN Country	Original A-side
1978	"Animal" (with The Jordanaires)	68	—	"I Just Wanted You to Know"
1980	"Never Seen a Mountain So High"	29	25	"Love Me Now"
1988	"I'm Still Missing You"	36	44	"Suspicion"
"—" denotes releases that did not chart

== Notes ==
- A "The King Is Gone" also peaked at number 16 on the RPM Top Singles chart and at number 4 on the RPM Adult Contemporary Tracks chart in Canada.
