= New World (Karla Bonoff album) =

Studio album by Karla Bonoff
- Released: 1988
- Recorded: Alpha Studios, Burbank, California
- Genres: Pop rock; adult contemporary
- Length: 43:03
- Label: Gold Castle
- Producer: Mark Goldenberg

Karla Bonoff chronology
| Wild Heart of the Young (1982) | New World (1988) |

Professional ratings
Review scores
| Source | Rating |
|---|---|
| AllMusic | 3/5 stars |
| The Encyclopedia of Popular Music | 2/5 stars |
| MusicHound Rock: The Essential Album Guide | 3.5/5 stars |

New World is the fourth album by the singer/songwriter Karla Bonoff and her first in six years since 1982's Wild Heart of the Young.

In 1989, Linda Ronstadt included three of Bonoff's compositions, "All My Life", "Trouble Again" and "Goodbye My Friend" on her Cry Like a Rainstorm, Howl Like the Wind album which featured Aaron Neville. Ronstadt and Neville's cover of "All My Life", won a Grammy for Best Pop Performance by a Duo or Group with Vocal at the 33rd Annual Grammy Awards. In 1993, Wynonna Judd had a country music hit with Bonoff's "Tell Me Why" featured on her album of the same name on which Bonoff played guitar and sang backing vocals.

In 2023, "Way of the Heart" was featured in the 11th episode of And Just Like That... season 2 "The Last Supper Part Two: Entrée" where it was played during Carrie Bradshaw's (Sarah Jessica Parker) dinner party.

== Critical reception ==
AllMusic's William Ruhlmann noted retrospectively that with this album Karla Bonoff "once again demonstrated her talent for plaintive romantic ballads." MusicHound Rock: The Essential Album Guide wrote that the album "contains Bonoff's best batch of songs since her debut." The Washington Post wrote that Bonoff "still creates sweet, simple melodies, and sings them with purity and sincerity, but they are sabotaged by vaporous lyrics that don't develop much beyond repeating titles like 'Tell Me Why' and 'Still Be Getting Over You.'"

== Track listing ==
All songs written by Karla Bonoff, except where noted.

| No. | Title | Writer(s) | Length |
|---|---|---|---|
| 1. | "How Long" | Andrew Williams, David Williams | 4:10 |
| 2. | "New World" | | 4:57 |
| 3. | "Tell Me Why" | | 3:40 |
| 4. | "All My Life" | | 3:51 |
| 5. | "Goodbye My Friend" | | 3:46 |
| 6. | "Way of the Heart" | | 4:30 |
| 7. | "The Best Part of You" | | 4:30 |
| 8. | "Still Be Getting Over You" | | 4:13 |
| 9. | "Oh Mary" | | 4:36 |
| 10. | "All Walk Alone" | Bonoff, Michael Ruff | 4:50 |

== Personnel ==
- Karla Bonoff – lead vocals, backing vocals, keyboards, acoustic guitar
- Mark Goldenberg – keyboards, programming, guitars, bass (1, 4-10)
- Peter Frampton – acoustic guitar (2), guitar solo (3, 8)
- Jennifer Condos – bass (2, 3)
- Debra Dobkin – percussion (2, 4, 6, 8)
- Kenny Edwards – backing vocals (3)
- Karen Blake – backing vocals (3)

=== Production ===
- Mark Goldenberg – producer
- Larry Hinds – recording, mixing
- Stephen Marcussen – mastering at Precision Lacquer (Hollywood, California)
- Claudia Kunin – photography
- Alana Coghlan & Associates – design
- Michael Solomon – management
