= Wild Heart of the Young =

Studio album by Karla Bonoff
- Released: March 1982
- Studios: Wilder Bros. Studios (Los Angeles, California); Sunset Sound (Hollywood, California); Santa Barbara Sound Design (Santa Barbara, California)
- Genres: Folk rock, pop rock, easy listening, adult contemporary
- Length: 37:56
- Label: Columbia
- Producer: Kenny Edwards

Karla Bonoff chronology
Restless Nights (1979)	Wild Heart of the Young (1982)	New World (1988)

Wild Heart of the Young is the third album by singer/songwriter Karla Bonoff. The album includes Bonoff's only Top 40 hit, "Personally", which peaked at No. 19 on the Billboard singles chart. It was not written by Bonoff.

== Reception ==
Professional ratings
Review scores
Source	Rating
AllMusic	2/5 stars
Rolling Stone	3/5 stars

Rolling Stone's Stephen Holden notes that with this album Bonoff "has finally stopped playing the role of the passive loser…" and "strengthened her style to the point that she no longer sounds like an all-too-willing victim of love." He relates that "[i]n her finest performance, she turns Paul Kelly's "Personally,"… into a sly tour de force of sexual tease." And concludes of the album that "at its best it says goodbye to the smoggy, posh romanticism of Seventies L.A. with a confident kick of the heels."

AllMusic's William Ruhlmann retrospectively describes "Personally" as "a coy and catchy pop song utterly uncharacteristic of Bonoff's other work." He opines that "Bonoff's original songs, which made up the bulk of the album, simply were not up to the standard set by her debut, and Wild Heart Of The Young was the weakest of her three Columbia Records albums."

== Track listing ==
All songs written by Karla Bonoff, except where noted.

No.	Title	Writer(s)	Length
1.	"Personally"	Paul Kelly	3:37
2.	"Please Be the One"		4:07
3.	"I Don't Want to Miss You"		4:29
4.	"Even If"		4:05
5.	"Just Walk Away"		4:15
6.	"Gonna Be Mine"	Bonoff, Kenny Edwards	3:59
7.	"Wild Heart of the Young"		4:51
8.	"It Just Takes One"		4:41
9.	"Dream"		3:52

== Charts ==
=== Weekly charts ===
Chart (1982)	Peak position
US Billboard 200	49

=== Year End Charts ===
Year End Chart (1982)	Peak position
U.S. Billboard 200	83

=== Charting singles ===
Single	Chart	Position
Personally	U.S. Billboard Hot 100	19
Personally	U.S. Billboard Adult Contemporary	3
Please Be The One	U.S. Billboard Hot 100	63
Please Be The One	U.S. Billboard Adult Contemporary	22

== Personnel ==
- Karla Bonoff – lead vocals, electric guitars (2, 8), acoustic piano (3, 5, 7), acoustic guitar (4, 9), backing vocals (5, 7, 9)
- Mark T. Jordan

– organ (1)

- Hawk Wolinski – organ (1–3), electric piano (4), synthesizers (5)
- Bill Payne – synthesizers (4, 5, 7), organ (6)
- Andrew Gold – guitars (1, 3, 6), percussion (1), electric piano (2, 9), electric guitars (2), backing vocals (3, 4, 8), organ (8)
- Danny Kortchmar – guitars (1, 5, 6), electric guitars (4, 8, 9)
- Ira Ingber – electric guitars (2), guitars (7)
- Joe Walsh – electric guitars (8)
- Waddy Wachtel – electric guitars (9)
- Bob Glaub – bass guitar, guitars (6)
- Russ Kunkel – drums, percussion (2)
- Steve Forman – percussion (2, 3, 6)
- Victor Feldman – vibraphone (7)
- Phil Kenzie – saxophone (1)
- David Sanborn – saxophone (5)
- Don Henley – backing vocals (1)
- Timothy B. Schmit – backing vocals (1)
- Kenny Edwards – backing vocals (3, 4, 7–9), electric guitars (4)
- Brock Walsh – backing vocals (3, 8)
- Wendy Waldman – backing vocals (4)
- JD Souther – backing vocals (7)

=== Production ===
- Kenny Edwards – producer
- Allan Blazek – recording
- Jim Isaacson – recording, mixing
- Jim Nipar – recording, mixing
- Ray Blair – recording assistant
- James Geddes – recording assistant
- Dennis Kirk – recording assistant
- James Ledner – recording assistant
- Stephen McManus – recording assistant
- Andrew Gold – additional mixing
- Bobby Hata – mastering at Amigo Studios (North Hollywood, California)
- Liz Heller – production assistant
- Jodie Lunine – production assistant
- Jimmy Wachtel – art direction, design
- Randee St. Nicholas – photography
- Gloria Von Jansky – hand lettering
- Norman Epstein – management
