= Paul Kelly (American musician) =

American singer-songwriter (born 1940)

- Born: Paul Laurence Dunbar Kelly; June 19, 1940 (age 86); Overtown, Miami, Florida, United States
- Died: Ruby, South Carolina
- Genres: Folk, R&B, soul
- Occupations: Musician, singer-songwriter, producer
- Instruments: Vocals, guitar, piano
- Years active: 1956–2012

Paul Kelly (born June 19, 1940) is an American singer-songwriter. He is best known for the soul songs "Stealing in the Name of the Lord", which was a major hit in 1970, and "Hooked, Hogtied & Collared". He also wrote "Personally", which has been widely covered, and was a hit for soul singer Jackie Moore and singer-songwriter Karla Bonoff and country singer Ronnie McDowell. Other songs have been covered by gospel artists, including the Mighty Clouds of Joy and The Staple Singers.

== Early life ==
Kelly was born in Overtown Miami, Florida, the fourth of six siblings. Kelly was brought up by his grandmother. In about 1956, Kelly's brother Henry formed a vocal group, with Paul as lead vocalist. It only lasted a few months, before Henry left Miami to go to college. Paul then formed a group with school friends from 20th Street School—The Spades, later known as The Valadeers. Another member was Jimmy Cherry, who later sang with The Fantastics.

== Solo career ==
In 1960, Kelly left the group to go solo, recording the standard, "I'll String Along with You" for Dade Records, which was never released, following a dispute between Kelly and the label.

A Miami-based singer-songwriter/producer, Clarence Reid (who would later perform as Blowfly), heard Kelly rehearse, and asked him to fill in on lead vocals with his group, The Delmiros, whose lead singer had laryngitis. Kelly recorded a single, "Down with It, Can't Quit It"/"Sooner Or Later", which was released on Selma Records in 1963, under the name Clarence Reid & The Delmiros. Kelly began performing the song live in clubs and became associated with the song. Reid asked him to join The Delmiros on a permanent basis.

Kelly's official debut solo single, "It's My Baby" b/w "The Upset," appeared on the Lloyd label in 1965. It was inspired by the surprise boxing victory of Cassius Clay over Sonny Liston. A second single, "Chills and Fever," written by Clarence Reid and Willie Clarke, was picked up by Dial Records and distributed by Atlantic. Relations between Kelly and Reid became strained. Nashville producer Buddy Killen, who had also fallen out with Reid, approached Kelly about working together. Meanwhile, Lloyd Records issued an answer record, "Thrills and Chills", by Helene Smith. Kelly released a third single, "Since I Found You" under the name Paul Kelly & the Rocketeers.

After this, Kelly released four singles on Philips Records, produced by Killen in Muscle Shoals, including a ballad, "Nine Out of Ten Times," written by Kelly, Reid and Clarke). Meanwhile, Dial had released two singles by Joe Tex, one of which,"We're Gonna Make It," was co-written with Kelly. At the time, Kelly often opened for Tex on tour.

In 1967, Kelly decided to move to Brooklyn, New York City, and invited a songwriting collaborator, Juanita Rogers, to join him. They became a couple and moved in together. Kelly cut material in 1968 for Stan Watson's Philly Groove label, but it remains unissued.

== "Stealing in the Name of the Lord" ==
Kelly wrote "Stealing in the Name of the Lord", with Sam & Dave in mind. However, Sam Moore, whom he had known in Miami, rejected it.

The song, whose title references "Papa Was a Rollin' Stone", tackles the hypocrisy of church leaders. It includes the lines:

Oh, oh, oh.
It's happenin' every day.
This man, he'll walk,
Up to ya,
And look ya in the eye,
Put his hand,
On your shoulder,
And tell ya,
A big fat lie.

He'll tell ya,
God's gonna bless ya, children,
If you put your faith in me.
Huh!

"That's been my way of thinking all the time," Kelly said about the song. "Thinking about what's wrong with [the] church... And what they talk about and what they do are two different things..."

Kelly sold the rights to the song to Buddy Killen, and recorded it at Muscle Shoals. Killen got it released through the Hollywood-based Happy Tiger Records. However, R&B radio stations were worried that the song would offend sponsors, such as those on gospel shows. The record was consequently slow to take off.

Around the same time, Annette Snell, recording as Annetta, released "Since There Is No More of You," a single written by Kelly, who sang background on the release.

"Stealing" received a push from Jerry "Swamp Dogg" Williams Jr., who was about to undertake a promotional visit to Baltimore Along with Kelly, he visited a WWIN radio DJ, Rockin' Robin. Although Kelly was now trying to push the b-side, "The Day After Forever", Rockin' Robin liked "Stealing," and played it several times in a row. As Kelly recalled, "Everybody started calling in and I never looked back after that." The single first appeared on the Cashbox R&B charts on June 13, 1970, and in Billboard a week later. It peaked at No. 5 (Cashbox) and No. 14 on Billboard's Best Selling Soul Singles chart and No. 49 on the Hot 100.

The song was covered by Thelma Houston on her eponymous 1972 album, Thelma Houston.

The song also became popular in England's Northern Soul club scene and in the 1980s became the basis for a song of the same name by an English post-punk band, Yeah Yeah Noh.

Despite Kelly's stand in the lyrics of "Stealing in the Name of the Lord", another of his songs, "God Can", has been recorded by the Staple Singers, the Mighty Clouds of Joy and Dorothy Norwood. Mavis Staples, also cut solo versions of Kelly's "We Got Love" and "I've Been to the Well Before" songs on her 1979 solo album, Oh What a Feeling (produced by Jerry Wexler and Barry Beckett).

== The 1970s and 1980s ==
In the wake of Kelly's major hit, Happy Tiger quickly released an album and three singles, but the label was in financial trouble and went out of business in 1971. Kelly was signed by Warner Bros. Records, which reissued the Happy Tiger album in 1972 as Dirt, taking the name from the single, "(He Ain't Nothin' But) Dirt". Kelly's third Warner Bros. Records single, "Don't Burn Me" (1972), was also a minor hit. It was followed by an album of the same name.

A 1974 single, "Hooked, Hogtied & Collared" was his second biggest self-recorded hit, and it too inspired an album by the same name, with controversial artwork—a drawing depicting bondage.

With disco on the rise, Warner Bros. Records forced out Kelly's preferred producer, Buddy Killen. Kelly recorded with Gene Page (Barry White's co-arranger), but the material was never released. These events signaled a more general disagreement between Kelly and his record company, and the relationship was terminated. After a single for Epic Records, "Everybody Got a Jones"/"Shake Your Mind", Kelly decided to concentrate on songwriting and production. He did not perform live after 1977.

At around this time, Kelly also wrote a song called "Personally", which he gave to Jackie Moore. Although it was not a major hit for her, Karla Bonoff recorded the song in 1982 and scored a No. 19 pop hit. Kelly recorded "Personally" on his 1993 Gonna Stick and Stay album.)

In 1983, Kelly started his own independent label, Laurence Records, using the pseudonym "Laurence Dunbar". The label had a minor hit with "Bring It on Home to Me", sung by Carol Dennis and written and produced by Kelly, in 1984/85. (He wound up the label in 1991.)

In the late 1980s, Kelly and his family moved from Brooklyn to Ruby, South Carolina. Kelly continued to send out demos to labels.

== Return to recording ==
Kelly recorded an album, Gonna Stick and Stay, in New Orleans in July–August 1992.

In 1994, he suffered a heart failure and another in 1995, as well as a stroke. His vocal range suffered as a result of his health problems, which also caused Kelly to become a vegetarian.

Warner Bros. Records issued a 1996 CD titled The Best of Paul Kelly as part of their Warner Archives series.

Kelly recorded the 1998 album Let's Celebrate Life in South Carolina and released it on Ripete Records. It included a remake of "Stealing in the Name of the Lord".

In late 2011, Kelly released an album titled 1984, containing unreleased songs he recorded in that year.
