= Karla Bonoff (album) =

Studio album by Karla Bonoff
- Released: 1977
- Recorded: The Sound Factory, Los Angeles
- Genre: Folk rock, pop rock, easy listening, adult contemporary
- Length: 37:36
- Label: Columbia
- Producer: Kenny Edwards

Karla Bonoff chronology
Karla Bonoff (1977)	Restless Nights (1979)

Karla Bonoff is the RIAA Gold-certified first album by singer/songwriter Karla Bonoff. It includes several of Bonoff's compositions which had previously been prominently recorded: three by Linda Ronstadt ("Lose Again", "If He's Ever Near", "Someone to Lay Down Beside Me") and one by Bonnie Raitt ("Home").

== Reception ==
Professional ratings
Review scores
Source	Rating
AllMusic	4.5/5 stars
Christgau's Record Guide	B−
The Rolling Stone Record Guide	3/5 stars

Rolling Stone's Stephen Holden called the album an impressive debut marred only by comparisons to Linda Ronstadt, writing that "Bonoff's approach is softer, plainer and more tentative." He concluded that the "consistency of the material confirms a major writing talent; the performances show a promising singer."

AllMusic's William Ruhlmann noted retrospectively that, "despite Bonoff's competent singing, which actually better accentuated the lyrics of her songs than Ronstadt's, it was hard for her to get out from under the shadow of the members of her peer group who had preceded her."

== Track listing ==
All songs written by Karla Bonoff, except where noted.

No.	Title	Writer(s)	Length
1.	"Someone to Lay Down Beside Me"		4:06
2.	"I Can't Hold On"		3:15
3.	"Lose Again"		3:42
4.	"Home"		4:19
5.	"Faces in the Wind"	Craig Safan	3:07
6.	"Isn't It Always Love"		3:08
7.	"If He's Ever Near"		3:17
8.	"Flying High"	Steve Ferguson	3:29
9.	"Falling Star"		4:30
10.	"Rose in the Garden"		4:43

== Personnel ==
- Karla Bonoff – vocals, acoustic piano (1, 3, 5, 10), backing vocals (2, 6, 8), acoustic guitar (7, 8, 9)
- Jai Winding – acoustic piano (7)
- Waddy Wachtel – guitars (1), electric guitar (2, 6, 10) backing vocals (6)
- Andrew Gold – lead guitar (2), electric guitar (2), backing vocals (2), acoustic guitar (4, 10), acoustic piano (4), clavinet (5), electric piano (6), harmonium (9)
- Kenny Edwards – acoustic guitar (2, 4, 9), mandolin (4), backing vocals (4, 7, 8, 10), bass (5, 7–10), electric guitar (8)
- Dan Dugmore – steel guitar (4, 5, 8)
- Leland Sklar – bass (1, 2, 6)
- Emory Gordy Jr. – bass (4)
- Russ Kunkel – drums (1, 2, 6)
- John Ware – drums (4)
- Mike Botts – drums (5, 8, 10)
- Steve Forman – percussion (1, 2, 6)
- Greg Ladanyi – finger cymbals (5)
- David Campbell – string arrangements and conductor
- Linda Ronstadt – backing vocals (4, 10)
- Brock Walsh – backing vocals (4)
- Wendy Waldman – backing vocals (5, 6)
- Glenn Frey – backing vocals (7)
- JD Souther – backing vocals (7)

=== Production ===
- Kenny Edwards – producer
- Dennis Kirk – engineer
- Greg Ladanyi – engineer
- Michael McGinnis – assistant engineer
- Sergio Reyes – assistant engineer
- Bernie Grundman – mastering at A&M Studios (Hollywood, California)
- Tommy Steele – design
- Ethan Russell – photography
