= Step Back =

Step Back may refer to:

- Step-back or setback, in architecture, a step-like recession in a wall
- Step Back (album) by Johnny Winter, 2014
- "Step Back" (Ronnie McDowell song), 1982
- "Step Back"/"Slide", a single by Superheist, 2001
- "Step Back", a song by Candlebox from Happy Pills, 1998
- "Step Back" (Got the Beat song), 2022
- Step-back jump shot, a basketball move
