= Personally =

Personally may refer to:

- "Personally" (P-Square song), 2013
- "Personally" (Karla Bonoff song), 1982
