= American Music =

American Music may refer to:

- American Music (journal), replaced by the Journal of the Society for American Music, published by Cambridge University Press
- American Music: Off the Record, a 2008 American documentary film
- American Music Records, a jazz record label 1944–1957

== Albums ==
- American Music (album), by the Blasters, or the title song, 1980
- American Music, by Gangstagrass, 2015
- American Music, by Ronnie McDowell, 1988

== Songs ==
- "American Music", by the Pointer Sisters from So Excited!, 1982
- "American Music", by Violent Femmes from Why Do Birds Sing?, 1991
