= All Tied Up (disambiguation) =

All Tied Up is a 1994 movie.

All Tied Up may also refer to:

- "All Tied Up" (song), by Ronnie McDowell
- "All Tied Up", a song by Robin Thicke from Love After War
