= I Got a Million of 'Em =

Single by Ronnie McDowell

from the album Willing
- B-side: "My Baby Don't Wear No Pajamas"
- Released: June 23, 1984
- Genre: Country
- Length: 2:52
- Label: Epic
- Songwriter(s): Ron Hellard, Michael Garvin, Bucky Jones
- Producer(s): Buddy Killen

Ronnie McDowell singles chronology
"I Dream of Women Like You" (1984)	"I Got a Million of 'Em" (1984)	"In a New York Minute" (1985)

"I Got a Million of 'Em" is a song written by Ron Hellard, Michael Garvin and Bucky Jones, and recorded by American country music artist Ronnie McDowell. It was released in June 1984 as the first single from the album Willing. The song reached #8 on the Billboard Hot Country Singles & Tracks chart.

== Chart performance ==
Chart (1984)	Peak position
US Hot Country Songs (Billboard)	8
Canadian RPM Country Tracks	4
