= Restless Nights (Karla Bonoff album) =

Studio album by Karla Bonoff
- Released: September 1979
- Studios: The Sound Factory (Los Angeles, California)
- Genres: Pop, MOR
- Length: 37:19
- Label: Columbia
- Producer: Kenny Edwards

Karla Bonoff chronology
Karla Bonoff (1977)	Restless Nights (1979)	Wild Heart of the Young (1982)

Restless Nights is the second album by singer/songwriter Karla Bonoff. The album peaked at No. 31 on the Billboard albums chart and number 66 on the Australian Kent Music Report.

== Reception ==
Professional ratings
Review scores
Source	Rating
AllMusic	3/5 stars

Rolling Stone's Don Shewey dismissed Bonoff's work as "sappy, MOR schlock," but noted that "Trouble Again" and "Baby Don't Go" are "fast, fun and disposable — i.e., everything a pop single should be... The remainder of Restless Nights is insufferable sludge." The New York Times called Restless Nights "one of the most lovely albums of the year," writing that the songs "are sung with elegance, and their instrumental support is similarly pristine."

AllMusic's William Ruhlmann retrospectively called "Trouble Again" "a gem (as Linda Ronstadt proved when she recorded it)" but concluded that the album "did not represent the leap that would have been required to vault Bonoff into the ranks of her star friends."

== Track listing ==
All songs written by Karla Bonoff, except where noted.

No.	Title	Writer(s)	Length
1.	"Trouble Again"	Bonoff, Kenny Edwards	3:37
2.	"Restless Nights"		5:18
3.	"The Letter"		2:47
4.	"When You Walk in the Room"	Jackie DeShannon	3:00
5.	"Only a Fool"		6:07
6.	"Baby Don't Go"	Bonoff, Kenny Edwards	3:19
7.	"Never Stop Her Heart"		4:49
8.	"Loving You"		3:26
9.	"The Water Is Wide"	Traditional	4:56

== Personnel ==
- Karla Bonoff – vocals, backing vocals (1, 4, 7, 8), acoustic guitar (1, 2, 4–7, 9), acoustic piano (8)
- Don Grolnick – acoustic piano (1, 4), electric piano (3, 5)
- Andrew Gold – electric piano (2), electric guitar (6, 7), percussion (6), backing vocals (6)
- Garth Hudson – accordion (9)
- Dan Dugmore – electric guitar (1, 4)
- Waddy Wachtel – electric guitar (1, 4, 6, 7)
- Danny Kortchmar – electric guitar (2, 8)
- David Lindley – acoustic guitar (5)
- Ed Black – electric guitar (8)
- James Taylor – acoustic guitar (9), backing vocals (9)
- Kenny Edwards – bass guitar (1, 2, 4–9), backing vocals (1, 6, 8)
- Russ Kunkel – drums (1, 4, 5)
- Rick Marotta – drums (2, 6–8)
- Steve Forman – percussion (1, 7)
- David Campbell – string arrangements and conductor
- Don Henley – backing vocals (2)
- JD Souther – backing vocals (2, 9)
- Jackie DeShannon – backing vocals (4)
- Wendy Waldman – backing vocals (7)

Production

- Kenny Edwards – producer
- Greg Ladanyi – recording, mixing
- Jim Nipar – recording
- Ernie Sheesley – assistant engineer
- Bernie Grundman – mastering at A&M Studios (Hollywood, California)
- Melanie McDowell – production assistant
- John Kosh – art direction, design
- Aaron Rapoport – photography
