= I Just Cut Myself =

Single by Ronnie McDowell

from the album Love to Burn
- B-side: "World's Greatest Lover"
- Released: May 8, 1982
- Genre: Country
- Length: 3:51
- Label: Epic
- Songwriter(s): Chance Jones, Mike Lantrip
- Producer(s): Buddy Killen

Ronnie McDowell singles chronology
"Watchin' Girls Go By" (1981)	"I Just Cut Myself" (1982)	"Step Back" (1982)

"I Just Cut Myself" is a song recorded by American country music artist Ronnie McDowell. It was released in May 1982 as the first single from the album Love to Burn. The song reached #11 on the Billboard Hot Country Singles & Tracks chart. The song was written by Chance Jones and Mike Lantrip.

== Chart performance ==
Chart (1982)	Peak position
US Hot Country Songs (Billboard)	11
Canadian RPM Country Tracks	24
