= Wendy Waldman =

American singer, songwriter, and record producer (born 1950)

- Born: Wendy Steiner; November 29, 1950 (age 75); Los Angeles, California
- Genres: Rock, pop, country
- Occupations: Singer-songwriter, record producer
- Instruments: Guitar, keyboards, dulcimer
- Years active: 1970–present
- Labels: Warner Bros., Epic, Cypress
- Formerly of: Bryndle, The Refugees
- Website: wendywaldmanmusic.com

Wendy Waldman (born Wendy Steiner; November 29, 1950) is an American singer, songwriter, and record producer.

== Biography ==
=== Early life ===
Waldman grew up in the Los Angeles area and was raised in a musical environment. Her father Fred Steiner was a composer who wrote the theme music for Perry Mason and The Rocky and Bullwinkle Show; her mother was a professional violinist.

In 1969 she married her first husband, Ken Waldman, and changed her name to Wendy Waldman.

=== Bryndle ===
Waldman's first recordings were made in 1970 as a part of Bryndle. Other group members included Karla Bonoff, Andrew Gold, and Kenny Edwards. When the group disbanded, she signed with Warner Bros. Records. Bryndle re-formed in the early 1990s and released two albums before disbanding again in the mid 2000s.

=== Recordings ===
Waldman released her first album, Love Has Got Me, in 1973 and Rolling Stone named her "singer-songwriter debut of the year." The same year, Maria Muldaur covered two of Waldman's songs on her self-titled first album.

She followed her debut album with Gypsy Symphony in 1974, Wendy Waldman in 1975, The Main Refrain (1976), and Strange Company in 1978.

In 1982, Waldman released Which Way to Main Street, which featured Peter Frampton on guitar.

=== Songwriting ===
Waldman left the Warner Bros. label in 1979. In 1982, she moved to Nashville to focus on songwriting.

The songwriting team of Waldman, Phil Galdston, and Jon Lind wrote "Save the Best for Last" for Vanessa Williams, which was nominated for a Grammy. They have also written songs made popular by artists such as Madonna, Celine Dion, and Earth, Wind & Fire.

The song "Fishin' in the Dark" was written by Waldman and Jim Photoglo. It was a hit in 1987 for the Nitty Gritty Dirt Band and has also been covered by Garth Brooks and Kenny Chesney.

=== Production ===
Waldman has been one of only a few women who produce records in a male-dominated profession.

=== The Refugees ===
In 2007, Waldman formed The Refugees with Cidny Bullens and Deborah Holland.

== Discography ==
=== Studio recordings ===
- 1973: Love Has Got Me (Warner Bros.)
- 1974: Gypsy Symphony (Warner Bros.)
- 1975: Wendy Waldman (Warner Bros.)
- 1976: The Main Refrain (Warner Bros.)
- 1978: Strange Company (Warner Bros.)
- 1982: Which Way to Main Street (Epic)
- 1987: Letters Home (Cypress)
- 1996: The Mountains (FirstCom)
- 1997: City of Dreams (FirstCom)
- 2007: My Time in the Desert (Longhouse)

=== Compilations ===
- 1996: Love Is the Only Goal: The Best of Wendy Waldman (Warner Archives)
- 2003: Seeds and Orphans (Longhouse)
- 2009: Seeds and Orphans, Vol. 2 (Longhouse)
- 2012: Back By Fall: A Retrospective (Longhouse)

=== Singles ===
- 1975: "Western Lullaby" / "Green Rocky Road" (Warner Bros.)
- 1976: "Living Is Good" / "The Main Refrain" (Warner Bros.)
- 1978: "Long Hot Summer Nights" / "You'll See" (Warner Bros.)
- 1982: "Does Anybody Want to Marry Me" (Epic)
- 1982: "Heartbeat" (Epic)
- 1987: "Living in Hard Times" (Cypress)

=== As a member of Bryndle ===
- 1995: Bryndle (MusicMasters)
- 2002: House of Silence (self-released)

=== As a member of the Refugees ===
- 2009: Unbound (Wabuho)
- 2012: Three (Wabuho)
- 2019: How Far It Goes (Wabuho)
- 2023: “California” (Wabuho)

=== As composer ===
==== 1973 – 1981 ====
- 1973: Maria Muldaur – Maria Muldaur (Reprise) – track 10, "Vaudeville Man"; track 11, "Mad Mad Me"
- 1974: El Chicano – Cinco (MCA) – track 7, "Gringo En Mexico"
- 1974: Maria Muldaur – Waitress in a Donut Shop (Reprise) – track 2, "Gringo En Mexico"
- 1975: Judy Collins – Judith (Elektra) – track 11, "Pirate Ships"
- 1976: Barbi Benton – Something New (Playboy) – track 11, "Thinking of You"
- 1976: Maria Muldaur – Sweet Harmony (Reprise) – track 7, "Back by Fall"; track 9, "Wild Bird"
- 1976: Twiggy – Twiggy (Mercury) – track 8, "Vaudeville Man"
- 1980: Randy Meisner – One More Song (Epic) – track 2, "Gotta Get Away"; track 3, "Come on Back to Me"; track 5, "I Need You Bad"; track 7, "Trouble Ahead" (all songs co-written with Eric Kaz and Randy Meisner)
- 1981: Kim Carnes – Mistaken Identity (EMI America) – track 6, "Break The Rules Tonite (Out of School)" (co-written with Dave Ellingson and Kim Carnes); track 7, "Still Hold On" (co-written with Dave Ellingson, Eric Kaz, and Kim Carnes)
- 1981: Albert Hammond – Your World and My World (Columbia) – track 8, "Take Me Sailing"
- 1981: Patti Austin – Every Home Should Have One (Qwest) – track 3, "The Way I Feel" (co-written with Eric Kaz)

==== 1982 – present ====
- 1982: Crystal Gayle – True Love (Elektra) – track 4, "Baby What About You" (co-written with Josh Leo)
- 1982: Johnny Van Zant – The Last of the Wild Ones (Polydor) – track 4, "Still Hold On" (co-written with Dave Ellingson, Eric Kaz, and Kim Carnes)
- 1983: Helen Reddy - Imagination (MCA) Side Two, track 2, "The Way I Feel" (co-written with Eric Kaz)
- 1983: Helen Reddy - Imagination (MCA) Side Two, track 5, "Heartbeat" (co-written with Eric Kaz)
- 1985: Kenny Rogers – Love Is What We Make It (Liberty) – track 3, "Still Hold On" (co-written with Dave Ellingson, Eric Kaz, and Kim Carnes)
- 1985: Steve Wariner – Life's Highway (MCA) – track 5, "In Love And Out of Danger" (co-written with Craig Bickhardt)
- 1986: The Kendalls – Fire at First Sight (MCA) – track 4, "I'll Take You (Heartache And All)" (co-written with Donnie Lowery)
- 1986: Reba McEntire – Whoever's in New England (MCA) – track 1, "Can't Stop Now" (co-written with Gary Nicholson)
- 1987: Don Johnson – Heartbeat (Epic) – track 1, "Heartbeat" (co-written with Eric Kaz)
- 1987: Jesse Colin Young – The Highway Is For Heroes (Cypress) – track 1, "The Highway Is For Heroes" (co-written with Jesse Colin Young)
- 1988: Bette Midler – Beaches (Original Soundtrack Recording) (Atlantic) – track 9, "Oh Industry" (co-written with Bette Midler)
- 1988: Highway 101 – 101² (Warner Bros.) – track 2, "Road To Your Heart" (co-written with Jim Photoglo and Josh Leo)
- 1988: Tuck & Patti – Tears of Joy (Windham Hill Jazz) – track 9, "Mad Mad Me"
- 1991: Cher – Love Hurts (Geffen) – track 7, "One Small Step" (co-written with Barry Mann and Brad Parker)
- 1993: The Hooters – Out of Body (MCA) – track 4, "Great Big American Car" (co-written with Eric Bazilian and Rob Hyman)
- 2001: Alison Krauss & Union Station – New Favorite (Rounder) – track 7, "I'm Gone" (co-written with Eric Kaz)
- 2008: Sonny Landreth – From the Reach (Landfall) – track 7, "The Goin' On" (co-written with Sonny Landreth)
- 2009: Nicole Dillenberg – The Heart of the Matter (self-released) – track 4, "Over YouKeane"
- 2010: Cindy Bullens – Howling Trains and Barking Dogs (MCD Records) – track 5, "All My Angels" (co-written with Cindy Bullens)
- 2010: John Cowan – The Massenburg Sessions (e1) – track 1, "My Time in the Desert/Maggie Little" (co-written with Sally Barris and Shad Cobb)
- 2015: Home Free – Country Evolution (Columbia) – track 8, "Fishing in the Dark (co-written with Jim Photoglo)

=== As producer ===
- 1988: The Forester Sisters – Sincerely (Warner Bros.)
- 1988: Suzy Bogguss – Somewhere Between (Capitol)
- 1989: Jonathan Edwards – Natural Thing (MCA / Curb)
- 1989: New Grass Revival – (Friday Night in America (Capitol)
- 1990: Matraca Berg – Lying to the Moon (RCA)
- 1992: Mitsou – Heading West (Tox) – track 2, "Heading West"
- 1993: Rick Vincent – A Wanted Man (Curb)
- 2005: Arthur Lee Land – Dragonfly (Perfect Groove)
- 2007: Artie Traum – Thief of Time (Roaring Stream)
- 2012: Lisa Haley – Joy Ride (Blue Fiddle)
- 2014: various artists – Looking into You: A Tribute to Jackson Browne (Music Road) – track 2-04, "Something Fine"

=== Also appears on ===
==== 1973 – 1979 ====
- 1973: Linda Ronstadt – Don't Cry Now (Asylum) – backing vocals 'Don't Cry Now'
- 1974: Linda Ronstadt – Heart Like a Wheel (Capitol) – backing vocals on track 2, "It Doesn't Matter Anymore"
- 1976: Maria Muldaur - Sweet Harmony (Warner Bros.) backing vocals
- 1976: Al Kooper – Act Like Nothing's Wrong (United Artists) – backing vocals
- 1976: Linda Ronstadt – Hasten Down the Wind (Asylum) – backing vocals
- 1977: Karla Bonoff – Karla Bonoff (Columbia) – backing vocals
- 1977: Tim Moore – White Shadows (Asylum) – backing vocals
- 1978: Maria Muldaur - Southern Winds (Warner Bros.) – backing vocals
- 1979: Maria Muldaur - Open Your Eyes (Warner Bros.) - backing vocals
- 1979: Karla Bonoff – Restless Nights (Columbia) – backing vocals

==== 1980 – present ====
- 1980: Bob Welch – Man Overboard (Capitol) – backing vocals
- 1980: Bette Midler – In Harmony: A Sesame Street Record (Warner Bros.) – backing vocals on 'Blueberry Pie'
- 1980: Amy Holland – Amy Holland (Capitol) – backing vocals
- 1980: Randy Meisner – One More Song (Epic) – guitar, vocals on track 3, "Come on Back To Me"
- 1980: John Stewart – Dream Babies Go Hollywood (RSO Records) – backing vocals
- 1980 Linda Ronstadt "Live In Hollywood" (RHINO) -HBO TV Special -backing vocals
- 1982: Karla Bonoff – Wild Heart of the Young (Columbia) – backing vocals
- 1982: Nicolette Larson – All Dressed Up and No Place to Go (Warner Bros.) – backing vocals
- 1983: Melissa Manchester – Emergency (Arista) – backing vocals
- 1983: Randy Newman – Trouble in Paradise (Warner Bros.) – backing vocals
- 1984: Jimmy Buffett – Riddles in the Sand (MCA) – backing vocals
- 1984: Reba McEntire – My Kind of Country (MCA) – backing vocals
- 1985: Dobie Gray – From Where I Stand (Capitol) – backing vocals
- 1985: Jimmy Buffett – Last Mango in Paris (MCA) – backing vocals
- 1985: Hank Williams Jr. – Five-O (Warner Bros.) – backing vocals
- 1985: Rick Cua – You're My Road (Sparrow) - vocals
- 1986: Mac Davis – Somewhere in America (MCA) – vocals
