= Your Precious Love (album) =

Studio album by Ronnie McDowell
- Released: August 19, 1991
- Studio: SoundShop, Nashville, Tennessee
- Genre: Country
- Length: 27:46
- Label: Curb
- Producer: Buddy Killen

Ronnie McDowell chronology
American Music (1988)	Your Precious Love (1991)	When a Man Loves a Woman (1992)

Your Precious Love is Ronnie McDowell's 15th album, released on August 19, 1991. It is primarily a covers album of soul classics.

== Critical reception ==
Professional ratings
Review scores
Source	Rating
AllMusic	3/5 stars

AllMusic gives Your Precious Love 3 out of a possible 5 stars.

== Track listing ==
No.	Title	Writer(s)	Length
1.	"A Lover's Question"	Brook Benton; Jimmy T. Williams	2:44
2.	"Without Love"	Danny Small	3:03
3.	"Forever"	Buddy Killen	2:40
4.	"To Be Loved"	Roquel "Billy" Davis; Gwen Gordy Fuqua; Berry Gordy, Jr.	2:25
5.	"Don't Let Go"	Jesse Stone	2:40
6.	"Just Out of Reach"	Virgil F. Stewart	2:52
7.	"Let Them Talk"	Sonny Thompson	2:52
8.	"For Your Precious Love"	Jerry Butler; Arthur Brooks; Richard Brooks	3:08
9.	"Hold Me, Thrill Me, Kiss Me"	Harry Noble	2:48
10.	"I Believe"	Ervin Drake; Irvin Graham; Jimmy Shirl; Al Stillman	2:34
Total length:			27:46

Track information and credits adapted from the album's liner notes.

== Musicians ==
- Ronnie McDowell – vocals, background vocals
- David Briggs – keyboards
- Biff Watson – keyboards
- Lonnie Wilson – drums
- Bob Wray – bass
- Gary Lunn – bass
- John Willis – guitar
- Brent Rowan – guitar
- Kenneth Bell – guitar
- Don Potter – guitar
- David Baker – guitar
- Hurshel Wiginton – background vocals
- Doug Clements – background vocals
- Dennis Wilson – background vocals
- Louis Nunley – background vocals
- Wendy Johnson – background vocals
- Jennifer O'Brien – background vocals
- Lori Brooks – background vocals
- Bill Conn – horns (Track 5)

== Production ==
- Buddy Killen – producer
- Glenn Meadows – mastering
- Milan Bogdan – digital editing

== Charts ==
Chart (1991)	Peak position
US Top Country Albums (Billboard)	72
