= Watchin' Girls Go By =

Single by Ronnie McDowell

from the album Good Time Lovin' Man
- B-side: "Good Time Lovin' Man"
- Released: November 14, 1981
- Genre: Country
- Length: 2:40
- Label: Epic
- Songwriter(s): Ronnie McDowell, Buddy Killen
- Producer(s): Buddy Killen

Ronnie McDowell singles chronology
"Older Women" (1981)	"Watchin' Girls Go By" (1981)	"I Just Cut Myself" (1982)

"Watchin' Girls Go By" is a song co-written and recorded by American country music artist Ronnie McDowell. It was released in November 1981 as the second single from the album Good Time Lovin' Man. The song reached #4 on the Billboard Hot Country Singles & Tracks chart. McDowell wrote the song with Buddy Killen.

== Chart performance ==
Chart (1981–1982)	Peak position
US Hot Country Songs (Billboard)	4
Canadian RPM Country Tracks	3
