= I Dream of Women Like You =

Single by Ronnie McDowell

from the album Country Boy's Heart
- B-side: "Your Baby's Not My Baby"
- Released: February 25, 1984
- Genre: Country
- Length: 3:08
- Label: Epic
- Songwriter(s): Troy Seals
- Producer(s): Buddy Killen

Ronnie McDowell singles chronology
"You Made a Wanted Man of Me" (1983)	"I Dream of Women Like You" (1984)	"I Got a Million of 'Em" (1984)

"I Dream of Women Like You" is a song written by Troy Seals, and recorded by American country music artist Ronnie McDowell. It was released in February 1984 as the second single from the album Country Boy's Heart. The song reached #7 on the Billboard Hot Country Singles & Tracks chart.

== Chart performance ==
Chart (1984)	Peak position
US Hot Country Songs (Billboard)	7
Canadian RPM Country Tracks	6
