= Personally (Karla Bonoff song) =

1982 pop song

Single by Karla Bonoff

from the album Wild Heart of the Young
- B-side: "Dream"
- Released: April 1982
- Genre: Adult contemporary, soft rock
- Label: Columbia
- Songwriter: Paul Kelly
- Producer: Kenny Edwards

Karla Bonoff singles chronology
"Baby Don't Go" (1980)	"Personally" (1982)	"Please Be the One" (1982)

"Personally" is a song recorded by American singer-songwriter Karla Bonoff which was released as the lead single from her 1982 album Wild Heart of the Young. The song is Bonoff's only top 40 hit single.

== First recordings ==
"Personally" was first recorded in 1973 by its composer Paul Kelly, with Gene Page producing: however the track was not released although Kelly would record a new version of his composition for his 1993 album Gonna Stick and Stay.

== Karla Bonoff version ==
Bonoff learned of the song through Glenn Frey, who was the intended producer of her album Wild Heart of the Young before the job went to Kenny Edwards. Bonoff said Frey was "a great collector of obscure R&B tunes. He used to play me all these really cool [songs]." Frey mentioned to Bonoff that he had meant to send the Jackie Moore recording of "Personally" to Bonnie Raitt as a possible song to record herself, but Raitt hadn't received it. Bonoff recalled, "He was playing it for me and I said: 'Maybe I could [record it].'"

Highlighted by a solo by alto sax virtuoso Phil Kenzie, Bonoff's version of "Personally" spent 18 weeks on the Billboard Hot 100 with a number 19 peak: in Cash Box the track rose as high as #12 on the Top 100 Singles chart. Billboard ranked "Personally" as the 60th biggest hit of 1982.

== Chart performance ==
=== Weekly charts ===
Chart (1982)	Peak position
US Billboard Hot 100	19
US Adult Contemporary (Billboard)	3
US Cash Box Top 100	12
US Radio & Records CHR/Pop Airplay Chart	13

=== Year-end charts ===
Chart (1982)	Rank
US Billboard Hot 100	60
US Cash Box Top 100	76

== Other versions ==
"Personally"

Single by Ronnie McDowell

from the album Personally
- B-side: "You Make My Day Pay Off (All Night Long)"
- Released: January 29, 1983
- Genre: Country
- Length: 3:25
- Label: Epic
- Songwriter: Paul Kelly
- Producer: Buddy Killen

Ronnie McDowell singles chronology
"Step Back" (1982)	"Personally" (1983)	"You're Gonna Ruin My Bad Reputation" (1983)

- The song was covered in 1983 by American country music artist Ronnie McDowell. It was released in January 1983 as the first single and title track from his album Personally. The song reached #10 on the Billboard Hot Country Singles & Tracks chart.

=== Chart performance - Ronnie McDowell ===
Chart (1983)	Peak position
US Hot Country Songs (Billboard)	10
Canadian RPM Country Tracks	11

- The first evident released recording of the song was by Jackie Moore whose 1978 single release reached #92 Hot Soul Singles chart.
- "Personally" has also been recorded by Z. Z. Hill for his 1984 album Bluesmaster and by Helen Watson for her 1999 album Doffing.
