= Love Talks =

Single by Ronnie McDowell

from the album In a New York Minute
- B-side: "She Lays Me Down"
- Released: July 20, 1985
- Genre: Country
- Length: 3:09
- Label: Epic
- Songwriter(s): Tom Shapiro, Michael Garvin, Bucky Jones
- Producer(s): Buddy Killen

Ronnie McDowell singles chronology
"In a New York Minute" (1985)	"Love Talks" (1985)	"All Tied Up" (1986)

"Love Talks" is a song written by Tom Shapiro, Michael Garvin and Bucky Jones, and recorded by American country music artist Ronnie McDowell. It was released in July 1985 as the second single from the album In a New York Minute. The song reached #9 on the Billboard Hot Country Singles & Tracks chart.

== Chart performance ==
Chart (1985)	Peak position
US Hot Country Songs (Billboard)	9
Canadian RPM Country Tracks	14
