= You Made a Wanted Man of Me =

Single by Ronnie McDowell

from the album Country Boy's Heart
- B-side: "This Could Take Forever"
- Released: October 15, 1983
- Genre: Country
- Length: 3:00
- Label: Epic
- Songwriter(s): Jeff Crossan
- Producer(s): Buddy Killen

Ronnie McDowell singles chronology
"You're Gonna Ruin My Bad Reputation" (1983)	"You Made a Wanted Man of Me" (1983)	"I Dream of Women Like You" (1984)

"You Made a Wanted Man of Me" is a song written by Jeff Crossan, and recorded by American country music artist Ronnie McDowell. It was released in October 1983 as the first single from the album Country Boy's Heart. The song reached #3 on the Billboard Hot Country Singles & Tracks chart.

== Chart performance ==
Chart (1983–1984)	Peak position
US Hot Country Songs (Billboard)	3
Canadian RPM Country Tracks	4

–
