= You're Gonna Ruin My Bad Reputation =

Single by Ronnie McDowell

from the album Personally
- B-side: "I Should've Lied"
- Released: May 1983
- Genre: Country
- Length: 3:07
- Label: Epic
- Songwriter(s): Jeff Crossan
- Producer(s): Buddy Killen

Ronnie McDowell singles chronology
"Personally" (1983)	"You're Gonna Ruin My Bad Reputation" (1983)	"You Made a Wanted Man of Me" (1983)

"You're Gonna Ruin My Bad Reputation" is a song written by Jeff Crossan, and recorded by American country music artist Ronnie McDowell. It was released in May 1983 as the second single from the album Personally. The song was McDowell's second and final number one on the country chart. The single went to number one for a single week and spent twenty-two weeks on the country chart.

== Charts ==
=== Weekly charts ===
Chart (1983)	Peak position
US Hot Country Songs (Billboard)	1
Canadian RPM Country Tracks	1

=== Year-end charts ===
Chart (1983)	Position
US Hot Country Songs (Billboard)	2
