= In a New York Minute (song) =

Single by Ronnie McDowell

from the album In a New York Minute
- B-side: "Something Special"
- Released: January 1985
- Genre: Country
- Length: 2:39
- Label: Epic
- Songwriter(s): Tom Shapiro, Michael Garvin, Chris Waters
- Producer(s): Buddy Killen

Ronnie McDowell singles chronology
"I Got a Million of 'Em" (1984)	"In a New York Minute" (1985)	"Love Talks" (1985)

"In a New York Minute" is a song written by Tom Shapiro, Michael Garvin and Chris Waters, and recorded by American country music artist Ronnie McDowell. It was released in January 1985 as the first single and title track from his album In a New York Minute. The song reached #5 on the Billboard Hot Country Singles chart in May 1985 and #1 on the RPM Country Tracks chart in Canada.

== Chart performance ==
Chart (1985)	Peak position
US Hot Country Songs (Billboard)	5
Canadian RPM Country Tracks	1
