= Step Back (Ronnie McDowell song) =

Single by Ronnie McDowell

from the album Love to Burn
- B-side: "I Never Felt So Much Love (In One Bed)"
- Released: September 11, 1982
- Genre: Country
- Length: 2:54
- Label: Epic
- Songwriter(s): Craig Morris
- Producer(s): Buddy Killen

Ronnie McDowell singles chronology
"I Just Cut Myself" (1982)	"Step Back" (1982)	"Personally" (1983)

"Step Back" is a song recorded by American country music artist Ronnie McDowell. It was released in September 1982 as the second single from the album Love to Burn. The song reached #7 on the Billboard Hot Country Singles & Tracks chart. The song was written by Craig Morris.

== Chart performance ==
Chart (1982)	Peak position
US Hot Country Songs (Billboard)	7
