= Adult contemporary music =

Radio format

Adult contemporary
- Stylistic origins: Soft rock; easy listening; pop; soul; R&B; quiet storm
- Cultural origins: 1960s, United States

Subgenres
- Urban adult contemporary; Rhythmic adult contemporary; Christian adult contemporary

Other topics
- Power ballad

Adult contemporary (AC) is a category of popular music catered to adult demographics, including record charts and radio formats that are focused on such music.

The exact assemblage of adult contemporary music is influenced primarily by the popular music trends of a given era, and which trends and genres appeal more heavily to youth and young adults. It was originally established as a continuation of the easy listening and soft rock sounds from the 1960s and 1970s, acting as a counterbalance for the hard rock of the era, and later heavy metal and hip-hop: it initially focused on songs with varying degrees of influence from easy listening, pop, soul, R&B, quiet storm, and rock. In the 1990s, adult contemporary began to accommodate a hotter sound more inclusive of contemporary pop, and developed sub-categories devoted towards specific genres.

In radio broadcasting, adult contemporary formats typically target the demographic of adults 25–44, as they are favored among advertisers. They are differentiated primarily by their playlists, with "hot AC" stations usually focusing on uptempo mainstream music (including dance-pop, contemporary R&B, as well as pop, alternative, indie, and soft rock, while excluding more specialized types of hip-hop, hard rock, teen pop, and electronic dance music that do not appeal as strongly to older audiences), "mainstream AC" having a balance between current music and established hits from past decades, and "soft AC" having a more conservative sound. AC stations may also feature pop hits from previous decades that are considered nostalgic by the target audience.

Other sub-categories of AC have also emerged, including rhythmic adult contemporary (which focuses particularly on dance music), urban adult contemporary (which focuses on R&B and soul music), and Christian adult contemporary.

== History ==
=== 1960s: Early roots; easy listening and soft rock ===
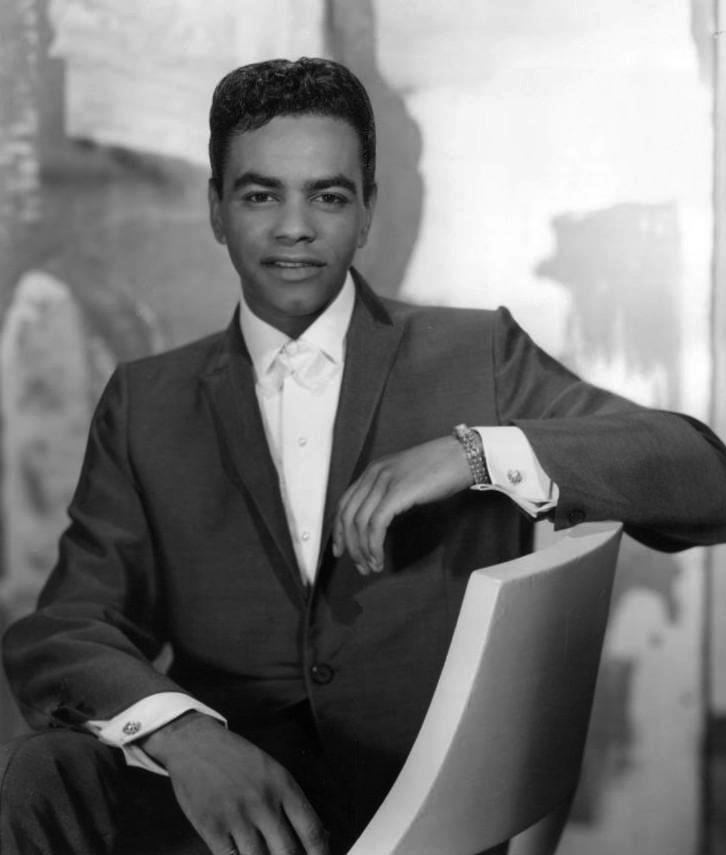
Johnny Mathis concentrated on romantic readings of jazz and pop standards for the adult contemporary audience of the 1960s and 1970s.

Adult contemporary traces its roots to the 1960s easy listening format, which adopted a 70–80% instrumental to 20–30% vocal mix. A few offered 90% instrumentals, and a handful were entirely instrumental. The easy listening format, as it was first known, was born of a desire by some radio stations in the late 1950s and early 1960s to continue playing current hit songs, but distinguish themselves from being branded as "rock and roll" stations. Billboard first published the Easy Listening chart July 17, 1961, with 20 songs; the first number one was "Boll Weevil Song" by Brook Benton. The chart described itself as "not too far out in either direction".

Initially, the vocalists consisted of artists such as Frank Sinatra, Doris Day, Johnny Mathis, Connie Francis, Nat King Cole, Perry Como, and others. The custom recordings were usually instrumental versions of current or recent rock and roll or pop hit songs, a move intended to give the stations more mass appeal without selling out. Some stations would also occasionally play earlier big band-era recordings from the 1940s and early 1950s.

After 1965, differences between the Hot 100 chart and the Easy Listening chart became more pronounced. Better reflecting what middle of the road stations were actually playing, the composition of the chart changed dramatically. As rock music continued to harden, there was much less crossover between the Hot 100 and Easy Listening chart than there had been in the early half of the 1960s. Roger Miller, Barbra Streisand and Bobby Vinton were among the chart's most popular performers.

One big impetus for the development of the AC radio format was that, when rock and roll music first became popular in the mid-1950s, many more conservative radio stations wanted to continue to play current hit songs while shying away from rock. These middle of the road (or "MOR") stations also frequently included older, pre-rock-era adult standards and big band titles to further appeal to adult listeners who had grown up with those songs.

Another big impetus for the evolution of the AC radio format was the popularity of easy listening or "beautiful music" stations, stations with music specifically designed to be purely ambient. Whereas most easy listening music was instrumental, created by relatively unknown artists, and rarely purchased (especially as singles, although Jackie Gleason's beautiful music albums sold well in the 1950s), AC was an attempt to create a similar "lite" format by choosing certain tracks (both hit singles and album cuts) of popular artists.

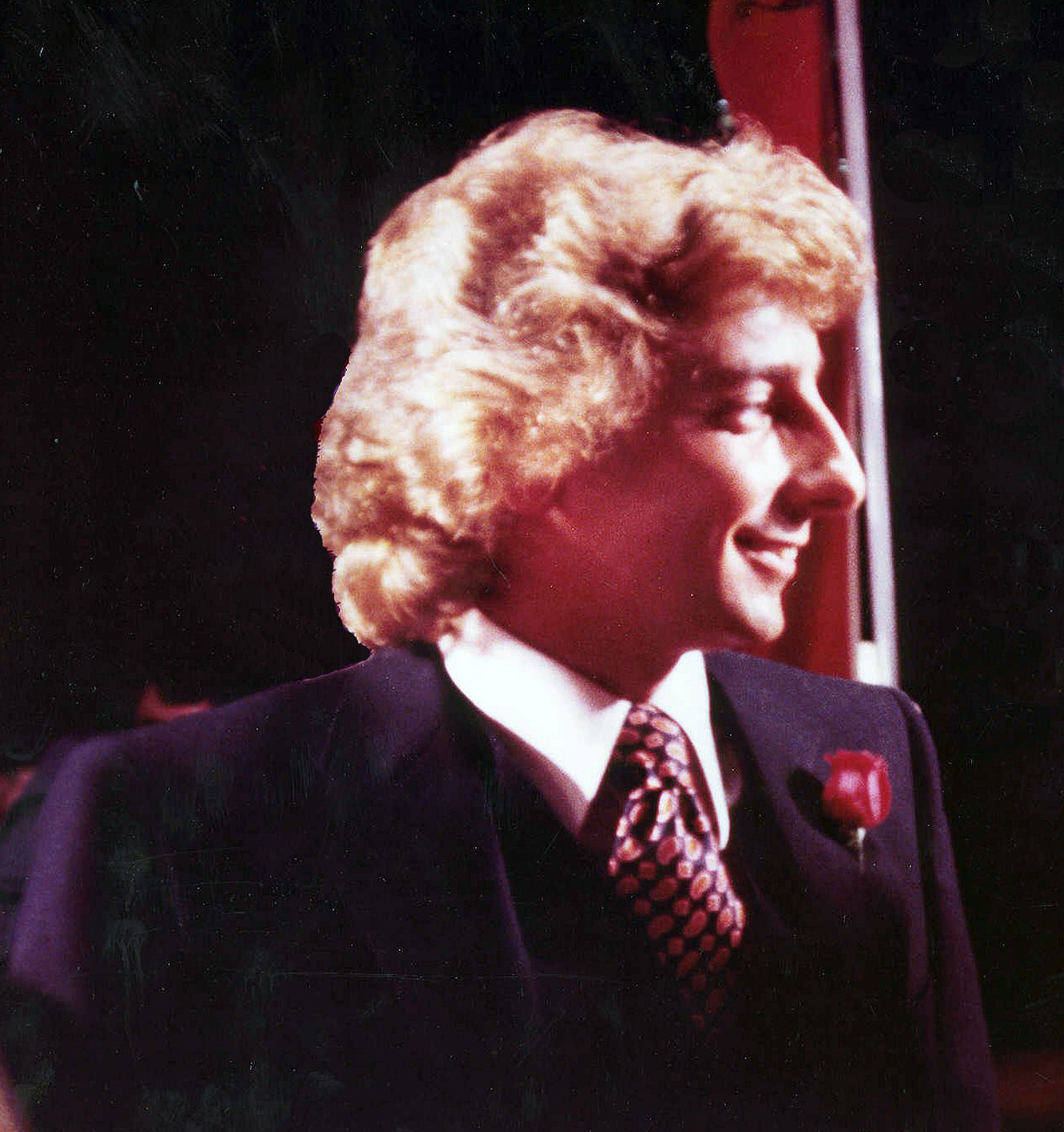
In terms of record sales and career longevity, Barry Manilow is one of the most successful adult contemporary singers ever and the most best-selling of the 1970s.

=== 1970s: Soft rock forms as a radio format ===
By the late 1960s, hard rock had been established as one of the rock genres leading hard rock and soft rock to became distinct popular forms in the rock scene, and as major radio formats in the US. Soft rock was often derived from folk rock, using acoustic instruments and putting more emphasis on melody and harmonies. Major artists included Carole King, Cat Stevens, James Taylor and Bread.

In the early 1970s, softer songs by the Carpenters, Anne Murray, John Denver, Barry Manilow, and even Barbra Streisand, began to be played more often on "Top 40" radio. Top 40 radio stations played the Top 40 hits regardless of genre. As the texture of much of the music played on Top 40 radio began to soften, the Hot 100 and Easy Listening/AC charts became more similar. Easy Listening radio began playing songs by artists who had begun in other genres, such as rock and roll or R&B. Much of the music recorded by singer-songwriters such as Diana Ross, James Taylor, Carly Simon, Carole King and Janis Ian got as much, if not more, airplay on AC stations than on Top 40 stations. AC stations also began playing softer songs by Elvis Presley, Linda Ronstadt, Elton John, Rod Stewart, Billy Joel, and other rock-based artists. Soon after, the adult contemporary format began evolving into the sound that later defined it, with rock-oriented acts as Chicago and the Eagles, becoming associated with the format. In addition, several early disco songs also did well on the Adult Contemporary format.

Soft rock reached its commercial peak in the mid-to-late 1970s with acts such as Toto, England Dan & John Ford Coley, Air Supply, Seals and Crofts, Dan Fogelberg, America and the reformed Fleetwood Mac, whose Rumours (1977) was one of the best-selling albums of the decade. By 1977, some radio stations, notably New York's WTFM and NBC-owned WYNY, and Boston's WEEI, had switched to an all-soft rock format. As Softrock 103, WEEI was famous for its promotional campaigns, featuring slogans such as "Joni, without the baloni." and "The Byrds, without the nyrds." However, different forms of popular music targeted for different demographic groups, such as disco and hard rock, began to emerge in the late 1970s. This led to specialized radio stations that played specific genres of music; further, radio stations generally followed the evolution of artists in those genres.

=== 1980s: Adult contemporary succeeds as radio format ===
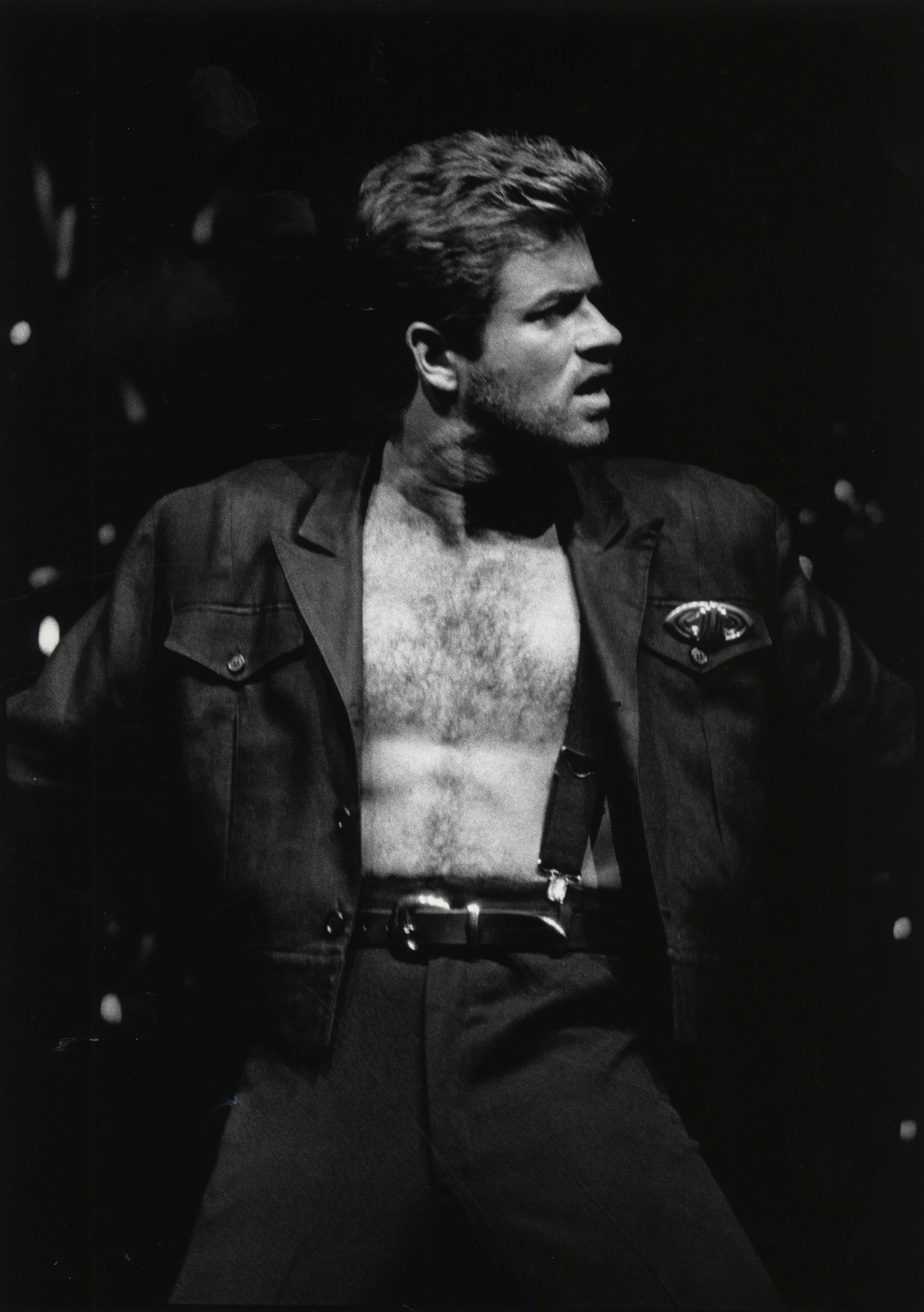
"Careless Whisper" stayed at the No. 1 spot in the adult contemporary chart for 5 weeks. The song was George Michael's first solo single.

On April 7, 1979, the Easy Listening chart officially became known as Adult Contemporary, and those two words have remained consistent in the name of the chart ever since. Adult contemporary music became one of the most popular radio formats of the 1980s. The growth of AC was a natural result of the generation that first listened to the more "specialized" music of the mid-late 1970s growing older and not being interested in the heavy metal and rap/hip-hop music that a new generation helped to play a significant role in the Top 40 charts by the end of the decade.

Mainstream AC itself has evolved in a similar fashion over the years; traditional AC artists such as Barbra Streisand, the Carpenters, Dionne Warwick, Barry Manilow, John Denver, and Olivia Newton-John found it harder to have major Top 40 hits as the 1980s wore on, and due to the influence of MTV, artists who were staples of the Contemporary Hit Radio format, such as Richard Marx, Michael Jackson, Bonnie Tyler, George Michael, Phil Collins, Laura Branigan and Journey began crossing over to the AC charts with greater frequency. Collins has been described by AllMusic as "one of the most successful pop and adult contemporary singers of the '80s and beyond". However, with the combination of MTV and AC radio, adult contemporary appeared harder to define as a genre, with established soft-rock artists of the past still charting pop hits and receiving airplay alongside mainstream radio fare from newer artists at the time.

Chicago band logo. Their 1984 single "You're the Inspiration" from their fourteenth studio album Chicago 17 (1984) became synonymous with the soft rock radio format.

The amount of crossover between the AC chart and the Hot 100 has varied based on how much the passing pop music trends of the times appealed to adult listeners. Not many disco or new wave songs were particularly successful on the AC chart during the late 1970s and early 1980s, and much of the hip-hop and harder rock music featured on CHR formats later in the decade would have been unacceptable on AC radio.

Although dance-oriented, electronic pop and ballad-oriented rock dominated the 1980s, soft rock songs still enjoyed a mild success thanks to Sheena Easton, Amy Grant, Lionel Richie, Christopher Cross, Dan Hill, Leo Sayer, Billy Ocean, Julio Iglesias, Bertie Higgins, and Tommy Page. No song spent more than six weeks at No. 1 on this chart during the 1980s, with nine songs accomplishing that feat. Two of these were by Lionel Richie, "You Are" in 1983 and "Hello" in 1984, which also reached No. 1 on the Hot 100.

In 1989, Linda Ronstadt released Cry Like a Rainstorm, Howl Like the Wind, described by critics as "the first true Adult Contemporary album of the decade", featuring American soul singer Aaron Neville on several of the twelve tracks. The album was certified Triple Platinum in the United States alone and became a major success throughout the globe. The Grammy Award-winning singles, "Don't Know Much" and "All My Life", were both long-running No. 1 Adult Contemporary hits. Several additional singles from the disc made the AC Top 10 as well. The album won over many critics in the need to define AC, and appeared to change the tolerance and acceptance of AC music into mainstream day to day radio play.

=== 1990s: Subgenre formations/radio crossovers ===
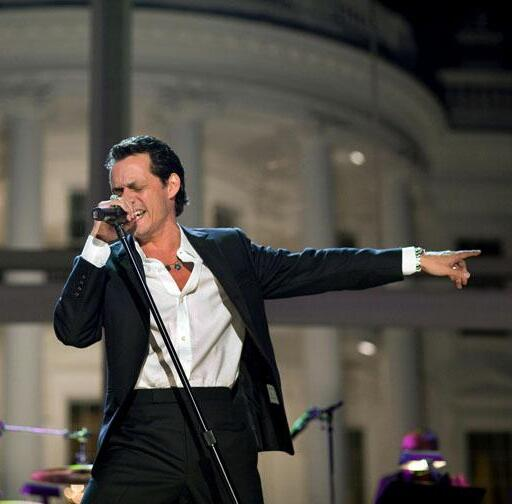
Latin artist Marc Anthony's self-titled English-language album released in 1999 had singles that crossed over to the AC charts.

The early 1990s marked the softening of urban R&B in the shape of new jack swing, at the same time alternative rock emerged and traditional pop saw a significant resurgence. This in part led to a widening of the market, not only allowing to cater to more niche markets, but it also became customary for artists to make AC-friendly singles. At the same time, the genre began adopting elements from hard rock as tastes were shifting towards louder music, while AC stations in general began playing more rock acts. "Softer" features such as light instrumental music (carried over from the beautiful music format—many AC stations carried the format until the early 1970s), new age songs and most pre-1964 artists were gradually phased out from AC radio throughout the early to mid-1990s.

Unlike the majority of 1980s mainstream singers, the 1990s mainstream pop/R&B singers such as All-4-One, Boyz II Men, Christina Aguilera, Backstreet Boys and Savage Garden generally crossed over to the AC charts. Latin pop artists such as Lynda Thomas, Ricky Martin, Marc Anthony, Selena, Enrique Iglesias and Luis Miguel also enjoyed success in the AC charts.

In addition to Celine Dion, who has had significant success on this chart, other artists with multiple number ones on the AC chart in the 1990s include Mariah Carey, Phil Collins, Michael Bolton, Bryan Adams, Whitney Houston and Shania Twain. Newer female Adult album alternative singer-songwriters such as Sarah McLachlan, Natalie Merchant, Jewel, Melissa Etheridge and Sheryl Crow also broke through on the AC chart during this time.

In 1996, Billboard created a new chart called Adult Top 40, which reflects programming on radio stations that exists somewhere between "adult contemporary" music and "pop" music. Although they are sometimes mistaken for each other, the Adult Contemporary chart and the Adult Top 40 chart are separate charts, and songs reaching one chart might not reach the other. In addition, hot AC is another subgenre of radio programming that is distinct from the Hot Adult Contemporary Tracks chart as it exists today, despite the apparent similarity in name.

In response to the pressure on Hot AC, a new kind of AC format cropped up among American radio recently. The urban adult contemporary format (a term coined by Barry Mayo) usually attracts a large number of African Americans and sometimes Caucasian listeners through playing a great deal of R&B (without any form of rapping), gospel music, classic soul and dance music (including disco).

Another format, rhythmic AC, in addition to playing all the popular hot and soft AC music, past and present, places a heavy emphasis on disco as well as 1980s and 1990s dance hits, such as those by Amber, and Black Box, and includes dance remixes of pop songs, such as the Soul Solution mix of Toni Braxton's "Unbreak My Heart".

In its early years of existence, the smooth jazz format was considered to be a form of AC, although it was mainly instrumental, and related a stronger resemblance to the soft AC-styled music. For many years, George Benson, Kenny G and Dave Koz had all had crossover hits that were played on both smooth jazz and soft AC stations.

=== 2000s – present: AC music goes mainstream and mainstream music goes AC ===
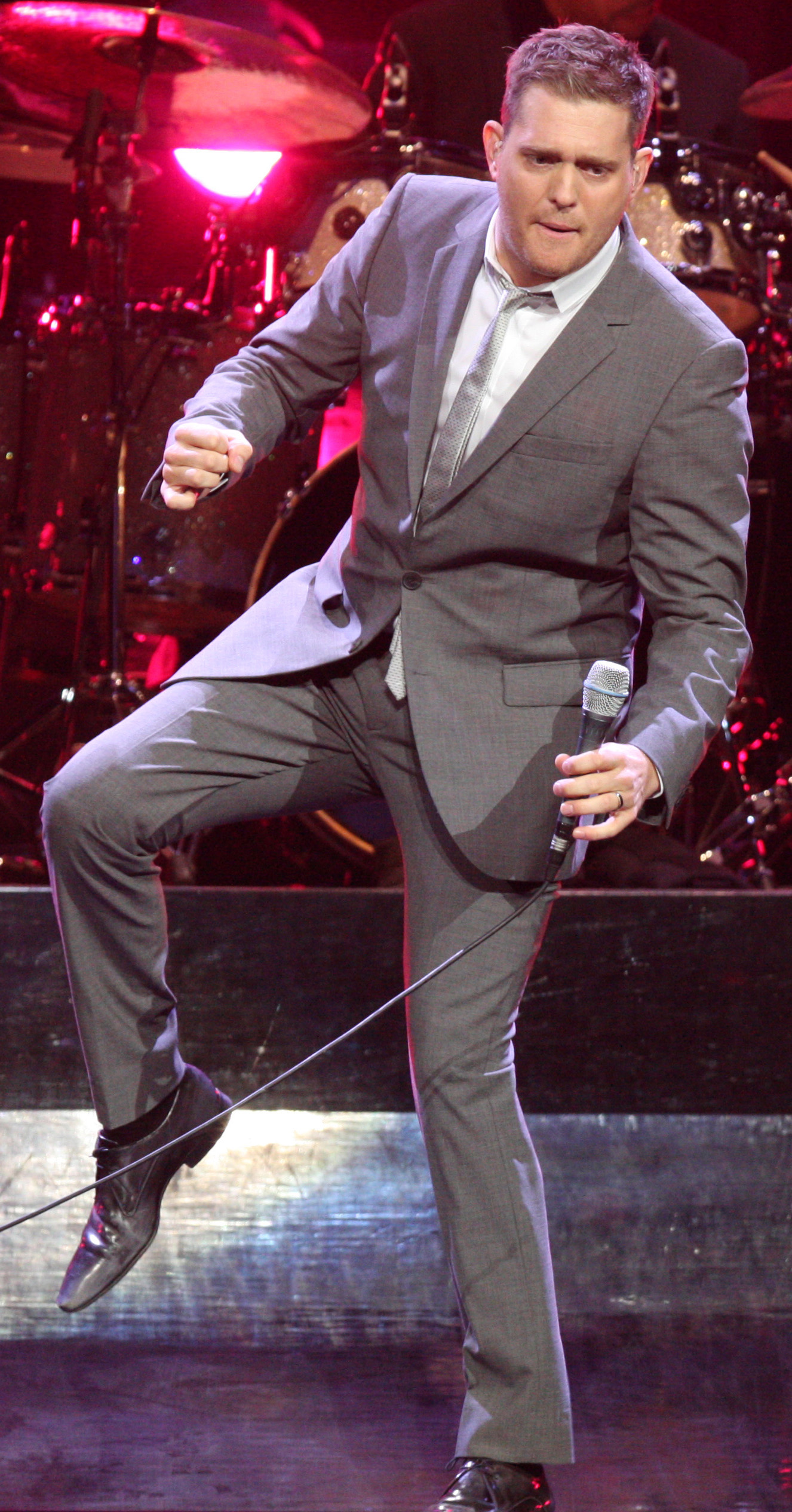
A number of Michael Bublé's singles and albums topped the AC charts in the 2000s and 2010s.

During the 2000s, the AC market gained an increased presence in the music industry, as its radio formats were popular nationwide—Smooth jazz and "Urban AC" stations were ubiquitous in the East Coast, while Soft rock and "adult standards" stations were common in the Midwest, and pop-oriented "Hot AC" and "world music"/Hispanic AC stations were easily found in the West Coast and the "Sun Belt". This led to the presence of numerous genres on the AC charts, often crossing to the "pop" charts, winning over many critics in the need to define AC, and increased the tolerance and acceptance of AC music into mainstream day-to-day radio play.

Josh Groban's single "You Raise Me Up" and Michael Bublé's cover of "Fever" are often cited as key examples of the high production values and ballad-heavy sound that defined 2000s-era AC, often dubbed as "jazz-pop", heavily carrying classical, jazz and traditional pop influences. Artists such as Nick Lachey, James Blunt, Jamie Cullum, John Mayer, Jason Mraz, Norah Jones, Diana Krall, Amy Winehouse and Susan Boyle also achieved great success during this period. During most of the 2000s, country music/countrypolitan musicians such as Kelly Clarkson, Clay Aiken, Garth Brooks, Shania Twain, LeAnn Rimes and Carrie Underwood scored hits on soft AC, particularly in Southern states. A popular trend in the late 1990s and 2000s was remixing dance music hits into adult contemporary ballads, especially in the US, (for example, the "Candlelight Mix" versions of "Heaven" by DJ Sammy and Yanou, "Listen To Your Heart" by D.H.T., and "Everytime We Touch" by Cascada).

Key to the success of AC in the 2000s was the 25–34 demographic, which had outgrown the pop music offerings of the time, most new rock became too alternative and harsh for AC radio and most new pop was now influenced heavily by dance-pop, hip-hop and electronic dance music. At the same time, the music industry also began to focus on older audiences and markets generally considered "niche".

During the late 2000s, certain pop songs began entering the AC charts instead, generally after having recently fallen off the Hot 100. Adrian Moreira, senior vice president for adult music for RCA Music Group, said, "We've seen a fairly tidal shift in what AC will play". Rather than emphasizing older songs, adult contemporary now began playing many of the same songs as top 40 and adult top 40, but only after the hits had become established. An article on MTV's website by Corey Moss describes this trend as: "In other words, AC stations are where pop songs go to die a very long death. Or, to optimists, to get a second life." As adult contemporary has long characterized itself as family-friendly, "clean" versions of pop songs began appearing on the AC chart, as were the cases of "Perfect" by P!nk, and "Forget You" by Cee Lo Green, both in 2011.

AC radio's shift into more mainstream pop was a result of the changes on the broadcasting landscape following the Great Recession, as advertisers preferred more profitable chart-based formats, which meant the demise of many AC-based formulas, primarily those aimed at older audiences, with tastes changing towards more modern music among all age groups. Diminishing physical record sales throughout the 2010s also proved a major blow to the AC genre, and there are concerns that the portable people meter, a device being used to determine radio listenership, may be incompatible with AC songs and may not accurately pick up that a person is listening to an AC station because of the pitches and frequencies used in the style.

Key AC artists of the early to mid-2010s included Bruno Mars, Coldplay, Adele, Arcade Fire, Meghan Trainor, Maroon 5 and Ed Sheeran, featuring a more pop-influenced, uptempo style than the typical AC fare of previous years, also featuring production values reminiscent of the Motown sound and the so-called Wall of Sound that dominated the soul-heavy pop charts of the early 1960s, when the Easy Listening chart was first introduced. The earlier years of the decade also saw alternative and indie rock acts such as Wilco, Feist, The 1975, Imagine Dragons, Mumford & Sons, Of Monsters and Men and The Lumineers quickly becoming AC mainstays, although these were eventually replaced by rhythm-based rock bands such as Panic! at the Disco, Neon Trees, X Ambassadors, Sheppard, Bastille, American Authors, Fitz and the Tantrums, Foster the People, Twenty One Pilots, Walk the Moon and Milky Chance.

During the middle of the decade, newer artists such as CeeLo Green, OneRepublic, Rachel Platten, Christina Perri, Andy Grammer, James Bay, Sara Bareilles, Shawn Mendes, Sia, Sam Smith, Gavin Degraw, Charlie Puth and Colbie Caillat as well as acts that were popular in the 1990s and early 2000s such as Britney Spears and Christina Aguilera were added to the rotation of most AC stations.

As trap music and similar styles of hip-hop began dominating top 40 stations during the last years of the 2010s, AC stations began picking up rhythmic artists like Rihanna, Lady Gaga, Ellie Goulding, Taio Cruz and Pitbull as well as EDM artists like Avicii, Daft Punk, Calvin Harris, David Guetta and Tiesto. Meanwhile, younger artists like Camila Cabello, Justin Bieber, Selena Gomez, Ariana Grande, Nick Jonas and the Jonas Brothers and Halsey began to be featured on AC stations more than on top 40 stations.

== Adult contemporary formats ==
In radio broadcasting, adult contemporary is divided into several sub-formats, each with their own musical direction and demographic targeting. Hot adult contemporary formats generally feature an uptempo rotation of recent hits that appeal to a wide adult audience. A station formatted as "adult contemporary" with no qualifier, also referred to as "mainstream" AC, generally has a similar playlist to hot AC stations, but with a broader rotation of classic hits from past decades.

Soft adult contemporary formats have a more conservative sound oriented primarily towards adult women, urban AC focuses on R&B and soul music that appeal to African American adults, and rhythmic AC focuses on dance music and other rhythmic genres.

=== Hot adult contemporary ===
Hot adult contemporary (hot AC) radio stations play a wide range of popular music that appeals to the 18–54 age group; it serves as a middle ground between the youth-oriented contemporary hit radio (CHR) format, and other adult contemporary formats (such as "mainstream" and soft AC) that are typically targeted towards a more mature demographic. They generally feature uptempo hit music from the last 25 years with wide appeal, such as pop and pop rock songs, while excluding more youth-oriented music such as hip-hop. Older music featured on hot AC stations usually reflects familiar and youthful music that adults had grown up with. Likewise, material from legacy pop acts such as the Backstreet Boys, Jason Mraz, John Mayer, and Pink is prominent within the format.

The "hot AC" designation began to appear in the 1990s; the term described adult contemporary stations with a more energetic presentation and uptempo sound than their softer counterparts. An early example of the format, Houston's KHMX Mix 96.5, climbed from 14th place in the market to third in the six months after its launch. The station's format and branding was widely replicated by other stations. Many hot AC outlets are among the top stations in their respective market.

Initially focused more on pop rock, the format has evolved to reflect changes in the composition of this audience; by the mid-2000s, the format had evolved to include more uptempo pop music, while alternative and indie rock crossovers (such as Foster the People, Imagine Dragons, Lovelytheband, and Twenty One Pilots) became more prevalent within the format during the 2010s.

These developments helped to expand the popularity of the format among younger listeners such as millennials; Nielsen Audio ranked hot AC as the third most-popular format among millennials, behind pop and country music. Of the format's expanding demographic reach, WOMX-FM program director Dana Taylor stated that hot AC stations "may not be the radio station that everybody agrees on, but it's a radio station that everybody goes, 'I'm okay with that'." The increasingly downtempo direction of pop hits in the mid-to-late 2010's also helped to attract additional listeners.

Hot AC stations typically keep a larger body of recent hits in rotation than those with rigid, chart-driven formats like CHR and urban contemporary. As these stations' playlists have become concentrated towards airing only the current hits at a given time, hot AC airplay can build and sustain a song's popularity over a long-term period. This effect has been credited in helping build an audience for early singles from new acts such as Adele, Rachel Platten ("Fight Song", which gained prominence for its use during Hillary Clinton's 2016 US presidential election campaign), and Max Schneider (whose 2016 single "Lights Down Low", over a year after its original release, became a sleeper hit on the Billboard Mainstream Top 40 and Hot 100 due in part to strong hot AC airplay).

The popularity of the hot AC format prompted many mainstream AC stations to add uptempo music to their playlists, while still maintaining a deeper rotation of older hits than hot AC stations.

==== Modern adult contemporary ====
Modern adult contemporary refers to AC formats with a stronger lean towards modern rock and pop rock.

In the 1990s and early 2000s, modern AC was typically targeted towards women, with Mike Marino of KMXB in Las Vegas describing the format as reaching "an audience that has outgrown the edgier hip-hop or alternative music but hasn't gotten old and sappy enough for the soft ACs." The format typically focused on female rock acts such as Shawn Colvin, Sheryl Crow, Indigo Girls, Jewel, and Sarah McLachlan, and folk rock-influenced bands such as Counting Crows and The Wallflowers. Today, the format is fairly uncommon, with KTCZ in the Minnesota Twin Cities and KMXP in Phoenix, Arizona being some of the few modern AC stations left.

=== Soft adult contemporary ===
The Soft adult contemporary format typically targets women 25–54 and at-work listening. Soft AC playlists are generally conservative in comparison to hot AC, focusing on pop and power ballads, soft rock, and other familiar, light hits. Upon its establishment in the 1980s, the soft AC format was positioned as being a more upbeat version of easy listening that would appeal better to a younger audience, mainly by excluding instrumental beautiful music. Easy listening stations had begun shifting to the format out of concern that their existing programming would not appeal to the current generation of listeners.

In a 1990 article, James Warren of the Chicago Tribune characterized soft AC stations as being "as middle-of-the-road and unthreatening as modern media get", with personalities that were encouraged to be as inoffensive and "low-profile" as possible, and a more conservative music library than hot AC-leaning stations. In particular, Chicago's WLIT did not have its airstaff talk over the beginning and endings of songs (in contrast to the hot AC-leaning WFYR), and played Bob Seger's "We've Got Tonite" but not "Old Time Rock and Roll" (which was part of WTMX's playlist). The director of a soft AC station in Connecticut, WEZN-FM, told Warren that he had barred the reading of top-of-hour news headlines, so that listeners wouldn't be tempted to tune away to an all-news station to learn more.

Soft AC stations tend to be more selective in their music libraries than other adult contemporary stations, preferring proven songs over current hits. Upon the onset of the format's popularity, core artists typically included singers such as Nat King Cole, Perry Como, Neil Diamond, Barry Manilow, Johnny Mathis, and Barbra Streisand. By the 1990s, to improve their appeal among changing demographics, some soft AC stations began to widen their playlist to include selections from contemporary acts with 80s, & 90s, musicians & bands such as Bon Jovi, Bryan Adams, Celine Dion, Roxette, Mariah Carey, Eric Clapton, Phil Collins, Elton John, Cher, Whitney Houston, Journey, and Queen. On the other hand, by 1996, New York's WLTW had begun to phase out its softer music in favor of a more uptempo direction.

In 2017, Inside Radio reported that soft AC had the third-largest decrease in US stations offering the format over the past decade (at 128), ranking behind only adult standards and oldies—a shift credited to aging demographics and a major boom in the wider-appealing classic hits format (which saw the largest overall increase over the same period). Consultant Gary Berkowitz argued that the soft AC format had become increasingly irrelevant in comparison to mainstream and hot AC, due to PPM markets preferring uptempo music.

At the same time, however, soft AC began to experience a resurgence. In April 2016, iHeartMedia flipped its San Francisco classic soul station KISQ to soft AC as The Breeze; as of November 2018, it was the top station in the Bay Area. The trend continued into 2017 and 2018, with iHeartMedia extending its Breeze brand to other soft AC flips, and the brand (among others) being adopted by competitors such as Entercom. Industry analyst Sean Ross argued that older demographics were becoming more lucrative due to changes in listening habits among younger audiences, which prefer digital platforms such as music streaming services over linear terrestrial radio, and also noted how mainstream AC was dependent on the Top 40 charts to break new songs.

Current soft AC stations have continued to feature recurrents such as Michael Bolton, Celine Dion, Elton John, Fleetwood Mac, Hall & Oates, and Whitney Houston, while contemporary musicians such as Adele and Michael Bublé have also become modern fixtures of the format. In addition, the soft AC sound has diversified to include more songs that are "safe and universal" but not necessarily "soft", with Ross presenting examples such as Simple Minds' "Don't You (Forget About Me)", the retroactively defined genre of yacht rock, and noting that KSWD in Seattle—one of the stations that had launched in the soft AC "boom" of the late-2010s—had featured dance- and synth-pop songs such as "Poker Face", "Sweet Dreams (Are Made of This)", and "Uptown Funk" in its final days as a soft AC station before flipping to hot AC.

Over time, some stations have gradually adjusted their playlists to include more recurrents from the 1980s and 1970s (although not to the same extent as "soft oldies" formats, such as MeTV FM, which have also grown in popularity). Meanwhile, some classic hits and mainstream AC stations have increasingly aired songs that had historically been considered staples of soft AC.

=== Urban adult contemporary ===
The Urban adult contemporary format focuses primarily on current and classic R&B and soul music. The format typically targets African-American adults: July 2018 numbers from Nielsen Audio recorded it as the top format among African-Americans 25–54 and 35–64. It also has a sizable popularity among younger listeners, ranking behind urban contemporary as the second-most popular format among African-American adults 18–34 in the same report, with an 18.9 audience share.

The format typically excludes youthful rhythmic music, such as commercial hip-hop and rap, that are usually associated with the urban contemporary format. The urban AC format is also associated with the "quiet storm"—mellower R&B ballads and slow jams, often in a jazz-influenced style. The syndicated evening program Keith Sweat Hotel focuses specifically on such music.

As urban contemporary stations prefer hit-driven hip-hop songs, labels typically service R&B songs to the urban AC format only. Some current R&B musicians have complained that this is an artificial divide that prevents them from reaching a wider, mainstream audience (citing the relatively smaller number of urban AC outlets in comparison to urban and rhythmic), even with attempts to give some singles a hip-hop-influenced sound to improve the potential for crossover appeal. Some acts have attempted to disassociate themselves from "R&B" to reduce the effect of this stigma, although music streaming services have helped to expose R&B to a wider audience beyond urban AC radio.

=== Rhythmic adult contemporary ===
The Rhythmic adult contemporary format generally focuses on a variety of current and classic dance music, such as dance-pop, hip-hop, and R&B (often resembling a blend of the rhythmic oldies and hot AC formats in practice). The exact composition of current and recurrent content can vary between stations, depending on local cultures and the heritage of rhythmic formats in the market, ranging from late-80s/early-90s dance hits (including latin freestyle), to disco and Motown. Rhythmic hot AC has also been used as a format, popularized by stations such as New York's WKTU.

=== Smooth adult contemporary ===
The Smooth adult contemporary format is a variant of the smooth jazz format that incorporates mainstream and/or urban adult contemporary songs; they are designed to appeal to a wider range of demographics than a straight smooth jazz format. Some smooth AC stations may limit their airplay of jazz instrumentals to those by better-known performers such as Kenny G.

=== Christian adult contemporary ===
Contemporary Christian music (CCM) has several subgenres, one being "Christian AC". Radio & Records, for instance, lists Christian AC among its format charts. There has been crossover to mainstream and hot AC formats by many of the core artists of the Christian AC genre, notably Amy Grant, Michael W. Smith, Kathy Troccoli, Steven Curtis Chapman, Plumb, and more recently Big Daddy Weave, Casting Crowns, For King & Country, Lauren Daigle, MercyMe, and Newsboys.

=== Spanish adult contemporary ===
A number of Spanish-language stations in the U.S. run versions of the adult contemporary format oriented towards Latin pop, such as TelevisaUnivision's KLVE Los Angeles (one of the highest-rated Spanish-language radio stations in the country); upon its launch in 2014, Spanish AC station KVIB identified core artists such as Alejandro Fernández, Ana Gabriel, Romeo Santos, and Joan Sebastian.

In 2023, iHeartMedia began to roll out a variation of the Spanish AC format on some of its stations, featuring a gold-based mix of Latin pop and English-language, mainstream AC hits from the 1980s and 1990s (with core artists such as the Backstreet Boys, Celine Dion, Luis Miguel, Madonna, Marc Anthony, Michael Jackson, Selena, and Whitney Houston, as well as Latin pop crossovers such as Gloria Estefan and Shakira), and programming presented in Spanish. The format is intended to appeal to bilingual audiences. First introduced by WMIA-FM in Miami, the hybrid format quickly proved successful, prompting iHeartMedia to replicate it at KXXM San Antonio, and similar formats appearing at stations such as WOEX in Orlando, KOIT-DT3/KUFX-DT2 in the San Francisco Bay Area, KGSR-HD4 in Austin, and WEPN-FM in New York City.

=== Adult album alternative ===
The Adult album alternative (triple-A or AAA) format generally features a diverse playlist of music that appeals to an adult audience, with a focus on emerging songs and artists, and often featuring songs that were not released as singles. The exact composition of a triple-A station's playlist can vary, with alternative rock, indie rock, and indie pop commonly used as core genres, and some stations featuring more uncommon genres such as alternative country, Americana, blues, folk music, and world music. NPR observed in 2018 that roughly half of all triple-A stations in the U.S. were non-commercial stations. With the wide variety of music that is serviced to the format, adult album alternative charts have often served as a feeder for other adult contemporary formats, especially hot AC, and have been credited for breaking acts such as Dave Matthews Band and Lorde.

== Christmas music ==
Since the 1990s, it has become common for many AC stations, particularly soft AC stations, to play primarily or exclusively Christmas music during the Christmas season in November and December. While these tend mostly to be contemporary seasonal recordings by the same artists featured under the normal format, most stations will also air at least some vintage holiday tunes from older pop, MOR, and adult standards artists – such as Boney M., The Carpenters, Nat King Cole, Perry Como, Bing Crosby, Percy Faith, Mannheim Steamroller, Dean Martin, Johnny Mathis, Trans-Siberian Orchestra, and Andy Williams – many of whom would never be played on these stations during the rest of the year.

These Christmas music marathons typically start a few weeks before or the day after Thanksgiving Day and end after Christmas Day, or sometimes extending to New Year's Day. Afterwards, the stations usually resume their normal music fare. Several stations begin the holiday format much earlier, at the beginning of November especially after Halloween. The roots of this tradition can be traced back to the beautiful music and easy listening stations of the 1960s and 1970s.

== Syndicated radio shows and networks carrying the adult contemporary format ==
- Delilah – One of the US's most popular radio shows, Delilah airs primarily in the evening. Its Christmas Edition airs from mid-November to late December.
- Intelligence for Your Life – Hosted by John Tesh, this show also airs evenings and also on weekends.
- American Top 40 with Ryan Seacrest – One version of AT40 airs on US hot AC stations, which is a little different from its Top-40/CHR counterpart.
- Rick Dees Weekly Top 40/Weekly Top 30 – Began offering Hot AC versions of the popular countdown show in June 1996. These shows feature the top 20 Hot AC songs in the US along with about 10 past hits from the 1980s, 1990s and early 2000s (decade). A softer "AC" version was added in July 2009 to try to fill in the void left by Casey Kasem ending his AC countdown.
- Radio Disney Music Top 30 Countdown, One version is for Hot AC stations, the other version is for Mainstream AC stations. Plays the USA Top 30 songs of the week according to Mediabase and a music rating service called ratethemusic.com. This show, like Rick Dees' show, is distributed by Compass Media Networks.
- Backtrax USA with Kid Kelly – Weekend programs focusing on the '80s and '90s, targeted for hot AC stations.
- ABC and Dial Global both offer AC 24-hour networks programming soft and hot AC.
- Tom Joyner and Steve Harvey have popular morning shows that air on urban AC (and sometimes Hip-Hop) stations. Both shows are often heard on competing stations in the same city, such as St. Louis, Philadelphia and Atlanta. Joyner's show is syndicated by ABC Radio, and Harvey's show by Premiere Radio Networks.
- Retro Rewind with Dave Harris is a weekend-based radio show highlighting a massive playlist of songs from the 1980s and 1990s, interviews, spotlights and contests. The show is done live across the US on Saturday nights, taking audience requests. The show is targeted towards HOT AC and AC radio stations.
- The EZ Rock network is a brand/network of soft AC heard in Canada.
- Heart - A radio network in the UK that grew throughout 2009 as more stations were rebranded as "Heart".
- Smooth Radio – A UK-wide radio network that formed from six regional Smooth Radio stations.
- Smoothfm – A network of two Australian commercial radio stations (based in Sydney and Melbourne) that are focused on providing an eclectic easy-listening playlist, usually featuring ballads.
- Nova – A network of five Australian commercial radio station (based in Sydney, Melbourne, Brisbane, Adelaide and Perth) that are very similar to Smoothfm.
- The Breeze – A group of New Zealand adult contemporary radio stations owned by MediaWorks Radio. There are 20 stations currently broadcasting throughout New Zealand.
- The Bob and Sheri Show – American morning drive show based in Charlotte, North Carolina. Heard on more than 50 AC stations and the American Forces Network

Former syndicated programming includes Dick Clark's US Music Survey (1996–2005), Casey's Hot 20/Casey's Countdown/American Top 20/10 (1992–2009) and Top 30 USA.

== See also ==
- Adult Contemporary, a chart appearing in Billboard since 1961. This chart is typically (but not exclusively) closer to soft AC.
- Adult Pop Airplay, a chart appearing in Billboard since 1996.
- Pop music
- Contemporary hit radio
- New-age music
- Yacht rock
