= Karla Bonoff =

American singer-songwriter

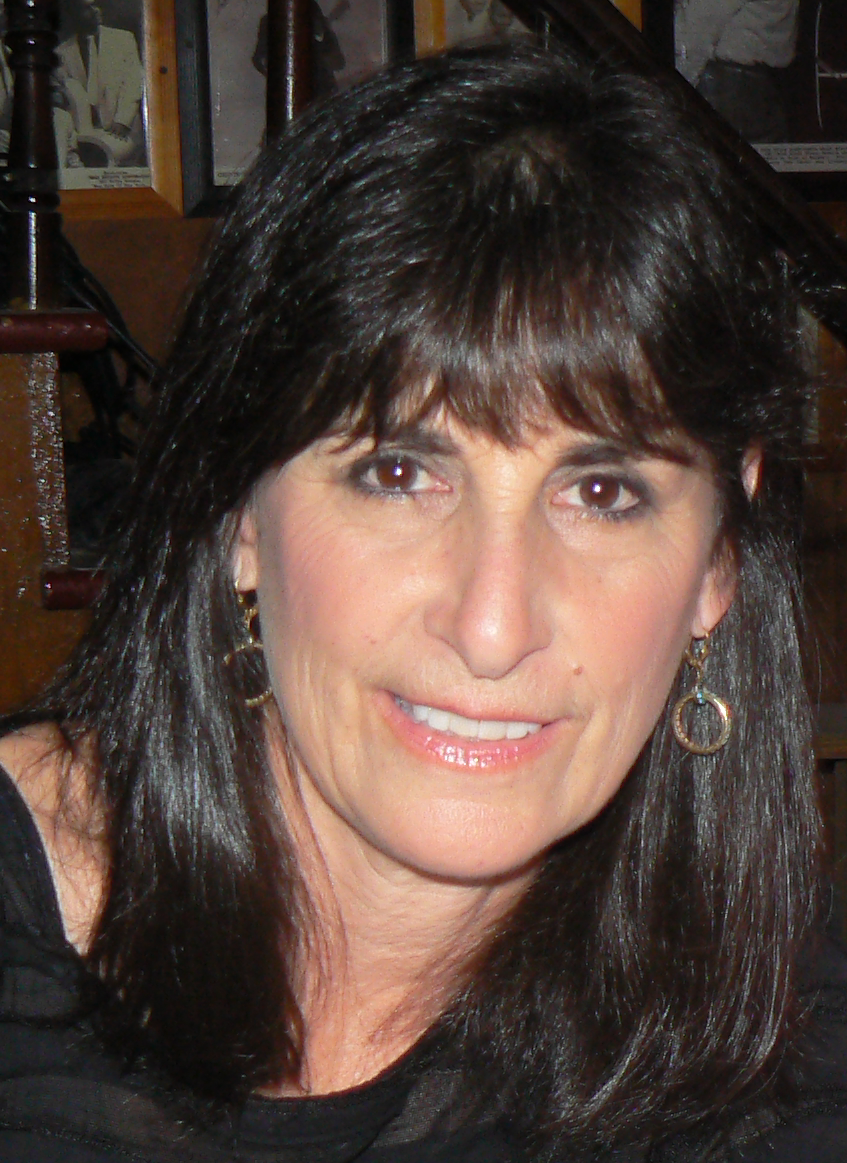
- Karla Bonoff in 2010, after a show at Knuckleheads Saloon in Kansas City, MO

Background information
- Born: Karla Bonoff; December 27, 1951 (age 74)
- Origin: Santa Monica, California, U.S.
- Genres: Folk rock; soft rock; pop rock
- Occupations: Singer-songwriter; musician
- Instruments: Vocals; piano; guitar
- Formerly of: Bryndle
- Website: karlabonoff.com

Karla Bonoff (born December 27, 1951) is an American singer-songwriter. As a vocalist and songwriter. Bonoff has released a number of albums that have established her with an enduring fan base. As a songwriter Bonoff is recognized for her songs recorded by Linda Ronstadt and others including "Home", covered by Bonnie Raitt, Trisha Yearwood, and Eliza Gilkyson, and "Tell Me Why" by Wynonna Judd "Isn't It Always Love" by Lynn Anderson and "Lose Again" by Allison Krauss.

Linda Ronstadt recorded three Bonoff songs, including on the 1976 album Hasten Down the Wind ("Someone To Lay Down Beside Me", "Lose Again" and "If He's Ever Near"), and "All My Life", a 1989 duet with Ronstadt and Aaron Neville won the 1991 Grammy Award for Best Pop Performance by a Duo or Group.

== Early life and education ==
Bonoff was born and raised in Southern California. Bonoff was born to Chester and Shirley (née Kahane) Bonoff, and named after her paternal grandfather, Karl Bonoff. Her family is Jewish, with ancestors from Russia, Hungary, Austria and Germany.

She began writing songs by the age of fifteen and performed early in her career with her sister Lisa under the name The Daughters of Chester P, named after their father, Dr. Chester Paul Bonoff. During this period, she developed an interest in guitar and studied with folk musician Frank Hamilton of The Weavers, who introduced her to traditional material including "The Water Is Wide," later associated with Bonoff's own repertoire.

By age 16, Bonoff and her sister recorded an 11-song demo for Elektra Records under the supervision of engineer Bruce Botnick. Although the recording did not result in a contract, it marked her earliest professional studio work.

== Career ==
=== Early musical career and Bryndle ===
During the 1960s and 1970s, Bonoff became involved in the Los Angeles singer-songwriter community centered around venues such as the Troubadour. She participated in informal performance circuits that contributed to the development of the California folk-rock sound.

She later co-founded the group Bryndle with Kenny Edwards, Wendy Waldman, and Andrew Gold. The group represented an early songwriter collective model that predated similar commercially successful bands of the era. Bryndle recorded material for A&M Records; however, the album was not released at the time, and the group initially disbanded. Despite this, its members went on to significant individual careers and later reconvened in various configurations.

=== Solo career ===
Bonoff was signed as a solo artist by Columbia Records in 1977. Her debut album included several songs that had already gained recognition through Linda Ronstadt's recordings, including "Someone to Lay Down Beside Me", "If He's Ever Near", and "Lose Again". Her debut also featured "I Can't Hold On", which achieved regional radio success.

She toured extensively following the release of her first album, including appearances supporting artists such as James Taylor and Jackson Browne. Critical reception during this period identified her as an emerging figure within the Los Angeles singer-songwriter movement.

Her subsequent albums, Restless Nights (1979) and Wild Heart of the Young (1982), further established her career as a vocalist and songwriter.

These recordings featured contributions from prominent session musicians and collaborators, including Russ Kunkel, Joe Walsh, Waddy Wachtel, Don Henley, Timothy B. Schmit, and others. The single "Personally", though not written by Bonoff, became one of her most commercially successful recordings, reaching #19 on the US Charts.

=== Songwriting and collaborations ===
Bonoff's songwriting gained wider recognition through interpretations by other artists. Linda Ronstadt's album Hasten Down the Wind (1976) included multiple Bonoff compositions, contributing significantly to her early reputation as a songwriter.

Her work also appeared in film and television contexts. She co-wrote material for About Last Night with JD Souther and contributed vocals to film soundtracks, including Footloose and 8 Seconds. Her 1994 recording "Standing Right Next to Me" achieved Top 10 Adult Contemporary chart success.

In 1989, Bonoff contributed songs to Linda Ronstadt's album Cry Like a Rainstorm, Howl Like the Wind, including "All My Life," which won a Grammy Award for Best Pop Performance by a Duo or Group. The song also became widely used in wedding music contexts.

=== Bryndle reunion ===
Bonoff reformed Bryndle with her original collaborators in the 1990s. The group released a self-titled album in 1995 following an extended production period, with most material credited to collective songwriting efforts. The group toured internationally, including performances in Japan and the United States.

A second album, House of Silence, was released in 2002 after production delays, including technical setbacks involving lost recordings. A live recording from a house concert was released in 2003.

=== Current career and recent releases ===
Bonoff solo touring and recording into the early 2000s, led to the recording of a live double album recorded in Santa Barbara with long-time collaborators Kenny Edwards and Nina Gerber.

In 2019, she released Carry Me Home, an album featuring re-recordings of earlier material alongside new compositions. In 2020, she released a holiday-themed album, Silent Night, which received critical recognition and was included in year-end music listings by major media outlets.

She performs year round in major music clubs and theaters in markets throughout America and internationally.

== Legacy and reception ==
Bonoff is frequently associated with the development of the Southern California singer-songwriter movement of the 1970s. Her work is recognized both through her own recordings and through the commercial success of songs interpreted by other artists.

Critical commentary has characterized her songwriting as emphasizing emotional directness, narrative clarity, and melodic structure, contributing to her sustained reputation among singer-songwriters.

== Discography ==
=== Studio albums ===
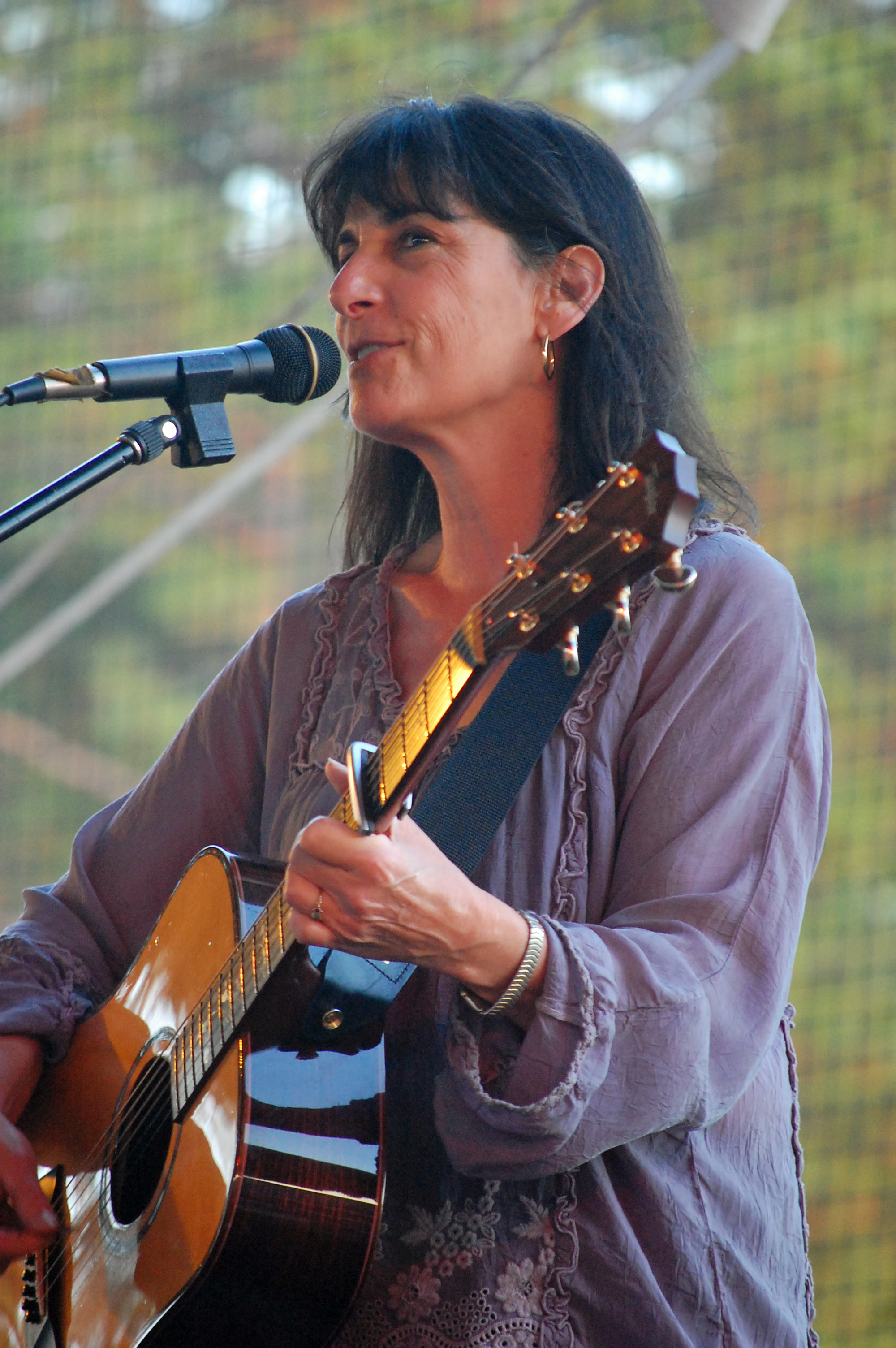
Bonoff performing in 2010

- Karla Bonoff (1977) (US #52)
- Restless Nights (1979)(US #31), (AUS #66)
- Wild Heart of the Young (1982) (US #49)
- New World (1988)
- Carry Me Home (acoustic versions) (2018)
- Silent Night (2020)

with Bryndle

- Bryndle (1995)
- House of Silence (2002)

=== Live albums ===
- Live (2007)

=== Compilations ===
- Premium Best (1988) [Japan Only]
- The Best of Karla Bonoff (1992) [Mail Order; Japan Only]
- All My Life: The Best of Karla Bonoff (1999)

=== Singles ===
Year	Song	US Hot 100	US Adult Contemporary	Canada Top 100	Canada AC	Album
1978	"I Can't Hold On"	76	-	73	-	Karla Bonoff
1978	"Isn't It Always Love"	-	-	82	-	Karla Bonoff
1978	"Rose In The Garden"	-	-	-	39	Karla Bonoff
1978	"Someone To Lay Down Beside Me"	-	-	-	-	Karla Bonoff
1979	"When You Walk in the Room"	101	-	-	-	Restless Nights
1980	"Baby Don't Go"	69	35	-	-	Restless Nights
1982	"Personally"	19	3	-	-	Wild Heart of the Young
1982	"Please Be the One"	63	22	-	-	Wild Heart of the Young
1984	"Somebody's Eyes"	109	16	-	9	Footloose soundtrack
1994	"Standing Right Next to Me"	-	38	-	-	8 Seconds soundtrack
