= All My Life (Linda Ronstadt song) =

1990 single by Linda Ronstadt

Single by Linda Ronstadt featuring Aaron Neville

from the album Cry Like a Rainstorm, Howl Like the Wind
- B-side: "Shattered"
- Released: January 1990
- Studio: Skywalker Ranch (Marin County, California)
- Length: 3:31
- Label: Elektra
- Songwriter: Karla Bonoff
- Producer: Peter Asher

Linda Ronstadt featuring Aaron Neville singles chronology
"Don't Know Much" (1989)	"All My Life" (1990)	"When Something Is Wrong with My Baby" (1990)

"All My Life" is a song written by American singer-songwriter Karla Bonoff and originally performed by Bonoff on her fourth album New World (1988). The following year, American singers Linda Ronstadt and Aaron Neville performed the song as a duet on Ronstadt's 1989 album Cry Like a Rainstorm, Howl Like the Wind. The duet version was released in January 1990 by Elektra Records, as a single and became a hit, reaching number one on the US Billboard Adult Contemporary chart as well as number 11 on both the Billboard Hot 100 and Cash Box Top 100 charts. It was also a top-10 hit in Canada and Ireland, peaking at number 10 in both countries. "All My Life" won the award for Best Pop Performance by a Duo or Group with Vocal at the 1991 Grammy Awards.

== Personnel ==
- Linda Ronstadt – vocals
- Aaron Neville – vocals
- Don Grolnick – piano
- Andrew Gold – guitar, keyboards
- Michael Landau – guitar
- Lee Sklar – bass
- Russ Kunkel – drums
- Michael Fisher – percussion
- Robbie Buchanan – keyboards
- Skywalker Symphony Orchestra arranged and conducted by David Campbell

== Charts ==
=== Weekly charts ===
Weekly chart performance for "All My Life"
Chart (1990)	Peak position
Australia (ARIA)	57
Canada Top Singles (RPM)	10
Canada Adult Contemporary (RPM)	1
Ireland (IRMA)	10
Netherlands (Dutch Top 40)	27
Netherlands (Single Top 100)	28
UK Singles (Official Charts)	96
US Billboard Hot 100	11
US Adult Contemporary (Billboard)	1
US Cash Box Top 100	11

=== Year-end charts ===
Year-end chart performance for "All My Life"
Chart (1990)	Position
Canada Top Singles (RPM)	88
Canada Adult Contemporary (RPM)	11
US Adult Contemporary (Billboard)	9

== Release history ==
Release dates and formats for "All My Life"
Region	Date	Format(s)	Label(s)	Ref.
United States	January 1990	—N/a	Elektra	
Australia	March 26, 1990	7-inch vinyl; CD; cassette	Asylum	
Japan	April 10, 1990	Mini-CD	Warner Music Japan	
