= Don't Know Much =

1980 song by Barry Mann

Song by Barry Mann

from the album Barry Mann
- Released: 1980
- Length: 2:53
- Label: Casablanca
- Songwriters: Barry Mann; Cynthia Weil; Tom Snow
- Producers: Barry Mann; Brooks Arthur

"Don't Know Much" (also titled as "All I Need to Know" on other versions) is a song written by Barry Mann, Cynthia Weil and Tom Snow. Mann was the first to record the song in 1980, gaining a minor chart hit in the US. The song was made famous when it was covered as a duet by Linda Ronstadt and Aaron Neville in 1989. Their version was a worldwide success, topping the Irish Singles Chart and reaching the top 10 in several territories.

== History ==
The song first appeared on Barry Mann's self-titled 1980 album, released on Casablanca Records. Bill Medley had a Billboard Hot 100 chart success with it, rising to number 88 in April 1981. The next month, the song reached number 29 on the Adult Contemporary chart. Bette Midler recorded a version with changed lyrics under the title "All I Need to Know", charting at number 77 in 1983.

In 2000, Barry Mann re-recorded the song with Brenda Russell on his album Soul and Inspiration, released on Atlantic Records.

== Bill Medley version ==
"Don't Know Much"

Single by Bill Medley

from the album Sweet Thunder
- B-side: "Woman"; Same song (Promotional releases only)
- Released: 1981
- Length: 3:07
- Label: Liberty
- Songwriters: Barry Mann; Cynthia Weil; Tom Snow
- Producer: Michael Lloyd

Bill Medley singles chronology
"Statue of a Fool" (1979)	"Don't Know Much" (1981)	"Right Here and Now" (1982)

In 1981, American singer-songwriter Bill Medley covered the song for his eighth studio album, Sweet Thunder. Medley's version was a minor hit, reaching number 88 on the Billboard Hot 100 and number 29 on the Adult Contemporary chart.

=== Charts ===
Chart (1981)	Peak position
US Billboard Hot 100	88
US Hot Adult Contemporary (Billboard)	29

== Bette Midler version ==
"All I Need to Know"

Single by Bette Midler

from the album No Frills
- B-side: "My Eye on You"
- Released: 1983
- Length: 4:08
- Label: Atlantic
- Songwriters: Barry Mann; Cynthia Weil; Tom Snow
- Producer: Chuck Plotkin

Bette Midler singles chronology
"Chapel of Love (Live)" (1980)	"All I Need to Know" (1983)	"Favorite Waste of Time" (1983)

In 1983, American actress and singer Bette Midler covered the song for her 1983 album No Frills under the title "All I Need to Know", with changed lyrics. Midler's version reached number 39 on the Billboard Hot Adult Contemporary chart, number 77 on the Billboard Hot 100, and number 5 on the RPM Adult Contemporary chart, having its highest peak there.

=== Charts ===
Chart (1983)	Peak position
Canada Adult Contemporary (RPM)	5
US Billboard Hot 100	77
US Hot Adult Contemporary (Billboard)	39

== Linda Ronstadt and Aaron Neville version ==
"Don't Know Much"

Single by Linda Ronstadt and Aaron Neville

from the album Cry Like a Rainstorm, Howl Like the Wind
- B-side: "Cry Like a Rainstorm"
- Released: September 12, 1989
- Studio: Skywalker Ranch (Marin County, California)
- Genre: Pop
- Length: 3:35
- Label: Elektra
- Songwriters: Barry Mann; Cynthia Weil; Tom Snow
- Producers: Peter Asher; Steve Tyrell

Linda Ronstadt singles chronology
"Wildflowers" (1988)	"Don't Know Much" (1989)	"All My Life" (1990)

Aaron Neville singles chronology
"The Greatest Love" (1978)	"Don't Know Much" (1989)	"All My Life" (1990)

Music video
- "Don't Know Much" on YouTube

The song was covered on Linda Ronstadt's triple-platinum 1989 album Cry Like a Rainstorm, Howl Like the Wind in a duet with Aaron Neville. It was introduced to Ronstadt and Neville by Steve Tyrell. Co-produced by Tyrell and Peter Asher, it was released as a single in the United States in 1989, peaking at number two on the Billboard Hot 100 and number one on the Hot Adult Contemporary Tracks chart. The single was Ronstadt's 10th and last top-10 hit and was certified gold, eventually selling over 900,000 copies in the United States. In the United Kingdom, the song peaked at number two on the UK Singles Chart. It also peaked at number one in Ireland, number two in Australia, and reached the top five in Austria, Belgium, Canada, the Netherlands, and New Zealand.

"Don't Know Much" won Ronstadt and Neville the 1990 Grammy Award for Best Pop Performance by a Duo or Group with Vocal and was nominated for Song of the Year.

=== Critical reception ===
"Don't Know Much" received favorable reviews from music critics. American magazine Billboard deemed it "a strong send-off" from the album. Swedish Expressen called it "heavenly", adding, "What a lovesong." Robin Katz from Music Week complimented it as a "brilliant insight into aging." Cary Darling from Orange County Register labeled it as a "soaring, wide-screen ballad." Jan DeKnock of Orlando Sentinel described it as "a killer ballad." A reviewer from People Magazine felt "their voices fuse like sunlight beaming through a stained-glass window." James Hunter of Rolling Stone praised it as "brilliant". Californian Santa Cruz Sentinel called it a "tender love ballad duet." Ken Tucker from Spin declared it as "a pretty Barry Mann-Cynthia Weil weeper."

=== Music video ===
In the accompanying music video for "Don't Know Much", both Neville and Ronstadt portray a middle-aged couple that are remembering their past and all the difficulties that they seem to have faced together.

=== Track listings ===
7-inch single, Europe (1989)
No.	Title	Length
1.	"Don't Know Much"	3:33
2.	"Hurt So Bad"	3:17

12-inch single, UK (1989)
No.	Title	Length
1.	"Don't Know Much"	3:33
2.	"Hurt So Bad"	3:17
3.	"I Can't Let Go"	2:44

=== Personnel ===
- Linda Ronstadt, Aaron Neville – vocals, vocal harmonies
- Don Grolnick – acoustic piano
- Michael Landau – electric guitar
- Leland Sklar – bass
- Carlos Vega – drums
- Michael Fisher – percussion
- The Skywalker Symphony Orchestra arranged by David Campbell; concertmaster – Pavel Farkas

=== Charts ===
==== Weekly charts ====
Chart (1989–1990)	Peak position
Australia (ARIA)	2
Austria (Ö3 Austria Top 40)	3
Belgium (Ultratop 50 Flanders)	4
Canada Top Singles (RPM)	5
Canada Adult Contemporary (RPM)	1
Europe (Eurochart Hot 100)	10
Finland (Suomen virallinen lista)	13
Ireland (IRMA)	1
Italy Airplay (Music & Media)	20
Netherlands (Dutch Top 40)	6
Netherlands (Single Top 100)	6
New Zealand (Recorded Music NZ)	4
UK Singles (Official Charts)	2
US Billboard Hot 100	2
US Adult Contemporary (Billboard)	1
West Germany (GfK)	34

==== Year-end charts ====
Chart (1989)	Position
UK Singles (OCC)	23

Chart (1990)	Position
Australia (ARIA)	12
Belgium (Ultratop)	70
Canada Top Singles (RPM)	66
Canada Adult Contemporary (RPM)	93
Netherlands (Dutch Top 40)	83
US Billboard Hot 100	20
US Adult Contemporary (Billboard)	24

=== Certifications ===
Region	Certification	Certified units/sales
Australia (ARIA)	Platinum	70,000^{^}
United States (RIAA)	Gold	500,000^{^}
^{^} Shipments figures based on certification alone.
