= Cry Like a Rainstorm, Howl Like the Wind =

Studio album by Linda Ronstadt featuring Aaron Neville
- Released: October 2, 1989
- Recorded: March–August 1989
- Studios: Skywalker Ranch, Marin County
- Genres: Pop rock; soft rock
- Length: 43:02
- Labels: Elektra Records; WEA International
- Producer: Peter Asher

Linda Ronstadt featuring Aaron Neville chronology
Canciones de Mi Padre (1987)	Cry Like a Rainstorm, Howl Like the Wind (1989)	Mas Canciones (1991)

Singles from Cry Like a Rainstorm, Howl Like the Wind
- 1. "Don't Know Much" Released: September 1989; 2. "All My Life" Released: January 1990; 3. "When Something Is Wrong with My Baby" Released: May 1990; 4. "Adios" Released: August 1990

Professional ratings
Review scores
Source	Rating
AllMusic	2.5/5 stars
Chicago Tribune	2/4 stars
Los Angeles Times	3/5 stars
Music Week	(favorable)
Orlando Sentinel	2/5 stars
People Magazine	(favorable)
Rolling Stone	4/5 stars
Spin	(favorable)
The Vancouver Sun	3/5 stars

Cry Like a Rainstorm, Howl Like the Wind is a studio album by American singer/producer Linda Ronstadt, released October 2, 1989 by Elektra Records. Produced by Peter Asher, the album features several duets with singer Aaron Neville — two of which earned Grammy Awards — and several songs written by Jimmy Webb and Karla Bonoff. The album was a major success internationally. It sold over three million copies and was certified Triple Platinum in the United States alone.

== Composition ==
Cry Like a Rainstorm, Howl Like the Wind is a diverse collection of songs in the rock, R&B, and pop genres. In addition, the album contains a few ballads, most notably Jimmy Webb's "Adios". Of the twelve tracks, Ronstadt included four duets with Aaron Neville, of Neville Brothers fame. In addition, the album is noted for its big production values, including backing musicians the Skywalker Symphony, the Tower of Power horns, and the Oakland Interfaith Gospel Choir. There are also tracks by songwriters Jimmy Webb, Karla Bonoff, and an appearance of Brian Wilson, as backup singer and musical arranger on Ronstadt's fourteenth Top 10 Adult Contemporary single, "Adios". The album's arrangers include Marty Paich, David Campbell, Jimmy Webb, Greg Adams, and Terrance Kelly.

== Reception ==
Cry Like a Rainstorm, Howl Like the Wind received mixed reviews, despite its commercial success with the Gold-certified hit single "Don't Know Much". "Don't Know Much" and "All My Life", both duets with Neville, won Grammy Awards in 1990 and 1991 respectively for Best Pop Vocal Performance by a Duo or Group. The album's recording engineer and mixer George Massenburg won the 1990 Grammy Award for Best Engineered Album, Non-Classical, and the album itself also earned Ronstadt a 1990 Grammy nomination for Best Pop Vocal Performance, Female alongside Bette Midler, Bonnie Raitt, Gloria Estefan, and Paula Abdul. It reached number seven on the US Billboard 200, spending over a year on the chart and being certified triple Platinum in the United States.

Cry Like a Rainstorm, Howl Like the Wind became one of Ronstadt's three biggest selling studio albums in the United States (along with Simple Dreams and What's New). It is also one of her biggest selling albums worldwide, especially in Australia and the United Kingdom, selling over 100,000 copies (certified gold).

When the album reached the Billboard Top 10 in late 1989, Ronstadt became only the second female recording artist in history to achieve ten Top 10 albums, following Barbra Streisand.

== Track listing ==
No.	Title	Writer(s)	Length
1.	"Still Within the Sound of My Voice"	Jimmy Webb	4:32
2.	"Cry Like a Rainstorm"	Eric Kaz	3:36
3.	"All My Life"	Karla Bonoff	3:36
4.	"I Need You"	Paul Carrack, Nick Lowe, Martin Belmont	2:52
5.	"Don't Know Much"	Barry Mann, Cynthia Weil, Tom Snow	3:35
6.	"Adios"	Webb	3:36
7.	"Trouble Again"	Bonoff, Kenny Edwards	3:19
8.	"I Keep it Hid"	Webb	3:58
9.	"So Right, So Wrong"	Carrack, Lowe, Belmont, J. E. Ceiling, James Eller	3:28
10.	"Shattered"	Webb	2:54
11.	"When Something Is Wrong with My Baby"	Isaac Hayes, David Porter	3:52
12.	"Goodbye My Friend"	Bonoff	3:44
Total length:			43:02

== Personnel ==
=== Musicians ===
- Linda Ronstadt – lead and harmony vocals, backing vocals (4)
- Aaron Neville – lead and harmony vocals (3–5, 11)
- Jimmy Webb – acoustic piano (1), orchestral arrangements (6)
- Robbie Buchanan – keyboards (1, 3, 4, 7, 10–12), organ (2, 4)
- Don Grolnick – acoustic piano (2, 3, 5, 7–12), keyboards (6)
- William D. "Smitty" Smith – electric piano (4)
- Michael Landau – electric guitar (1–9, 11, 12)
- Dean Parks – electric guitar (1, 2, 4, 6–11)
- Andrew Gold – electric guitar (3), 12-string electric guitar (7), guitars (12)
- Leland Sklar – bass (1, 4, 5, 9, 12)
- David Hungate – bass (2, 3, 6, 8, 10, 11)
- Carlos Vega – drums (1–6, 8–11)
- Russ Kunkel – drums (7, 12)
- Michael Fisher – percussion (1, 5, 7, 9)
- Peter Asher – percussion (7)
- Tower of Power – horns (11)
- Marty Paich – orchestral arrangements and conductor (1, 2, 8, 10)
- Terrance Kelly – choir arrangements and conductor (2, 8, 9)
- David Campbell – orchestral arrangements (3, 5, 7, 12), conductor (3–7, 11, 12)
- Greg Adams – orchestral arrangements (4, 11), horn arrangements (11), conductor (11)
- The Skywalker Symphony Orchestra – orchestra (1–8, 10–12)
- Pavel Farkas – concertmaster (1–8, 10, 11, 12)
- Rosemary Butler – additional backing vocals (2), backing vocals (4, 7)
- Oakland Interfaith Gospel Choir – choir (2, 8, 9)
- Jon Joyce – backing vocals (4)
- Arnold McCuller – backing vocals (4)
- Brian Wilson – backing vocals (6), arrangements (6)

=== Production ===
- Peter Asher – producer
- Steve Tyrell – co-producer (Track 5)
- George Massenburg – recording, mixing
- Frank Wolf – additional recording
- Bob Edwards – assistant engineer
- Sharon Rice – assistant engineer
- Mike Ross – assistant engineer
- Jim Schelter – assistant engineer
- Doug Sax – mastering at The Mastering Lab (Hollywood, California)
- Ivy Skoff – production coordination
- John Kosh – art direction, design
- Robert Blakeman – photography
- Cathy Kerr – personal assistant
- Janet Stark – personal assistant
- Charles Barber – assistant to Marty Paich
- Jeff Beal – orchestra musical coordinator
- Greg Sudmeier – orchestra musical coordinator

== Charts ==
=== Weekly charts ===
Weekly chart performance for Cry Like a Rainstorm, Howl Like the Wind
Chart (1989)	Peak position
Australian Albums (ARIA)	11
Austrian Albums (Ö3 Austria)	24
Canada Top Albums/CDs (RPM)	6
Dutch Albums (Album Top 100)	13
New Zealand Albums (RMNZ)	41
UK Albums Chart	43
US Billboard 200	7

=== Year-end charts ===
Year-end chart performance for Cry Like a Rainstorm, Howl Like the Wind
Chart (1990)	Peak position
Australian Albums (ARIA)	70
Canada Top Albums/CDs (RPM)	38
US Billboard 200	14

== Certifications ==
Certifications for Cry Like a Rainstorm, Howl Like the Wind
Region	Certification	Certified units/sales
Australia (ARIA)	Platinum	70,000^{^}
Canada (Music Canada)	Platinum	100,000^{^}
United Kingdom (BPI)	Gold	100,000^{^}
United States (RIAA)	3× Platinum	3,000,000^{^}
^{^} Shipments figures based on certification alone.

== Release history ==
Release history and formats for Cry Like a Rainstorm, Howl Like the Wind
Region	Date	Format	Label	Ref.
North America	October 2, 1989	LP; CD; cassette	Elektra Records	
