= All Tied Up (song) =

Single by Ronnie McDowell

from the album All Tied Up in Love
- B-side: "Strings of Silver Satin"
- Released: April 1986
- Recorded: 1985
- Genre: Country
- Length: 2:56
- Label: MCA/Curb
- Songwriter(s): Buddy Killen; Ronnie McDowell; Joe Meador
- Producer(s): Buddy Killen

Ronnie McDowell singles chronology
"Love Talks" (1985)	"All Tied Up" (1986)	"When You Hurt, I Hurt" (1986)

"All Tied Up" is a song co-written and recorded by American country music artist Ronnie McDowell. It was released in April 1986 as the first single and partial title track from his album All Tied Up in Love. The song reached #6 on the Billboard Hot Country Singles chart in July 1986 and #1 on the RPM Country Tracks chart in Canada. It was written by McDowell, Buddy Killen and Joe Meador.

== Chart performance ==
Chart (1986)	Peak position
US Hot Country Songs (Billboard)	6
Canadian RPM Country Tracks	1
