= Ronnie McDowell =

American country artist, songwriter and actor

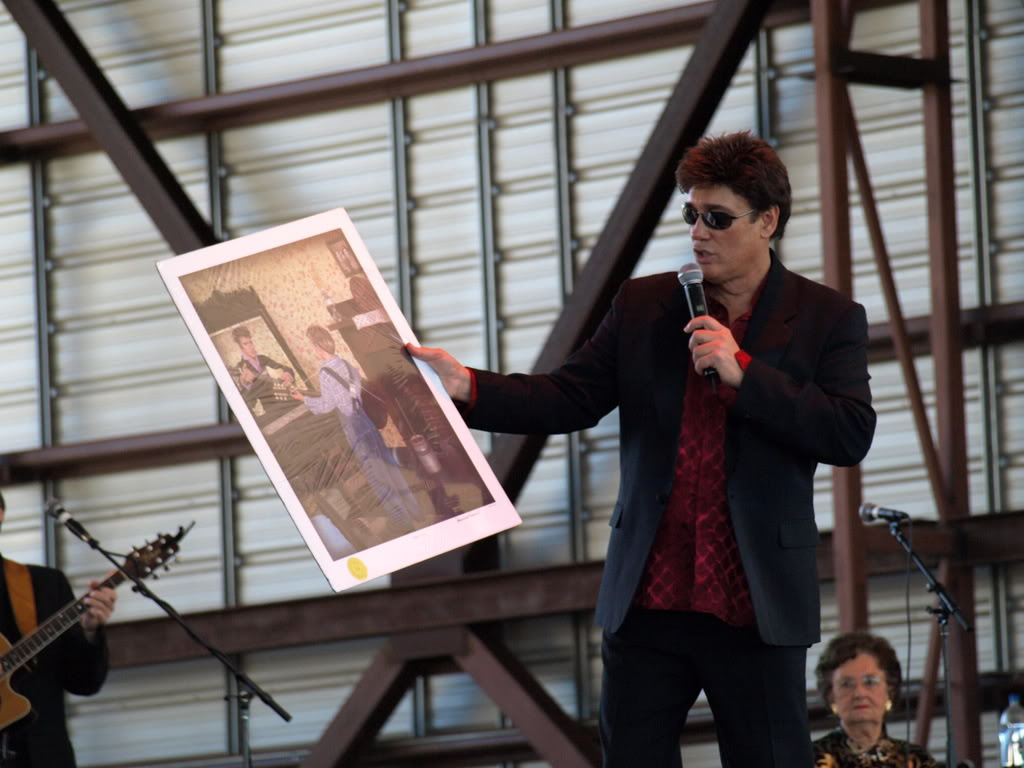
- Ronnie McDowell presenting his Reflections of a King print during a concert in Florida, 2007.

Background information
- Born: Ronald Dean McDowell; March 25, 1950 (age 76)
- Origin: Portland, Tennessee, U.S.
- Genres: Country
- Occupations: Recording artist, painter
- Instrument: Vocals
- Years active: 1977–present
- Labels: Scorpion, Epic, MCA, Curb
- Website: Official website

Ronald Dean McDowell Sr. (born March 25, 1950) is an American country music artist. His first major hit occurred in 1977 with his self-penned Elvis Presley tribute "The King is Gone." McDowell charted more than 30 top-40 hits on the Billboard country music charts. Two of his singles – "Older Women" and "You're Gonna Ruin My Bad Reputation" — reached number one on the country charts, while 11 more reached top 10. He has also released more than 20 studio albums, and has been signed to Curb Records since 1986.

== U.S. Navy ==
McDowell served in the US Navy from 1968-72. He served on board the USS Hancock and USS Kitty Hawk.

== Career ==
Following the death of Elvis Presley in 1977, McDowell, a devoted fan of Presley’s, recorded a song that became his first country and only pop hit with his self-penned tribute song "The King Is Gone", which he recorded on the independent Scorpion record label. The record took off immediately, gaining airplay on country and pop radio stations across the United States and around the world.

It peaked at number 13 on Billboard's Hot 100 singles, and became a gold record. In January 1978, McDowell performed the song on the NBC special, Nashville Remembers Elvis on His Birthday, in which he appeared alongside a number of Presley's contemporaries. To date, "The King Is Gone" has sold more than five million copies.

McDowell was commissioned to cover a number of Presley's songs for the soundtrack to 1979 made-for-TV Presley biography film Elvis, during which Kurt Russell, portraying Presley, lip-synched to McDowell's vocals. He actually recorded 36 songs, but not all of them were used in the film. McDowell also sang the Presley vocals for the 1981 TV movie Elvis and the Beauty Queen and for the 1988 TV miniseries Elvis and Me. All of the Presley's vocals for the 1990 TV series, Elvis, were performed by McDowell. McDowell also contributed to the 1997 Showtime special, Elvis Meets Nixon.

He scored a second hit for the Scorpion label entitled "I Love You, I Love You, I Love You" before being signed by CBS Records Epic in 1979. McDowell charted a string of hit singles and albums for Epic between 1979 and 1986. Every single release, except one, became a top-10 hit, including "Older Women" and "You're Gonna Ruin My Bad Reputation". Other hits during his Epic years included "Watching Girls Go By", "Personally", "You Made A Wanted Man Of Me", "Wandering Eyes", "All Tied Up", and "In a New York Minute".

Moving to Curb Records in 1986, McDowell scored a top-10 hit with "It's Only Make Believe", a duet with Conway Twitty on what had been Twitty's breakthrough rock and roll hit in 1958. Initially, a member of McDowell's back-up band would substitute for Twitty during live performances. Recently, however, McDowell has performed the song live with Twitty's recorded voice, followed by a solo from a member of the back-up band.

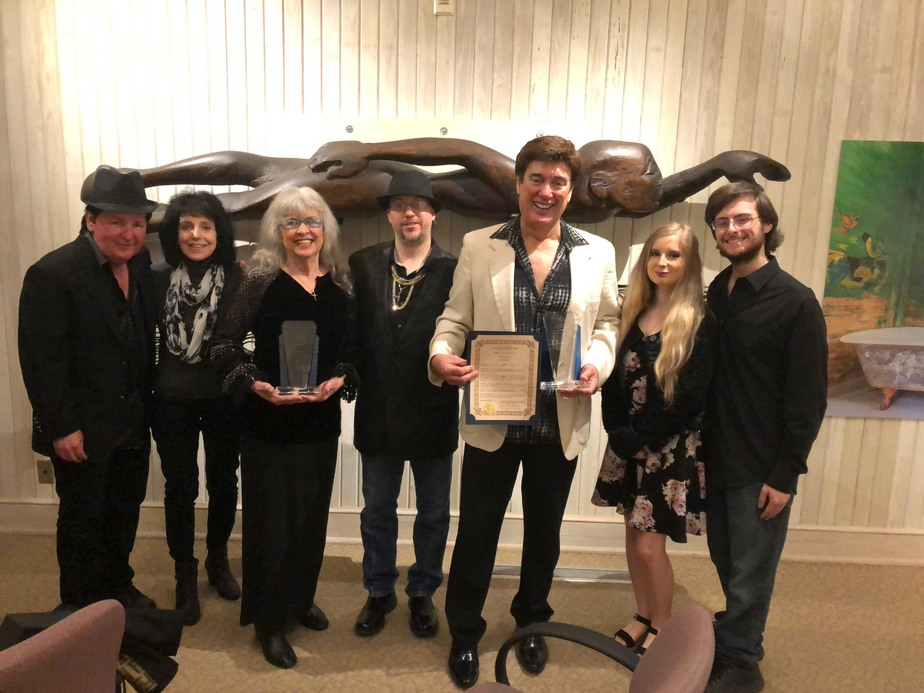
Ronnie McDowell at MMP Music Award and Hall of Fame Ceremony

In 1988, he teamed with Jerry Lee Lewis for a duet that McDowell wrote, entitled "You're Never Too Old to Rock 'n' Roll". He recorded yet another top-10 hit with his cover version of the pop standard "Unchained Melody", which also became a number-one country music video. He started appearing in larger venues and touring before headlining his own shows.

In 2002, McDowell recorded two albums for Curb Records, one consisting of beach music with Rock & Roll Hall of Famer Bill Pinkney's Original Drifters, Ronnie McDowell with Bill Pinkney's Original Drifters. The second project, a country album, entitled Ronnie McDowell Country, is a collection of six new McDowell=penned songs and a few country standards.

In January 2017, McDowell collaborated with Richard Lynch on a military tribute duet, "Love Tattoo".

On January 17, 2018, he unveiled The Magic Moment, his original painting of Presley getting his first guitar at the Tupelo Hardware Store in Tupelo, thus kicking off the pilot for his forthcoming TV show, entitled Ronnie McDowell Painting America.

On January 22, 2019, McDowell was inducted into the Mississippi Music Project Hall of Fame in Biloxi, Mississippi, and was awarded the MMP Music Award for his lifelong commitment to the music industry, by Commander Joseph W. Clark.

In 2023, a collaboration with Dolly Parton and the Jordanaires, “I Dreamed About Elvis” (credited to Dolly Parton with Ronnie McDowell and special guests the Jordanaires), was released on Parton’s 2023 album Rockstar. When McDowell’s contributions were recorded is unknown, but the Jordanaires’ vocals would have to have been recorded at some point prior to 2013, when group leader/first tenor Gordon Stoker died and the group disbanded.

== Personal life ==
Ronnie McDowell resides in Hendersonville, Tennessee. He has five children. His son, Tyler Dean McDowell, was also signed to Curb Records. Another son, Ronnie Jr. and a nephew, Chris, recorded in a band called Six Shooter on Curb in 1991.

In June 2025, McDowell experienced difficulty speaking and singing at a concert in Oley, Pennsylvania, and was hospitalized for apparent signs of a stroke. Son Ronnie Jr. posted on Facebook on June 26 that his father was recovering.
