= 3 (disambiguation) =

3 is a number, numeral, and glyph.

3, three, or III commonly refers to:

- 0s, the third year of the AD era
- 3 BC, the third year before the AD era
- March, the third month

3, three, or III may also refer to:

== Books ==
- 3, a 2004 novel by Julie Hilden
- Three, a 1946 novel by William Sansom
- Three, a 1970 novel by Sylvia Ashton-Warner
- Three, a collection of three plays by Lillian Hellman
- Three (comics), a graphic novel by Kieron Gillen
- Three (novel), a 2003 suspense novel by Ted Dekker
- Three By Flannery O'Connor, collection Flannery O'Connor bibliography
- Three of Them (Russian: Трое, literally, "three"), a 1901 novel by Maksim Gorky

== Brands ==
- 3 (telecommunications), a global telecommunications brand
  - 3Arena (Dublin), indoor amphitheatre in Ireland operating with the "3" brand
  - 3Arena (Stockholm), a stadium in Sweden operating with the "3" brand
  - 3 Hong Kong, telecommunications company operating in Hong Kong
  - Three Australia, Australian telecommunications company
  - Three Ireland, Irish telecommunications company
  - Three UK, British telecommunications and internet service provider
  - Wind Tre, Italian telecommunications company

== Film ==
- Three (1965 film), a Yugoslavian film by Aleksandar Petrović
- Three (1969 film), starring Charlotte Rampling and Sam Waterston
- Three (2002 film), an Asian horror movie collaboration
- 3: The Dale Earnhardt Story, a 2004 television movie
- Survival Island or Three, 2005, starring Billy Zane and Kelly Brook
- Three (2006 film), based on the novel with the same name
- Three (2008 film), an Indian Telugu-language film
- Three: Love, Lies, Betrayal, a 2009 Indian Hindi-language film starring Aashish Chaudhary, Nausheen Ali Sardar and Akshay Kapoor
- Three (2010 film), a German film also known as 3
- Super (2010 Indian film), starring Upendra, officially known as 👌 (sometimes read as Three)
- 3 (1996 film), an Italian film also known as Tre
- 3 (2012 Indian film), an Indian Tamil-language film starring Dhanush and Shruti Haasan
- 3 (2012 Uruguayan film), a Uruguayan drama directed by Pablo Stoll
- Three (2016 film), a Hong Kong-Chinese film by Johnnie To
- Dandupalya 3, or III, a 2018 Indian Kannada-language film starring Pooja Gandhi, third in the Dandupalya series
- Three (2020 film), Kazakh-South Korean film
- The Three (film), a 2020 Russian film
- III (film), a 2022 Canadian film

== Television ==
- Channel 3 (disambiguation)
- Three (TV series), a 1998 American series
- 3 (TV series), a 2012 CBS reality television series
- "3" (The X-Files), a 1994 episode
- BBC Three, a British television channel
- Three (TV channel), a New Zealand television channel
- Channel 3 HD (Thailand), a Thai television channel
- Antena 3 (Spain), a Spanish television channel
- Three, a character from the fifth season of Battle for Dream Island, an animated web series

== Music ==
=== Music theory and notation ===
- The mediant, the third note in a major or minor scale, often called a third and notated III or iii
- A triad (music), a chord with three notes, usually spaced in thirds
- A triplet, a type of tuplet, where a beat is split into three spaces

=== Artists ===
- 3 (1980s band), a rock band of Keith Emerson, Robert Berry and Carl Palmer
- 3 (American band), an experimental progressive band based in Woodstock, New York
- III, the Inti Creates sound team
- Three (band), a post hardcore band signed to Dischord Records
- Three, a 1960s avant-garde jazz group fronted by Don Francks
- Thriii, an American girl group composed of China Anne McClain, Sierra McClain, and Lauryn McClain
- BK3, Three or 3, a band with Bill Kreutzmann, Scott Murawski and Oteil Burbridge
- Chris Fehn, American musician, known by the pseudonym "#3" when performing with Slipknot

=== Albums ===
==== 3 ====
- 3 (Alejandro Sanz album), 1995
- 3 (soundtrack), by Anirudh Ravichander, a soundtrack for the 2012 Tamil film of the same name
- 3 (The Atomic Bitchwax album), 2005
- 3 (Bo Bice album), 2010
- 3 (Buffalo Killers album), 2011
- 3 (The Butchies album), 2001
- 3 (Calogero album), 2004
- 3 (FireHouse album), 1995
- 3 (honeyhoney album), 2015
- 3 (Ich Troje album), 1999
- 3 (Indochine album), 1985
- 3 (Mastedon album), 2009
- 3 (Murat Boz album), 2024
- 3 (Netsky album), 2009 (also stylised III)
- 3 (Ngaiire album), 2021
- 3 (Nouvelle Vague album), 2009
- 3 (Pole album), 2000
- 3 (Tricot album), 2017
- 3 (Typical Cats album), 2012
- 3 (Soulfly album), 2002
- 3 (Violent Femmes album), 1989
- 3, by Final, 2006
- 3, by Peace Love & Pitbulls, 1997
- #3 (The Script album), 2012
- #3 (Shakespears Sister album), 2004
- #3 (Suburban Kids with Biblical Names album), 2005
- 3 EPs, by Tall Dwarfs, 1994
- 3's, by Smile Empty Soul, 2012
- 3rd (The Rasmus EP), 1996
- BK3 (album) by Bruce Kulick, 2010
- Focus 3, by Focus, 1972
- 3, by Car Seat Headrest, 2010

==== III ====
- III (Bad Books album), 2019
- III (BadBadNotGood album), 2014
- III (Banks album), 2019
- III (Gui Boratto album), 2011
- III (Bosse-de-Nage album), 2012
- III (Chad Brock album), 2001
- III (Crystal Castles album), 2012
- III (Download album), 1997
- III (Espers album), 2009
- III (Eths album), 2012
- III (Family Force 5 album), 2011
- III (Foster the People EP), 2017
- III (Fuzz album), 2020
- III (JoJo EP), 2015
- III (Haloo Helsinki! album), 2011
- III (Hillsong Young & Free album), 2018
- III (The Lumineers album), 2019
- III (Makthaverskan album), 2017
- III (Maylene and the Sons of Disaster album), 2009
- III (Moderat album), 2016
- III (Moistboyz album), 2002
- III (Stanton Moore album), 2006
- III (Joe Nichols album), 2005
- III (Orbital EP), 1991
- III (Sahg album), 2010
- III (Shiny Toy Guns album), 2012
- III (Bob Sinclar album), 2003
- iii (Miike Snow album), 2016
- III (S.O.S. Band album), 1982
- III (Take That album), 2014
- III, by Dany Bédar, 2008
- III, by Demons & Wizards, 2020
- III, by Masked Intruder, 2019
- iii, by Milosh, 2008
- III, by Mt. Egypt, 2009
- III, by Siam Shade, 1996
- III, by Xerath, 2014
- Billy Talent III, by Billy Talent, 2009
- Chicago III, by Chicago, 1971
- Cypress Hill III: Temples of Boom, by Cypress Hill, 1995
- Danzig III: How the Gods Kill, by Danzig, 1992
- Led Zeppelin III, by Led Zeppelin, 1970
- Santana (1971 album), Santana, 1971 (often referred to as III or Santana III)
- Sebadoh III, by Sebadoh, 1991
- Van Halen III, by Van Halen, 1998
- Black Widow III, by Black Widow, 1972

==== Three ====
- Three (The Black Heart Procession album), 2000
- Three (Blue Man Group album), 2016
- Three (The John Butler Trio album), 2001
- Three (Charlotte Church EP), 2013
- Three (Four Tet album), 2024
- Three (Gloriana album), 2015
- Three (Bob James album), 1976
- Three (Nine Days album), 1998
- Three (Ph.D. album), 2009
- Three (Phantogram album), 2016
- Three (Joel Plaskett album), 2009
- Three (Sugababes album), 2003
- Three (Tubeless Hearts album), 1994
- Three (U2 EP), 1979
- Three, by APB (band), 2007
- Three, by Armageddon (Swedish band), 2002
- Three, by Honey, 2001
- Threes (album), by Sparta, 2006

=== Songs ===
- "3" (Britney Spears song), 2009
- "3" (Disturbed song), 2011
- "3", by The Dissociatives from I Can't Believe it's Not Rock, 2000
- "3", by Flume from Skin, 2016
- "3", by Scott Storch, 2021
- "3", by Ultravox from the B-side of "Same Old Story", 1986
- ".3", by Porcupine Tree from In Absentia, 2002
- "Song 3", by Stone Sour, 2017
- "Song 3" (Babymetal and Slaughter to Prevail song), 2025
- "Song 3", by Robbie Williams from Escapology, 2002
- "III", by Foster the People from Sacred Hearts Club, 2017
- "III", by Sleep Theory from Afterglow, 2025
- "Tres" (song) (English: 'Three'), by Juanes from La Vida... Es un Ratico, 2008
- "Three", by Future and Young Thug from Super Slimey, 2017
- "Three", by Jimmy Newman, 1969
- "Three", by Karma to Burn from Wild, Wonderful Purgatory, 1999
- "Three", by Lily Allen from No Shame, 2018
- "Three", by Massive Attack from Protection, 1994
- "Three", by Strawberry Alarm Clock, 1969
- "Song Three", from the Mahagonny-Songspiel

=== Other music ===
- E (video), stylized Ǝ, video album by Eminem
- 3 Songs (disambiguation)
- The Three E.P.'s, a 1998 The Beta Band album

== Science, technology, and mathematics ==
- Polyvinyl chloride (resin identification code "3")
- 3, the DVD region code for many East Asian countries (except for Japan and China)
- Group 3 element, often written as III
- A superscript 3 (^{3}), used to represent the cubing of a number
- Equilateral triangle (Schläfli symbol 3)
- Giant star (III), in the Yerkes spectral classification
- 3 Juno, an asteroid in the asteroid belt

== Transportation ==
=== Automobiles ===
- BMW 3 Series, a German compact luxury car
- Chery Arrizo 3, a Chinese subcompact sedan
- Chery Tiggo 3, a Chinese compact SUV
- Haima 3, a Chinese compact car
- JAC Yiwei 3, a Chinese hatchback
- Lynk & Co 03, a Chinese subcompact crossover
- Mazda3, a Japanese compact sedan
- MG 3, a British-Chinese subcompact hatchback
- Peugeot Type 3, a French steam-powered car
- Qoros 3, a Chinese compact car
- Tesla Model 3, an American compact electric sedan
- Volkswagen Type 3, a German compact car

=== Roads and routes ===
- 3 (New York City Subway service), a service of the New York City Subway
- List of highways numbered 3
- Line 3 (disambiguation)

== Other uses ==
- 3, Triq ix-Xatt, a nineteenth-century building in Marsaskala, Malta
- Company (musical), originally titled Threes
- The small forward position in basketball, also called the 3
- Three, a personality type of the Enneagram of Personality typology
- "The Three", from the second book of Samuel in the Old Testament; see David's Mighty Warriors
- Three-point field goal, a long shot in basketball
- Threes, a game on the iPhone
- Threes Above High, a dive bar in Columbus, Ohio, US
- 3, representation of Arabic ayin in Arabizi (Arabic chat alphabet)

== Similar glyphs ==
- Open-mid central unrounded vowel, ɜ, of the International Phonetic Alphabet (IPA), used in Cherokee and some English pronunciation
- Ezh (letter), Ʒ, a symbol for dram
  - Lowercase ezh, ʒ, representing the Voiced palato-alveolar sibilant of the IPA, used in several African languages
- Dram (unit) (ℨ) and Gothic font letter Z
- Yogh or Ȝ, letter used in Middle English and Middle Scots
- Gyfu or Gar (rune) Anglo Saxon runes transliterated as ȝ
- Ze (Cyrillic) or З, eleventh letter of Kazakh, tenth letter of Ukrainian, Dungan, ninth letter of Russian, Belarusian, Uzbek, Serbo-Croatian, Mongolian, eighth letter of Bulgarian and Kyrgyz alphabets; and Cyrillic numeral 7
- E (Cyrillic) or Э, fortieth letter of Kazakh, thirty-fifth letter of Dungan, thirty-third letter of Mongolian, thirty-first letter of Russian, thirtieth letter of Belarusian, twenty-eighth letter of Kyrgyz, and twenty-seventh letter of Uzbek alphabets
- Abkhazian Dze or Ӡ, nineteenth letter of Abkhazian Cyrillic script alphabet
- Ro (kana) or ろ, in hiragana Japanese script
- ع, Arabic ʿayn
- ③, one of the Enclosed Alphanumerics
- Da̰ dwé or ဒ, nineteenth letter of Burmese alphabet
- Vin or ვ, sixth letter of Georgian alphabet and Georgian numeral 6
- Kan or კ, eleventh letter of Georgian alphabet and Georgian numeral 20
- Par or პ, seventeenth letter of Georgian alphabet and Georgian numeral 80
- Vie or ჳ, obsolete twenty-second letter of Georgian alphabet
- Hi or Յ, twenty-first letter of Armenian alphabet and Armenian numeral 300
- ౩, Telugu alphabet numeral 3
- ૩, Gujarati alphabet numeral 3
- ३, Devanagari numeral 3
- ੩, Gurmukhī alphabet numeral 3
- ༣, Tibetan alphabet numeral 3
- Ꜣ, used to transcribe the Ancient Egyptian 'aleph' phoneme; see Transliteration of Ancient Egyptian

== See also ==
- 03 (disambiguation)
- 3%, a 2016 Brazilian dystopian thriller series
- 3% (group), an Australian rap group
- Big Three (disambiguation)
- Channel 3 (disambiguation)
- Class 3 (disambiguation)
- III (disambiguation)
- Lithium (atomic number), a chemical element
- Model 3 (disambiguation)
- Number Three (disambiguation)
- Third (disambiguation)
- The Three (disambiguation)
- Three Percenters, a far-right American paramilitary group advocating gun rights and resisting government
- Three's Company, 1970s British TV series
- Type III (disambiguation)
