= 03 =

03 may refer to:

== Common meanings ==
- The year 2003, or any year ending with 03
- The month of March
- 3 (number)

== Music ==
- 03 (album), by Urban Zakapa, 2013
- 03, a 2007 album by Twelve

== Telephone codes ==
- 03 numbers, a non-geographic telephone number range in the UK
- The telephone area code for the South Island of New Zealand

== Other uses ==
- Allier, a French department
- U.S. Marine Corps Infantry (occupational field designator 03)
- Tokyo Metro 03 series
- iCar 03, an electric compact crossover SUV
- Lynk & Co 03, a compact executive sedan

== See also ==
- O3 (disambiguation)
- 3 (disambiguation)
