= Chery Arrizo 3 =

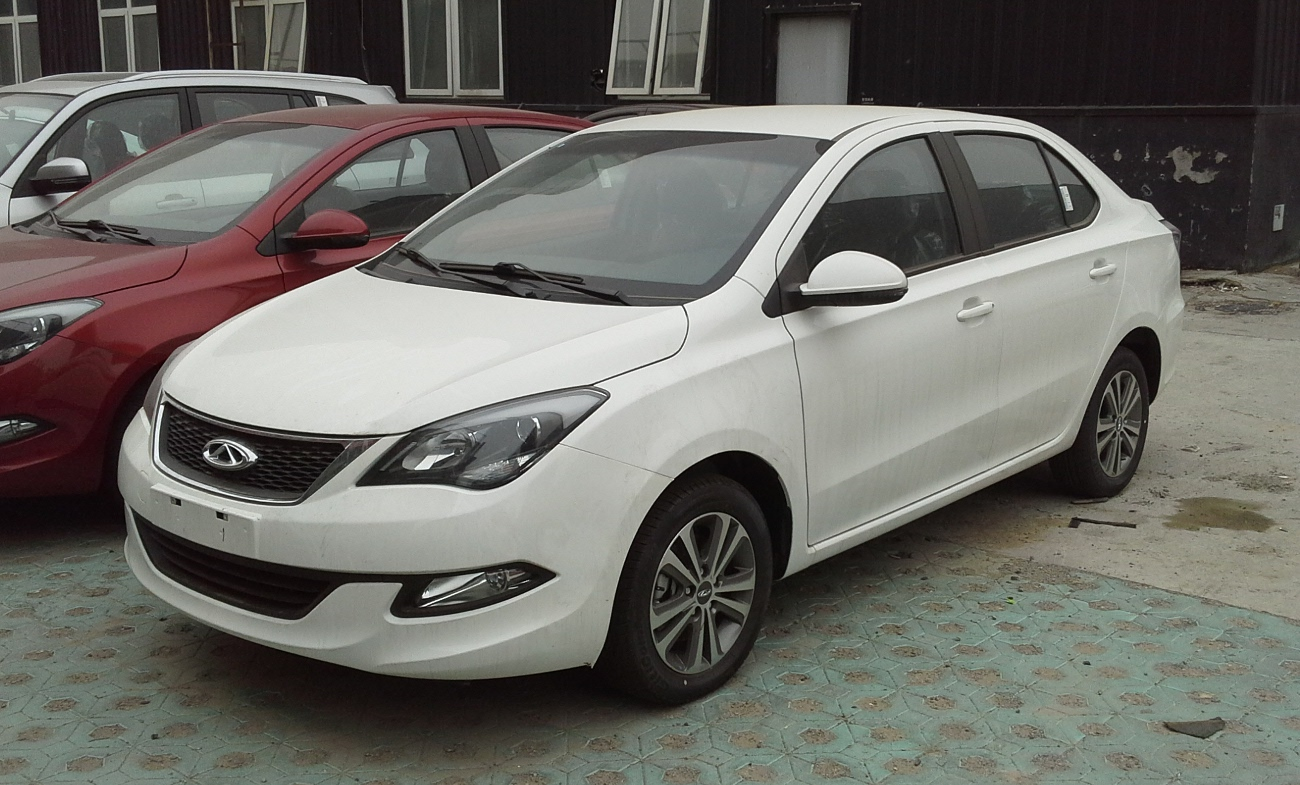

Overview
- Manufacturer: Chery
- Production: 2014–2020
- Assembly: Wuhu, Anhui, China

Body and chassis
- Class: Subcompact car (B)
- Body style: 4-door sedan
- Layout: FF layout

Powertrain
- Engine: 1.5 L SQRD4G15 I4 (petrol); 1.5 L SQRD4G15C I4 (petrol)
- Transmission: 5-speed manual 4 speed automatic

Dimensions
- Wheelbase: 2,572 mm (101.3 in)
- Length: 4,458 mm (175.5 in)
- Width: 1,755 mm (69.1 in)
- Height: 1,493 mm (58.8 in)

Chronology
- Predecessor: Chery E3

The Chery Arrizo 3 is a subcompact sedan produced by Chery.

== Overview ==
The Chery Arrizo 3 is essentially a facelifted Chery E3, and was teased by the Chery Arrizo Newbee concept car at the 2014 Guangzhou Auto Show, and debuted by the end of 2014. The power of the Arrizo 3 comes from a 1.5 liter four-cylinder engine producing 122 hp, mated to a 5-speed manual transmission or a CVT. The Arrizo 3 was set to replace the Chery Fulwin 2 and placed under the Arrizo 5 compact sedan with the pricing ranging from around 60,000 yuan to 80,000 yuan.

== Gallery ==
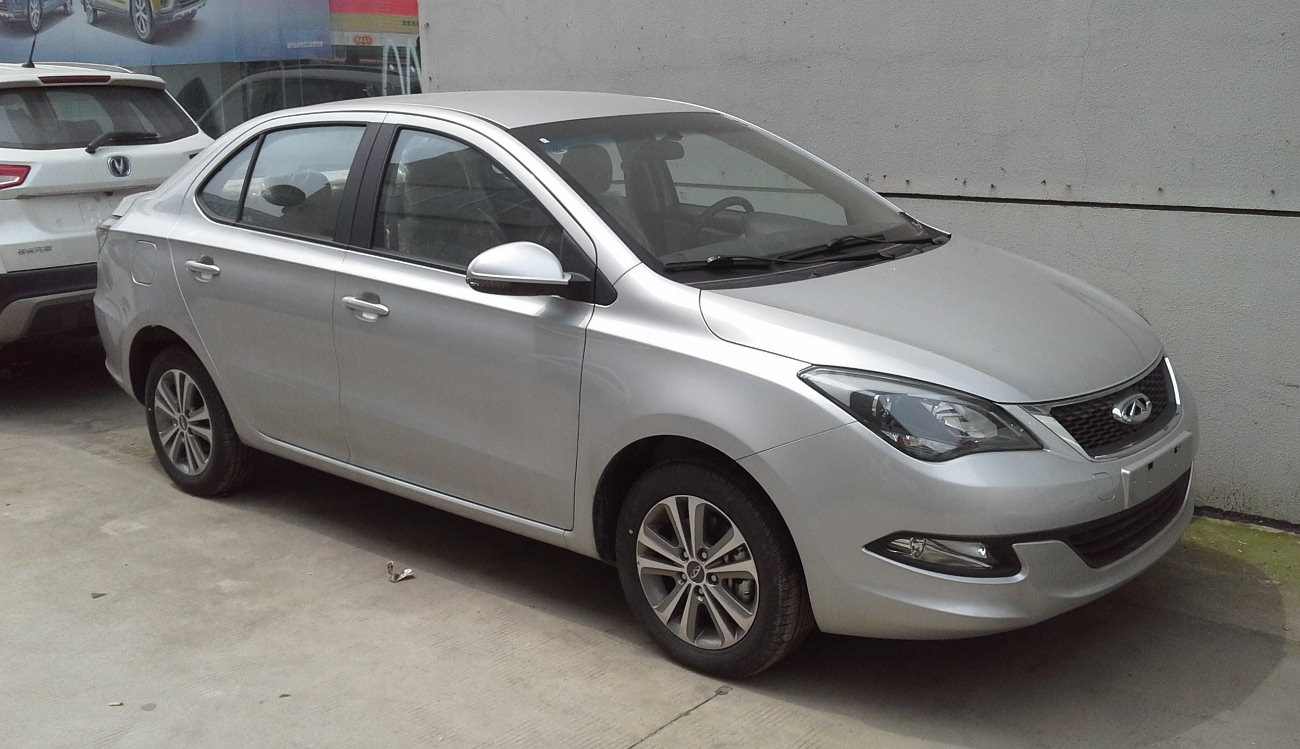
Chery Arrizo 3 front

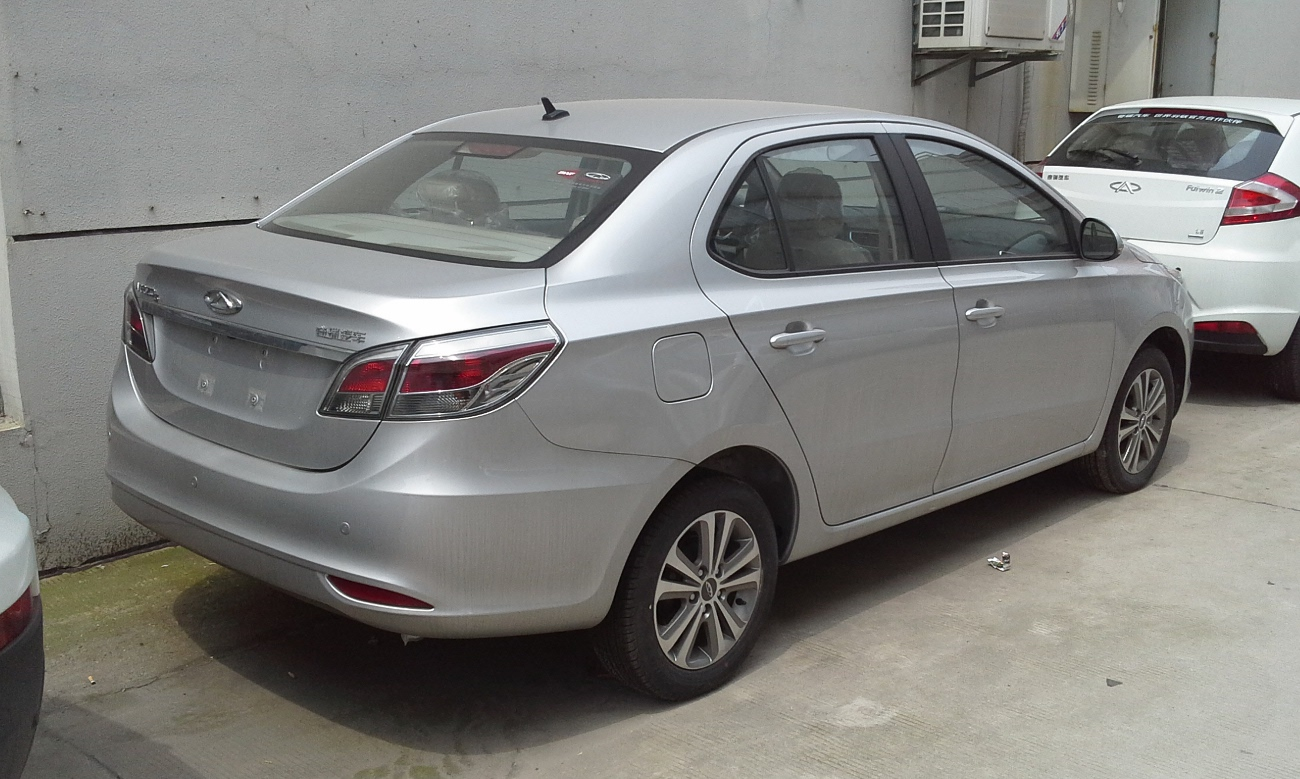
Chery Arrizo 3 rear

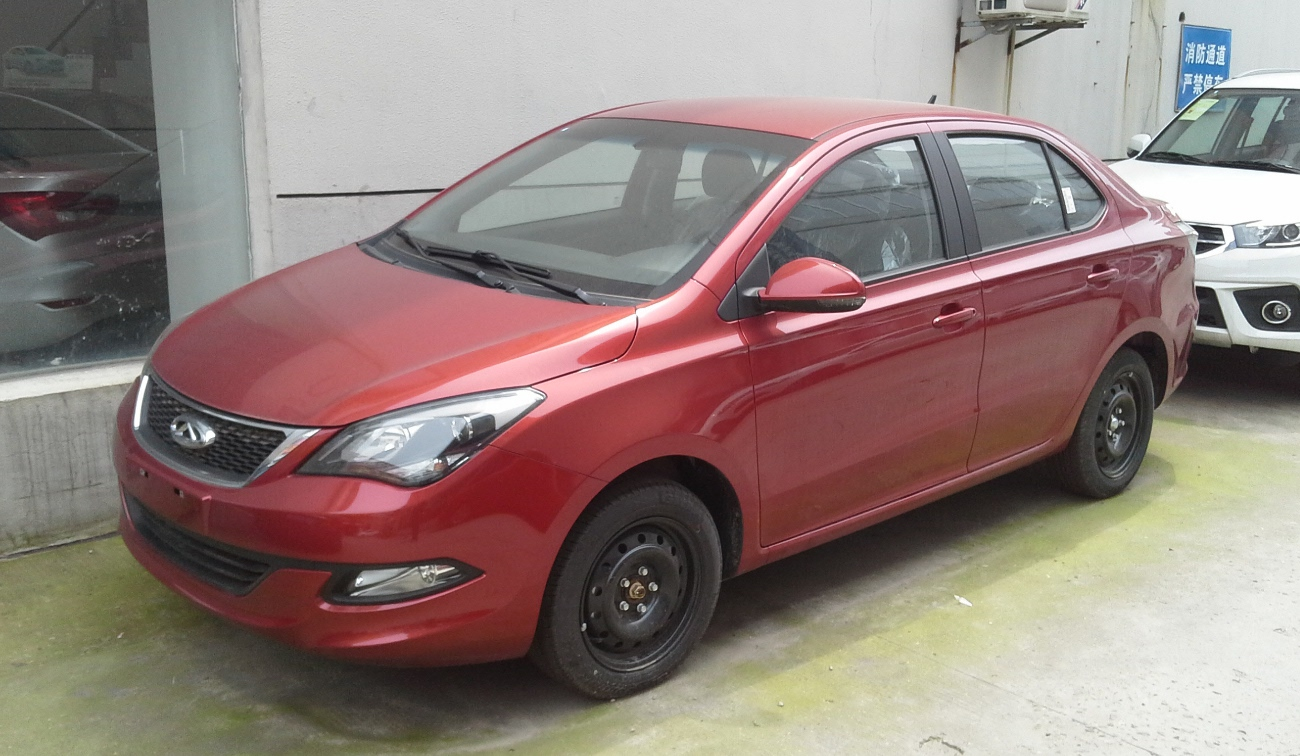
A base trim Chery Arrizo 3 front
