= 3O =

3O or 3-O may refer to:

- 3J, IATA code for Jubba Airways
- 3O, IATA code for Air Arabia Maroc
- 3o Sector, see Tertiary sector of the economy
- 3-O-sulfation, a phenomenon occurring in Heparan sulfate

== See also ==
- O3 (disambiguation)
- 30
