= Chery E3 =

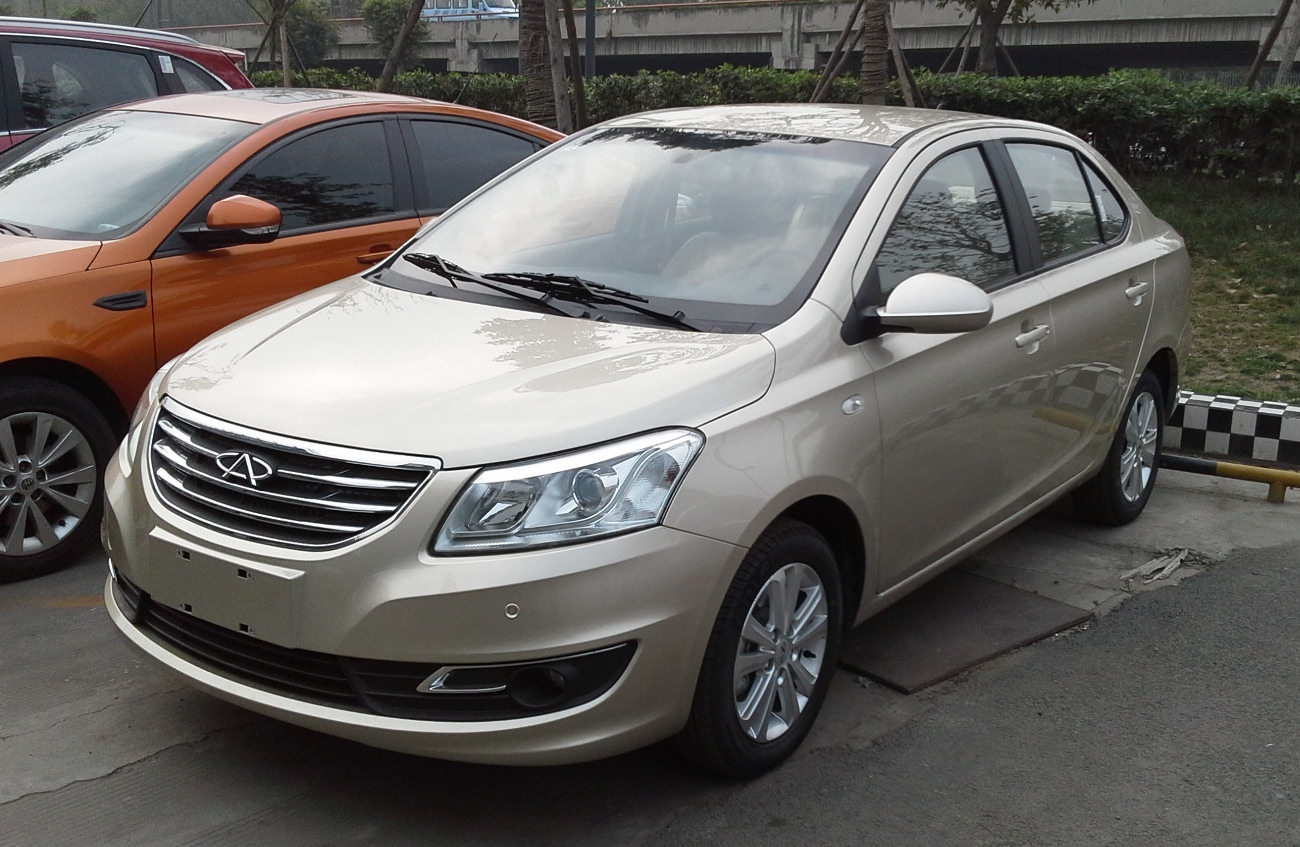

Overview
- Manufacturer: Chery
- Also called: Cowin E3
- Production: 2013–2015
- Assembly: Wuhu, Anhui, China

Body and chassis
- Class: Subcompact car (B)
- Body style: 4-door sedan
- Layout: FF layout
- Related: Chery Arrizo 3

Powertrain
- Engine: 1.5 L SQRD4G15 I4 (petrol)
- Transmission: 5-speed manual

Dimensions
- Wheelbase: 2,570 mm (101.2 in)
- Length: 4,450 mm (175.2 in)
- Width: 1,748 mm (68.8 in)
- Height: 1,493 mm (58.8 in)

Chronology
- Predecessor: Chery A13
- Successor: Chery Arrizo 3

The Chery E3 (codeproject A19) is a Subcompact sedan produced by Chery before the major facelift and name change to Arrizo 3.

== Overview ==
The Chery E3 was launched on the China car market on September 12, 2013. Prices ranges from 56,800 yuan to 69,800 yuan.

The Chery E3 was codenamed A19 when under development, and is slotted below Chery E5 and Cowin 3 for the Chery brand and Cowin brand respectively.

The power of the Chery E3 comes from a 1.5 liter Acteco engine developing 109 hp (80 kW) and 140 nm, mated to a five-speed manual transmission. Front suspensions are MacPherson struts and the rear ones are Torsion beams.

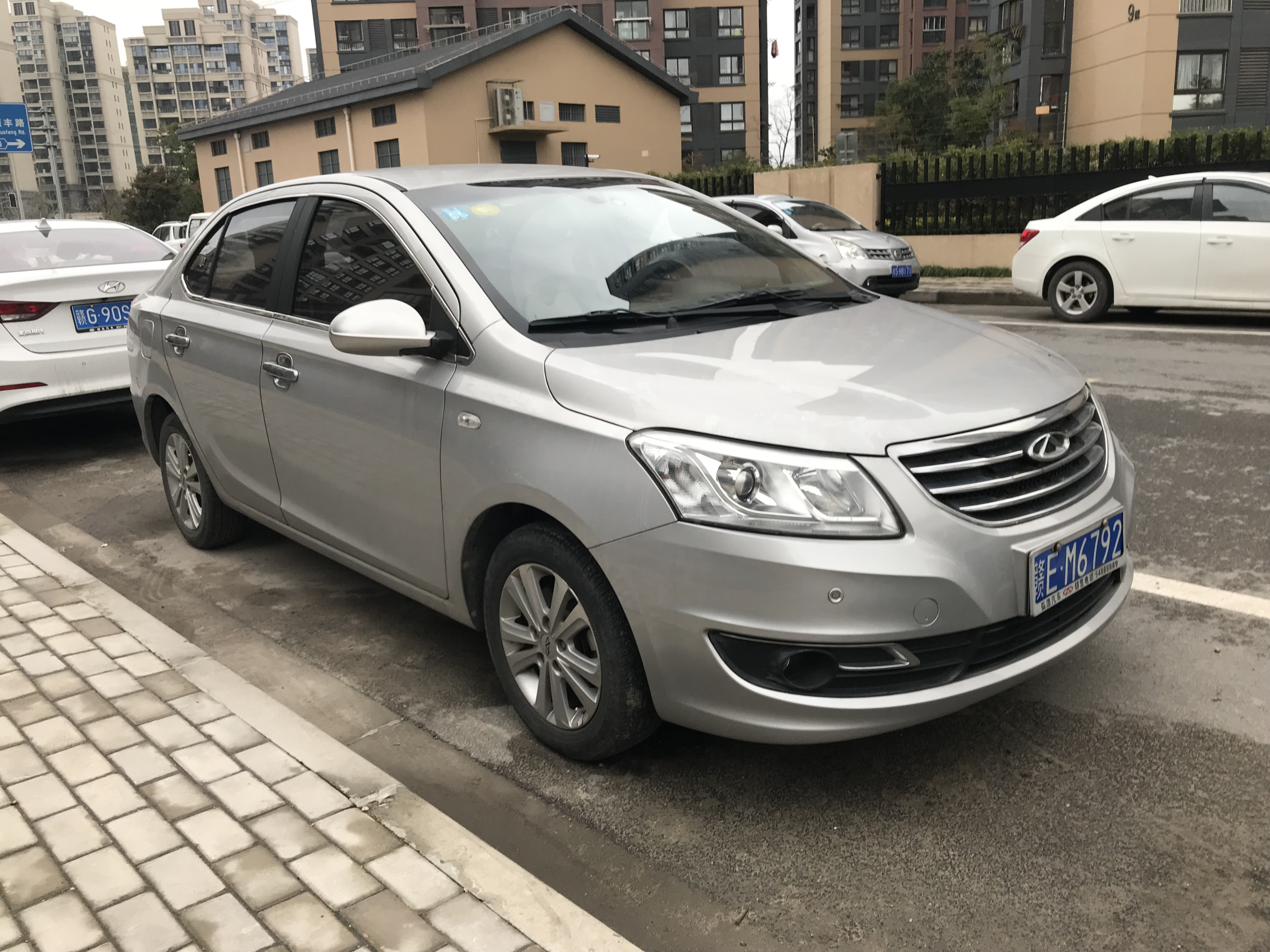
Chery E3 front

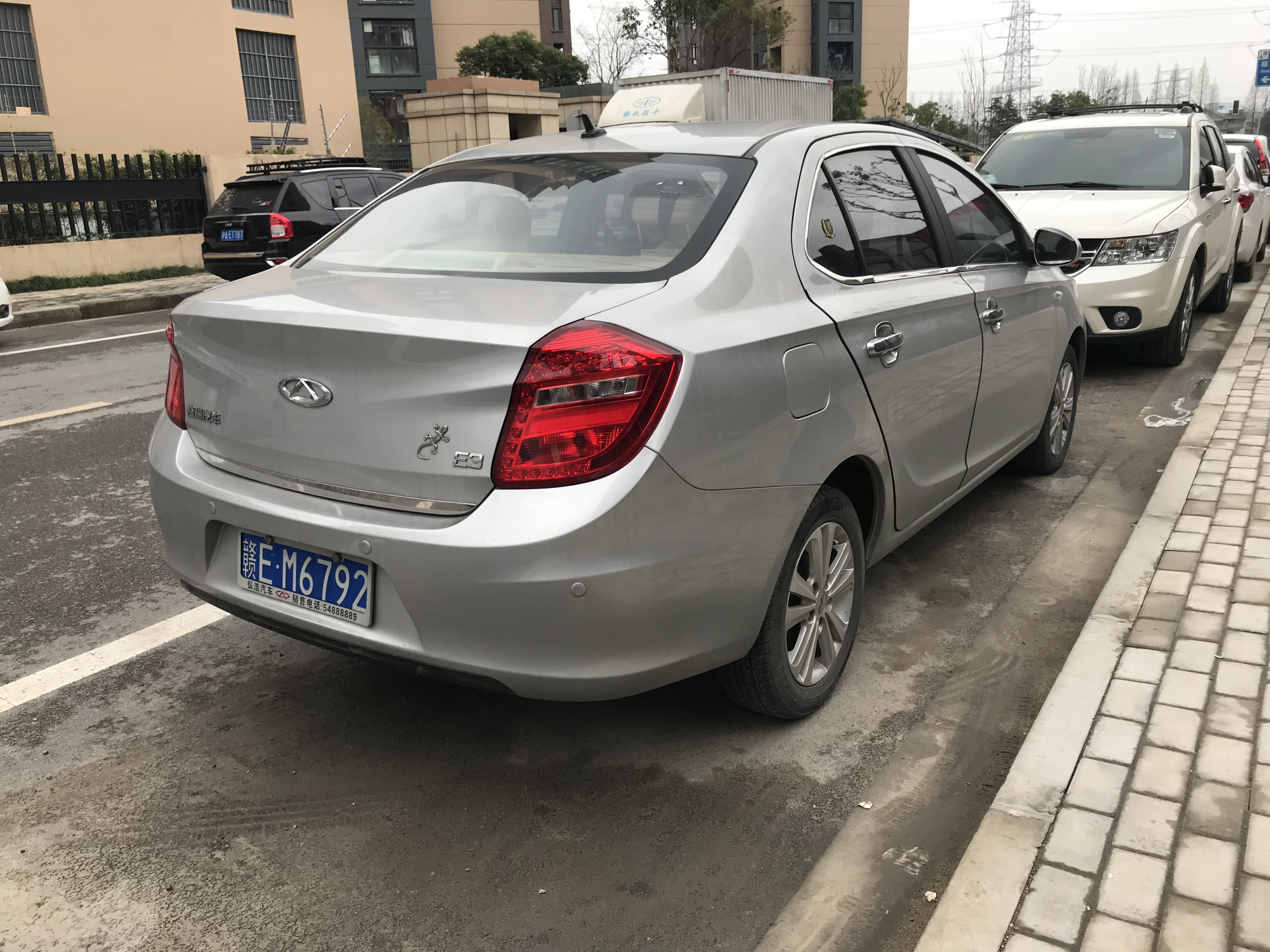
Chery E3 rear

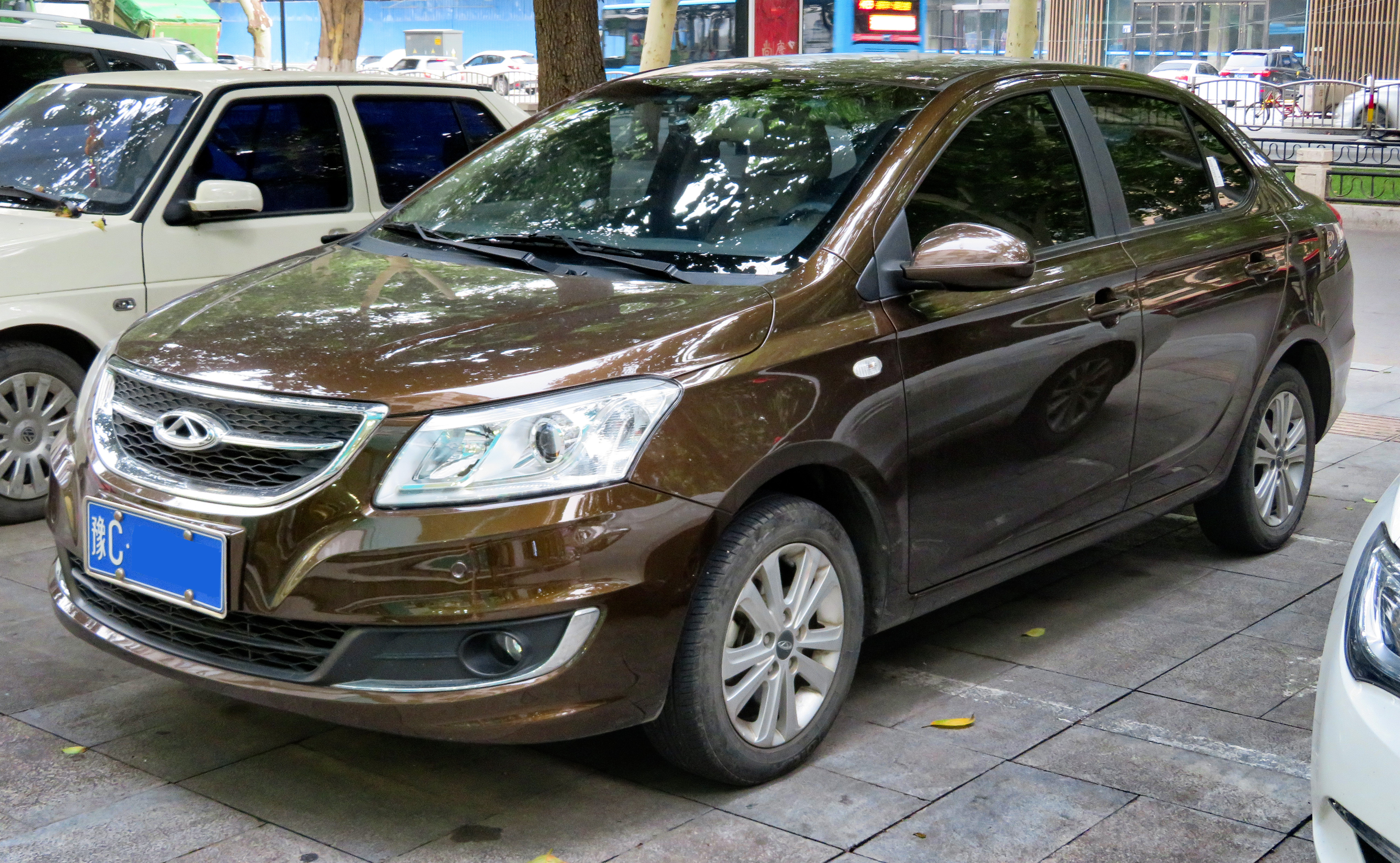
Chery E3 facelift front
