= O3 =

O3 may refer to:

== Science and technology ==
- Ozone (O_{3}), an allotrope of oxygen
- O^{3−}, the ozonide anion
- O(3), the 3-dimensional orthogonal group in group theory
- O3 star, a subclass of the O-type star stellar classification
- Haplogroup O3 (Y-DNA), a Y-DNA Haplogroup
- OpenAI o3, an artificial intelligence model

== Music ==
- O_{3} (album), by Sunscreem, 1993
- O3, a 2008 album by Son of Dave
- O3 Trilogy, a series of albums by Dominici

== Military ==
- O-3, a uniformed services pay grade of the United States for the following:
  - Captain (United States O-3), in the Army, Marine Corps, Air Force, and Space Force
  - Lieutenant (navy), in the Navy, Coast Guard, Public Health Service Commissioned Corps, and NOAA Commissioned Officer Corps
- USS O-3 (SS-64), a 1917 United States O class submarine

== Transportation ==
- Oldershaw O-3, a glider
- Otoyol 3, a Turkish motorway from Edirne to Istanbul
- LNER Class O3, a class of British steam locomotives

== Other uses ==
- Oskarshamn 3, unit 3 at Oskarshamn Nuclear Power Plant in Sweden

== See also ==
- 03 (disambiguation)
- Ö3, Austrian radio station
- 3O (disambiguation)
