= The Three =

The Three may refer to:

- The Three, an elite group among David's Mighty Warriors, as described in the Hebrew Bible
- The Three, a group of Greek translations of the Hebrew Bible by three translators: Aquila of Sinope, Theodotion and Symmachus
- The Three (film)
- The Three, a group of warrior vampires in Angel (Buffy the Vampire Slayer episode)#The Three

== See also ==
- 3 (disambiguation)
