= Threes Above High =

Dive bar in Columbus, Ohio

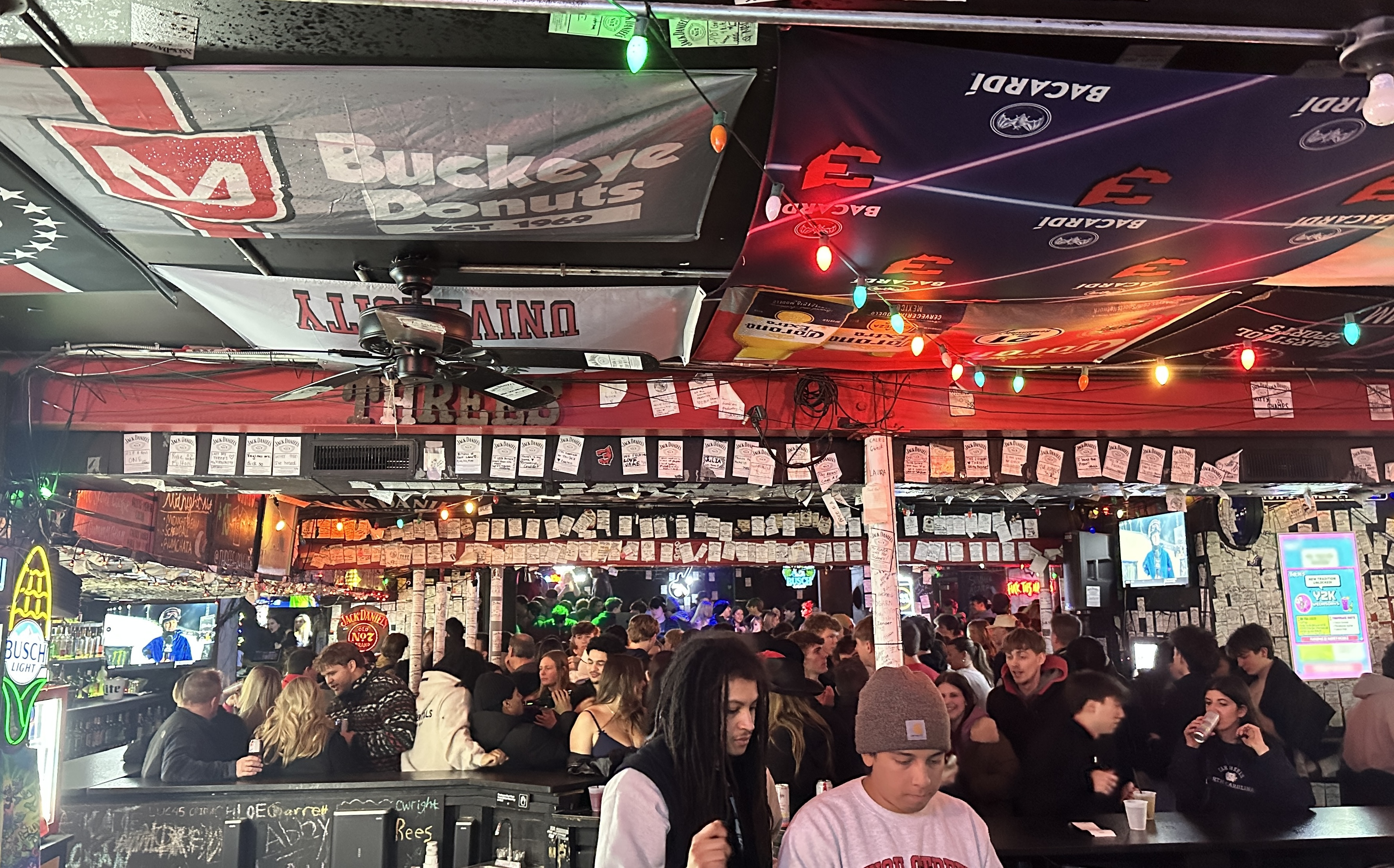
- Threes in 2026

General information
- Location: 2208 North High Street; Columbus, Ohio, United States
- Opened: 2017

Technical details
- Floor count: 1

Other information
- Number of bars: 2
- Public transit: 2, 31

Website
- https://threesabovehigh.com

Threes Above High (Note: The bar occasionally spells its name as Thr3es) is a dive bar located in Columbus, Ohio, just north of the main campus of Ohio State University. The bar first opened in 2017 by Scott Ellsworth, who leads an ownership team consisting of four other individuals. Ellsworth opened Threes as a successor to a former dive bar Too's Spirits Under High when its building was replaced by developers; Threes itself was succeeded by more "number bars" in Fours on High and Fives Up High, which opened in 2019 and 2022 respectively.

== History ==
Threes Above High was founded when an older bar Ellsworth purchased, Too's Spirits Under High, was scheduled to be demolished as part of redevelopment near Ohio State's campus. On Too's last day of business in December 2017, the bar opened at 5am, with its line stretching all the way to 15th Avenue and High Street. Ellsworth credited a movement known as "Save Too's" for supporting the continued existence of Too's, and Ellsworth would eventually purchase a local venue, the Scarlet & Grey cafe concert venue and bar, to be used for Threes.

During the COVID-19 pandemic, the state of Ohio developed a reopening plan which prioritized bars last, which would not be able to earn revenue over the pandemic since Threes and other establishment lacked a kitchen for takeout. Ellsworth protested these concerns to local media, and in preparation for immediate school year afterward, Ellsworth would not be able to hire the previous pre-COVID max of seven bartenders and seven door people simultaneously. Threes was also behind a local fundraiser to donate to bar employees affected by the pandemic, which ended up raising over $43,000. In January 2021, Threes launched a petition for the state of Ohio to extend the bar curfew for OSU's national championship game, which during the pandemic was set from 10PM to 5AM. Threes and Fours previously joined a lawsuit against the City of Columbus and Mayor Andrew Ginther against the same proposed curfew in July 2020, which succeeded that same month. Despite the suit, Ohio governor Mike DeWine reimposed the 10PM curfew as a cutoff on alcohol sales instead of an order to close through an executive order, though the City repealed its own curfew in October; Ellsworth commented to local news outlets criticizing the "very confusing" situation.

As of the opening of sister bar Fives Up High, the "number bars" are owned by a team of five individuals, including Ellsworth. Such individuals are Cory Harmon, Aaron Thompson, Sam McNaughton, and musician Jon White.

== Drink offerings ==
Threes' most widely known offering is the "tidal wave", a shot which started at Too's and involved the customer drinking the shot followed by staff throwing a glass of water in the customer's face. Originally a shot of Jägermeister at Too's, the shot is now a blue raspberry flavored vodka, and sells for $6. Threes requires that customers ordering a tidal wave for someone else must stand next to the person they ordered it for and also order a tidal wave for themselves.

Threes occasionally runs a happy hour where all drinks are $1 for the first 30 minutes of business, before increasing to $2 for the next hour, and $3 thereafter. The bar names this happy hour a "pyramid scheme", named after the illegal and unsustainable business model.

== Accolades and reception ==
Threes has a widely positive reception in the Ohio State community. Students speaking to local media have called the bar a cultural institution and praised the bar for its "homey" atmosphere.

In 2025, USA Today named Threes Above High as one of its 29 best bars in the United States. The following year in February, Threes was entered into a national bracket competition for the best college bar in the country with a prize of a $5,000 bar tab, with the bar making it into the "Sweet 16" round.

Threes received coverage in 2026 after local magazine 614NOW reported that Threes was named by the Instagram account College Unverified as the third best in a list of 250 bars and nightclubs in the United States. Threes responded on Instagram with their own post, saying "We’ve never had to pay for the love, and we’ve never had to game the system to earn it. But we’ll gladly accept the love…and the free publicity".

== Sister locations ==
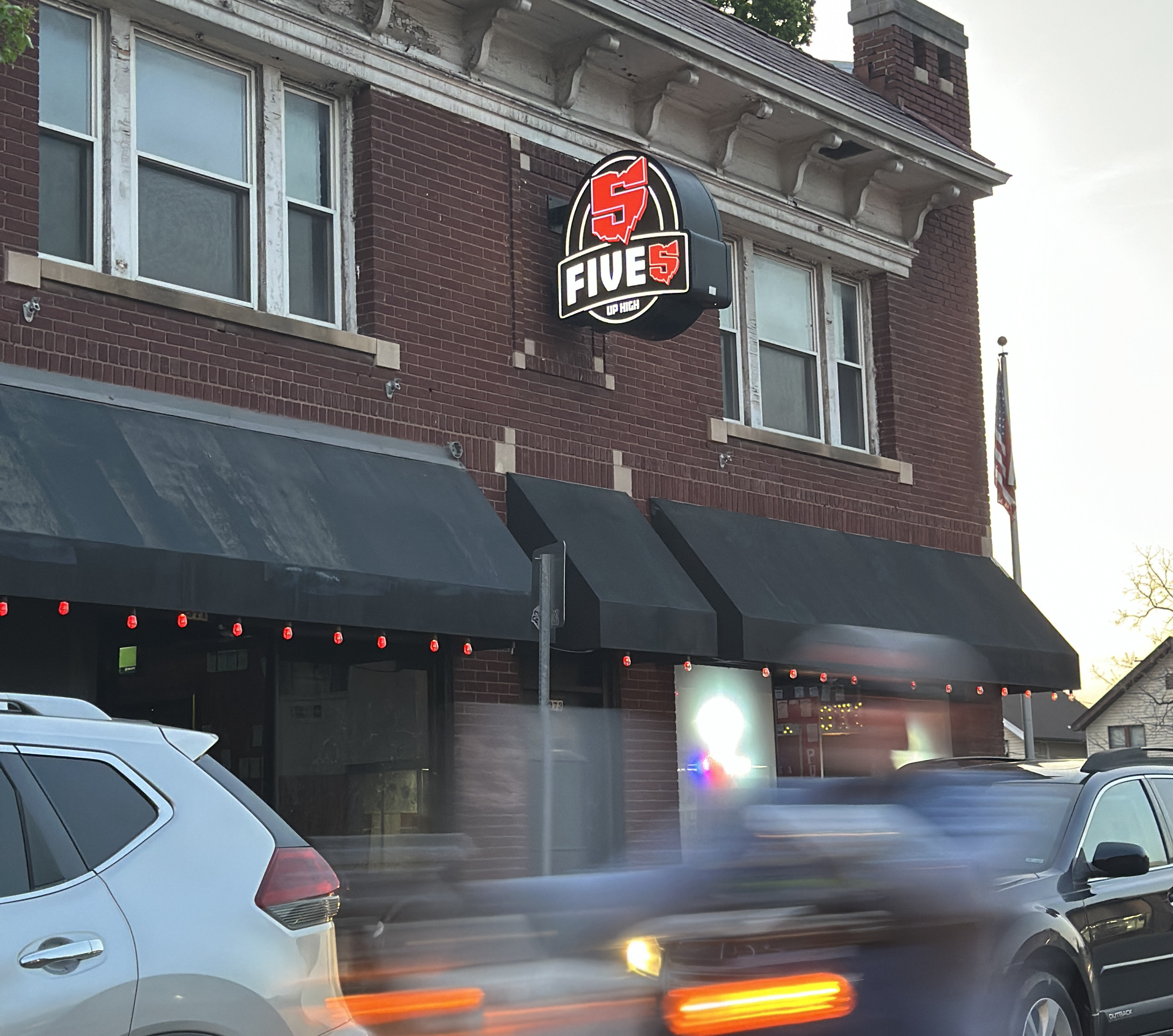
Sister bar Fives Up High, in Old North Columbus

In 2019, Ellsworth opened Fours on High in the Short North, replacing the old whiskey bar Barrel on High. In place of Barrel's more intimate setup, Fours built an environment which prioritizes openness, adding both a second bar and a stage to the property. Fours, like Threes, is a dive bar, though at opening it did serve food, mostly handheld dishes such as Thai style Brussel sprouts, egg rolls, corn dogs and paninis. Fours temporarily closed due to the COVID-19 pandemic, though would eventually reopen.

Ellsworth opened a successor to both Threes and Fours in Old North Columbus, named Fives Up High, in January 2022. Joking that the bar would be "420 steps up the street from Thr3es", Fives opened with similar concept and layout to that of Fours. Like Fours, Fives would open in the space of a former bar, this time replacing Hendoc's Pub. Fives would announce that it would close in May 2026, after Ohio State's senior bar crawl, in order to transfer its liquor license to the upcoming Two's Under High.

On November 26, 2025, Ellsworth announced that Too's Spirit Under High, now renamed to Two's Under High, would be returning in 2026, reviving the bar after nearly a decade of being closed. The bar would be opened on High Street, in the basement of a location of the Columbus local hot dog chain Dirty Frank's.
