= Three of Them =

1901 novel by Maksim Gorky

Three of Them (Russian Трое "Three") is a 1901 novel by Maksim Gorky. The plot concerns Ilya Lunyev, a boy from an urban slum, who enters the middle-class milieu only to be disillusioned to find the same moral corruption.
