= Chery Fulwin 2 =

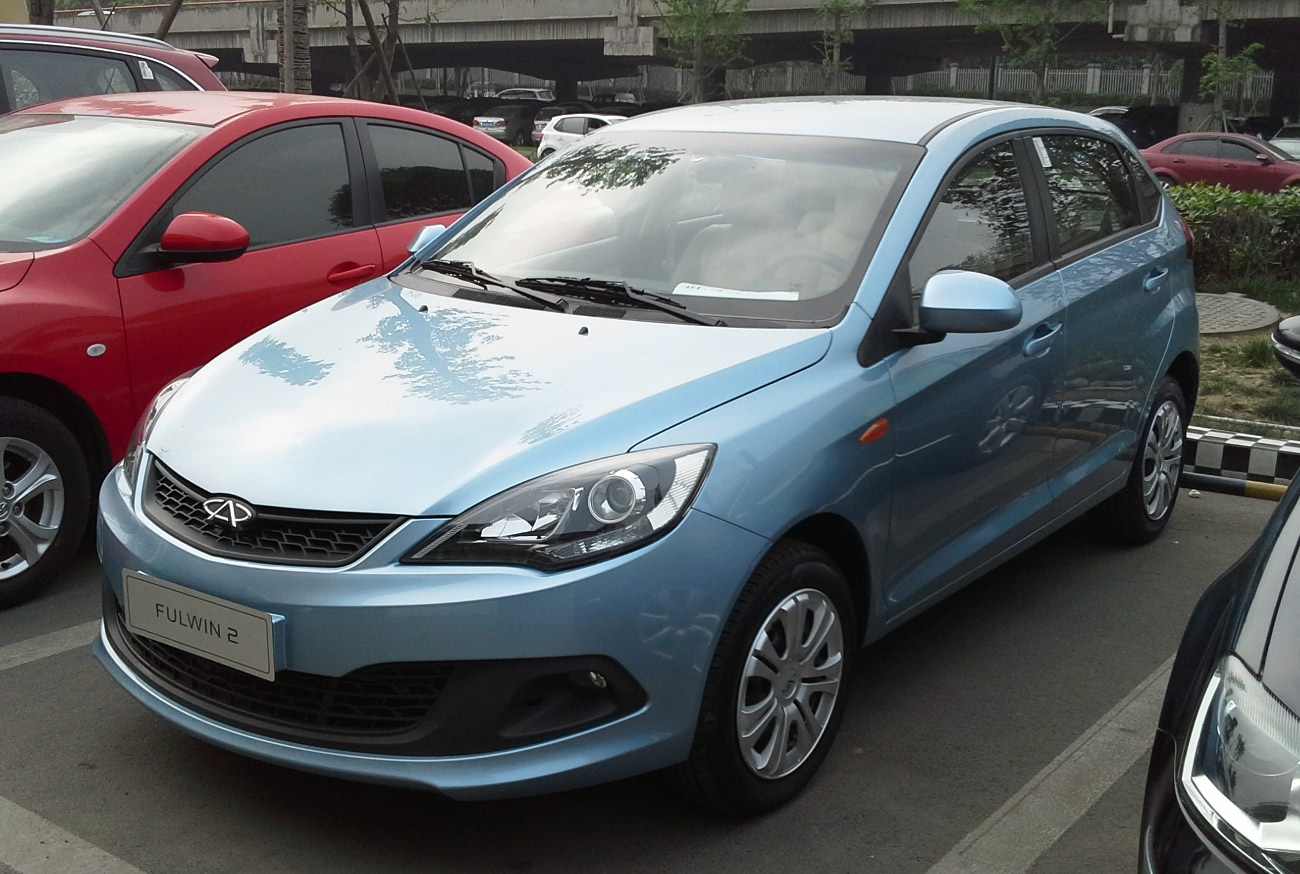

Overview
- Manufacturer: Chery
- Also called: Chery A13; Chery Storm 2 Chery Bonus (sedan, Russia); Chery Very (hatchback, Russia); Chery Celer (Brazil); Chery Cristal (Indonesia); ZAZ Forza (Ukraine); ZAZ Slavuta Nova (Ukraine, cancelled); MVM 315/315 Plus (Iran)
- Production: 2009–2019
- Assembly: Wuhu, Anhui, China; Zaporizhia, Ukraine (ZAZ); Kerman, Iran (MVM); Jacareí, Brazil
- Designer: Torino Design

Body and chassis
- Class: Subcompact (B)
- Body style: 4-door sedan 5-door hatchback
- Layout: FF layout
- Related: Chery Tiggo 3x

Powertrain
- Engine: 1.5 L SQR477F I4 (petrol)
- Transmission: 5-speed manual/automatic

Dimensions
- Wheelbase: 2,527 mm (99.5 in)
- Length: 4,269 mm (168.1 in) (sedan, 2009–); 4,139 mm (163.0 in) (hatchback, 2009–); 4,333 mm (170.6 in) (sedan, 2012–); 4,188 mm (164.9 in) (hatchback, 2012–)
- Width: 1,686 mm (66.4 in)
- Height: 1,492 mm (58.7 in)
- Curb weight: 1,200–1,275 kg (2,646–2,811 lb)

Chronology
- Predecessor: Chery A15
- Successor: Chery E3

The Chery A13, also known as Fulwin 2, is a subcompact car manufactured by the Chinese automaker Chery. It is the successor of the A15 (Cowin) in the Chery lineup. The car was presented for the first time at the 2008 Beijing Auto Show. A facelifted version was introduced at the 2012 Guangzhou Motor Show.

Its rivals include the FAW Oley, JAC J3, Honda Amaze, Nissan March, Toyota Etios and Suzuki Swift.

== Production ==
It is also manufactured in Ukraine, since 2011, by the local company AvtoZAZ with the name of ZAZ Forza. A total of 4,138 units were produced in 2011, 2,853 units in 2012, and 1,447 units in 2013. Cars assembled in Ukraine are sold in Russia, as Chery Very (hatchback) and Chery Bonus (liftback).

In 2016 in Kyiv ZAZ unveiled the facelifted model that was planned to be called ZAZ Slavuta Nova after one of the brands previous cars.

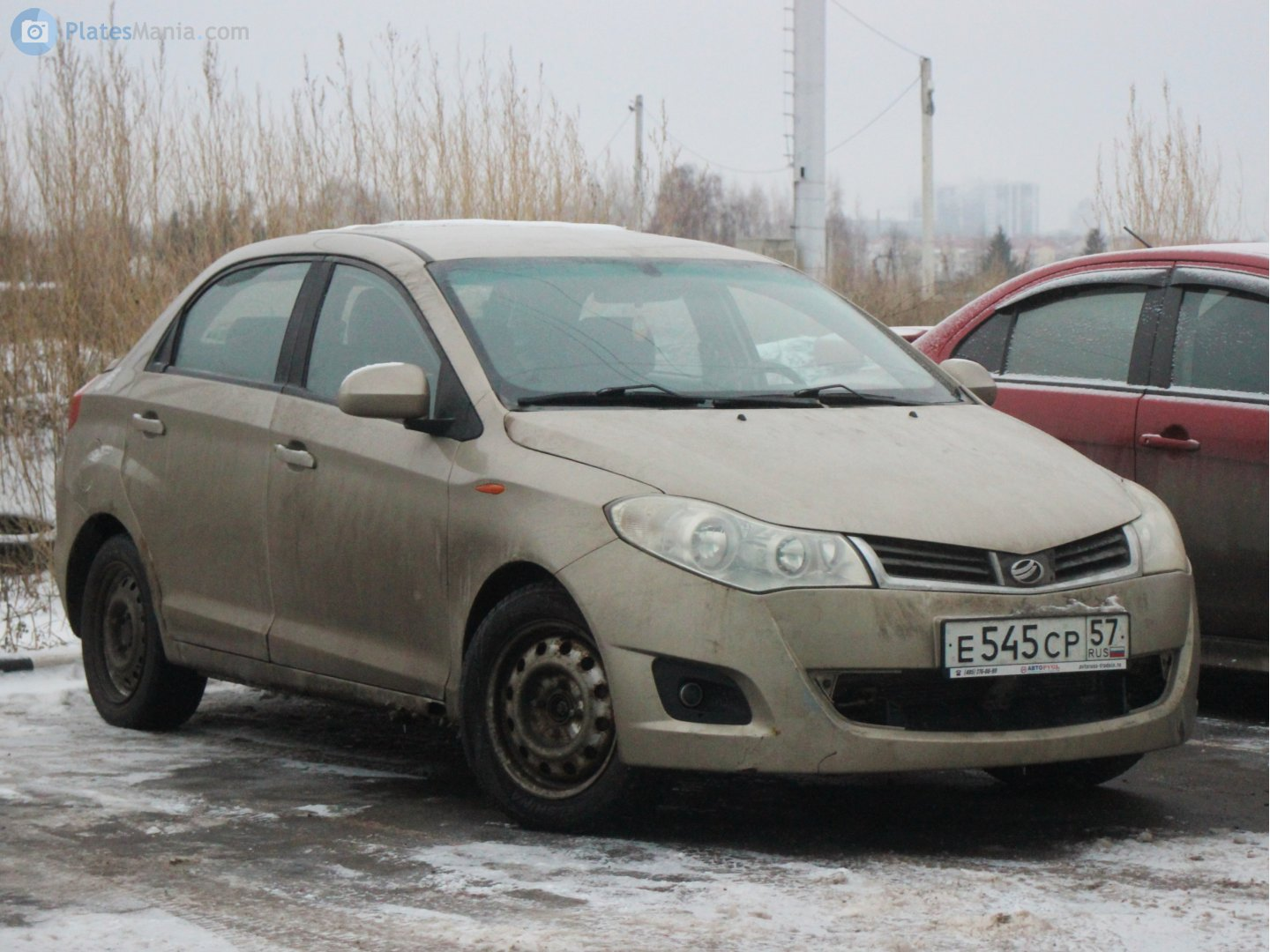
ZAZ Forza sedan

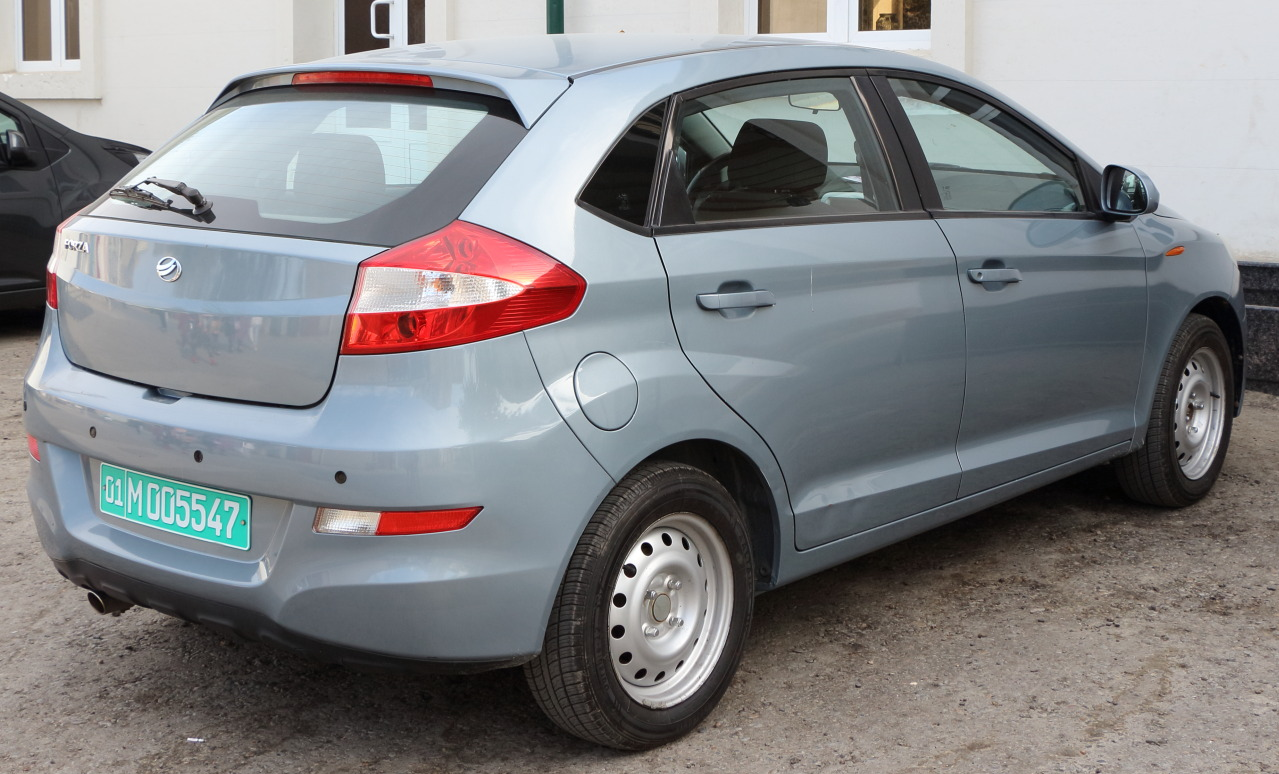
ZAZ Forza hatchback

== Engine ==
It is powered by a 1.5-litre 16-valve petrol engine of the Chery Acteco family, with a maximum power output of 80 kW (109 PS; 107 bhp) at 6,000 rpm and a maximum torque of 140 N⋅m (103 lb⋅ft) at 3,000 rpm. The top speed is 160 km/h (99 mph).

== Gallery ==
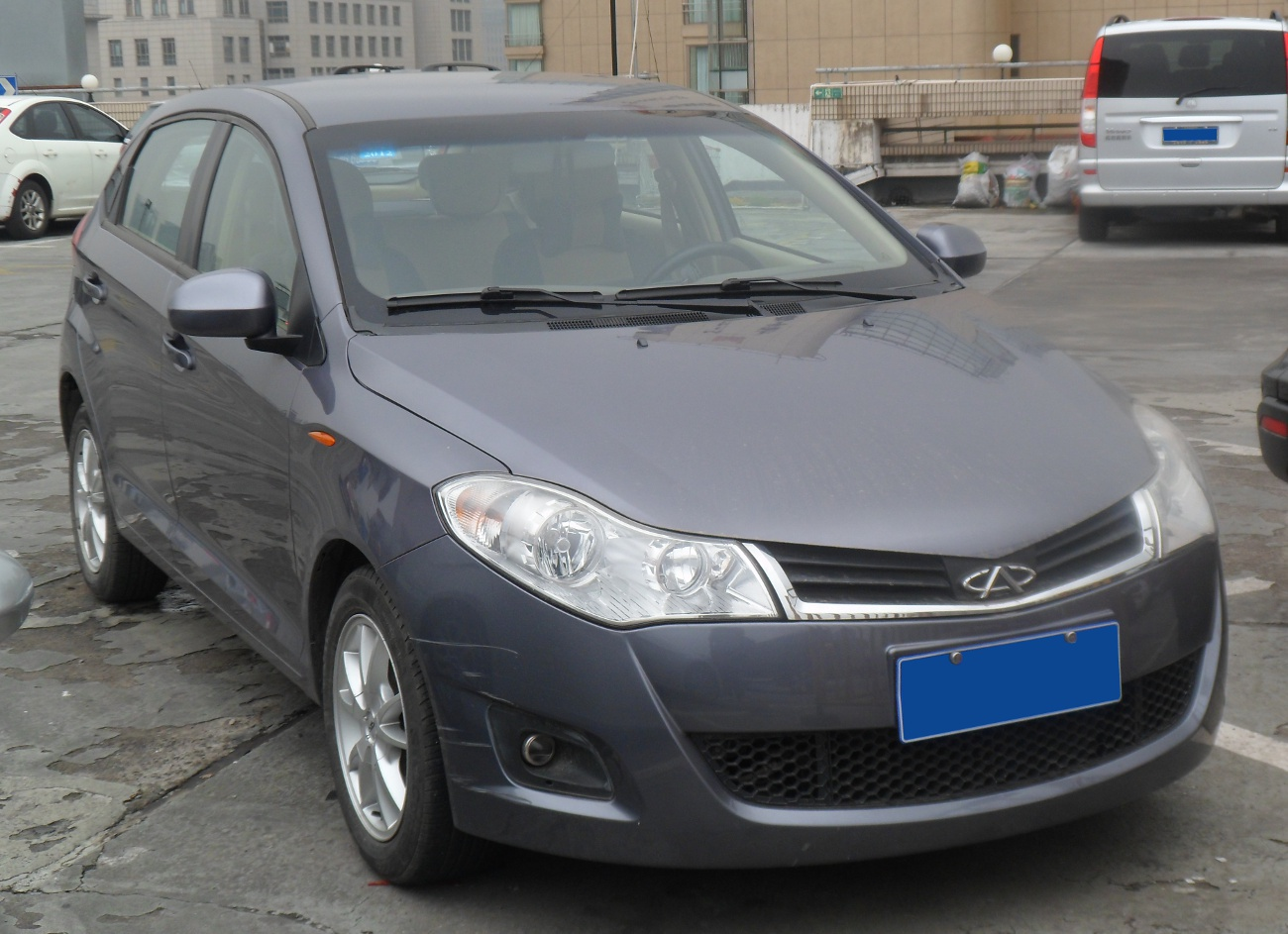
Chery Fulwin 2 hatchback

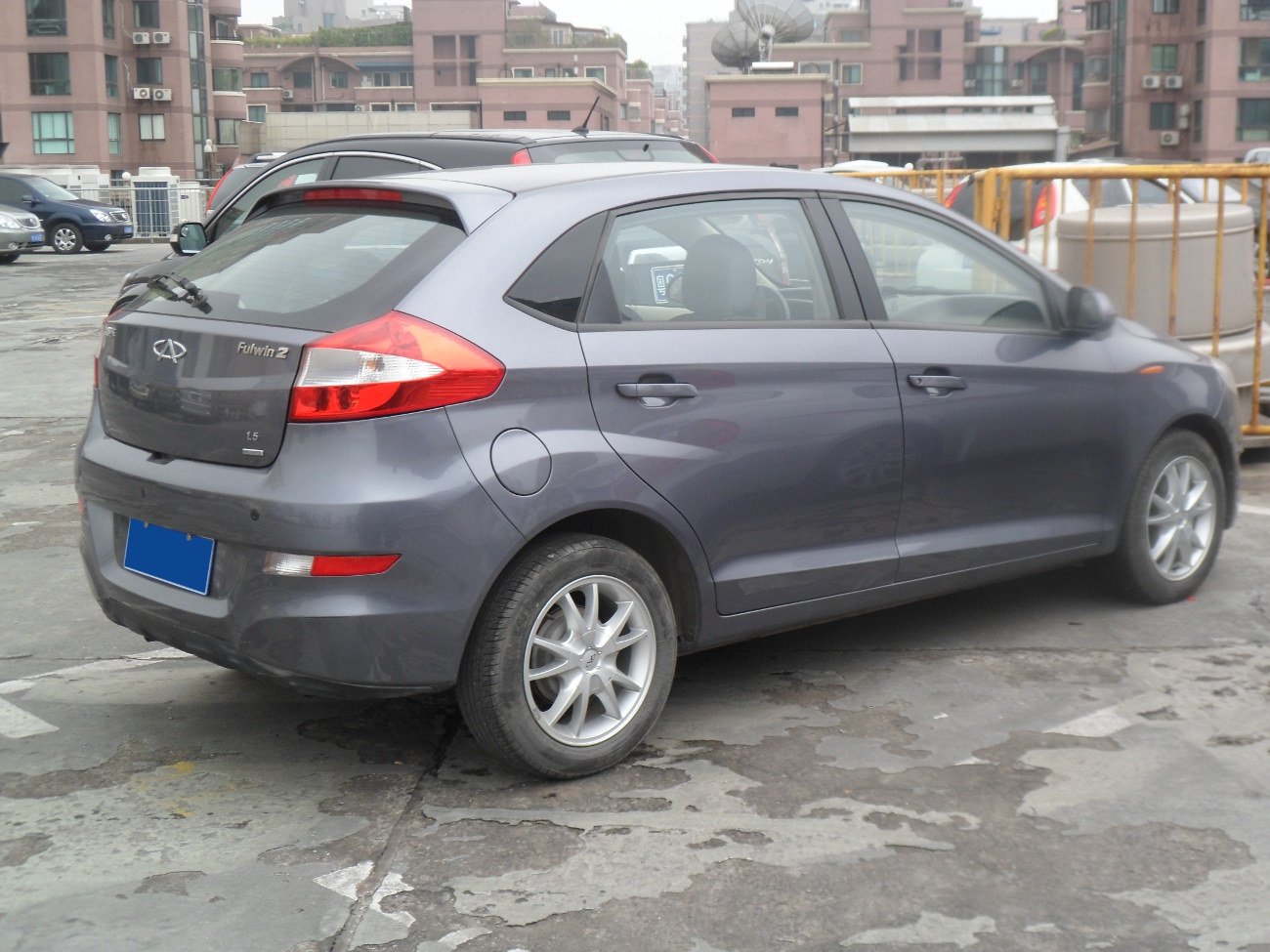
Chery Fulwin 2 hatchback

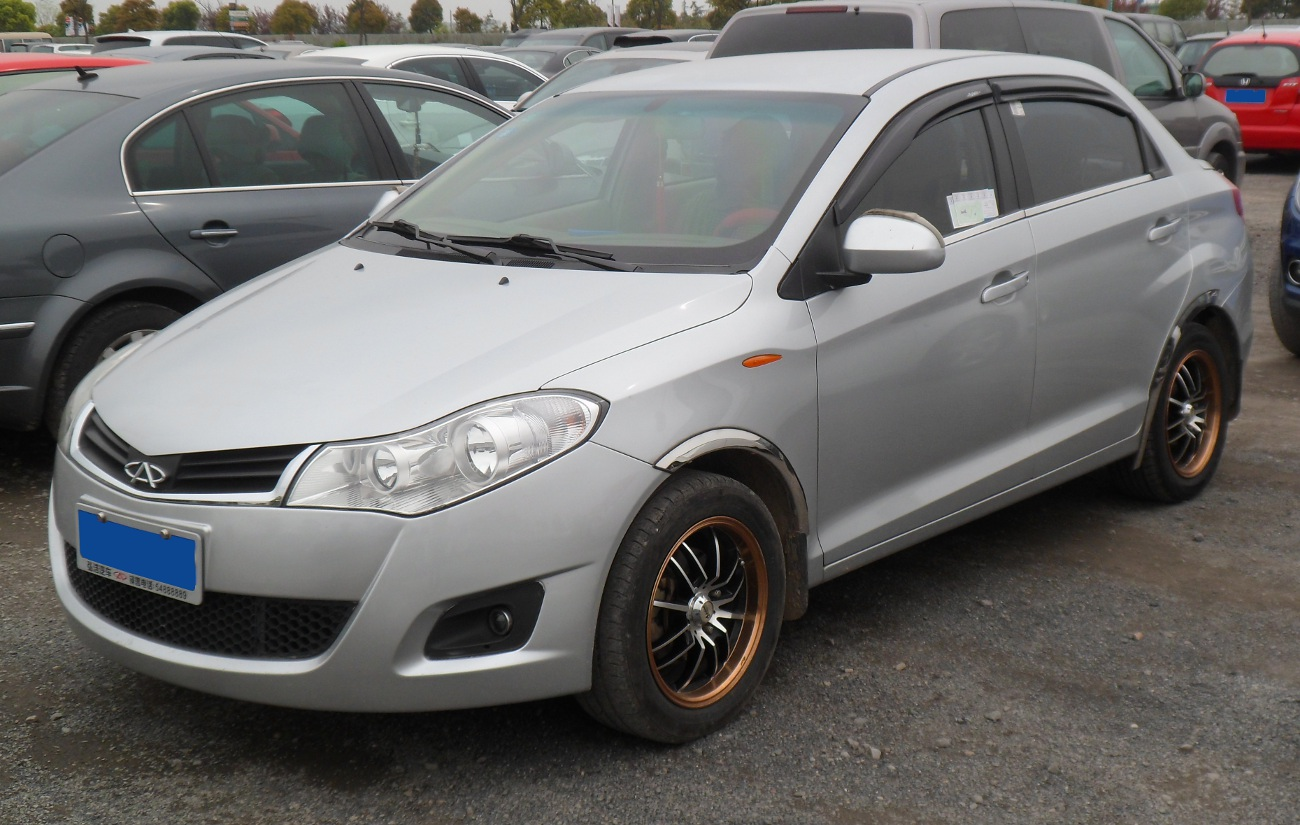
Chery Fulwin 2 sedan

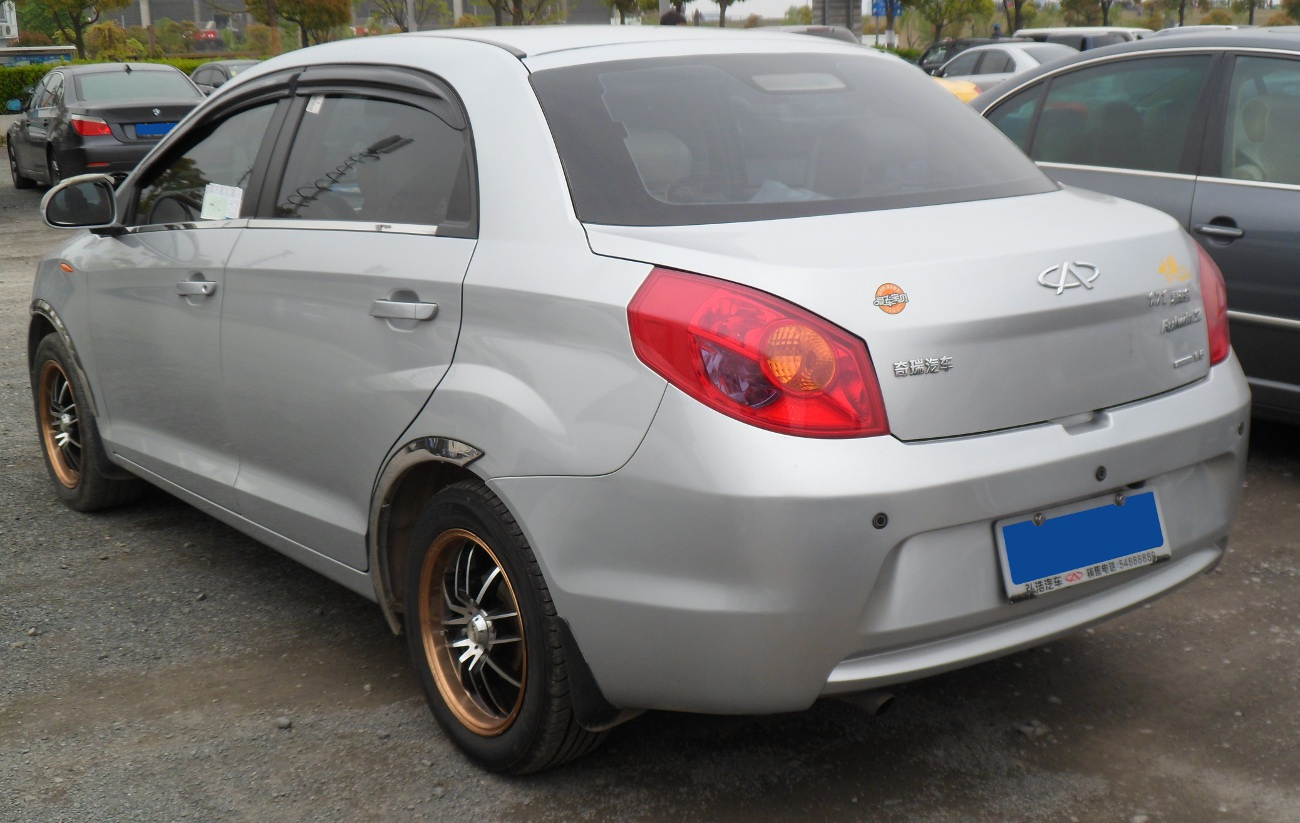
Chery Fulwin 2 sedan

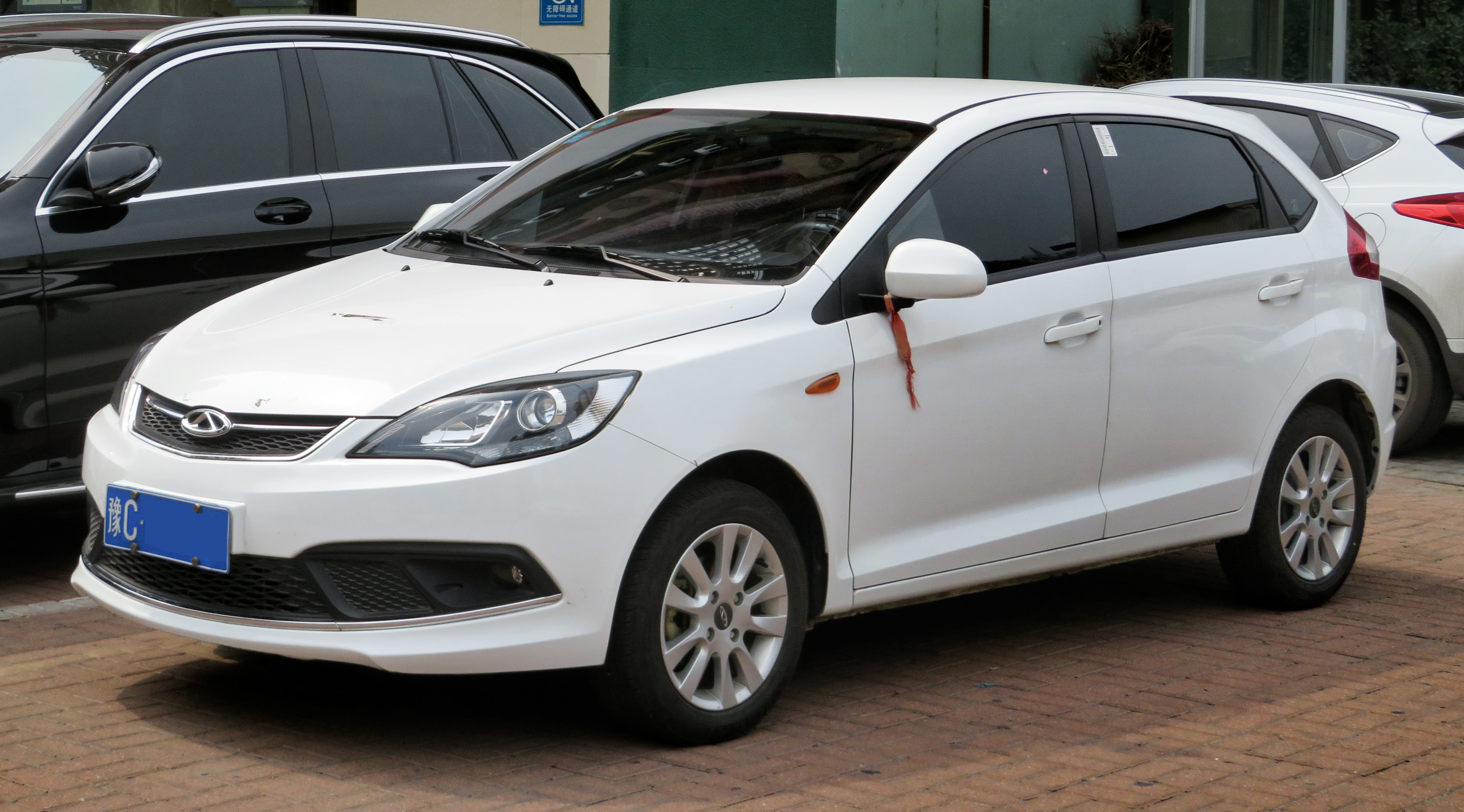
Chery Fulwin 2 hatchback (facelift)

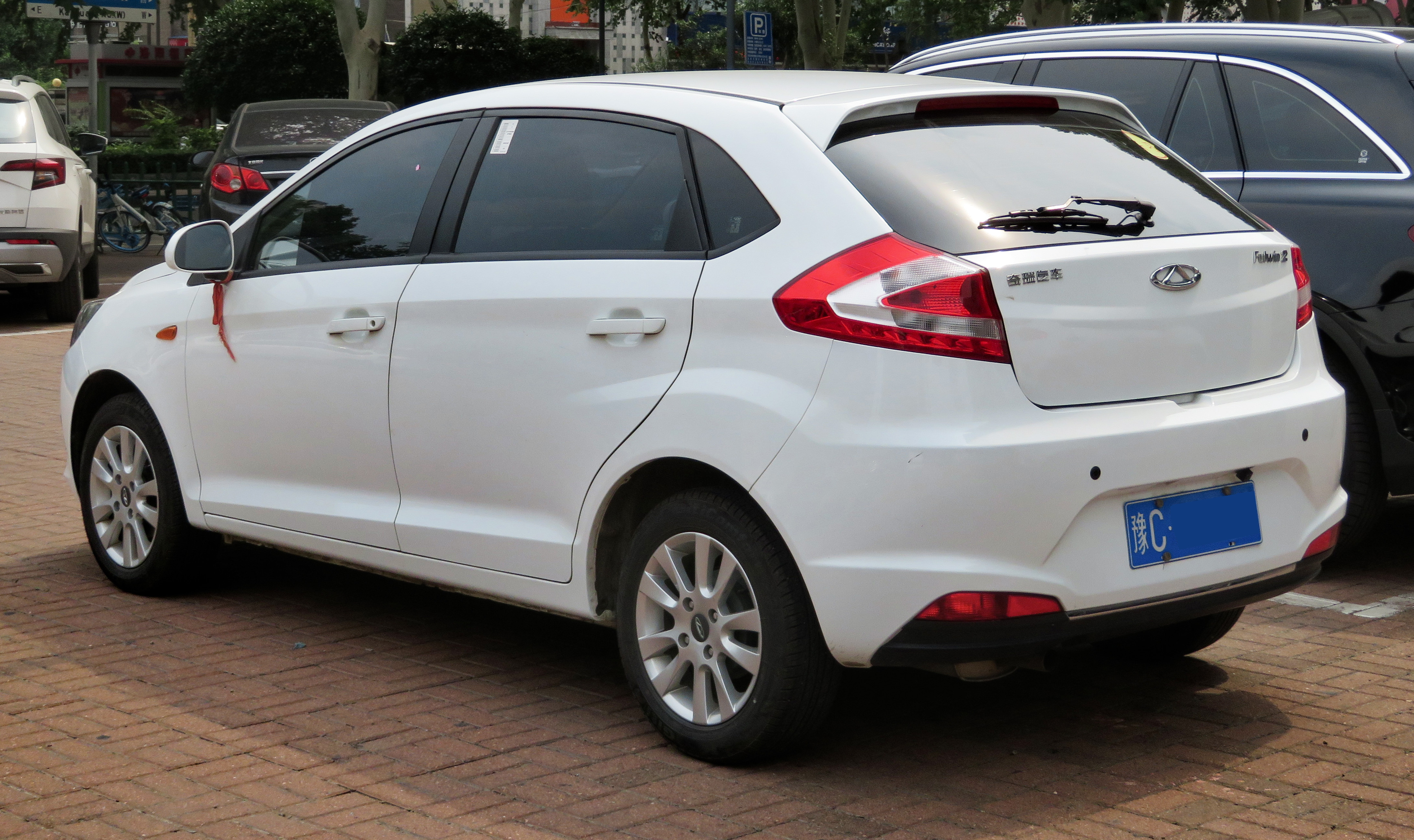
Chery Fulwin 2 hatchback (facelift)

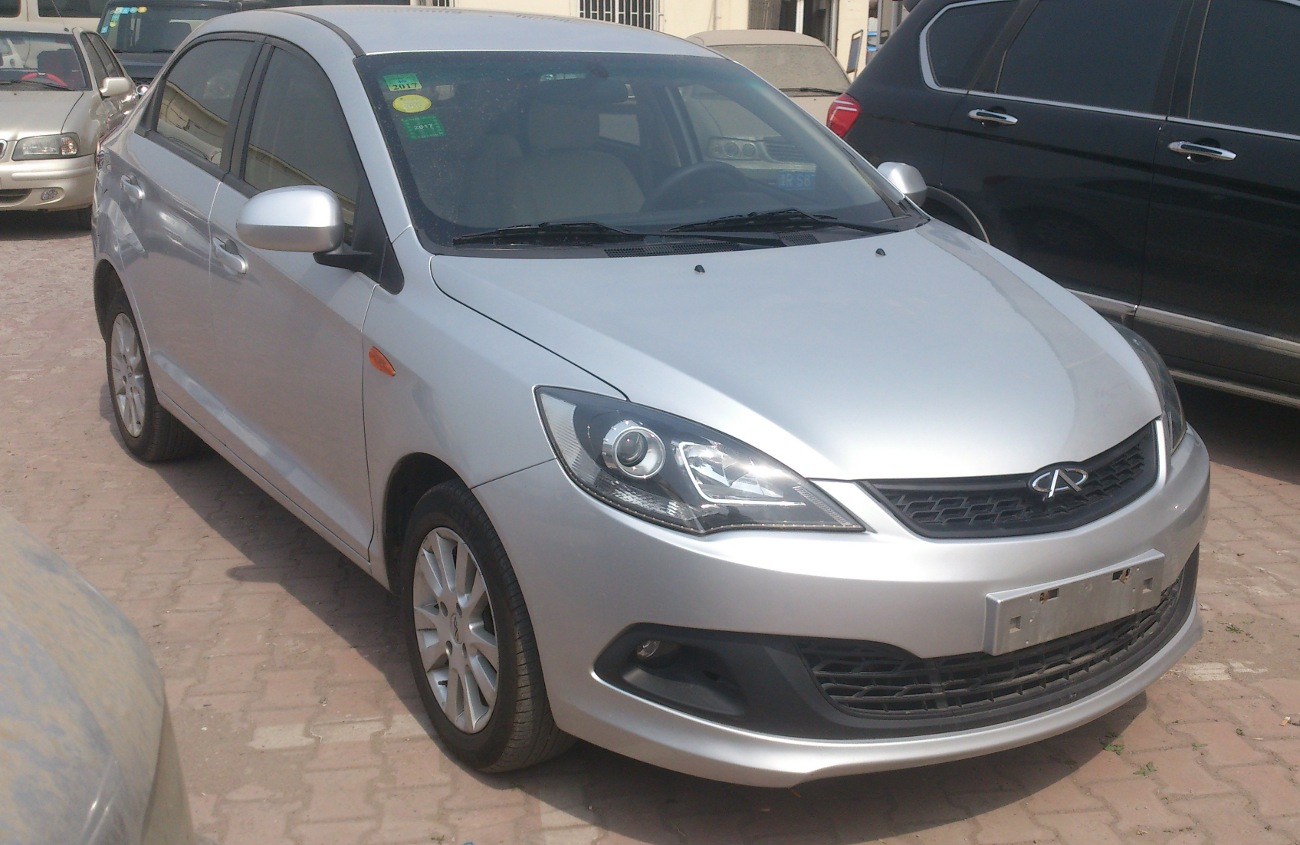
Chery Fulwin 2 sedan (facelift)

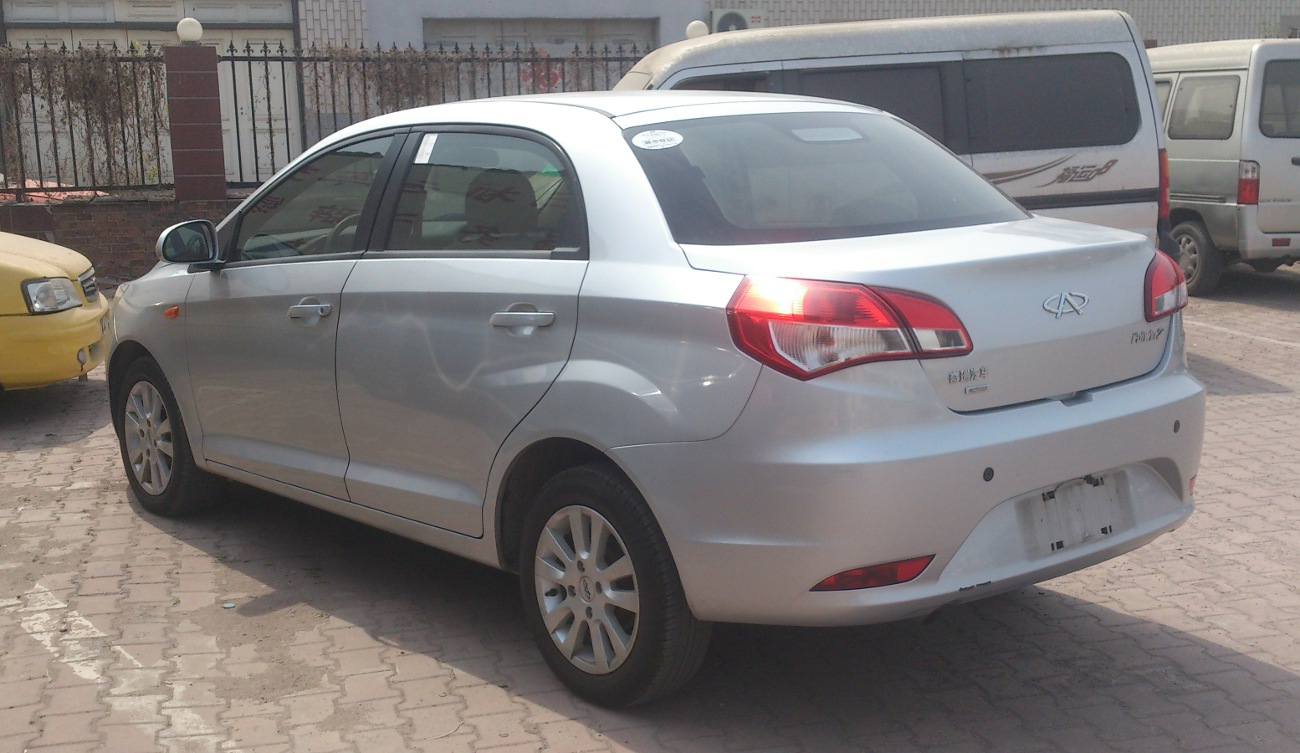
Chery Fulwin 2 sedan (facelift)
