= Lynk & Co 03 =

Chinese compact sedan

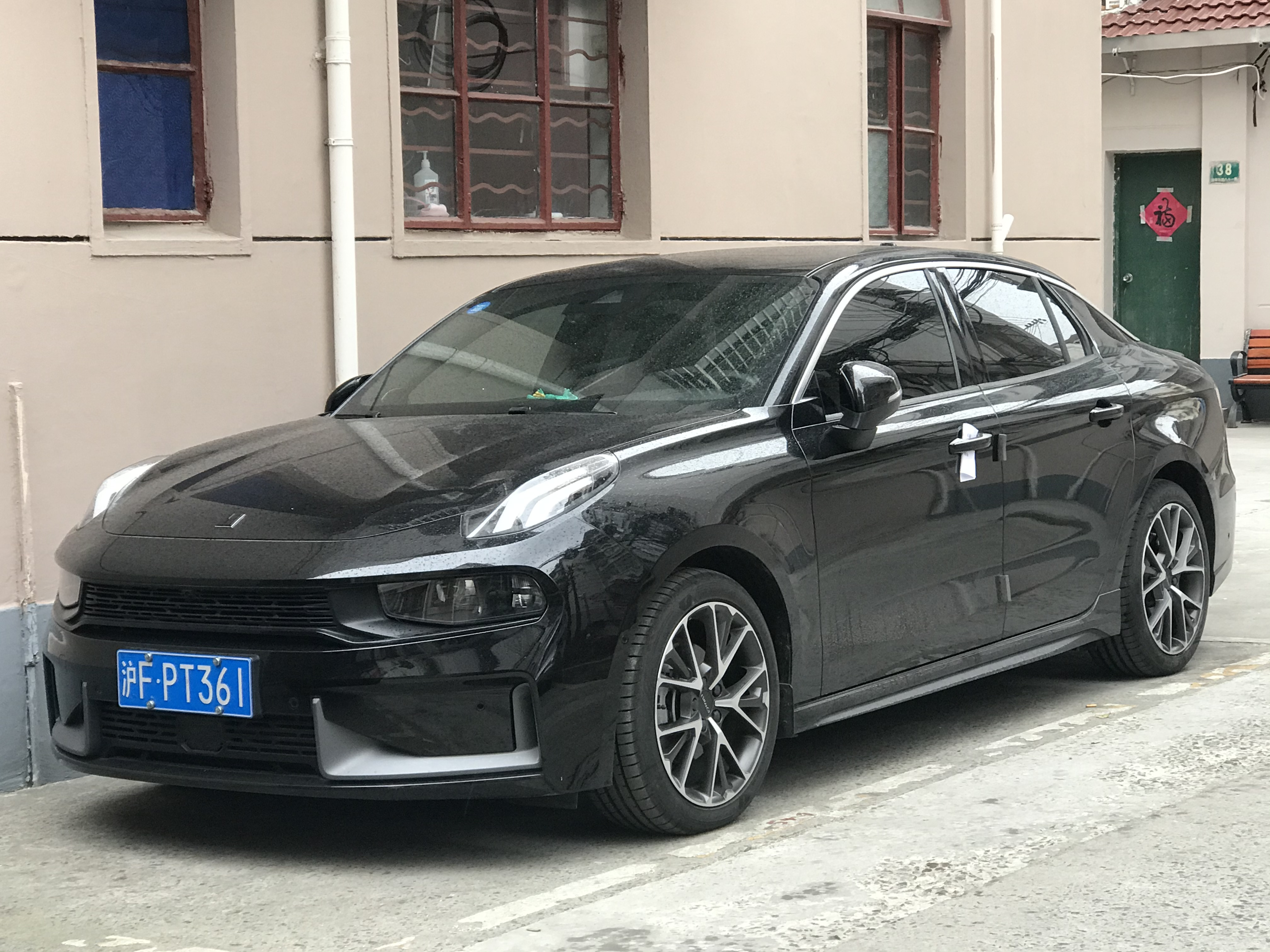

Overview
- Manufacturer: Lynk & Co (Geely)
- Model code: CS11
- Production: 2018–present
- Model years: 2018–present
- Assembly: China: Zhangjiakou (Lynk & Co Zhangjiakou Plant)
- Designer: Eric Leong, Hirash Razaghi

Body and chassis
- Class: Subcompact executive car (C)
- Body style: 4-door sedan
- Layout: Front-engine, front-wheel-drive; Front-engine, all-wheel-drive (03+)
- Platform: CMA platform

Powertrain
- Engine: Petrol: 1.5T GB15T2 I3; 1.5T JLH-3G15TDC I3; 1.5T JLH-3G15TD I3; 2.0T B4204T23 I4; 2.0T B4204L43 I4; Petrol plug-in hybrid: 1.5L JLH-3G15TD Turbo I3
- Electric motor: 82 PS (60 kW; 81 hp) Permanent Magnet Synchronous Motors (03 PHEV)
- Transmission: 6-speed manual; 6-speed Aisin AWTF-80SC automatic; 7-speed 7DCT330 dual-clutch; 8-speed Aisin AWF8F35 automatic (03+); 3-speed Geely DHE15 automatic (PHEV)

Dimensions
- Wheelbase: 2,730 mm (107.5 in)
- Length: 4,657 mm (183.3 in); 4,684 mm (184.4 in) (2023)
- Width: 1,840 mm (72.4 in); 1,843 mm (72.6 in) (2023); 1,901 mm (74.8 in) (2027)
- Height: 1,460 mm (57.5 in)
- Curb weight: 1,454–1,522 kg (3,206–3,355 lb)

The Lynk & Co 03 (Chinese: 领克03; pinyin: Lǐng kè 03) is a compact sedan manufactured by Chinese-Swedish automaker Lynk & Co as the sedan version of Lynk & Co 02. The Lynk & Co 03 sedan went on sale in October 2018 and was developed by China Euro Vehicle Technology AB (CEVT), a Swedish subsidiary to Geely.

== Overview ==
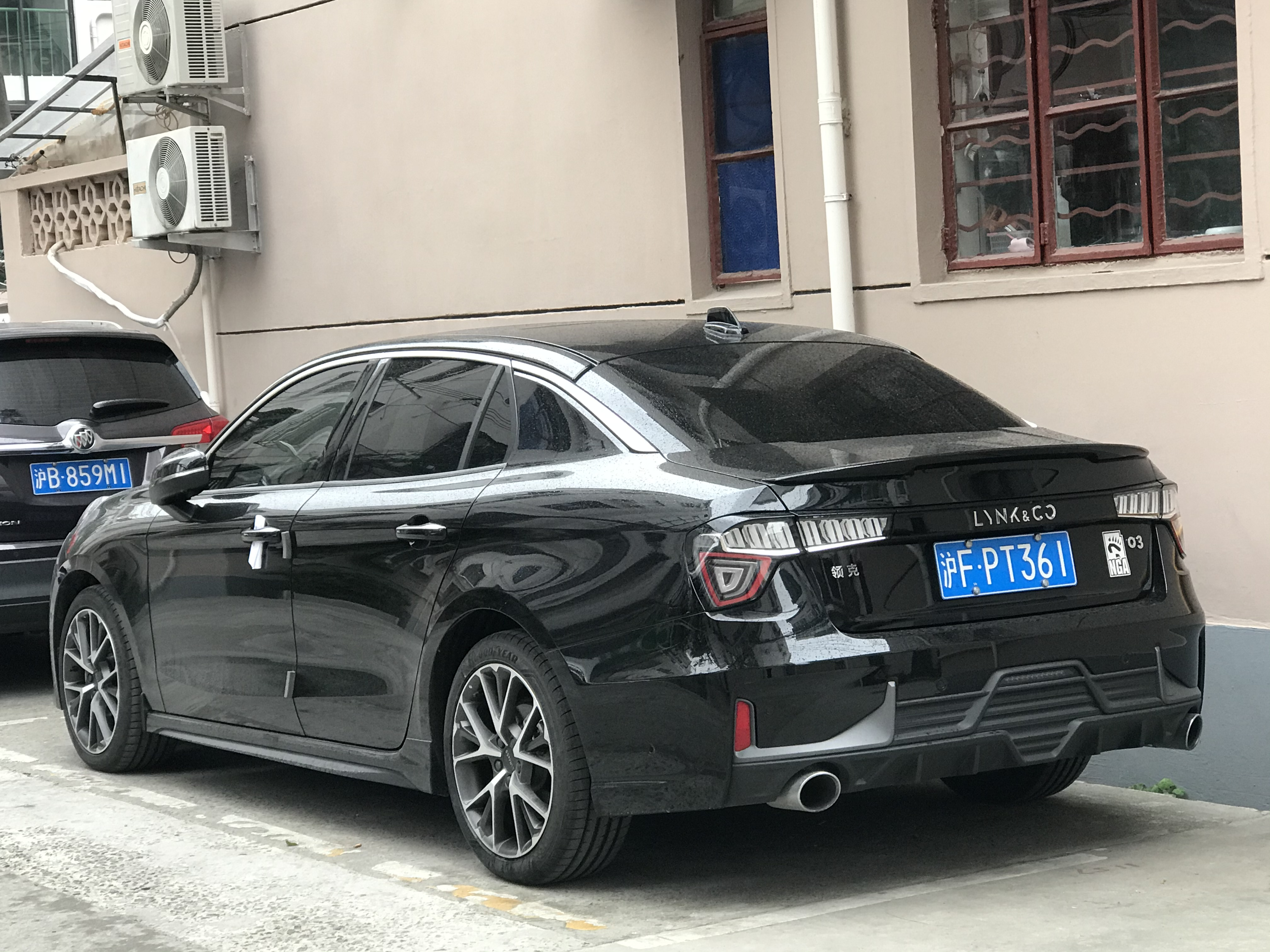
Lynk & Co 03 rear

The Lynk & Co 03 went on sale in October 2018 and was designed mechanically similar to Lynk & Co 02, which is also based on the Compact Modular Architecture platform.

Lynk & Co 03 made its first appearance in September 2018 during the Chengdu Auto Show in China. The new car provides engine options including a 156 hp (116 kW; 158 PS) 1.5-liter turbo, a 180 hp (134 kW; 182 PS) 1.5-liter turbo, and a 190 hp (142 kW; 193 PS) 2.0 liter turbo. The available gearboxes are a 6-speed manual transmission and a 7-speed dual-clutch transmission. It sells between 116,800 and 151,800 RMB in China.

=== 03+ and 03+ Cyan ===
In June 2019, the performance version Lynk & Co 03+ was launched powered by a 2-liter turbocharged petrol engine with a power output of 254 hp (189 kW; 258 PS) and 350 N⋅m (258 lb⋅ft) of torque. In August 2021, a special edition called the Lynk & Co 03+ Cyan Edition was launched.

The 03+ Cyan is fitted with a turbocharged 2.0-liter engine producing 261 hp (195 kW; 265 PS) and 380 N⋅m (280 lb⋅ft) of torque. Power is sent to all four wheels through an 8-speed automatic transmission capable of a 0–100 km/h (0-62 mph) acceleration in 5.7 seconds. The Cyan Edition carries the iconic Cyan Racing color, Cyan Racing emblems, unique Cyan Racing design rims, Akebono brakes, Michelin Pilot Sport 4S tires, adjustable Bilstein dampers, a carbon fiber front splitter and adjustable rear wing, and new front seats with embroidered Cyan logos. The car is sold exclusively in China.

The 03+ is priced from 154,800 to 228,800 yuan. The 03+ Cyan Edition is priced at 236,800 and 256,800 yuan.

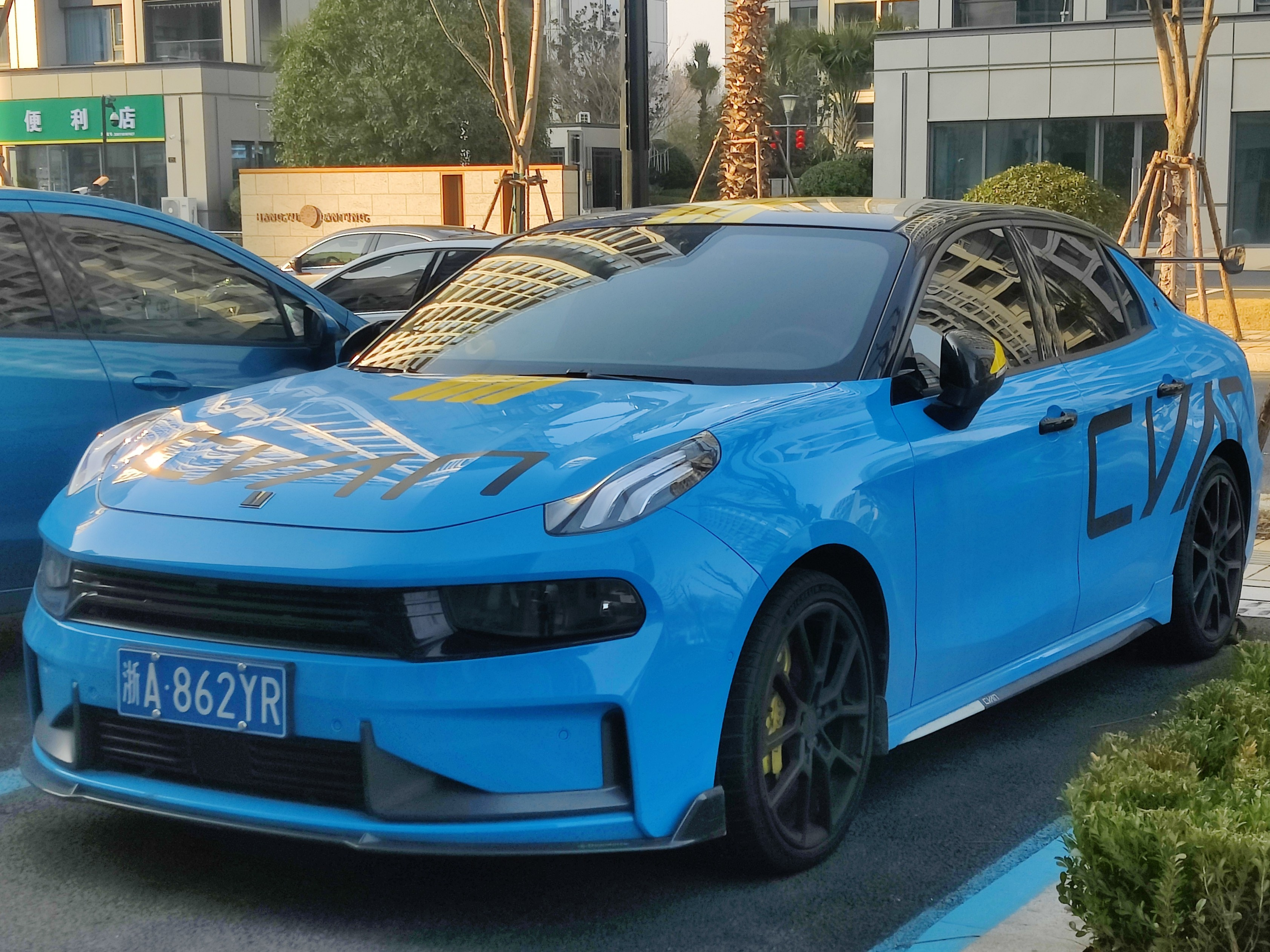
Lynk & Co 03+ Cyan Edition front

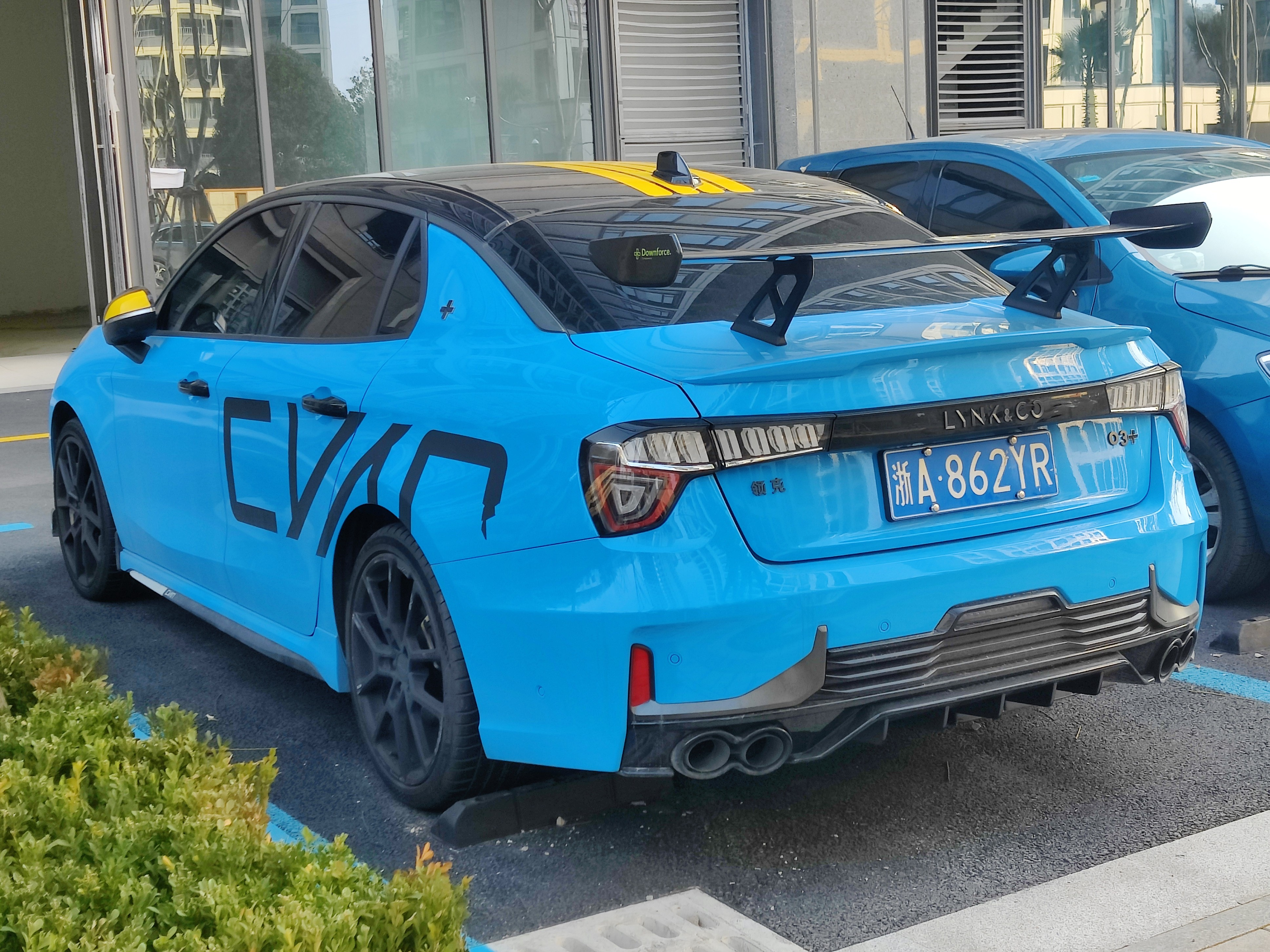
Lynk & Co 03+ Cyan Edition rear

=== 2023 facelift ===
The first Lynk & Co 03 facelift made its market debut in China in September 2022, featuring significantly redesigned exterior and interior and was marketed as the second generation 03. The updated 03 has 254 hp (189 kW; 258 PS) and a starting price of 21,700 USD. In terms of driving assist systems, the facelift 03 got 25 autonomous driving sensors, including 12 ultrasonic radars and 5 mmWave radars. Qualcomm 8155 chips power the autonomous driving system of the Lynk & Co 03. The powertrain of the facelift model features a 2-liter turbocharged engine developing 215 hp (160 kW; 218 PS) in the entry-level model, and 251 hp (187 kW; 254 PS) with 350 N⋅m (258 lb⋅ft) in the mid-spec pairing with a 7-speed DCT. As for the facelift 03+, it will be powered by a 262 hp (195 kW; 266 PS) engine, all-wheel drive, and transmission is an 8AT.

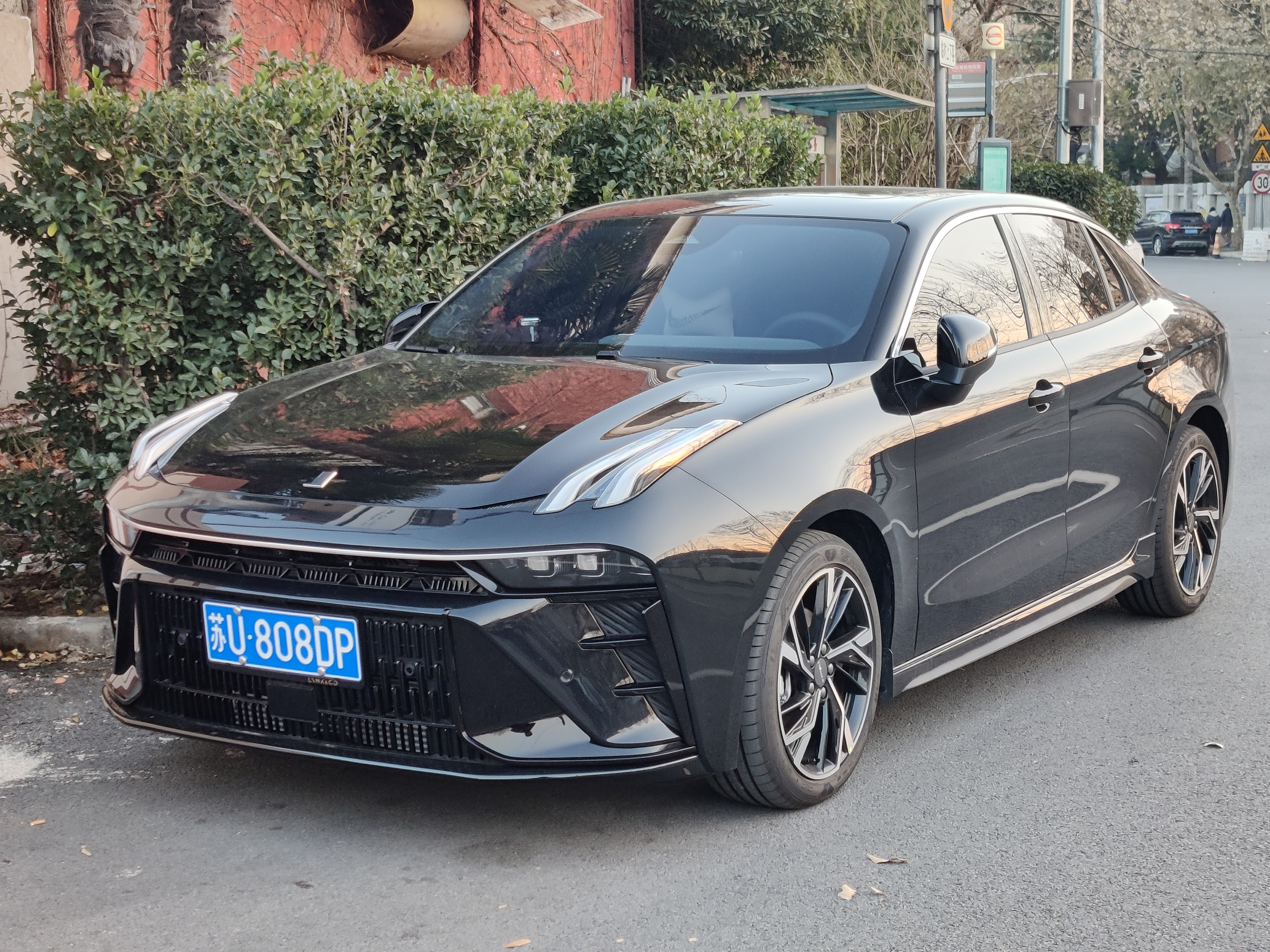
Lynk & Co 03 2023MY

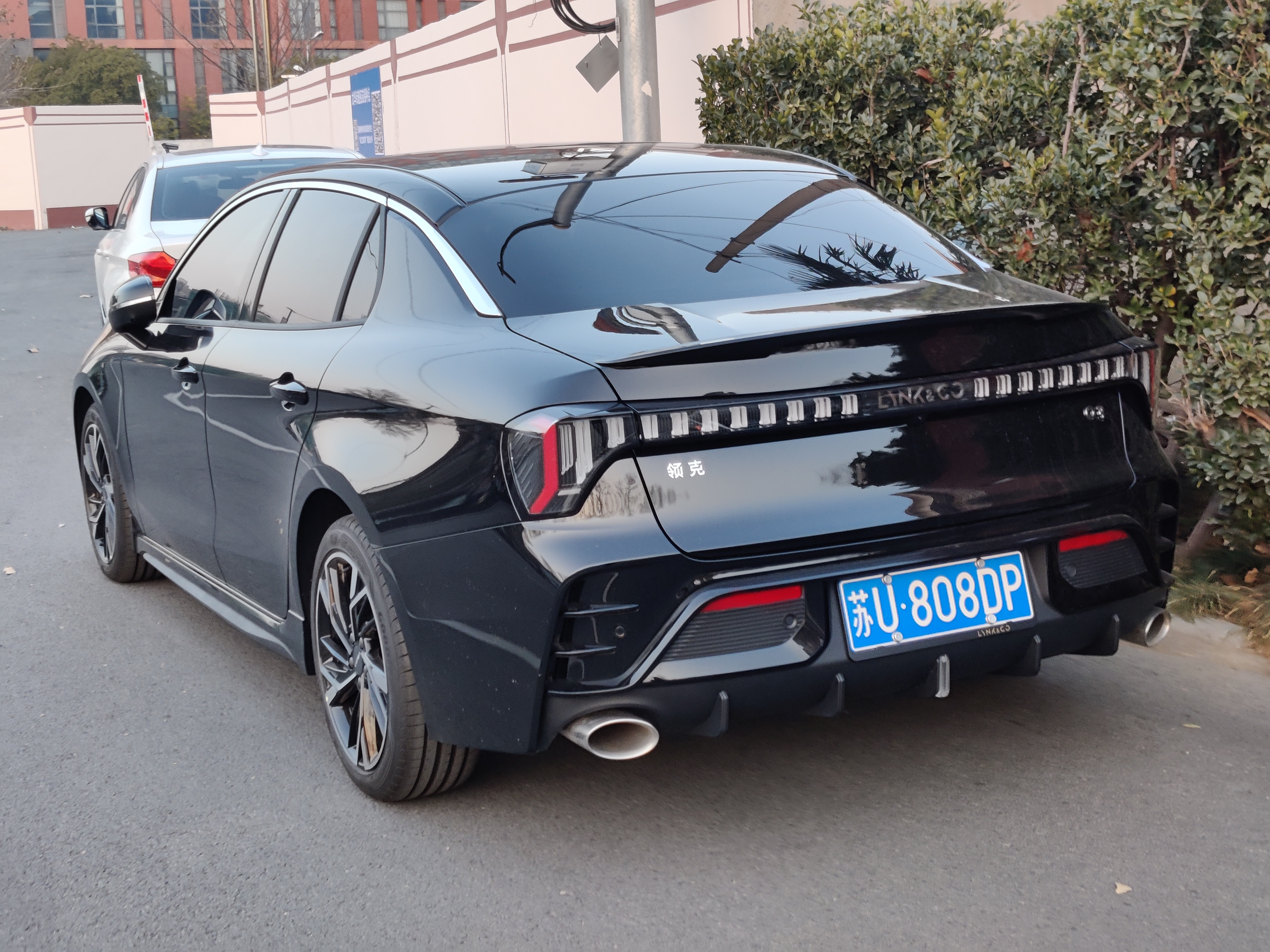
Lynk & Co 03 2023MY

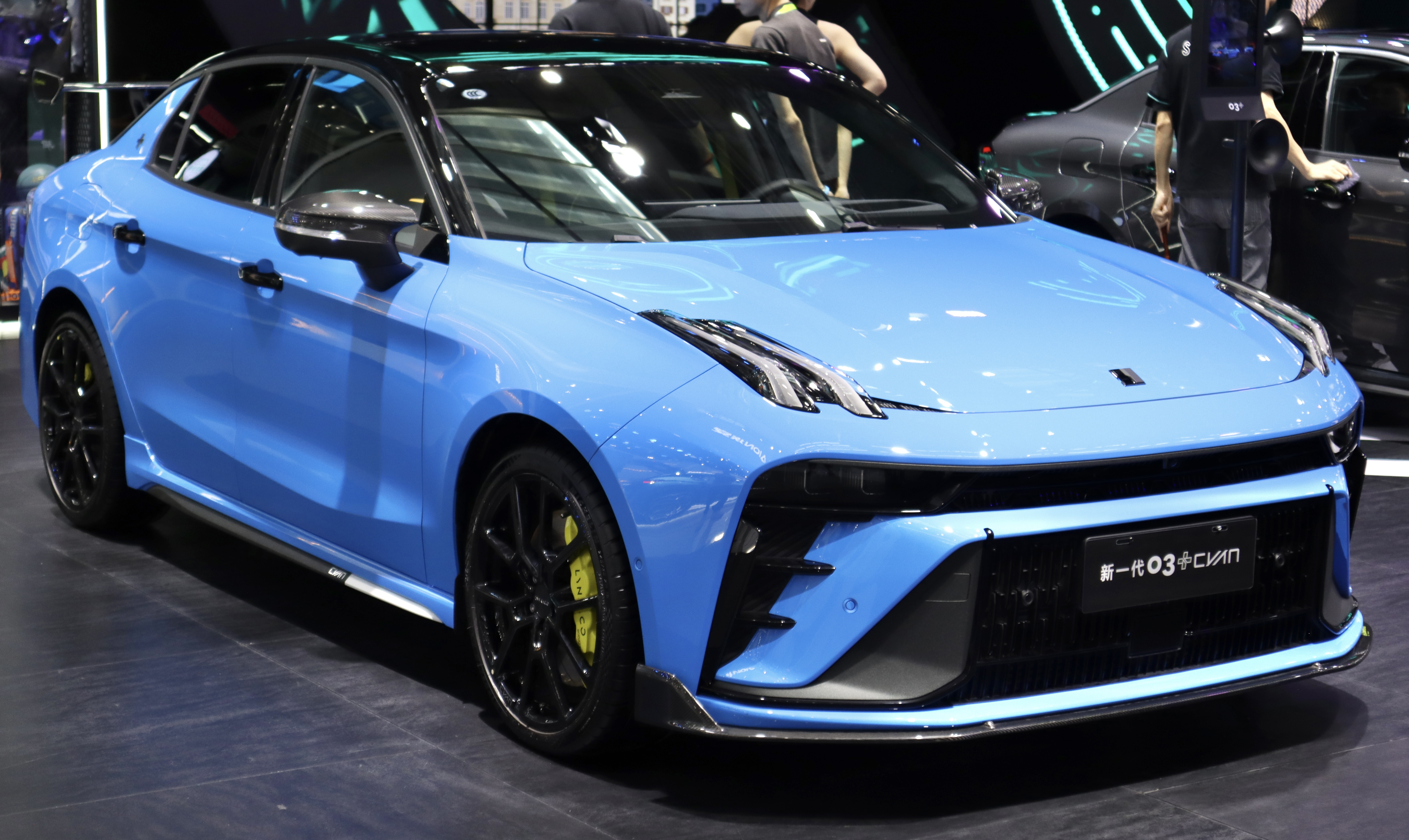
Lynk & Co 03+ Cyan 2023MY

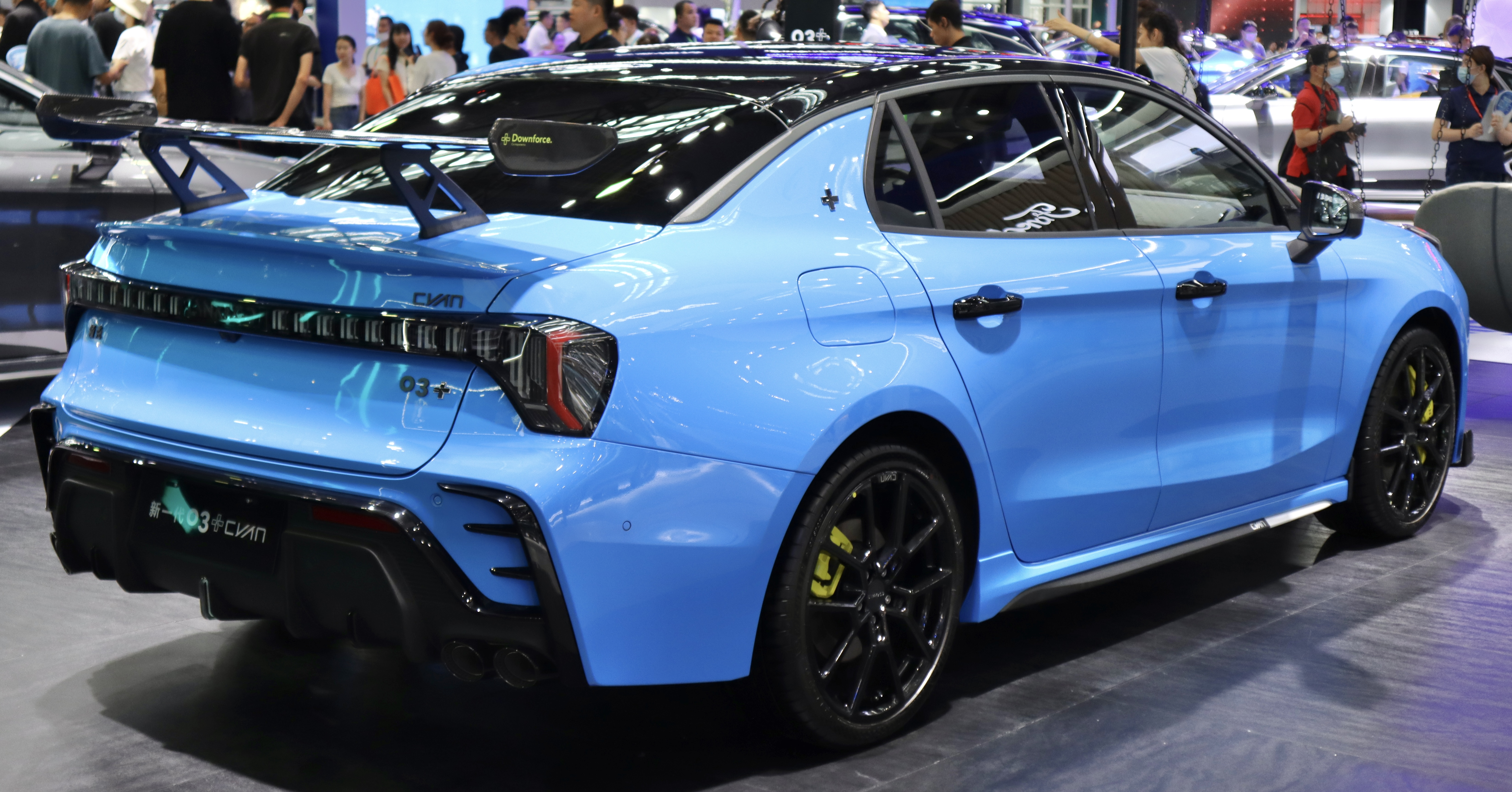
Lynk & Co 03+ Cyan 2023MY

==== 03+Racing and 03+TCR Cyan ====
The 03+Racing and 03+ TCR Cyan are based on the 03+ Cyan Edition, jointly developed by Lynk & Co and the Cyan Racing Team, and both versions of the car are equipped with the Polestar B4204L43 supercharged and turbocharged engine paired with a specially tuned Aisin 8-speed automatic transmission. The maximum power reaches 345 hp (257 kW; 350 PS), with a peak torque of 450 N⋅m (332 lb⋅ft).

The two models were launched on 18 October 2023, with the starting prices of 285,800 CNY for 03+Racing and 420,300 CNY for 03+TCR Cyan. An extra carbon fiber wide body kit is optional for 03+Racing with the price of 40,000 CNY. According to Lynk & Co, the production of 03+Racing and 03+TCR Cyan are very limited. Only 30 of the two models will be built per month.

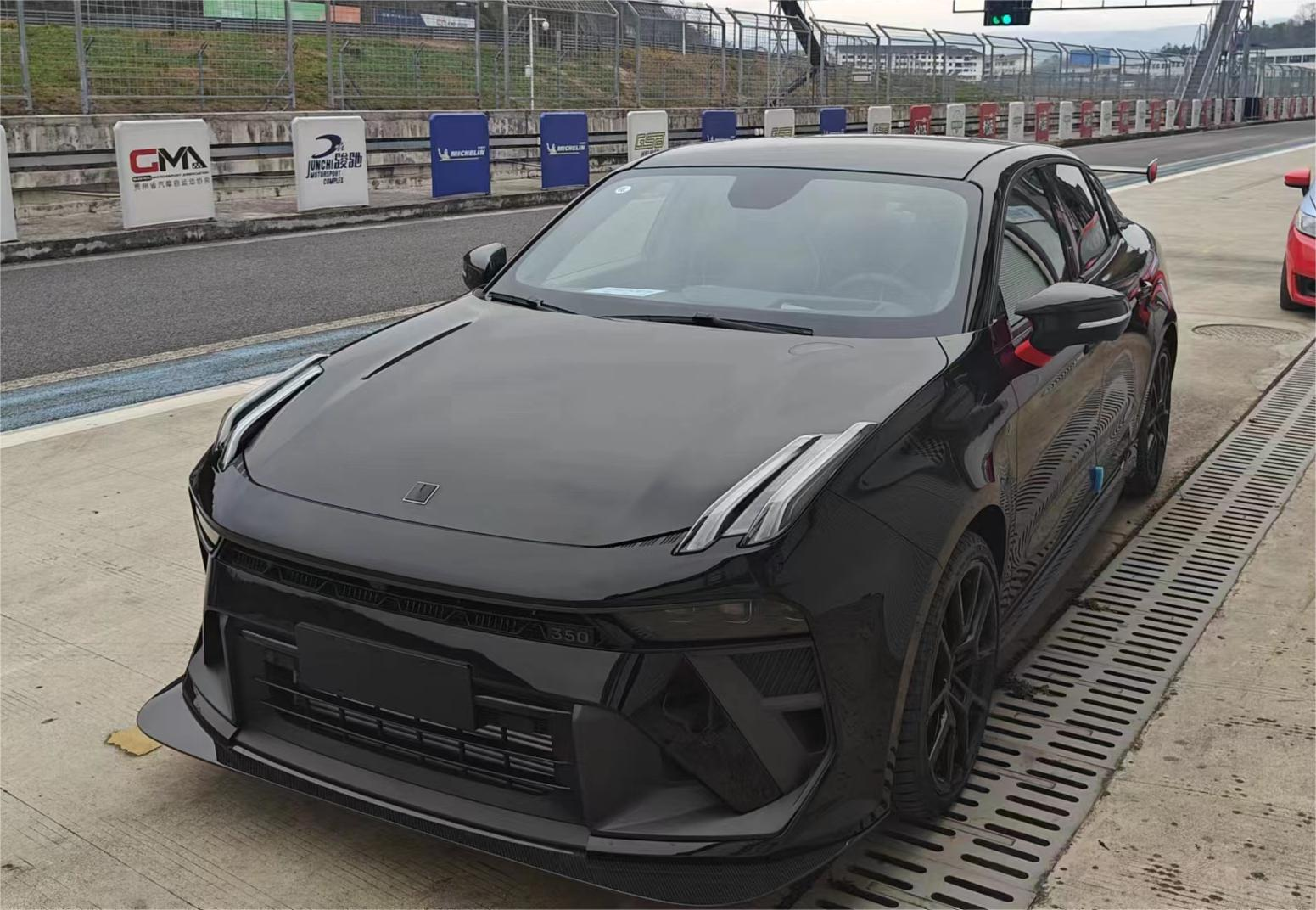
Lynk & Co 03+Racing

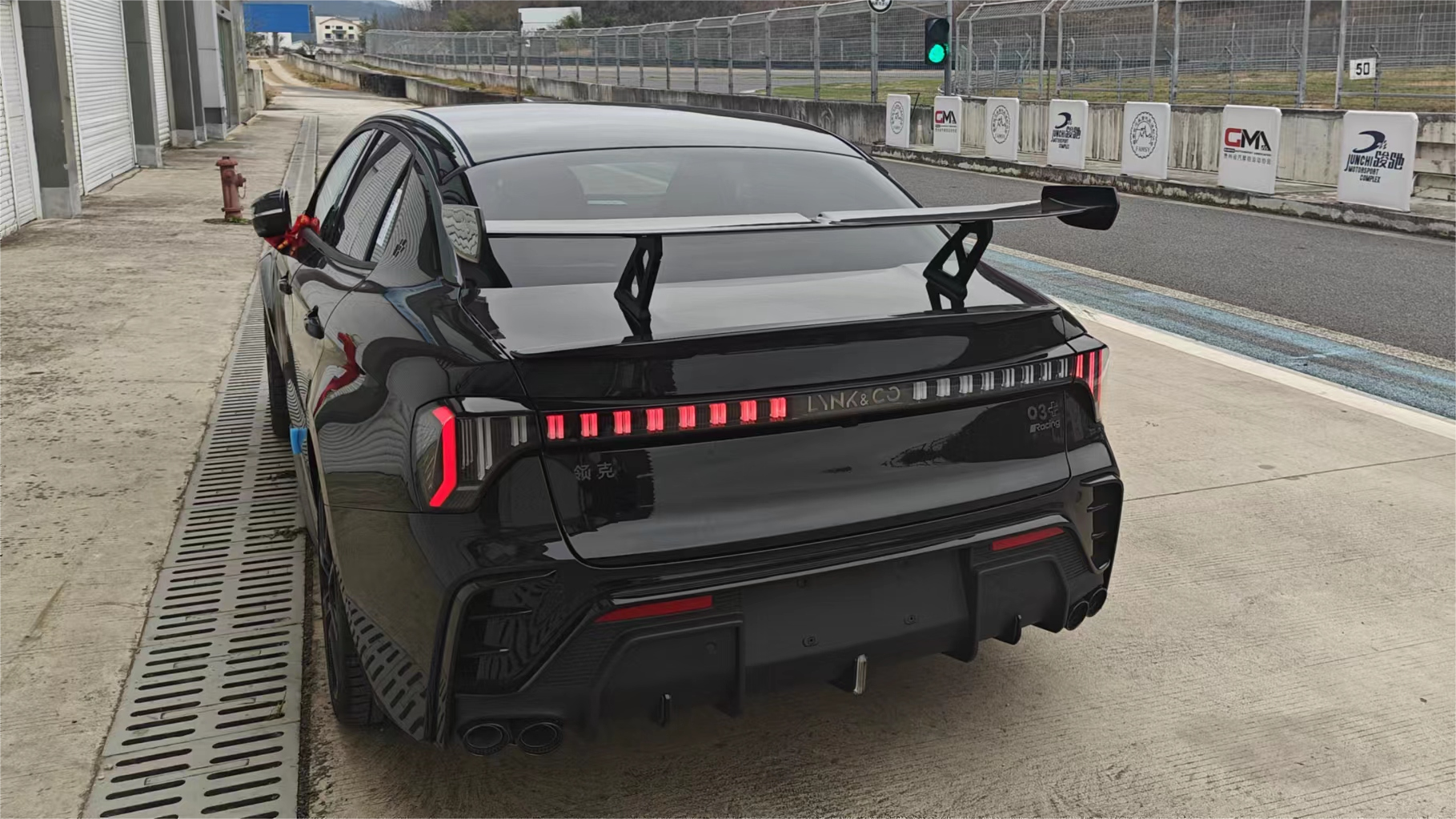
Lynk & Co 03+Racing

The 03+TCR Cyan is a four-door, two-seat front-wheel-drive version, with a design that resembles a road-legal version of the 03 TCR race car. The exterior features a wide-body design, with the rear design inspired by the 03 Cyan Concept, featuring a diagonal quad exhaust and "goose-neck" style wing to balance aerodynamics and aesthetics. The interior includes FIA-certified lightweight racing bucket seats, and it can be retrofitted with a six-point safety harness for a track-style experience. A track roll cage can be retrofitted in the rear for enhanced track safety. It reduces weight by approximately 150 kg (330 lb) and improves the braking system, transmission, and engine cooling optimization. Lynk & Co states that it can sprint at full speed for 5 laps at the Ningbo International Circuit without a loss of power by overheating. The car is equipped with Michelin CUP2 high-performance tires is only available in blue.

The 03+Racing is a four-door, five-seat all-wheel-drive version and offers an optional "wide-body package." It accelerates from 0 to 100 kilometers per hour in 4.89 seconds. It features a three-stage adjustable carbon fiber rear wing, Akebono brake calipers, and Michelin PS4S tires for outstanding grip and enhanced handling performance. Inherited from the Cyan Edition, the car comes with ten-stage adjustable Bilstein shock absorbers, ensuring suspension performance. The 03+Racing is only available in black.

The 03+Racing is pricied at 285,800 yuan while 03+TCR Cyan is priced at 420,300 yuan.

==== 03+ Champion Edition Pro ====
The 03+ Champion Edition Pro is a special edition model of the 03+ that was introduced in August 2024 for the 2025 model year. It comes standard with an exclusive gold exterior known as Dune Gold. It is available with two engine choices: a 1.5 litre turbocharged four cylinder producing 181 horsepower and a 2 litre turbocharged four cylinder powertrain producing 254 horsepower. Transmission choices as standard consist of the 7 speed dual clutch automatic for the 1.5 and an 8 speed automatic option for the 2 litre unit. With five trim levels available, pricing ranges from 127,800 yuan to 218,800 yuan.

=== 2025 facelift ===
A second major facelift was launched in October 2025 marketed as the third generation 03.

Lynk & Co 03 2025 facelift

Rear

=== 2027 facelift ===
The 2027 model year facelift was unveiled in October 2026. Being the third major facelift of the 03, the 2027 model year features new front and rear end designs with a significantly wider body with a width of 1901mm. The 1.5 liter turbo engine was also optimised to produce 148kW.

Lynk & Co 03 2027 facelift

Rear

=== Powertrain ===
Model	Engine/Motor	Transmission	Power output	Torque	Layout
03 1.5TD Lite	JLH-3G15TD 1.5L (1477cc) I3 turbocharged	6-speed manual	115 kW (154 hp) at 5000 rpm	245 N⋅m (181 lb⋅ft) at 1450-5000 rpm	FF
03 1.5TD DCT	JLH-3G15TD 1.5L (1477cc) I3 turbocharged	Geely 7DCT330 7-speed DCT	132 kW (177 hp) at 5500 rpm	196 N⋅m (145 lb⋅ft) at 1500-4000 rpm	FF
03 1.5TD DCT (2023 MY)	BHE15-EFZ 1.5L (1499cc) I4 turbocharged	Geely 7DCT330 7-speed DCT	133 kW (178 hp) at 5500 rpm	196 N⋅m (145 lb⋅ft) at 2000-3500 rpm	FF
03 EM-F	DHE15-ESZ 1.5L (1480cc) I3 turbocharged 1x electric motor (front)	Geely DHE15 3-speed DHT	Combined: 180 kW (241 hp) Engine: 110 kW (148 hp)at 5500 rpm Motor: 100 kW (134 hp)	Combined: 545 N⋅m (402 lb⋅ft) Engine: 225 N⋅m (166 lb⋅ft)at 2500-4000 rpm Motor: 320 N⋅m (236 lb⋅ft)	FF
03 2.0TD	JLH-4G20TD 2.0L (1969cc) I4 turbocharged	Aisin AWTF-80SC 6-speed automatic	140 kW (188 hp) at 4700 rpm	300 N⋅m (221 lb⋅ft) at 1400-4000 rpm	FF
03 2.0TD DCT	JLH-4G20TDC 2.0L (1969cc) I4 turbocharged	Geely 7DCT330 7-speed DCT	187 kW (251 hp) at 5500 rpm	350 N⋅m (258 lb⋅ft) at 1800-4800 rpm	FF
03+	JLH-4G20TDC 2.0L (1969cc) I4 turbocharged	Aisin AWF8F35 8-speed automatic	187 kW (251 hp) at 5500 rpm	380 N⋅m (280 lb⋅ft) at 1800-4800 rpm	4WD
03+ (2023 MY)	JLH-4G20TDH 2.0L (1969cc) I4 turbocharged	Aisin AWF8F35 8-speed automatic	195 kW (261 hp) at 5500 rpm	380 N⋅m (280 lb⋅ft) at 2000-4000 rpm	4WD
03+ Cyan	JLH-4G20TDH 2.0L (1969cc) I4 turbocharged	Aisin AWF8F35 8-speed automatic	195 kW (261 hp) at 5500 rpm	380 N⋅m (280 lb⋅ft) at 2000-4000 rpm	4WD
03+Racing	B4204L43 2.0L (1969cc) I4 supercharged + turbocharged	Aisin AWF8F35 8-speed automatic (modified)	257 kW (345 hp) at 6000rpm	450N⋅m at 3000-5000rpm	4WD
03+TCR Cyan	B4204L43 2.0L (1969cc) I4 supercharged + turbocharged	Aisin AWF8F35 8-speed automatic (modified)	257 kW (345 hp) at 6000rpm	450N⋅m at 3000-5000rpm	FF
03 TCR	JLH-4G20TD 2.0L (1969cc) I4 turbocharged	Xtrac 6-speed Sequential	261 kW (350 hp) at 6000 rpm	450N⋅m at 3000-5000rpm	FF

== Motorsport ==
The Lynk & Co 03 took part in the 2019 World Touring Car Cup with the car being built by Cyan Racing according to the TCR regulations. The cars were driven by Thed Björk, Yann Ehrlacher, Yvan Muller and Andy Priaulx.

On 21 November 2020, at the Guia Race of Macau, Ma Qing Hua, driving for Shell Teamwork Lynk & Co Motorsport, finished second in the qualifying race of the 2020 TCR China Touring Car Championship season finale, securing the drivers’ title.

== Sales ==
Year	China
2020	70,334
2021	76,461
2022	53,857
2023	70,365
2024	54,709
2025	56,580
