= III =

III or iii may refer to:

== Companies ==
- Information International, Inc., a computer technology company
- Innovative Interfaces, Inc., a library-software company
- 3i, formerly Investors in Industry, a British investment company

== Other uses ==
- Institute for Information Industry, research institute in Taiwan
- Insurance Information Institute, a US industry organization
- Insurance Institute of India, an Indian organisation for training
- Intelligence and Information Institute, a fictional US government organization in the comic version of Transformers
- Interactive Investor International
- Interstate Identification Index, an index of criminal records maintained by the FBI

== See also ==
- 3 (disambiguation), including all uses of the Roman numeral "III" as a number
- 1/3 (disambiguation)
- Number Three (disambiguation)
- The Third (disambiguation)
- Third (disambiguation)
- Third party (disambiguation)
- Third person (disambiguation)
