= Third =

Third or 3rd may refer to:

== Numbers ==
- 3rd, the ordinal form of the cardinal number 3
- 1/3, a fraction of one third
- ^{1}/_{60} of a second, i.e., the third in a series of fractional parts in a sexagesimal number system

== Places ==
- 3rd meridian east, a line of longitude extending through Europe and Africa
- 3rd meridian west, a line of longitude extending through Europe and Africa
- 3rd parallel north, a circle of latitude above the Equator
- 3rd parallel south, a circle of latitude below the Equator
- 3rd Street (disambiguation)
- Third Avenue (disambiguation)
- Highway 3
- Third Beach, located at Ferguson Point in Stanley Park in Vancouver, British Columbia
- Third Brook, flows into West Brook by Walton, New York

== Music ==
=== Music theory ===
- Interval number of three in a musical interval
  - Major third, a third spanning four semitones
  - Minor third, a third encompassing three half steps, or semitones
  - Neutral third, wider than a minor third but narrower than a major third
  - Augmented third, an interval of five semitones
  - Diminished third, produced by narrowing a minor third by a chromatic semitone
- Third (chord), chord member a third above the root
- Degree (music), three away from tonic
  - Mediant, third degree of the diatonic scale
  - Submediant, sixth degree of the diatonic scale – three steps below the tonic
  - Chromatic mediant, chromatic relationship by thirds
- Ladder of thirds, similar to the circle of fifths

=== Albums ===
- Third/Sister Lovers, a 1974 album by Big Star first released in 1978
- Third (Soft Machine album), 1970
- Third (Portishead album), 2008
- Third (Cait Brennan album), a 2017 album by Cait Brennan
- 3rd (The Rasmus EP), 1996
- 3rd (The Baseball Project album), released by The Baseball Project in 2014
- Thirds (album), a 1971 album by the James Gang

== Time ==
- 3rd century
- 3rd century BC

=== Dates ===
- Third of the month, a recurring calendar date
  - Third of January
  - Third of February
  - Third of March
  - Third of April
  - Third of May
  - Third of June
  - Third of July
  - Third of August
  - Third of September
  - Third of October
  - Third of November
  - Third of December

== Other uses ==
- Third (play), a 2005 work by Wendy Wasserstein
- Third (curling), a curling position
- Thirds, third-born children in the 1985 novel Ender's Game
- Thirds, a 2007 play by Jacob M. Appel
- Third World, economically underdeveloped nations
- Third-class degree, a type of British undergraduate degree classification
- Third (angle), in astronomy and cartography, fraction of a degree
- Richard Third (1927–2016), Anglican bishop in the Church of England

== See also ==
- 1/3 (disambiguation)
- 3 (disambiguation)
- III (disambiguation)
- Number Three (disambiguation)
- The Third (disambiguation)
- Third base (disambiguation)
- Third degree (disambiguation)
- Third party (disambiguation)
- Third person (disambiguation)
- Third place, concept in sociology
- The Third Album (disambiguation)
- Triad (disambiguation)
- Third grade
- Third Fleet (disambiguation)
- Tierce (disambiguation)
