= 3PL =

3PL may refer to:

- Third-party logistics, a concept in logistics
- the Three parameter logistic model in item response theory
- a glossing abbreviation meaning "third person, plural number"
