= The Three Degrees (disambiguation) =

The Three Degrees are an African-American Female vocal trio.

The Three Degrees or Three Degrees may also refer to:

- The Three Degrees (album), a 1973 studio album by the trio
- "The Three Degrees" (song), a 2005 single by Irish singer Tara Blaise
- threedegrees, a communication and P2P application produced by Microsoft and frequently referred to as Three Degrees
- 3^{o} Kelvin (3K rounded from 2.7K) cosmic microwave radiation, see cosmic microwave background
- Cyrille Regis, Laurie Cunningham, and Brendon Batson, three Black British football players who played for West Bromwich Albion F.C. during the late 1970s, popularly nicknamed "the Three Degrees" after the pop group

== See also ==
- Three degrees of influence, a theory in the realm of Social Networks
- Third degree (disambiguation)
