= GoBolt =

Canadian logistics company

- Type: Private
- Industry: Logistics, third-party logistics
- Founded: 2017
- Founder: Mark Ang, Heindrik Bernabe
- Headquarters: Toronto, Ontario, Canada
- Area served: Canada, United States

GoBolt is a Canadian logistics company focused on third-party logistics. The company provides warehousing, fulfillment, shipping, and last-mile delivery services in Canada and the United States, with operations in several major metropolitan areas across seven U.S. states.

== Overview ==
GoBolt was founded in 2017 by Mark Ang and Heindrik Bernabe, originally under the name Second Closet, a valet storage service for university students. The company gradually transitioned to third-party logistics, rebranding as Bolt Logistics in 2021 and as GoBolt in 2022. The company is based in Toronto, Ontario.

The company began operating in the U.S. in 2022. During the same year, GoBolt acquired BoxKnight, a same-day delivery logistics company.

In December 2022, GoBolt secured $75 million CAD in its Series C round bringing the total funding received by the company to $222.5 million CAD, including previous rounds such as a $115 million CAD Series B in 2021 and a $33.2 million CAD Series A raised across two rounds.

GoBolt provide logistics services, including warehousing, order fulfillment, and last-mile delivery services, catering to e-commerce businesses. The company provides same-day and next-day delivery in selected regions.

The company uses electric vehicles for deliveries as part of its sustainability initiatives.
