= PIII =

PIII may refer to:

- Pentium III
- Plasma-immersion ion implantation
- Postal III
- Coffin bone, of a horse
- pIII, a coat protein used in phage display

== See also ==
- P3 (disambiguation)
