= YouTube automation =

Processes to automate content creation on YouTube

YouTube Automation is the process within the realm of digital content creation, wherein individuals or entities that own Youtube channels (referred to as channel owners) utilize automated tools and methodologies to manage and develop their channels. This process is often referred to as an online business model, which hinges on the premise of leveraging various software tools, strategies, and methodologies to operate and scale a YouTube channel with minimal manual intervention, usually by outsourcing the content production.

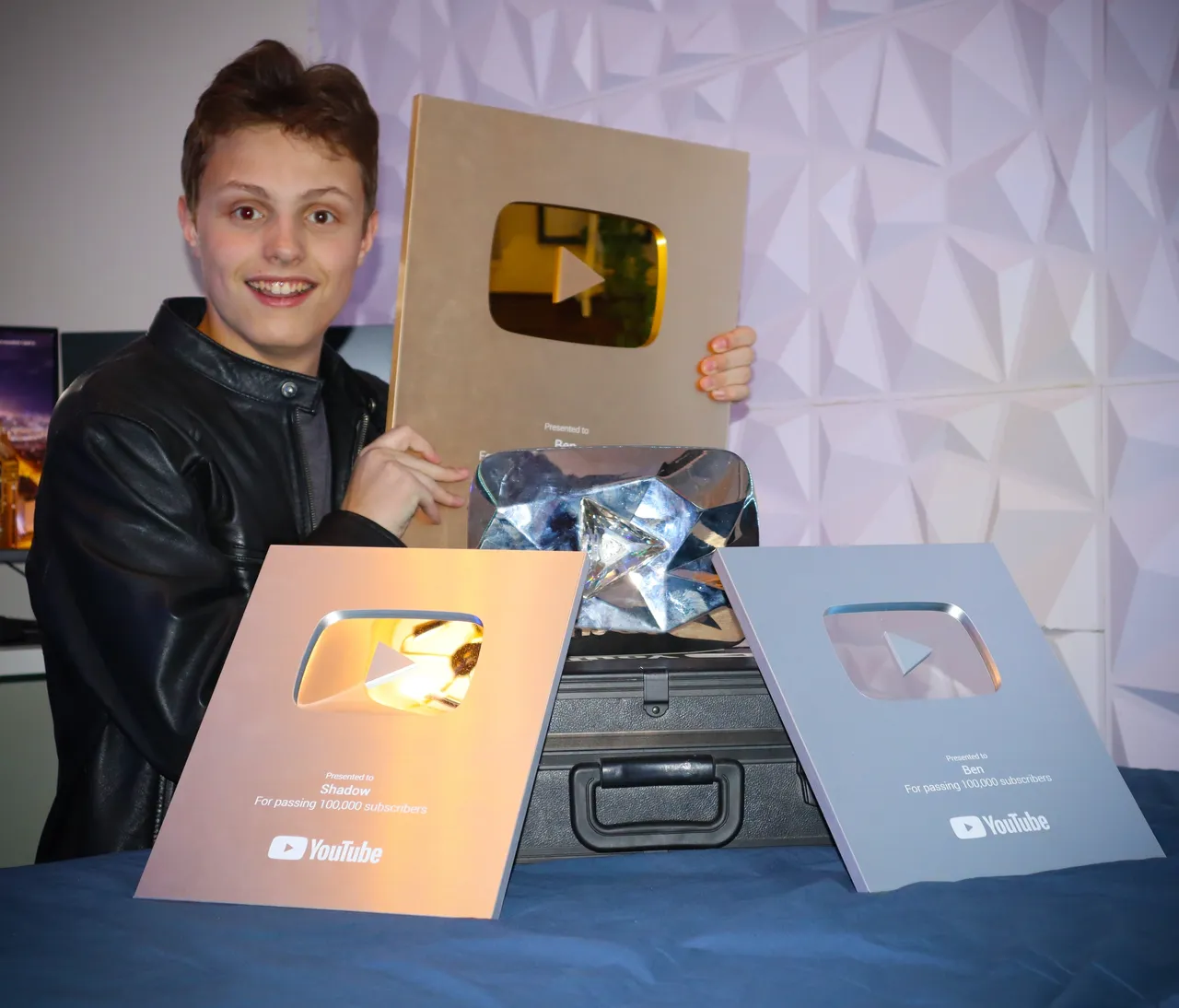
Ben Drucker (DruckerYTA) Promoting YouTube Automation as a way to make money online

YouTube Automation is noted for its scalability, enabling channel owners to potentially expand their channel's reach and content output without a corresponding increase in manual labor or time commitment. The model's flexibility is further underscored by its operability from any location with internet access. This business model has largely gained hype through YouTube creators and other influencers promoting it as a method for making money online utilizing a variety of AI Tools.

YouTube Automation is often associated with a notable aspect of content creation where the owners of the channels are not necessarily required to present themselves visually in their videos. The channel owners rather focus on the strategic oversight of content and overall channel direction, such as by employing sophisticated tools for tasks like search engine optimization, audience behavior analysis, and automated video production, facilitating a focus on strategic growth and content planning while the operational components are effectively handled through automated processes.

== Procedure ==
In this model, the responsibility for the content's strategic direction resides with the channel owner, yet the detailed execution of content production and routine channel management is typically delegated to automated systems, third-party service providers, freelancers, or the use of artificial intelligence (AI). This arrangement allows for the bypassing of extensive human resource requirements and significant time investments traditionally associated with video production, editing, and channel administration.

The implementation and integration of AI in the content creation process have become notable aspects of YouTube automation, mainly as a way to streamline research and production. AI is also utilized in generating voiceovers to enhance the audio quality of videos and in optimizing elements such as titles, descriptions, tags, and end screens for search engine optimization. Such optimizations can potentially boost a video's visibility and success on search engine result pages.

Central to the YouTube Automation business model are various streams of income, predominantly anchored by the YouTube Partner Program (YPP). In this program, channels generate revenue through advertisements displayed on their videos, with the income determined by the cost per mille metric that indicates the cost advertisers are willing to pay per thousand ad impressions. Additional possible income streams include sponsored content, merchandise sales or affiliated offers.

Ultimately, the channel's operational framework is designed to maximise viewer engagement and monetisation in the YouTube ecosystem, with the primary goal of establishing a revenue-generating system that operates efficiently with minimal direct intervention from the channel owner. This model emphasizes the technical aspects of channel management, such as title and thumbnail optimisation, rather than the content creation process itself.

== Challenges and criticisms ==
Despite the potential for scalability, YouTube automation is subject to criticisms and challenges. The authenticity of content raises a concern, with the risk that an over-reliance on automation may reflect on the content quality that lacks genuine engagement. Automated channels also risk policy violations, which can lead to account suspension and revenue loss due to breaches of YouTube's policies on copyright, spam, sensitive or misleading content.

The model's success is heavily reliant on a thorough understanding of, and adaptability to, the YouTube algorithm, which dictates viewer engagement and content recommendations. This results in a notable degree of income unpredictability, a factor that distinguishes it from other business models. Feedback from users on the model's effectiveness and profitability is mixed, with some reporting significant earnings while others highlight the substantial effort and time required before success can be realised.

A significant point of contention is the platform's policies on reused content, which have led to instances where channels operating under this model are flagged. YouTube's guidelines are designed to encourage original and authentic content creation, and the platform actively monitors for instances of reused content—defined as repurposing someone else's content without adding significant original commentary or educational value.

The model's emergence has given rise to a niche industry where online influencers market tutorials and promise rapid financial returns through YouTube automation strategies. However, skepticism surrounds these promises, often associated with quick-rich schemes in the online business realm. Moreover, this environment is conducive to the proliferation of insubstantial services offered by individuals more interested in capitalizing on the model's hype rather than providing genuine value. Such influencers promoting this business model on YouTube include David Omari, Matt Par, and Ben Drucker.
