= 3P =

3P or 3p may refer to:

== Business and government ==
- People, planet, profit: the triple bottom line
- Reserves, proven + probable + possible, a category of estimated amount of fossil fuel
- People's Policy Project, a US think tank
- Threepence (disambiguation), in coinage
- Public–private partnership, collaboration between the government and companies/organizations
- Product planning, product development, and purchasing, such as in the name of the business unit Volvo 3P

== Transportation ==
- Tiara Air N.V. (IATA: 3P; ICAO: TNM), an airline headquartered in Oranjestad, Aruba, Dutch Caribbean
- Italian: Tre Porte, lit. 'Three Doors', a body style of the Fiat 128 car
- Progress 3P, NASA's name for a Russian cargo spacecraft used to resupply the ISS; in Russian: Прогресс М-44

== Science ==
- The small arm of chromosome 3, such as in 3p deletion syndrome
- ³P, the term symbol for a triplet state with total orbital angular momentum 1 ("principal" in spectroscopic notation)
- 3p, a subshell atomic orbital

== Technology ==
- Three parallel ports, such as in the 3P+S Input/Output Module, a 1976 expansion card by Processor Technology
- "Programmable Preset Polyphonic", such as in the name of the Roland JX-3P, a Japanese analog synthesizer

== Arts and media ==
- 3p, a 2019 EP by Artigeardit
- "3Piece", such as in the name of Angel's 3Piece! (Japanese: 天使の3P!, romanized: Tenshi no 3P!, lit. 'Here Comes the Three Angels'), a Japanese light novel series written by Sagu Aoyama and illustrated by Tinkle

== See also ==
- P3 (disambiguation)
- PPP (disambiguation)
- TP (disambiguation)
- Third party (disambiguation)
- Third person (disambiguation)
- Search Wikipedia for "Threep"
