= Second party =

Second party may refer to:

- party of the second part in civil litigation
- Second-party source, in a commercial transaction
- Second person singular or Second person plural, in linguistics

== See also ==
- Second-party developer, a video game developer tied to a console manufacturer by contract
- Second Party System, a US political party system operating in the 19th century
- Second person (disambiguation)
