= The Third (disambiguation) =

The Third is a Japanese media franchise.

The Third may also refer to:

- The Third (Henry Santos album), 2016
- The Third (Kitty, Daisy & Lewis album), 2015
- Her Third, a 1971 GDR film also known as The Third
- The Third, a Naruto character
- III, a generational title given to a third family member of the same name
- Shrek the Third, a 2007 animated film by DreamWorks Animation
- "The Third", a 2011 episode of The Amazing World of Gumball season 1

== See also ==
- Third (disambiguation)
- The Third Age (disambiguation)
