= Third of the month =

Recurring ordinal calendar date

The third of the month or third day of the month is the recurring calendar date position corresponding to the day numbered 3 of each month. In the Gregorian calendar (and other calendars that number days sequentially within a month), this day occurs in every month of the year, and therefore occurs twelve times per year.

- Third of January
- Third of February
- Third of March
- Third of April
- Third of May
- Third of June
- Third of July
- Third of August
- Third of September
- Third of October
- Third of November
- Third of December

In addition to these dates, this date occurs in months of many other calendars, such as the Bengali calendar and the Hebrew calendar.

== See also ==
- Third (disambiguation)
