= Second degree =

Second degree may refer to:

- A postgraduate degree or a professional degree in postgraduate education
- Second-degree burn
- Second-degree polynomial, in mathematics
- Second-degree murder, actual definition varies from country to country
- The second degree in Freemasonry

== See also ==
- First degree (disambiguation)
- Third degree (disambiguation)
- Minute and second of arc, a second of arc being 1/3600 of a degree
