= Richard Childress Racing Car No. 3 =

Iconic NASCAR racecar

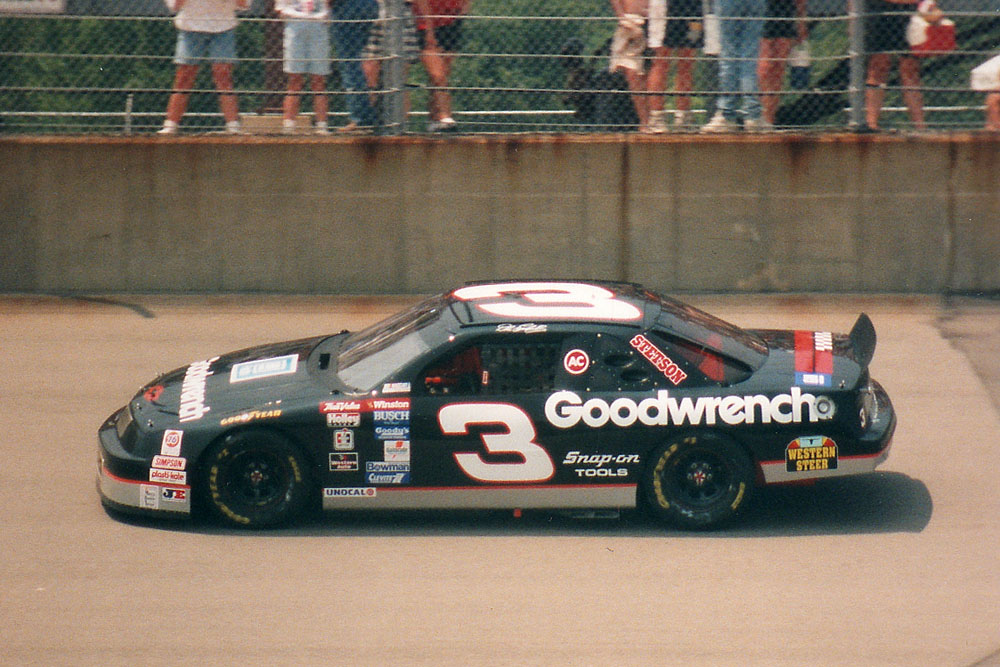
- Owner: Richard Childress
- Principal(s): Tim Brewer (1976–1977); Cliff Champion (1978); Kirk Shelmerdine (1980–1992); Andy Petree (1993–1995); David Smith (1996); Larry McReynolds (1997–1998); Kevin Hamlin (1998–2002); Gil Martin (2002–2003, 2005, 2009–2015); Wally Rogers (2004); Todd Berrier (2006–2008); Richard Labbe (2015–2017); Justin Alexander (2017–2018, 2020–2022, 2024); Danny Stockman Jr. (2019); Keith Rodden (2023–2024); Richard Boswell (2025–present)
- Base: Welcome, North Carolina
- Series: NASCAR Cup Series
- Race drivers: Richard Childress (1976–1981); Ricky Rudd (1982–1983); Dale Earnhardt (1984–2001); Kevin Harvick (2001–2013); Austin Dillon (2014–present)
- Manufacturer: Chevrolet; Oldsmobile; Pontiac
- Opened: 1976

Career
- Debut: 1976 Winston Western 500 (Riverside)
- Latest race: 2026 Season Finale 400 (Homestead)
- Drivers' Championships: Total: 6; 1986, 1987, 1990, 1991, 1993, 1994
- Race victories: 98
- Pole positions: 34

== History ==
Richard Childress (1976–1981)

RCR debuted at the 1969 Talladega 500 as a 1968 Chevrolet numbered 13. Childress himself drove the car, finishing 23rd after suffering axle problems. In 1972, the team came back to run fourteen races with Childress driving again, but didn't go full-time until 1976 when he would begin using the No. 3. Childress earned 11 Top 10 finishes and finished 11th in points that year. Over the next few years, he posted many Top 10s and twice was among the highest Top 10 points earners, but he never was in serious contention to win the championship. In 1981, he decided to end his career before the season ended, and handed his No. 3 ride to the defending Winston Cup champion, Dale Earnhardt, who brought his Wrangler sponsorship with him. By the end of 1981, Childress was in debt of $75,000 which was paid off.

Ricky Rudd (1982–1983)

After posting six Top 10's, Earnhardt left to drive for Bud Moore, and Ricky Rudd took his place for the 1982 season, with Piedmont Airlines becoming the sponsor. Rudd drove the car for both 1982 and 1983 finishing ninth in points both years, and winning twice in the latter. But after the season was over, Rudd was replaced by Earnhardt, with Wrangler back as sponsor (in perhaps an odd twist of fate, Rudd moved to Earnhardt's old ride, the No. 15 Bud Moore Engineering Wrangler-sponsored Ford Thunderbird, which actually kept its sponsorship despite Earnhardt leaving.

Dale Earnhardt (1984–2001)

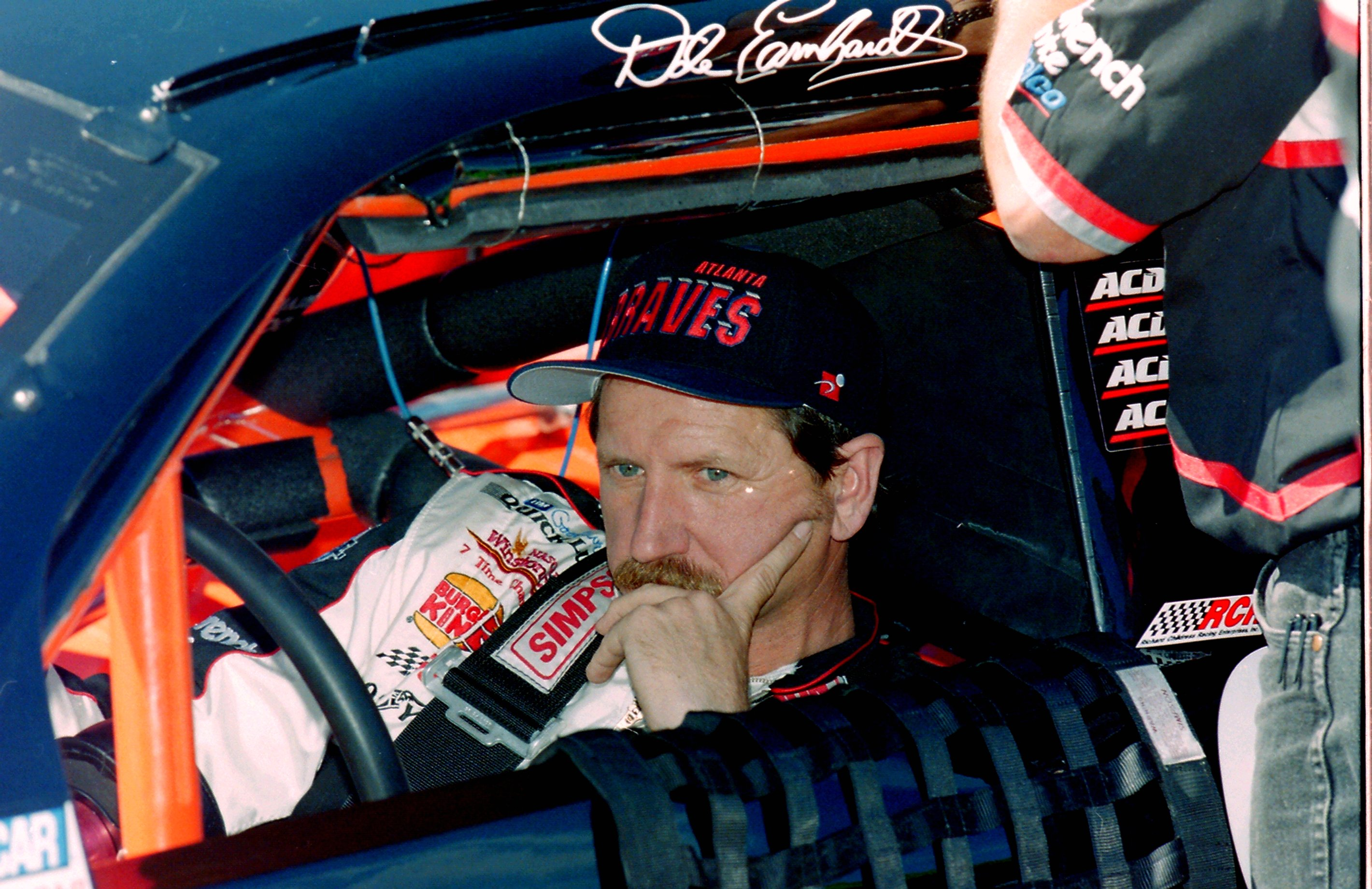
Dale Earnhardt in the No. 3 car

This time, Earnhardt was back for good. Earnhardt would dominate the Winston Cup Series from 1986 to 1994, winning six championships during those years, with crew chiefs Kirk Shelmerdine and Andy Petree, and Goodwrench replacing Wrangler as the primary sponsor after 1987. Goodwrench executives originally wanted the car to be bright blue and white, but Childress convinced the company to run a mainly-black scheme, which would later become iconic. After an injury in 1996 that almost forced Earnhardt to miss a race, Earnhardt's performance began to slow down, and went through 1997 without a victory, causing many to speculate that he was losing his edge. The next year, he won the Daytona 500, breaking a 20 race losing streak, although he had a mostly-unspectacular year other than that. The year after that one, he was able to score wins at Talladega, as well as cause more controversy, after he spun Terry Labonte out to win a race at Bristol. In 2000, he looked like he was finally regaining his old form, winning twice and finishing runner-up to Bobby Labonte in points, and his many fans hoped he was gearing up for his record-breaking 8th championship. However, this was not to be, as Earndhardt was killed by a collision in the final lap of the 2001 Daytona 500.

Kevin Harvick and the 29 (2001–2013)

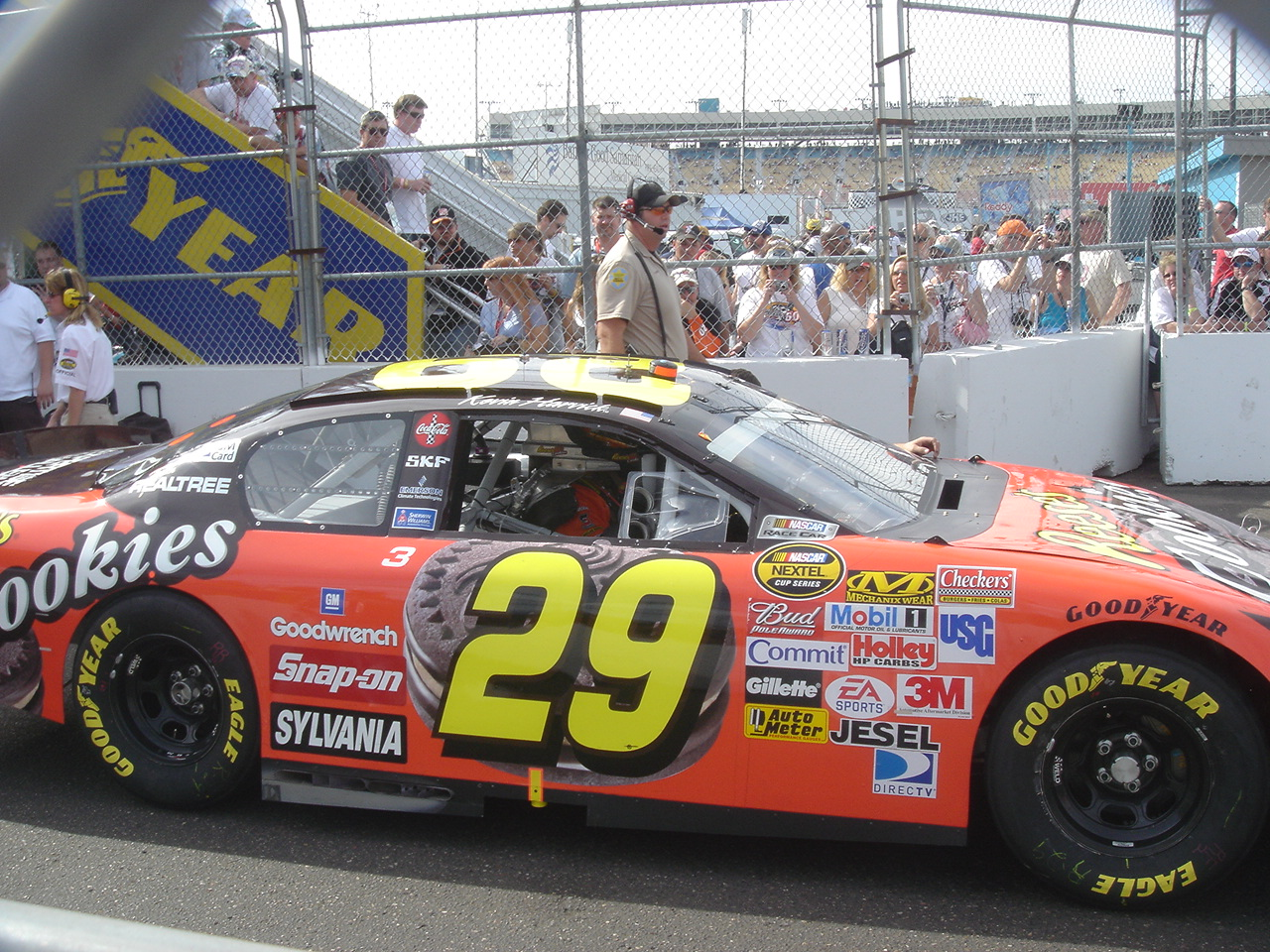
Harvick awaiting Happy Hour prior to his win at Phoenix at 2006

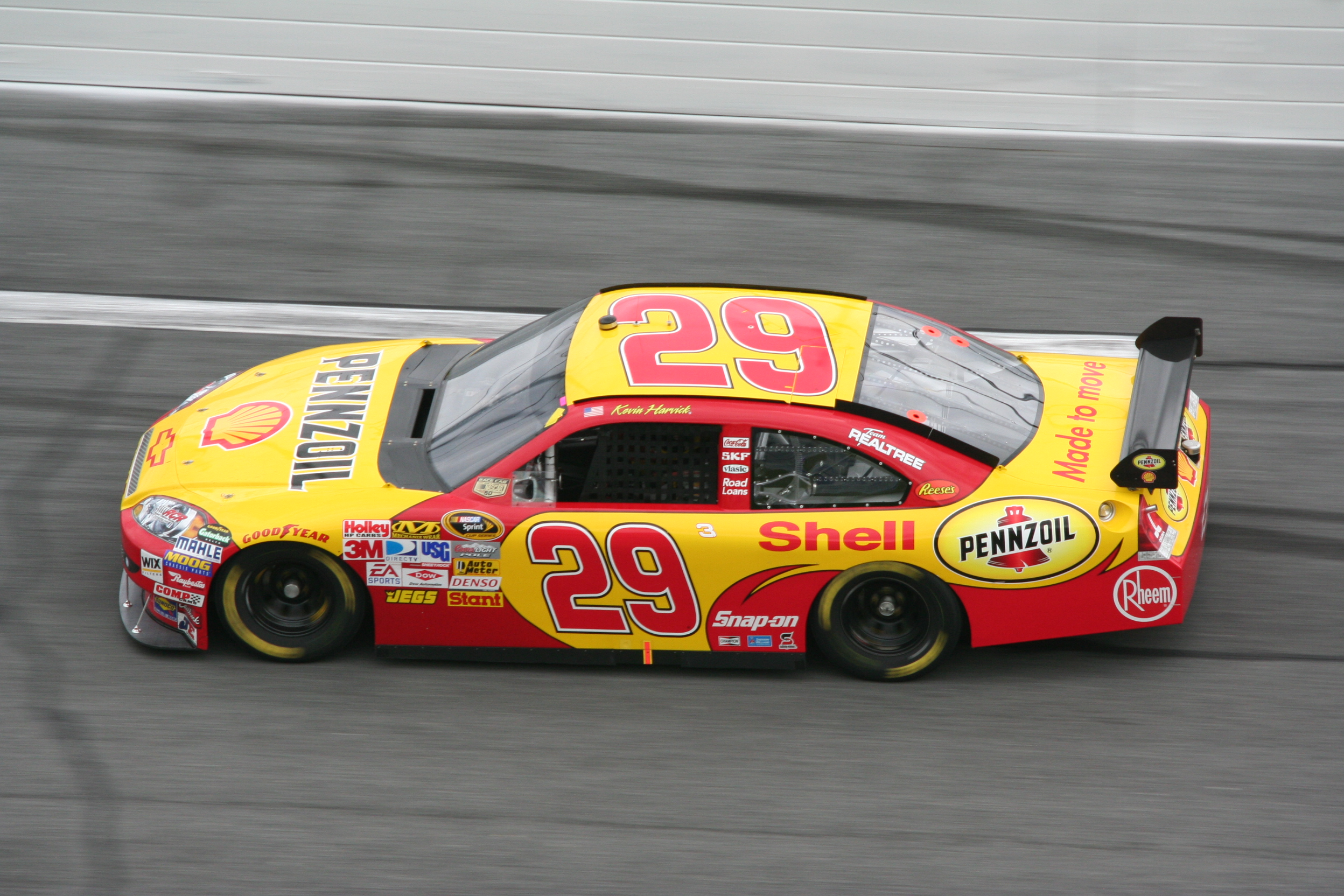
Harvick's 2008 Cup Series car

Following Dale Earnhardt's death on the last lap of the 2001 Daytona 500, Childress changed the number of the car from 3 to 29, inverted the original paint scheme, and tabbed his 25-year-old Busch Series driver Kevin Harvick to drive it. Harvick originally was scheduled to drive the No. 30 car part-time before going full-time in 2002; but the death of the seven-time Winston Cup champion rushed Harvick into the spotlight.

In just his third Winston Cup start, Harvick beat Jeff Gordon by mere inches (.006 seconds) to win the Cracker Barrel 500 at Atlanta Motor Speedway, dedicating the win to Earnhardt. After posting another win at Chicagoland Speedway and finishing in the top-ten in points (Despite missing a race), Harvick won NASCAR Winston Cup Rookie of the Year honors. In 2002, his infamous temper escalated after announcing on his radio he would intentionally wreck another driver during a Craftsman Truck Series race. Having been put on probation at the time for actions in an earlier-season race, in response, NASCAR benched Harvick for the next race, and Harvick was replaced during that time by Kenny Wallace. Since then, Harvick has won eight races, including the prestigious Brickyard 400 and Daytona 500 while scoring a (at the time) career-best points effort of 4th in both 2006 and 2008. Despite a win early in the 2005 season, 14th-place efforts in 2004 and 2005 proved to be frustrating, as Harvick threatened to leave the team if performance did not improve. A series of strong runs near the end of 2005 seemed to satisfy him, however, and he was back in the car in 2006 with Reese's as a new co-primary sponsor. After a somewhat slow start, Harvick hit his stride in April, with a string of Top 10 finishes, including a win at Phoenix. This helped RCR to be a dominant force in NASCAR again. After weeks of speculation as to where Kevin would drive starting in 2007, he and RCR announced a new three-year deal that he would drive for him until 2009. For 2007, the team had a significant change in sponsorship. GM Goodwrench would move to an associate sponsor role on the No. 29, while Shell Oil Company and Pennzoil took over the primary sponsorships. Harvick's 2007 season started out on a high note with a win in the Daytona 500 in a close finish with veteran Mark Martin. Harvick would score another win at the All-Star Race, holding off Jimmie Johnson. Harvick entered a slump during the summer, and was involved in a trackside altercation with Juan Pablo Montoya. However, Harvick and his team held off a struggling Dale Earnhardt Jr. to make the Chase for the Cup. Harvick's Chase performance would not be a repeat of 2006, and he would finish 10th in the points. Harvick improved in 2008, he did not win but did score 19 top tens, tying a career-best 4th in the final points standings as a repeat of 2006. Harvick won the 2009 Budweiser Shootout and finished second in the Daytona 500.

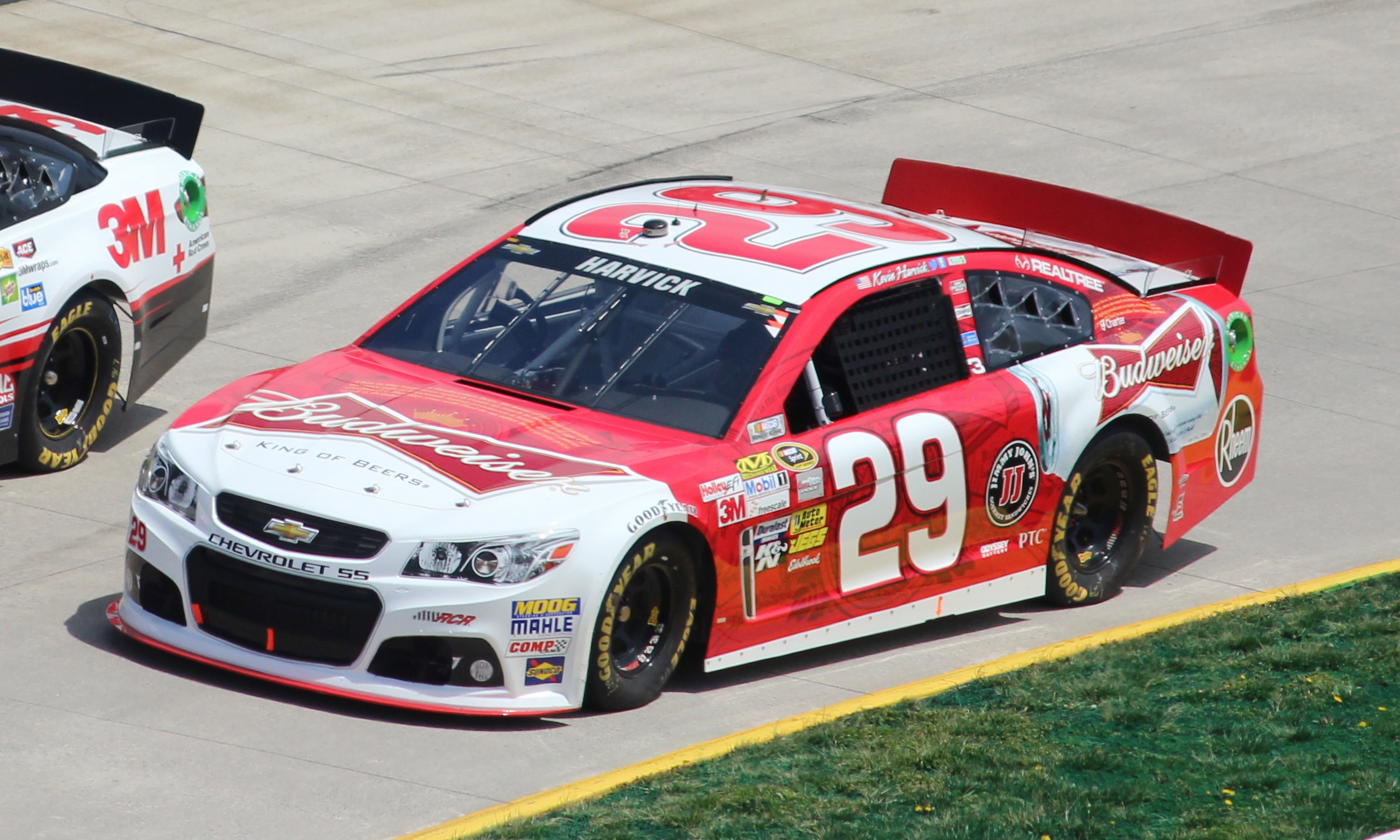
Harvick in the 2013 STP Gas Booster 500 at Martinsville Speedway.

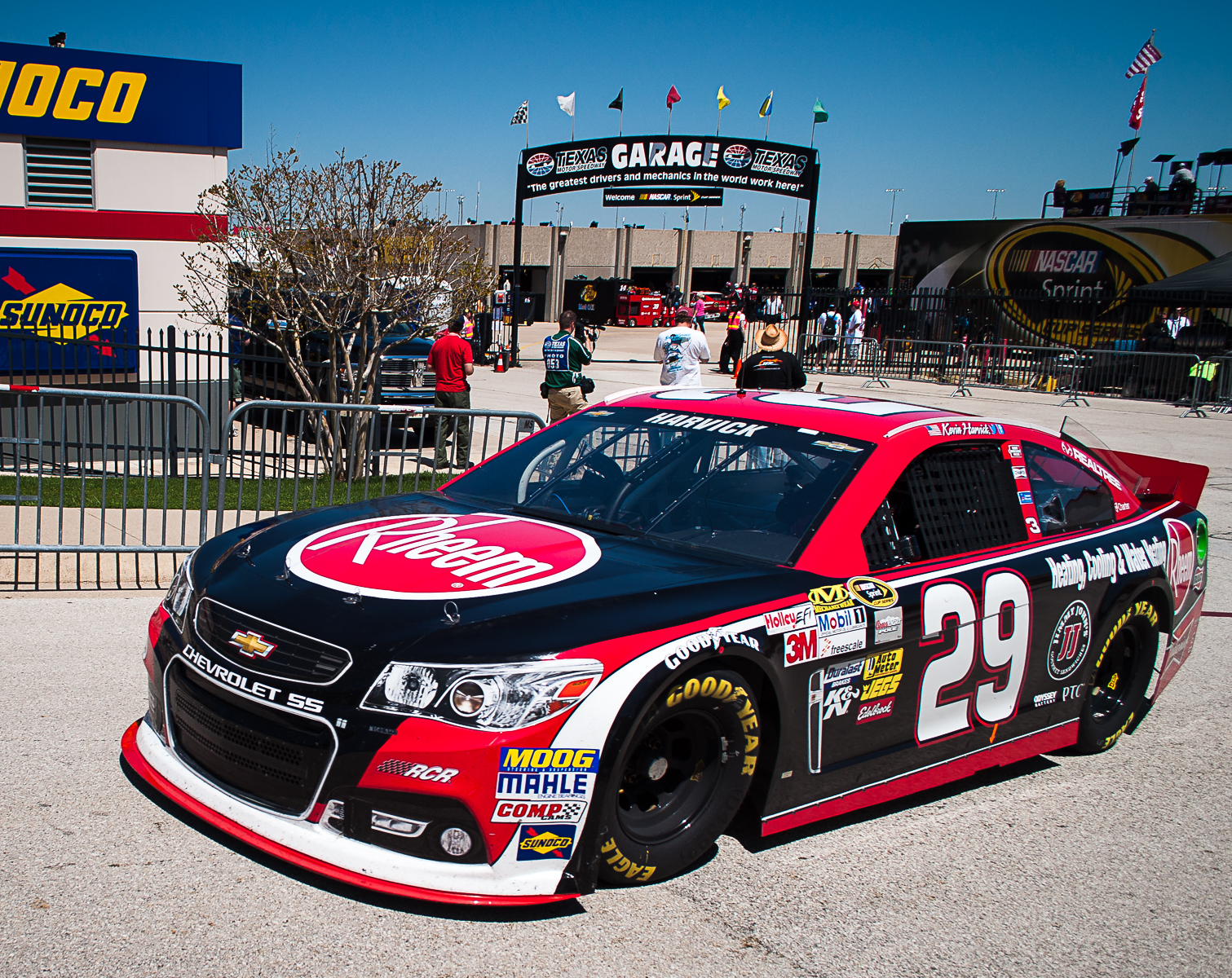
One of Harvick's final runs with RCR, in a black & red Rheem Chevy in 2013.

After not making the 2009 Chase for the Sprint Cup as well as finishing a dismal 19th in the final standings once again with no wins, it was expected that Harvick would leave RCR after his contract ended at the conclusion of the 2010 season. However, after a strong start to the 2010 season, leading the most laps at the Daytona 500, consecutive runner-ups to Jimmie Johnson at Fontana & Las Vegas, and winning the 2010 Aaron's 499 at Talladega in an epic photo-finish over Jamie McMurray (his first win since 2007), Harvick signed a multi-year extension to his RCR contract in May 2010. Harvick also went on to win the Coke Zero 400 at Daytona, Carfax 400 at Michigan, and ultimately finished third in the championship standings for the 2010 season, the highest finish of his career. The team's sponsor, Shell Oil Company and Pennzoil, left after the 2010 season and joined Penske Racing. Budweiser replaced it as the car's primary sponsor beginning in the 2011 season. Harvick and the 29 team recorded three wins early in the year at Fontana, Martinsville, and Charlotte. The team's consistency kept them near the top of the standings, and they recorded a fourth win at the 26th race in Richmond. Despite the team's Chase performance being inconsistent, Harvick would finish third in points for the second year in a row. For 2012, Harvick was reunited with Shane Wilson as his crew chief at Harvick's request. However, after struggling for most of the season, Childress reunited Harvick with Martin. Harvick won once that year with Martin at Phoenix International Raceway. Despite rumors that he would leave RCR for Stewart–Haas Racing after the 2013 season, the 29 team racked up four wins during the season, and once again finished third in points. Harvick would later announce his departure from RCR to Stewart-Haas midway through the season, taking sponsors Budweiser and Jimmy Johns with him.

Austin Dillon (2014–present)

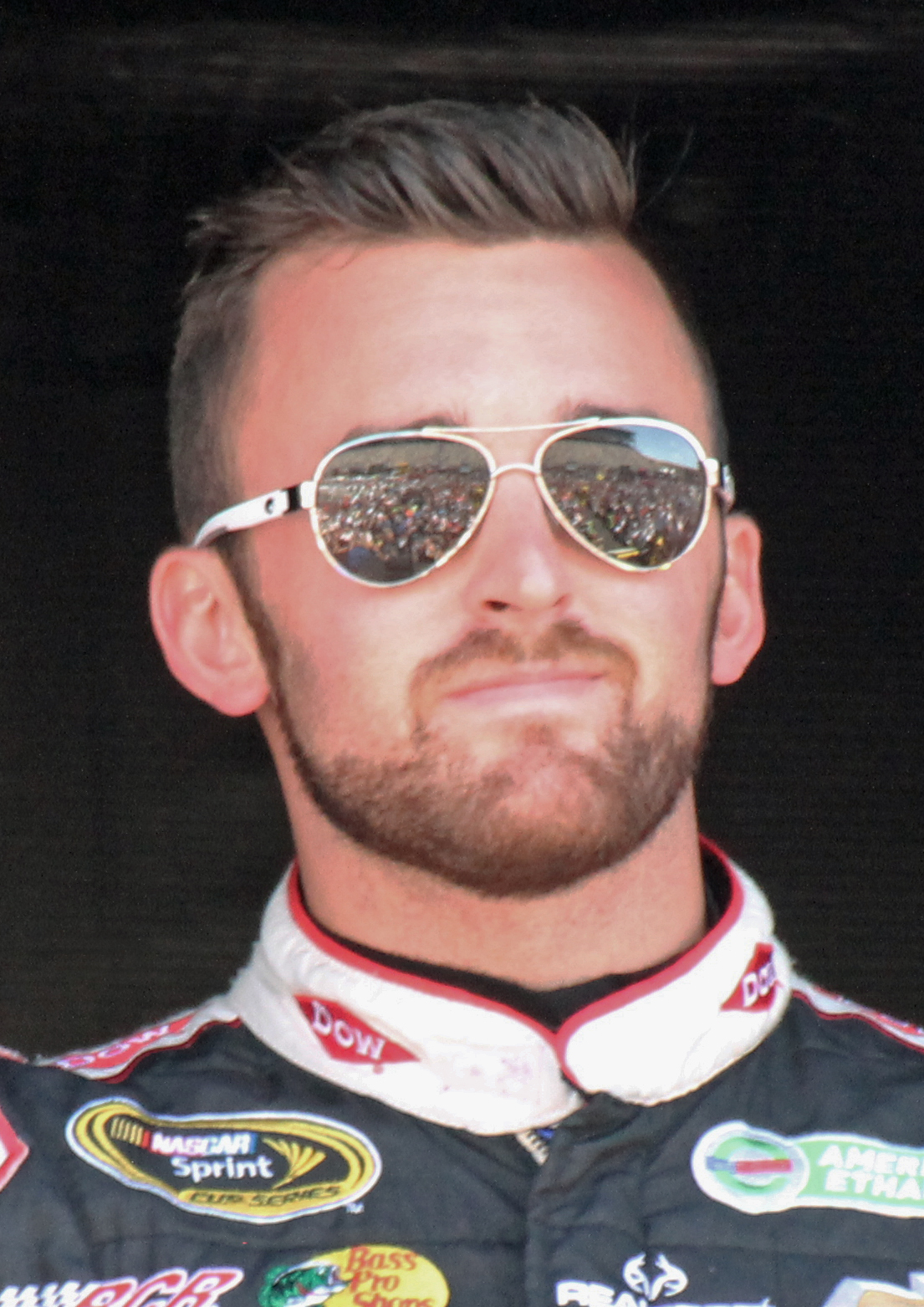
Austin Dillon (shown in 2015) took over RCR's flagship car in 2014.

On December 11, 2013, Richard Childress announced that his eldest grandson Austin Dillon would replace Harvick for 2014 and contend for Rookie of the Year honors. In addition, the car was renumbered back to the 3, which had not been used since Dale Earnhardt's death, though RCR continued to pay for the rights to the number. New sponsor Dow Chemical and existing RCR sponsors General Mills, American Ethanol, Bass Pro Shops, and Realtree, came on to fund the return of the No. 3. Austin had run the number in prior competition, including championship seasons in the Truck and Nationwide Series, as did his younger brother Ty. The transition back to 3 was met with mixed reactions, with some fans welcoming the move with open arms, and others turning their backs on RCR and even NASCAR as a whole due to accusations of disrespect towards Earnhardt's legacy, and that the number 3 should have been retired, despite the fact that Austin got blessing to drive the number from Earnhardt's children and Chocolate Myers. In addition to the return of the number 3, Austin was set to compete with what many deemed to be the strongest rookie class in the series' history, including talented youngster Kyle Larson and his runner-up for Nationwide Series ROTY Alex Bowman, Nationwide champion Justin Allgaier and Nationwide veteran Michael Annett, and former big team development drivers Parker Kligerman, Ryan Truex, and Cole Whitt. Larson and Dillon were viewed as the top contenders for the title.

Dillon opened up 2014 with a bang, winning the pole at the season opening Daytona 500, then finishing ninth in the race after avoiding serious damage in a lap 145 wreck involving 13 cars. Though his results were not spectacular (one Top 5 and four Top 10s), Dillon's results were very consistent (0 DNF's), and finishing 20th in points, losing Rookie of the Year to Kyle Larson.

In the 2015 Coke Zero 400 at Daytona on July 5, Dillon started on the outside of the front row after qualifying was rained out, and led the first eight laps. Coming to the checkered flag, Dillon was hit in the left front tire by the spinning car of Denny Hamlin, causing him to flip into the catchfence over two rows of cars. Dillon climbed out of the car unharmed, save for a bruised tailbone and a bruise on his forearm, but five fans were injured by flying debris. Dillon was credited with a seventh-place finish. Dillon ended 2015 with one Top 5 and five Top 10s, finishing 21st in points.

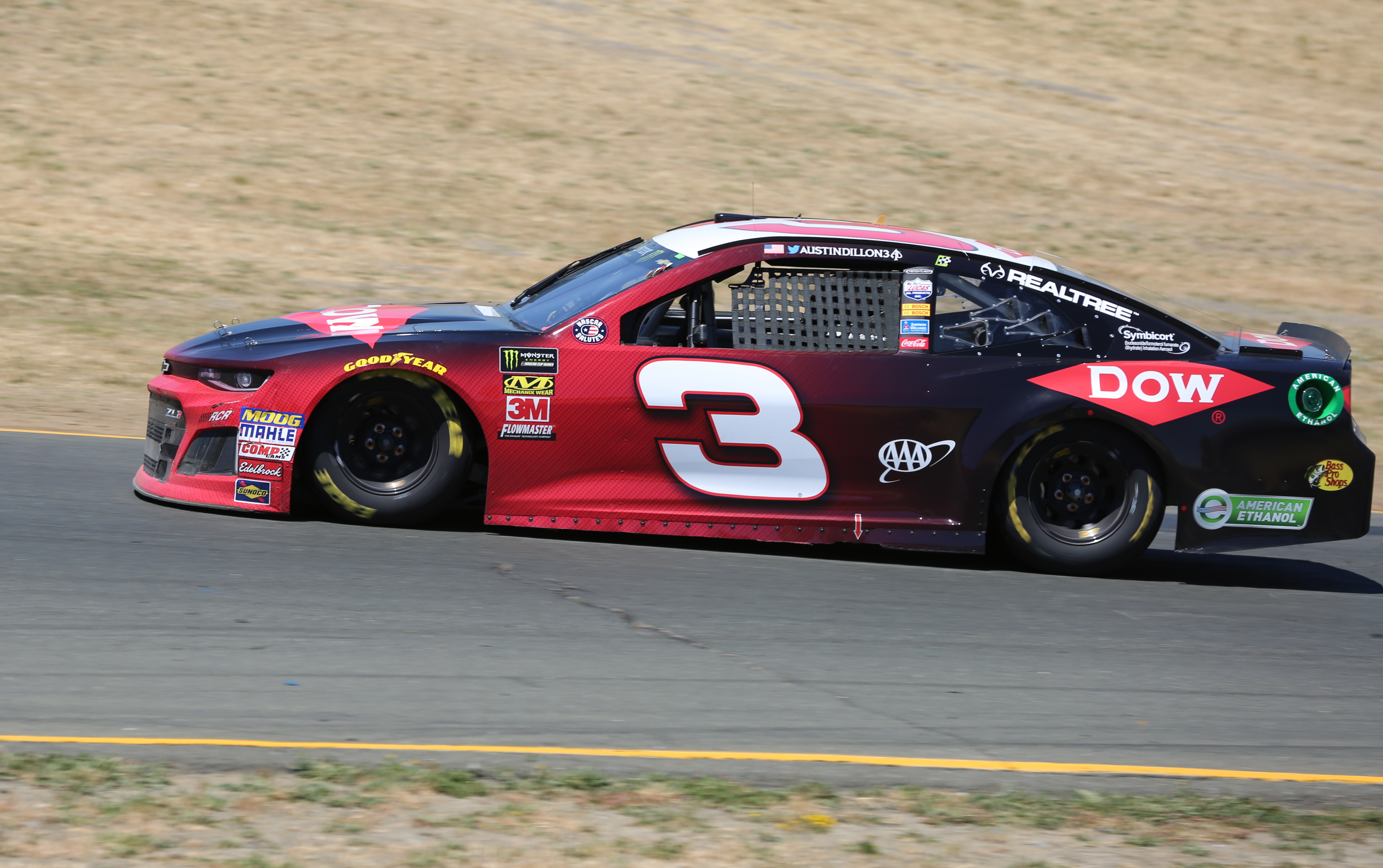
Austin Dillon in the No. 3 at Sonoma Raceway in 2018.

In 2016, Dillon showed strength out of the box when the season started, after 6 races he had two Top 5 finishes, four Top 10s, and won his second career pole at Fontana. Dillon showed speed over the first 26 races, and with so garnered career high numbers with four Top 5s and 13 Top 10s.

His first victory in the Cup Series came in the 2017 Coca-Cola 600 at Charlotte Motor Speedway after Jimmie Johnson, race leader, ran out of fuel with two laps remaining. On February 18, 2018, on the 17th anniversary of Dale Earnhardt's death, Austin Dillon charged back during overtime laps to win his first Daytona 500.

Dillon started the 2018 season by winning the Daytona 500. The win coincided with the 20th anniversary of Earnhardt's Daytona 500 win and qualified Dillon in the Playoffs. Dillon, however, struggled to stay consistent throughout the season with two Top 5s and five Top 10 finishes. He was eliminated in the Round of 16 after hitting the outside wall twice at the Charlotte Roval race and finished the season 13th in points.

Despite Danny Stockman coming atop the pit box in 2019 (as was Dillon's crew chief when he won the Truck and Nationwide championships) along with two poles at Auto Club and Talladega plus his first career stage win at Michigan, Dillon failed to make the Playoffs for the first time since 2015 as he fell outside the Top 20 in points with no wins and Top 5s. On October 28, 2019, Stockman announced he would step down as the crew chief of the No. 3 team at the end of the 2019 season. Justin Alexander returned as the No. 3 team's crew chief in 2020 after having served that position in the 2017 and 2018 seasons.

The 2020 season for Dillon and the No. 3 team was an improvement over the previous season. At Las Vegas, Dillon scored his first top-5 in nearly two years by finishing 4th. On July 19, 2020, Dillon broke an 88-race winless streak by claiming his 3rd career victory at the 2020 O'Reilly Auto Parts 500 at Texas Motor Speedway. As a result, Dillon and the No. 3 team qualified for the Playoffs for the first time since the 2018 season as well as the 2021 NASCAR All-Star Race. RCR teammate Tyler Reddick also finished in 2nd-place to mark an RCR 1-2 finish for the first time since the 2011 Good Sam Club 500. On August 15, it was announced that Dillon tested positive for COVID-19, forcing him to miss the 2020 Go Bowling 235 at Daytona. Kaz Grala was announced as his replacement for the race. Grala finished 7th-place in his Cup debut. Dillon returned to racing with the team the following week at Dover. He began the playoffs with strong second and fourth-place finishes at Darlington and Richmond, respectively. However, a 32nd place finish at Las Vegas and mediocore top-20 finishes at Talladega and Charlotte Roval resulted in his elimination after the Round of 12. Dillon finished the season 11th in points, his highest since 2017.

Dillon began the 2021 season with a third-place finish at the 2021 Daytona 500, but poor finishes at the Daytona road course, Indianapolis, and Michigan, along with the lack of a win, prevented him from making the playoffs. Dillon finished the season 17th in points.

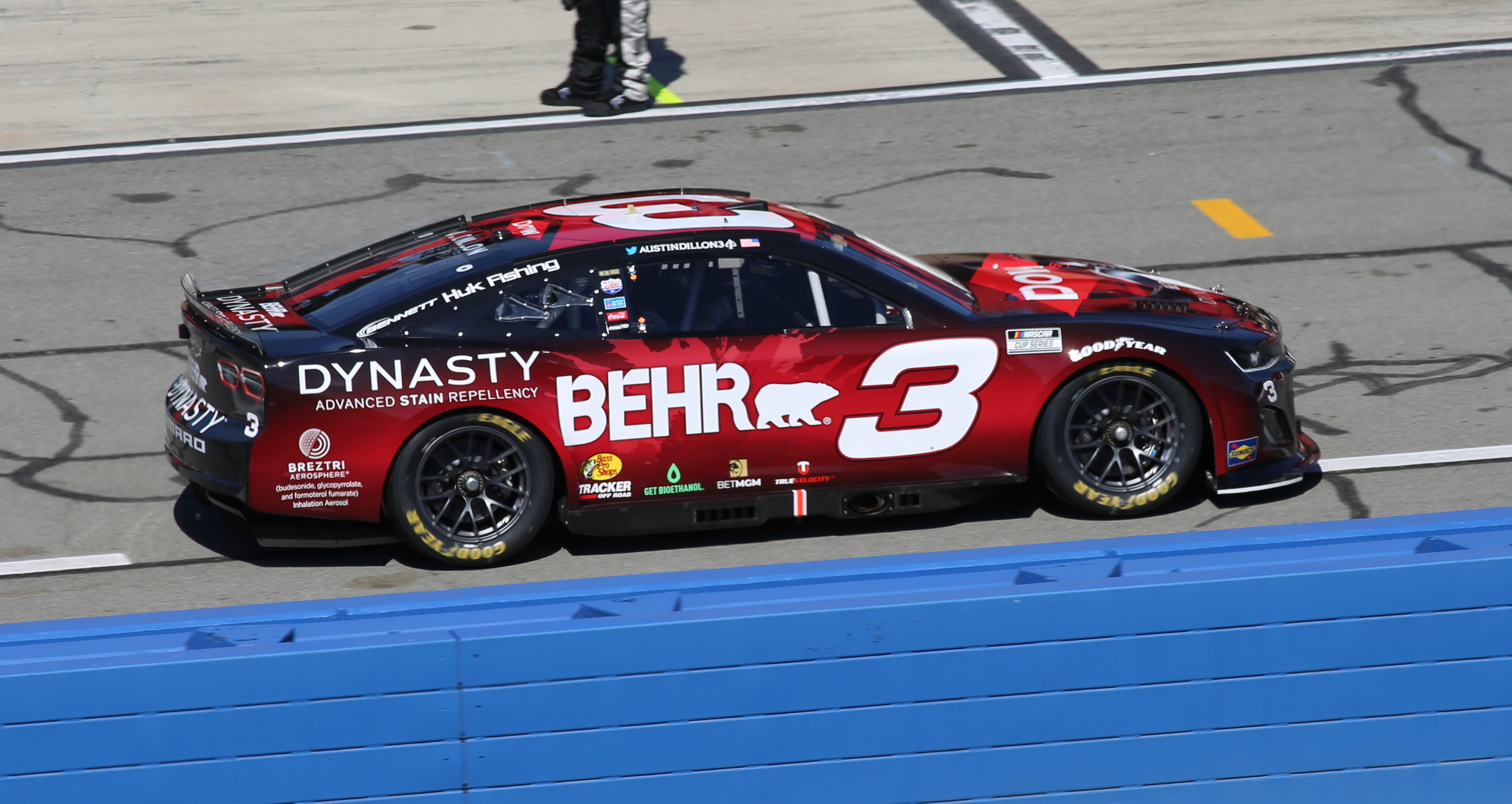
Austin Dillon in the No. 3 at Auto Club in 2022.

Dillon began the 2022 season with a 25th place finish at the 2022 Daytona 500. He followed it up with three top-fives and seven top-10 finishes before winning at the 2022 Coke Zero Sugar 400 at Daytona to take the final slot in the playoffs. Dillon was eliminated in the Round of 16 after being involved in a multi-car pileup at the Bristol night race.

On October 28, 2022, RCR announced that Keith Rodden would be on the pit box for Dillon starting in 2023. Alexander announced shortly before this announcement that he would be stepping down from the crew chief role on the No. 3 car. Dillon started the season with a 33rd place DNF at the 2023 Daytona 500. Following the Martinsville race, the No. 3 was served an L1 penalty after NASCAR's R&D Center discovered an unapproved underwing assembly during post-inspection. As a result, the team was docked 60 driver and owner points and five playoff points. In addition, Rodden was fined US$75,000 and suspended for two races.

During the 2024 season, Alexander returned as crew chief starting at the Martinsville spring race. At the Richmond summer race, Dillon broke an 68-race winless drought after spinning out Joey Logano and Denny Hamlin on the final lap. Three days later, it was announced that NASCAR had encumbered the win, docked Dillon 25 driver points and stripped him of his playoff eligibility. Following the Martinsville playoff race, the No. 3 was docked 50 owner and driver points and Dillon and the team were each fined US$100,000 for race manipulation, when Dillon and fellow Chevrolet driver Ross Chastain formed a blockade to allow William Byron to make the Championship 4. In addition, Alexander was suspended for the Phoenix finale.

On November 20, 2024, RCR signed Richard Boswell as the crew chief of the No. 3 car, replacing Alexander for the 2025 season. Dillon started the season with a 23rd-place finish at the 2025 Daytona 500. He later scored three consecutive top-ten finishes at Bristol, Talladega, and Texas. After struggling throughout the season, he broke through and won Richmond, this time without controversy, right before the playoffs started.

== Results ==
Year	Driver	No.	Make	1	2	3	4	5	6	7	8	9	10	11	12	13	14	15	16	17	18	19	20	21	22	23	24	25	26	27	28	29	30	31	32	33	34	35	36	Owners	Pts
1976	Richard Childress	3	Chevy	RSD; 7	DAY; 9	CAR; 23	RCH; 6	BRI; 20	ATL; 11	NWS; 9	DAR; 9	MAR; 8	TAL; 24	NSV; 17	DOV; 10	CLT; 17	RSD; 11	MCH; 18	DAY; 12	NSV; 28	POC; 9	TAL; 8	MCH; 13	BRI; 10	DAR; 36	RCH; 25	DOV; 20	MAR; 10	NWS; 23	CLT; 15	CAR; 27	ATL; 25	ONT; 36							11th	3428
1977	Richard Childress	3	Chevy	RSD; 6	DAY; 23	RCH; 10	CAR; 17	ATL; 19	NWS; 8	DAR; 17	BRI; 8	MAR; 10	TAL; 21	NSV; 26	DOV; 21	CLT; 14	RSD; 8	MCH; 34	DAY; 19	NSV; 27	POC; 17	TAL; 20	MCH; 33	BRI; 8	DAR; 8	RCH; 26	DOV; 7	MAR; 15	NWS; 6	CLT; 16	CAR; 18	ATL; 21	ONT; 10							9th	3463
1978	Richard Childress	3	Chevy	RSD; 20		RCH; 8	CAR; 8																		DAR; 27															10th	3566
1978	Richard Childress	3	Olds		DAY; 13			ATL; 15	BRI; 6	DAR; 28	NWS; 10	MAR; 8	TAL; 9	DOV; 33	CLT; 20	NSV; 8	RSD; 15	MCH; 10	DAY; 24	NSV; 3	POC; 24	TAL; 25	MCH; 31	BRI; 7		RCH; 11	DOV; 12	MAR; 12	NWS; 14	CLT; 9	CAR; 10	ATL; 30	ONT; 11							10th	3566
1979	Richard Childress	3	Olds	RSD; 15	DAY; 17			ATL; 20					TAL; 24			CLT; 10	TWS; 7	RSD; 6	MCH; 23	DAY; 37			TAL; 10	MCH; 10																8th	3735
1979	Richard Childress	3	Chevy			CAR; 5	RCH; 26		NWS; 7	BRI; 11	DAR; 16	MAR; 14		NSV; 6	DOV; 29						NSV; 7	POC; 12			BRI; 11	DAR; 29	RCH; 15	DOV; 13	MAR; 13	CLT; 14	NWS; 10	CAR; 7	ATL; 15	ONT; 16						8th	3735
1980	Richard Childress	3	Chevy	RSD; 6			CAR; 14				NWS; 11	MAR; 11		NSV; 29	DOV; 8		TWS; 6	RSD; 18	MCH; 14		NSV; 9	POC; 9		MCH; 27	BRI; 9	DAR; 12	RCH; 11	DOV; 37	NWS; 19	MAR; 25	CLT; 11	CAR; 7	ATL; 9	ONT; 21						10th	3742
1980	Richard Childress	3	Olds		DAY; 13	RCH; 22		ATL; 13	BRI; 29	DAR; 21			TAL; 12			CLT; 11				DAY; 8			TAL; 6																	10th	3742
1981	Richard Childress	3	Chevy	RSD; 4																																				19th	3043
1981	Richard Childress	3	Pontiac		DAY; 38	RCH; 13	CAR; 22	ATL; 17	BRI; 16	NWS; 17	DAR; 31	MAR; 22	TAL; 13	NSV; 13	DOV; 17	CLT; 19	TWS; 14	RSD; 18	MCH; 19	DAY; 21	NSV; 17	POC; 23	TAL; 26																	19th	3043
1981	Dale Earnhardt	3	Pontiac																					MCH; 9	BRI; 27	DAR; 6	RCH; 6	DOV; 15	MAR; 26	NWS; 4	CLT; 25	CAR; 9	ATL; 24	RSD; 4						19th	3043
1982	Ricky Rudd	3	Pontiac	DAY; 35	RCH; 22	BRI; 27	ATL; 25	CAR; 15	DAR; 29	NWS; 9	MAR; 4	TAL; 24	NSV; 19	DOV; 22	CLT; 7	POC; 6	RSD; 29	MCH; 5	DAY; 7	NSV; 4	POC; 31	TAL; 9	MCH; 14	BRI; 7	DAR; 31	RCH; 4	DOV; 11	NWS; 25	CLT; 31	MAR; 2	CAR; 28	ATL; 7	RSD; 2							9th	3537
1983	Ricky Rudd	3	Chevy	DAY; 24	RCH; 28	CAR; 6	ATL; 10	DAR; 4	NWS; 27	MAR; 5	TAL; 8	NSV; 14	DOV; 24	BRI; 26	CLT; 32	RSD; 1*	POC; 31	MCH; 6	DAY; 21	NSV; 5	POC; 7	TAL; 16	MCH; 27	BRI; 14	DAR; 25	RCH; 2	DOV; 13	MAR; 1*	NWS; 6	CLT; 9	CAR; 3	ATL; 26	RSD; 37							9th	3693
1984	Dale Earnhardt	3	Chevy	DAY; 2	RCH; 6	CAR; 14	ATL; 2	BRI; 7	NWS; 8	DAR; 5	MAR; 9	TAL; 27	NSV; 19	DOV; 5	CLT; 2	RSD; 5	POC; 8	MCH; 2	DAY; 8	NSV; 3	POC; 10	TAL; 1	MCH; 7	BRI; 10	DAR; 38	RCH; 3	DOV; 5	MAR; 12	CLT; 39	NWS; 7	CAR; 13	ATL; 1	RSD; 11							4th	4265
1985	Dale Earnhardt	3	Chevy	DAY; 32	RCH; 1	CAR; 10	ATL; 9	BRI; 1*	DAR; 24	NWS; 8	MAR; 25	TAL; 21	DOV; 25	CLT; 4*	RSD; 40	POC; 39	MCH; 5	DAY; 9	POC; 39	TAL; 24	MCH; 22	BRI; 1*	DAR; 19*	RCH; 4	DOV; 7	MAR; 1	NWS; 4	CLT; 20	CAR; 8	ATL; 4	RSD; 5									8th	3561
1986	Dale Earnhardt	3	Chevy	DAY; 14	RCH; 3*	CAR; 8	ATL; 2*	BRI; 10	DAR; 1*	NWS; 1*	MAR; 21	TAL; 2	DOV; 3	CLT; 1	RSD; 5	POC; 2	MCH; 6	DAY; 27*	POC; 7	TAL; 26*	GLN; 3	MCH; 5	BRI; 4	DAR; 9	RCH; 2	DOV; 21	MAR; 12	NWS; 9	CLT; 1	CAR; 6	ATL; 1*	RSD; 2								1st	4468
1987	Dale Earnhardt	3	Chevy	DAY; 5	CAR; 1*	RCH; 1*	ATL; 16*	DAR; 1*	NWS; 1*	BRI; 1	MAR; 1*	TAL; 4	CLT; 20	DOV; 4	POC; 5	RSD; 7	MCH; 1*	DAY; 6	POC; 1*	TAL; 3	GLN; 8	MCH; 2*	BRI; 1*	DAR; 1*	RCH; 1*	DOV; 31	MAR; 2*	NWS; 2	CLT; 12	CAR; 2	RSD; 30	ATL; 2								1st	4696
1988	Dale Earnhardt	3	Chevy	DAY; 10	RCH; 10*	CAR; 5	ATL; 1*	DAR; 11	BRI; 14	NWS; 3*	MAR; 1*	TAL; 9	CLT; 13	DOV; 16	RSD; 4	POC; 33	MCH; 4	DAY; 4*	POC; 11	TAL; 3	GLN; 6	MCH; 29	BRI; 1*	DAR; 3	RCH; 2	DOV; 2	MAR; 8	CLT; 17*	NWS; 6	CAR; 5	PHO; 11	ATL; 14								3rd	4256
1989	Dale Earnhardt	3	Chevy	DAY; 3	CAR; 3	ATL; 2	RCH; 3	DAR; 33	BRI; 16	NWS; 1*	MAR; 2	TAL; 8	CLT; 38	DOV; 1*	SON; 4	POC; 3	MCH; 17	DAY; 18	POC; 9	TAL; 11	GLN; 3	MCH; 17	BRI; 14	DAR; 1*	RCH; 2	DOV; 1*	MAR; 9	CLT; 42	NWS; 10*	CAR; 20	PHO; 6	ATL; 1*								2nd	4164
1990	Dale Earnhardt	3	Chevy	DAY; 5*	RCH; 2	CAR; 10	ATL; 1*	DAR; 1	BRI; 19	NWS; 3	MAR; 5	TAL; 1*	CLT; 30	DOV; 31	SON; 34	POC; 13	MCH; 1	DAY; 1*	POC; 4	TAL; 1*	GLN; 7	MCH; 8	BRI; 8*	DAR; 1*	RCH; 1*	DOV; 3	MAR; 2	NWS; 2*	CLT; 25	CAR; 10	PHO; 1*	ATL; 3								1st	4430
1991	Dale Earnhardt	3	Chevy	DAY; 5	RCH; 1	CAR; 8	ATL; 3	DAR; 29	BRI; 20	NWS; 2	MAR; 1*	TAL; 3*	CLT; 3	DOV; 2*	SON; 7	POC; 2	MCH; 4	DAY; 7	POC; 22	TAL; 1*	GLN; 15	MCH; 24	BRI; 7	DAR; 8	RCH; 11	DOV; 15	MAR; 3	NWS; 1	CLT; 25	CAR; 7	PHO; 9	ATL; 5								1st	4287
1992	Dale Earnhardt	3	Chevy	DAY; 9	CAR; 24	RCH; 11	ATL; 3	DAR; 10	BRI; 18	NWS; 6	MAR; 9	TAL; 3	CLT; 1	DOV; 2	SON; 6	POC; 28	MCH; 9	DAY; 40	POC; 23	TAL; 40	GLN; 9	MCH; 16	BRI; 2	DAR; 29	RCH; 4	DOV; 21	MAR; 31	NWS; 19	CLT; 14	CAR; 8	PHO; 10	ATL; 26								12th	3574
1993	Dale Earnhardt	3	Chevy	DAY; 2*	CAR; 2	RCH; 10	ATL; 11	DAR; 1*	BRI; 2	NWS; 16	MAR; 22	TAL; 4*	SON; 6*	CLT; 1*	DOV; 1*	POC; 11	MCH; 14	DAY; 1*	NHA; 26	POC; 1*	TAL; 1*	GLN; 18	MCH; 9	BRI; 3	DAR; 4	RCH; 3	DOV; 27	MAR; 29	NWS; 2	CLT; 3	CAR; 2	PHO; 4	ATL; 10							1st	4526
1994	Dale Earnhardt	3	Chevy	DAY; 7	CAR; 7	RCH; 4	ATL; 12	DAR; 1*	BRI; 1*	NWS; 5	MAR; 11	TAL; 1	SON; 3	CLT; 9	DOV; 28	POC; 2	MCH; 2	DAY; 3	NHA; 2	POC; 7	TAL; 34	IND; 5	GLN; 3	MCH; 37	BRI; 3	DAR; 2	RCH; 3	DOV; 2	MAR; 2	NWS; 7	CLT; 3	CAR; 1*	PHO; 40	ATL; 2						1st	4694
1995	Dale Earnhardt	3	Chevy	DAY; 2	CAR; 3	RCH; 2	ATL; 4	DAR; 2	BRI; 25	NWS; 1*	MAR; 29	TAL; 21	SON; 1	CLT; 6	DOV; 5	POC; 8	MCH; 35	DAY; 3	NHA; 22	POC; 20	TAL; 3	IND; 1	GLN; 23	MCH; 35	BRI; 2	DAR; 2*	RCH; 3	DOV; 5	MAR; 1*	NWS; 9	CLT; 2	CAR; 7	PHO; 3	ATL; 1*						2nd	4580
1996	Dale Earnhardt	3	Chevy	DAY; 2	CAR; 1	RCH; 31	ATL; 1*	DAR; 14	BRI; 4	NWS; 3	MAR; 5	TAL; 3	SON; 4	CLT; 2	DOV; 3	POC; 32	MCH; 9	DAY; 4	NHA; 12	POC; 14	TAL; 28*	IND; 15	GLN; 6*	MCH; 17	BRI; 24	DAR; 12	RCH; 20	DOV; 16	MAR; 15	NWS; 2	CLT; 6	CAR; 9	PHO; 12	ATL; 4						4th	4327
1997	Dale Earnhardt	3	Chevy	DAY; 31	CAR; 11	RCH; 25	ATL; 8	DAR; 15	TEX; 6	BRI; 6	MAR; 12	SON; 12	TAL; 2*	CLT; 7	DOV; 16	POC; 10	MCH; 7	CAL; 16	DAY; 4	NHA; 2	POC; 12	IND; 29	GLN; 16	MCH; 9	BRI; 14	DAR; 30	RCH; 15	NHA; 8	DOV; 2	MAR; 2	CLT; 3	TAL; 29	CAR; 8	PHO; 5	ATL; 16					5th	4216
1998	Dale Earnhardt	3	Chevy	DAY; 1*	CAR; 17	LVS; 8	ATL; 13	DAR; 12	BRI; 22	TEX; 35	MAR; 4	TAL; 36	CAL; 9	CLT; 39	DOV; 25	RCH; 21	MCH; 15	POC; 8	SON; 11	NHA; 18	POC; 7	IND; 5	GLN; 11	MCH; 18	BRI; 6	NHA; 9	DAR; 4	RCH; 38	DOV; 23	MAR; 22	CLT; 29	TAL; 32	DAY; 10	PHO; 3	CAR; 9	ATL; 13				8th	3928
1999	Dale Earnhardt	3	Chevy	DAY; 2	CAR; 41	LVS; 7	ATL; 40	DAR; 25	TEX; 8	BRI; 10	MAR; 19	TAL; 1*	CAL; 12	RCH; 8	CLT; 6	DOV; 11	MCH; 16	POC; 7	SON; 9	DAY; 2	NHA; 8	POC; 9	IND; 10	GLN; 20	MCH; 5	BRI; 1	DAR; 22	RCH; 6	NHA; 13	DOV; 8	MAR; 2	CLT; 12	TAL; 1	CAR; 40	PHO; 11	HOM; 8	ATL; 9			7th	4492
2000	Dale Earnhardt	3	Chevy	DAY; 21	CAR; 2	LVS; 8	ATL; 1	DAR; 3	BRI; 39	TEX; 7	MAR; 9	TAL; 3	CAL; 17	RCH; 10	CLT; 3	DOV; 6	MCH; 2	POC; 4	SON; 6	DAY; 8	NHA; 6	POC; 25	IND; 8	GLN; 25	MCH; 6	BRI; 4	DAR; 3	RCH; 2	NHA; 12	DOV; 17	MAR; 2	CLT; 11	TAL; 1	CAR; 17	PHO; 9	HOM; 20	ATL; 2			2nd	4865
2001	Dale Earnhardt	3	Chevy	DAY; 12																																				9th	4406
2001	Kevin Harvick	29	Chevy		CAR; 14	LVS; 8	ATL; 1	DAR; 14	BRI; 24*	TEX; 7	MAR; 34	TAL; 12	CAL; 25	RCH; 17	CLT; 2	DOV; 8	MCH; 10	POC; 15	SON; 14	DAY; 25	CHI; 1*	NHA; 8	POC; 20	IND; 11	GLN; 7	MCH; 41	BRI; 2	DAR; 8	RCH; 2	DOV; 6	KAN; 16	CLT; 8	MAR; 22	TAL; 32	PHO; 17	CAR; 27	HOM; 7	ATL; 3	NHA; 26	9th	4406
2002	Kevin Harvick	29	Chevy	DAY; 36	CAR; 19	LVS; 25	ATL; 39	DAR; 3	BRI; 10	TEX; 25		TAL; 28	CAL; 35	RCH; 40	CLT; 34	DOV; 28	POC; 39	MCH; 27	SON; 14	DAY; 11	CHI; 1	NHA; 9	POC; 6	IND; 5	GLN; 14	MCH; 3	BRI; 4	DAR; 40	RCH; 18	NHA; 33	DOV; 30	KAN; 11	TAL; 27	CLT; 22	MAR; 31	ATL; 40	CAR; 26	PHO; 17	HOM; 20	21st	3501
2002	Kenny Wallace	29	Chevy								MAR; 32																													21st	3501
2003	Kevin Harvick	29	Chevy	DAY; 4	CAR; 25	LVS; 13	ATL; 19	DAR; 36	BRI; 7	TEX; 15	TAL; 2	MAR; 16	CAL; 29	RCH; 6	CLT; 13	DOV; 27	POC; 25	MCH; 18	SON; 3	DAY; 9*	CHI; 17	NHA; 2	POC; 12	IND; 1	GLN; 5	MCH; 2	BRI; 2	DAR; 2	RCH; 16	NHA; 13	DOV; 4*	TAL; 7	KAN; 6	CLT; 10	MAR; 7	ATL; 20	PHO; 34	CAR; 15	HOM; 2	5th	4770
2004	Kevin Harvick	29	Chevy	DAY; 4	CAR; 13	LVS; 21	ATL; 32	DAR; 8	BRI; 3	TEX; 13	MAR; 19	TAL; 3	CAL; 9	RCH; 25	CLT; 23	DOV; 10	POC; 20	MCH; 17	SON; 12	DAY; 14	CHI; 10	NHA; 13	POC; 32	IND; 8	GLN; 6	MCH; 16	BRI; 24	CAL; 28	RCH; 12	NHA; 10	DOV; 19	TAL; 2	KAN; 35	CLT; 36	MAR; 8	ATL; 35	PHO; 4	DAR; 32	HOM; 10	14th	4228
2005	Kevin Harvick	29	Chevy	DAY; 28	CAL; 6	LVS; 5	ATL; 21	BRI; 1	MAR; 32	TEX; 13	PHO; 19	TAL; 12	DAR; 14	RCH; 5	CLT; 14	DOV; 25	POC; 8	MCH; 25	SON; 37	DAY; 24	CHI; 19	NHA; 22	POC; 6	IND; 19	GLN; 15	MCH; 22	BRI; 37	CAL; 14	RCH; 10	NHA; 10	DOV; 19	TAL; 10	KAN; 24	CLT; 28	MAR; 15	ATL; 22	TEX; 16	PHO; 23	HOM; 8	14th	4072
2006	Kevin Harvick	29	Chevy	DAY; 14	CAL; 29	LVS; 11	ATL; 39	BRI; 2	MAR; 7	TEX; 5	PHO; 1	TAL; 23	RCH; 3*	DAR; 37	CLT; 34	DOV; 3	POC; 13	MCH; 10	SON; 24	DAY; 9	CHI; 4	NHA; 5	POC; 5	IND; 3	GLN; 1	MCH; 11	BRI; 11	CAL; 15	RCH; 1	NHA; 1*	DOV; 32	KAN; 15	TAL; 6	CLT; 18	MAR; 9	ATL; 31	TEX; 3	PHO; 1*	HOM; 5	4th	6397
2007	Kevin Harvick	29	Chevy	DAY; 1	CAL; 17	LVS; 27	ATL; 25	BRI; 4	MAR; 41	TEX; 29	PHO; 10	TAL; 6	RCH; 7	DAR; 17	CLT; 21	DOV; 20	POC; 11	MCH; 7	SON; 2	NHA; 8	DAY; 34	CHI; 4	IND; 7	POC; 17	GLN; 36	MCH; 15	BRI; 16	CAL; 14	RCH; 7	NHA; 17	DOV; 20	KAN; 6	TAL; 20	CLT; 33	MAR; 10	ATL; 15	TEX; 10	PHO; 6	HOM; 19	10th	6199
2008	Kevin Harvick	29	Chevy	DAY; 14	CAL; 8	LVS; 4	ATL; 7	BRI; 2	MAR; 12	TEX; 11	PHO; 19	TAL; 24	RCH; 8	DAR; 39	CLT; 14	DOV; 38	POC; 13	MCH; 12	SON; 30	NHA; 14	DAY; 12	CHI; 3	IND; 37	POC; 4	GLN; 6	MCH; 8	BRI; 4	CAL; 4	RCH; 7	NHA; 10	DOV; 6	KAN; 6	TAL; 20	CLT; 13	MAR; 7	ATL; 13	TEX; 7	PHO; 7	HOM; 2	4th	6408
2009	Kevin Harvick	29	Chevy	DAY; 2	CAL; 38	LVS; 12	ATL; 4	BRI; 30	MAR; 11	TEX; 27	PHO; 30	TAL; 38	RCH; 34	DAR; 11	CLT; 31	DOV; 17	POC; 24	MCH; 18	SON; 29	NHA; 34	DAY; 26	CHI; 19	IND; 6	POC; 12	GLN; 35	MCH; 12	BRI; 38	ATL; 2	RCH; 9	NHA; 32	DOV; 12	KAN; 24	CAL; 10	CLT; 18	MAR; 10	TAL; 21	TEX; 5	PHO; 24	HOM; 3	19th	3796
2010	Kevin Harvick	29	Chevy	DAY; 7*	CAL; 2	LVS; 2	ATL; 9	BRI; 11	MAR; 35	PHO; 13	TEX; 7	TAL; 1	RCH; 3	DAR; 6	DOV; 7	CLT; 11	POC; 4	MCH; 19	SON; 3	NHA; 5	DAY; 1*	CHI; 34	IND; 2	POC; 4	GLN; 11	MCH; 1	BRI; 14	ATL; 33	RCH; 9	NHA; 5	DOV; 15	KAN; 3	CAL; 7	CLT; 8	MAR; 3	TAL; 2	TEX; 6	PHO; 6	HOM; 3	3rd	6581
2011	Kevin Harvick	29	Chevy	DAY; 42	PHO; 4	LVS; 17	BRI; 6	CAL; 1	MAR; 1	TEX; 20	TAL; 5	RCH; 12	DAR; 17	DOV; 10	CLT; 1	KAN; 11	POC; 5	MCH; 14	SON; 9	DAY; 7	KEN; 16	NHA; 21	IND; 11	POC; 14	GLN; 6	MCH; 22	BRI; 22	ATL; 7	RCH; 1*	CHI; 2	NHA; 12	DOV; 10	KAN; 6	CLT; 6	TAL; 32	MAR; 4	TEX; 13	PHO; 19	HOM; 8	3rd	2345
2012	Kevin Harvick	29	Chevy	DAY; 7	PHO; 2*	LVS; 11	BRI; 11	CAL; 4	MAR; 19	TEX; 9	KAN; 6	RCH; 19	TAL; 25	DAR; 16	CLT; 8	DOV; 2	POC; 14	MCH; 10	SON; 16	KEN; 11	DAY; 23	NHA; 8	IND; 13	POC; 17	GLN; 15	MCH; 16	BRI; 15	ATL; 5	RCH; 10	CHI; 12	NHA; 11	DOV; 13	TAL; 11	CLT; 16	KAN; 11	MAR; 32	TEX; 9	PHO; 1	HOM; 8	8th	2321
2013	Kevin Harvick	29	Chevy	DAY; 42	PHO; 13	LVS; 9	BRI; 14	CAL; 13	MAR; 13	TEX; 13	KAN; 12	RCH; 1	TAL; 40	DAR; 5	CLT; 1	DOV; 8	POC; 9	MCH; 2	SON; 10	KEN; 10	DAY; 3	NHA; 7	IND; 19	POC; 17	GLN; 13	MCH; 2	BRI; 34	ATL; 9	RCH; 11	CHI; 3	NHA; 20	DOV; 6	KAN; 1*	CLT; 6	TAL; 12	MAR; 6	TEX; 8	PHO; 1*	HOM; 10	3rd	2385
2014	Austin Dillon	3	Chevy	DAY; 9	PHO; 24	LVS; 16	BRI; 11	CAL; 11	MAR; 15	TEX; 21	DAR; 11	RCH; 27	TAL; 15	KAN; 19	CLT; 16	DOV; 20	POC; 17	MCH; 30	SON; 17	KEN; 16	DAY; 5	NHA; 14	IND; 10	POC; 15	GLN; 16	MCH; 22	BRI; 28	ATL; 24	RCH; 20	CHI; 16	NHA; 11	DOV; 24	KAN; 8	CLT; 13	TAL; 12	MAR; 12	TEX; 21	PHO; 38	HOM; 25	20th	958
2015	Austin Dillon	3	Chevy	DAY; 14	ATL; 39	LVS; 20	PHO; 15	CAL; 16	MAR; 41	TEX; 20	BRI; 10	RCH; 27	TAL; 35	KAN; 22	CLT; 16	DOV; 33	POC; 19	MCH; 20	SON; 17	DAY; 7	KEN; 25	NHA; 8	IND; 25	POC; 13	GLN; 36	MCH; 4	BRI; 13	DAR; 22	RCH; 27	CHI; 43	NHA; 22	DOV; 23	CLT; 7	KAN; 41	TAL; 14	MAR; 18	TEX; 11	PHO; 20	HOM; 14	21st	832
2016	Austin Dillon	3	Chevy	DAY; 9	ATL; 11	LVS; 5	PHO; 9	CAL; 24	MAR; 4	TEX; 19	BRI; 26	RCH; 20	TAL; 3	KAN; 6	DOV; 33	CLT; 12	POC; 37	MCH; 8	SON; 22	DAY; 7	KEN; 16	NHA; 13	IND; 9	POC; 13	GLN; 31	BRI; 4	MCH; 16	DAR; 12	RCH; 13	CHI; 14	NHA; 16	DOV; 8	CLT; 32	KAN; 6	TAL; 9	MAR; 17	TEX; 37	PHO; 39	HOM; 12	14th	2223
2017	Austin Dillon	3	Chevy	DAY; 19	ATL; 32	LVS; 25	PHO; 18	CAL; 11	MAR; 5	TEX; 33	BRI; 13	RCH; 20	TAL; 36	KAN; 16	CLT; 1	DOV; 13	POC; 13	MCH; 27	SON; 18	DAY; 36	KEN; 19	NHA; 15	IND; 21	POC; 21	GLN; 26	MCH; 7	BRI; 39	DAR; 4	RCH; 21	CHI; 16	NHA; 19	DOV; 16	CLT; 16	TAL; 29	KAN; 14	MAR; 13	TEX; 13	PHO; 14	HOM; 11	11th	2224
2018	Austin Dillon	3	Chevy	DAY; 1	ATL; 14	LVS; 13	PHO; 17	CAL; 10	MAR; 30	TEX; 26	BRI; 15	RCH; 15	TAL; 35	DOV; 26	KAN; 17	CLT; 34	POC; 12	MCH; 14	SON; 16	CHI; 37	DAY; 9	KEN; 22	NHA; 21	POC; 13	GLN; 27	MCH; 4	BRI; 13	DAR; 16	IND; 22	LVS; 11	RCH; 6	ROV; 39	DOV; 7	TAL; 17	KAN; 11	MAR; 30	TEX; 10	PHO; 8	HOM; 11	13th	2245
2019	Austin Dillon	3	Chevy	DAY; 16	ATL; 21	LVS; 20	PHO; 21	CAL; 10	MAR; 11	TEX; 14	BRI; 14	RCH; 6	TAL; 14	DOV; 19	KAN; 17	CLT; 34	POC; 37	MCH; 26	SON; 24	CHI; 10	DAY; 33*	KEN; 35	NHA; 32	POC; 19	GLN; 31	MCH; 13	BRI; 34	DAR; 10	IND; 12	LVS; 12	RCH; 22	ROV; 23	DOV; 18	TAL; 6	KAN; 20	MAR; 22	TEX; 13	PHO; 24	HOM; 8	21st	700
2020	Austin Dillon	3	Chevy	DAY; 12	LVS; 4	CAL; 24	PHO; 36	DAR; 11	DAR; 20	CLT; 14	CLT; 8	BRI; 6	ATL; 11	MAR; 37	HOM; 7	TAL; 39	POC; 19	POC; 14	IND; 18	KEN; 13	TEX; 1	KAN; 27	NHA; 13	MCH; 31	MCH; 8		DOV; 15	DOV; 9	DAY; 25	DAR; 2	RCH; 4	BRI; 12	LVS; 32	TAL; 12	ROV; 19	KAN; 11	TEX; 11	MAR; 23	PHO; 18	11th	2277
2020	Kaz Grala	3	Chevy																							DAY; 7														11th	2277
2021	Austin Dillon	3	Chevy	DAY; 3	DRC; 34	HOM; 12	LVS; 12	PHO; 17	ATL; 6	BRD; 21	MAR; 14	RCH; 10	TAL; 8	KAN; 10	DAR; 16	DOV; 14	COA; 12	CLT; 6	SON; 13	NSS; 12	POC; 21	POC; 13	ROA; 11	ATL; 12	NHA; 17	GLN; 15	IRC; 31	MCH; 36	DAY; 17	DAR; 10	RCH; 11	BRI; 15	LVS; 13	TAL; 11	ROV; 15	TEX; 14	KAN; 10	MAR; 13	PHO; 15	17th	935
2022	Austin Dillon	3	Chevy	DAY; 25	CAL; 2	LVS; 11	PHO; 21	ATL; 35	COA; 10	RCH; 10	MAR; 3	BRD; 31	TAL; 2	DOV; 23	DAR; 9	KAN; 13	CLT; 22	GTW; 15	SON; 11	NSS; 14	ROA; 31	ATL; 35	NHA; 23	POC; 10	IRC; 30	MCH; 13	RCH; 16	GLN; 17	DAY; 1	DAR; 17	KAN; 14	BRI; 31	TEX; 17	TAL; 13	ROV; 10	LVS; 10	HOM; 4	MAR; 33	PHO; 13	11th	2228
2023	Austin Dillon	3	Chevy	DAY; 33	CAL; 9	LVS; 27	PHO; 16	ATL; 20	COA; 33	RCH; 25	BRD; 3	MAR; 12	TAL; 38	DOV; 27	KAN; 10	DAR; 35	CLT; 9	GTW; 31	SON; 19	NSS; 13	CSC; 36	ATL; 21	NHA; 9	POC; 34	RCH; 9	MCH; 19	IRC; 16	GLN; 31	DAY; 33	DAR; 20	KAN; 33	BRI; 17	TEX; 36	TAL; 33	ROV; 14	LVS; 18	HOM; 10	MAR; 23	PHO; 12	29th	545
2024	Austin Dillon	3	Chevy	DAY; 37	ATL; 22	LVS; 16	PHO; 32	BRI; 24	COA; 25	RCH; 24	MAR; 34	TEX; 8	TAL; 30	DOV; 27	KAN; 25	DAR; 28	CLT; 27	GTW; 6	SON; 36	IOW; 19	NHA; 33	NSS; 32	CSC; 19	POC; 23	IND; 13	RCH; 1	MCH; 17	DAY; 22	DAR; 15	ATL; 20	GLN; 28	BRI; 21	KAN; 12	TAL; 8	ROV; 32	LVS; 37	HOM; 25	MAR; 7	PHO; 27	33rd	493
2025	Austin Dillon	3	Chevy	DAY; 23	ATL; 16	COA; 35	PHO; 12	LVS; 32	HOM; 13	MAR; 18	DAR; 23	BRI; 10	TAL; 10	TEX; 7	KAN; 22	CLT; 20	NSS; 29	MCH; 19	MXC; 28	POC; 24	ATL; 20	CSC; 36	SON; 21	DOV; 15	IND; 38	IOW; 10	GLN; 15	RCH; 1	DAY; 24	DAR; 23	GTW; 18	BRI; 28	NHA; 13	KAN; 27	ROV; 31	LVS; 25	TAL; 27	MAR; 16	PHO; 20	15th	2152
2026	Austin Dillon	3	Chevy	DAY; 37	ATL; 29	COA; 19	PHO; 16	LVS; 12	DAR; 25	MAR; 25	BRI; 18	KAN; 16	TAL; 19	TEX; 18	GLN; 6	CLT; 32	NSS; 18	MCH; 36	POC; 25	COR; 24	SON; 27	CHI; 24	ATL; 7	NWS; 23	IND; 29	IOW; 10	RCH; 19	NHA; 32	DAY; 7	DAR; 29	GTW; 6	BRI; 17	KAN; 21	LVS; 19	CLT; 26	PHO; 37	TAL; 11	MAR; 7	HOM; 26	25th	607
