= P3 =

P3, P-3, P.3, or P03 may refer to:

== Arts and entertainment ==
- P3 art and environment, an arts organisation in Tokyo, Japan
- P3, a fictional nightclub in the television series Charmed

=== Music ===
- PartyNextDoor 3, a 2016 album by PartyNextDoor

=== Radio stations ===
- DR P3, Denmark
- NRK P3, Norway
- Sveriges Radio P3, Sweden

== Organizations ==
- P3 group, a German engineering consultancy
- Polish Pirate Party, a political party in Poland
- P3 International, the maker of Kill A Watt electricity usage meters
- P3 America, Britain and France as nuclear powers

== Mathematics ==
- p3 (symmetry group)
- P3, a trigonal space group
- P3̅, a trigonal space group

== Science and medicine ==
- P3 laboratory, a biosafety-level-3 laboratory
- P3 peptide
- P3 protein
- ATC code P03 Ectoparasiticides, including scabicides, insecticides and repellents, a subgroup of the Anatomical Therapeutic Chemical Classification System
- P300 (neuroscience) or P3, a neural evoked potential component of the electroencephalogram (EEG)

== Technology ==
- Honda P3, a robot
- Pentax P3, a camera model
- Pindad P3, a pistol
- Pioneer P-3, an intended lunar orbiter probe
- P3, successor to the Rega Planar 3 LP record player
- Sony Cyber-shot DSC-P3, a Sony Cyber-shot camera

=== Computing ===
- DCI-P3, a color space used for some monitors and projectors
- Intel 80386, the third processor in the x86 line
- Pentium III, a brand of microprocessors
- Primavera (software), or Primavera Project Planner, a project management software package

== Transportation ==
- P3 (AirTrain Newark station)
- NER Class P3, a locomotive
- P3, a national road in Latvia

=== Automobiles ===
- Alfa Romeo P3, a racing car
- Ford Taunus P3, a mid-sized saloon
- Rover P3, an executive car
- Volvo P3 platform, an automobile platform

=== Aviation ===
- Curtiss P-3 Hawk, an American fighter aircraft of the 1920s
- Lockheed P-3 Orion, an American maritime patrol aircraft
- Piaggio P.3, an Italian night bomber prototype of the 1920s
- Pilatus P-3, a Swiss military training aircraft of the 1950s
- Cochise College Airport in Cochise County, Arizona

== Other uses ==
- Public–private partnership, a type of business venture

== See also ==
- 3P (disambiguation)
- PPP (disambiguation)
