= Third Age (disambiguation) =

The Third Age is the era during which J. R. R. Tolkien's The Lord of the Rings fantasy novel is set, and part of Tolkien's broader Middle-earth legendarium. Related pages include:

- The Lord of the Rings: The Third Age, a 2004 video game
- The Lord of the Rings: The Third Age (Game Boy Advance), a 2004 video game

Third Age may also refer to:

- Third age (retirement), active retirement
- Third Age Foundation (UK), a UK-based non-profit organization
- University of the Third Age, a UK-based international organization
- The time period during which The Wheel of Time series takes place
- The third age of mankind, during which Babylon 5 takes place
- Tertiary, a former geological period spanning from 66 to 2.6 million years ago.

== See also ==
- Party of the Third Age (Luxembourgish: Partei vum 3. Alter), a former political party in Luxembourg
