= Second person =

Second person can refer to the following:

- A grammatical person (you, your and yours in the English language)
- Second-person narrative, a perspective in storytelling
- Second Person (band), a trip-hop band from London
- God the Son, the Second Person of the Christian Trinity

== See also ==
- First person (disambiguation)
- Third person (disambiguation)
- Second party (disambiguation)
