= The Third Album =

The Third Album may refer to:

- The Third Album (Barbra Streisand album), 1964
- The Third Album (Paul Jabara album), 1979

== See also ==
- Third Album, a 1970 album by The Jackson 5
- Third Album (Shocking Blue album), 1971
- Third (disambiguation)
