= P3 protein =

Protein-coding gene in the species Homo sapiens

SLC10A3

Identifiers
- Aliases: SLC10A3, DXS253E, P3, solute carrier family 10 member 3
- External IDs: OMIM: 312090; MGI: 95048; GeneCards: SLC10A3

Gene location (Human)
Chr.	X chromosome (human)
Band	Xq28	Start	154,487,306 bp
Band	Xq28	End	154,490,690 bp

Gene location (Mouse)
Chr.	X chromosome (mouse)
Band	X A7.3|X 38.0 cM	Start	73,412,823 bp
Band	X A7.3|X 38.0 cM	End	73,416,955 bp
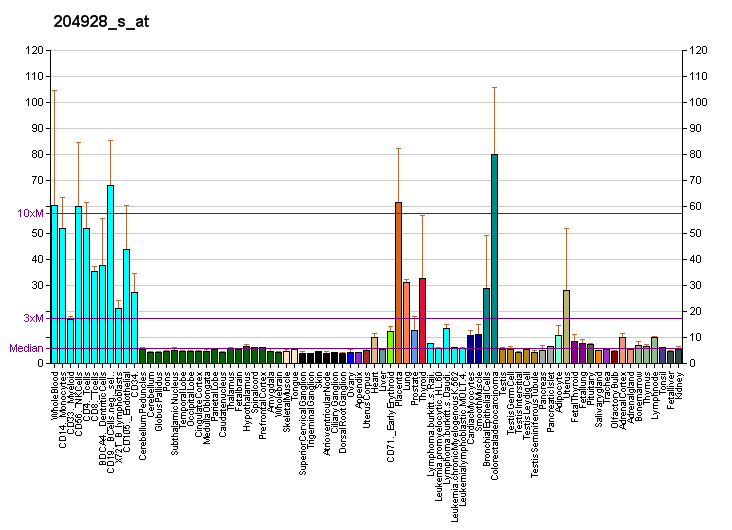
RNA expression pattern
Bgee	Human / Mouse (ortholog); Top expressed in: right coronary artery; Descending thoracic aorta; skin of leg; ascending aorta; stromal cell of endometrium; right ovary; granulocyte; decidua; skin of abdomen; left ovary / Top expressed in: decidua; granulocyte; zygote; seminal vesicula; external carotid artery; internal carotid artery; primary oocyte; epithelium of stomach; gastrula; Ileal epithelium; More reference expression data
BioGPS	More reference expression data
Gene ontology
Molecular function	symporter activity; bile acid:sodium symporter activity
Cellular component	membrane; integral component of membrane
Biological process	response to retinoic acid; transmembrane transport; response to organic substance; bile acid and bile salt transport
Sources:Amigo / QuickGO
Orthologs
Databases	NCBI: entry; OMA: entry
Species	Human	Mouse
Entrez	8273	214601
Ensembl	ENSG00000126903	ENSMUSG00000032806
UniProt	P09131	P21129
RefSeq (mRNA)	NM_001142391; NM_001142392; NM_019848	NM_001256104; NM_145406
RefSeq (protein)	NP_001135863; NP_001135864; NP_062822	NP_001243033; NP_663381
Location (UCSC)	Chr X: 154.49 – 154.49 Mb	Chr X: 73.41 – 73.42 Mb
PubMed search
- Wikidata
View/Edit Human	View/Edit Mouse

P3 protein is a protein that in humans is encoded by the SLC10A3 gene.

This gene maps to a GC-rich region of the X chromosome and was identified by its proximity to a CpG island. It is thought to be a housekeeping gene.

== See also ==
- SLC10A3+protein,+human at the U.S. National Library of Medicine Medical Subject Headings (MeSH)
