= 1/3 =

1/3 or 1/3 may refer to:

== Dates ==
- January 3 (month–day notation)
- 1 March (day–month notation)
- January of the year 3 AD (month–year notation)
- March of the year 1 AD (year–month notation)

== Other uses ==
- 1/3, a fraction (one third, 0.3̅ or 0.33333... in decimal, Unicode ⅓)
- Pre-decimal British sterling currency of 1 shilling and 3 pence
- 1st Battalion, 3rd Marines, US infantry battalion
- One/Three, a 2001 studio album by Dabrye
- Loona 1/3, a Loona spin-off

== See also ==
- Third (disambiguation)
