= First degree =

First degree may refer to:

- An undergraduate degree or a first professional degree
- First Degree, a drama series
- First-degree black belt (martial arts), a proficiency level earned in martial arts
- First-degree murder
- A first-degree burn
- First-degree price discrimination
- First-degree atrioventricular block, a disease of the electrical conduction system of the heart
- Parent/offspring or sibling (first-degree relative)
- A first cousin (third-degree relative)
- The First Degree, a 1923 American film directed by Edward Sedgwick starring Frank Mayo

== See also ==
- Second degree (disambiguation)
- In the 1st Degree, a 1995 interactive legal drama adventure computer game
