= Number Three =

Number Three may refer to:

- No. 3, a 1997 South Korean gangster comedy film
- Nº3, an album by Dot Hacker
- Number Three (Battlestar Galactica), a character from the re-imagined Battlestar Galactica television series
- 3 (number), a number, numeral, and glyph
- A character from the television series The Prisoner
- Numbuh Three, a character from Codename: Kids Next Door
- a character from Short Circuit
- Richard Childress Racing Car No. 3
- Number Three (single), a 2012 single by My Chemical Romance
- "Number Three", a song by They Might Be Giants from the album They Might Be Giants

== See also ==
- 3 (disambiguation)
