= Third base (disambiguation) =

Third base can mean:

- Third baseman in baseball
- Slang for intimate contact, a baseball metaphor for sex
- Third Base, a 1978 Japanese-language film directed by Yoichi Higashi

== See also ==
- 3rd Bass, an American hip hop group, active from 1987 to 1992
