= Third degree =

Third degree may refer to:

- The third degree, a colloquial expression for torture or intensive interrogation

== Arts, entertainment, and media ==
=== Film ===
- The Third Degree (1913 film), American silent melodrama
- The Third Degree (1919 film), American silent drama
- The Third Degree (1926 film), American romance film
- The Third Degree (2001 film), American crime television film by Steve Miner
- Third Degree Films, American pornographic film studio

=== Literature ===
- 3rd Degree (novel), 2004, by James Patterson
- Third Degree, a book by Tania Roxborogh

=== Music ===
- Third Degree (Johnny Winter album), 1986
- Third Degree (Flying Colors album), 2019
- Third Degree (styled "THIRD D3GREE"), predecessor to Australian pop duo The Clique

=== Television and radio ===
- 3rd Degree (game show), an American TV show
- 3rd Degree, a South African current affairs TV show on eNCA
- The 3rd Degree (radio series), a BBC Radio 4 quiz show
- The 3rd Degree, a series of stage shows which became the Australian TV series The Ronnie Johns Half Hour in 2005

== Ranks ==
- Third degree, a level of black belt in martial arts
- Third degree or Master Mason, a rank of Freemasonry
- Third degree, the highest rank in British Traditional Wicca

== See also ==
- First degree (disambiguation)
- Second degree (disambiguation)
- The Three Degrees, an R&B vocal group
