= 2002 Pennsylvania 500 =

20th race of the 2002 NASCAR Winston Cup Series

2002 Pep Boys presents the Pennsylvania 500
Race details
- Race 20 of 36 in the 2002 NASCAR Winston Cup Series
- The 2002 Pennsylvania 500 program cover.
- Date: July 28, 2002
- Official name: 30th Annual Pep Boys presents the Pennsylvania 500
- Location: Long Pond, Pennsylvania, Pocono Raceway
- Course: Permanent racing facility
- Course length: 2.5 miles (4.0 km)
- Distance: 175 laps, 437.5 mi (704.088 km)
- Scheduled distance: 200 laps, 500 mi (804.672 km)
- Average speed: 125.809 miles per hour (202.470 km/h)

Pole position
Driver	Bill Elliott	Evernham Motorsports
- Time: 52.765

Most laps led
Driver	Sterling Marlin	Chip Ganassi Racing
- Laps: 106

Winner
No. 9	Bill Elliott	Evernham Motorsports

Television in the United States
- Network: TNT
- Announcers: Allen Bestwick, Benny Parsons, Wally Dallenbach Jr.

Radio in the United States
- Radio: Motor Racing Network

The 2002 Pep Boys presents the Pennsylvania 500 was the 20th stock car race of the 2002 NASCAR Winston Cup Series and the 30th iteration of the event. The race was held on Sunday, July 28, 2002, in Long Pond, Pennsylvania, at Pocono Raceway, a 2.5 miles (4.0 km) triangular permanent course. The race was shortened from its scheduled from its scheduled 200 laps to 175 due to darkness caused by delays during the race. At race's end, Bill Elliott, driving for Evernham Motorsports, would pull away during the late stages of the race to win his 42nd career NASCAR Winston Cup Series win and his first of the season. To fill out the podium, Kurt Busch of Roush Racing and Sterling Marlin of Chip Ganassi Racing would finish second and third, respectively.

== Background ==
The layout of Pocono Raceway, the venue where the race was held.

The race was held at Pocono Raceway, which is a three-turn superspeedway located in Long Pond, Pennsylvania. The track hosts two annual NASCAR Sprint Cup Series races, as well as one Xfinity Series and Camping World Truck Series event. Until 2019, the track also hosted an IndyCar Series race.

Pocono Raceway is one of a very few NASCAR tracks not owned by either Speedway Motorsports or International Speedway Corporation. It is operated by the Igdalsky siblings Brandon, Nicholas, and sister Ashley, and cousins Joseph IV and Chase Mattioli, all of whom are third-generation members of the family-owned Mattco Inc, started by Joseph II and Rose Mattioli.

Outside of the NASCAR races, the track is used throughout the year by Sports Car Club of America (SCCA) and motorcycle clubs as well as racing schools and an IndyCar race. The triangular oval also has three separate infield sections of racetrack – North Course, East Course and South Course. Each of these infield sections use a separate portion of the tri-oval to complete the track. During regular non-race weekends, multiple clubs can use the track by running on different infield sections. Also some of the infield sections can be run in either direction, or multiple infield sections can be put together – such as running the North Course and the South Course and using the tri-oval to connect the two.

=== Entry list ===
- (R) denotes rookie driver.

#	Driver	Team	Make
1	Steve Park	Dale Earnhardt, Inc.	Chevrolet
2	Rusty Wallace	Penske Racing	Ford
4	Mike Skinner	Morgan–McClure Motorsports	Chevrolet
5	Terry Labonte	Hendrick Motorsports	Chevrolet
6	Mark Martin	Roush Racing	Ford
7	Casey Atwood	Ultra-Evernham Motorsports	Dodge
8	Dale Earnhardt Jr.	Dale Earnhardt, Inc.	Chevrolet
9	Bill Elliott	Evernham Motorsports	Dodge
10	Johnny Benson Jr.	MBV Motorsports	Pontiac
11	Brett Bodine	Brett Bodine Racing	Ford
12	Ryan Newman (R)	Penske Racing	Ford
14	Mike Wallace	A. J. Foyt Enterprises	Pontiac
15	Michael Waltrip	Dale Earnhardt, Inc.	Chevrolet
17	Matt Kenseth	Roush Racing	Ford
18	Bobby Labonte	Joe Gibbs Racing	Pontiac
19	Jeremy Mayfield	Evernham Motorsports	Dodge
20	Tony Stewart	Joe Gibbs Racing	Pontiac
21	Elliott Sadler	Wood Brothers Racing	Ford
22	Ward Burton	Bill Davis Racing	Dodge
23	Hut Stricklin	Bill Davis Racing	Dodge
24	Jeff Gordon	Hendrick Motorsports	Chevrolet
25	Joe Nemechek	Hendrick Motorsports	Chevrolet
26	Geoff Bodine	Haas-Carter Motorsports	Ford
27	Kirk Shelmerdine	Kirk Shelmerdine Racing	Ford
28	Ricky Rudd	Robert Yates Racing	Ford
29	Kevin Harvick	Richard Childress Racing	Chevrolet
30	Jeff Green	Richard Childress Racing	Chevrolet
31	Robby Gordon	Richard Childress Racing	Chevrolet
32	Ricky Craven	PPI Motorsports	Ford
36	Ken Schrader	MB2 Motorsports	Pontiac
37	Derrike Cope	Quest Motor Racing	Ford
40	Sterling Marlin	Chip Ganassi Racing	Dodge
41	Jimmy Spencer	Chip Ganassi Racing	Dodge
43	John Andretti	Petty Enterprises	Dodge
44	Jerry Nadeau	Petty Enterprises	Dodge
45	Kyle Petty	Petty Enterprises	Dodge
48	Jimmie Johnson (R)	Hendrick Motorsports	Chevrolet
55	Bobby Hamilton	Andy Petree Racing	Chevrolet
77	Dave Blaney	Jasper Motorsports	Ford
79	Carl Long	SR Racing	Dodge
88	Dale Jarrett	Robert Yates Racing	Ford
89	Morgan Shepherd	Shepherd Racing Ventures	Ford
97	Kurt Busch	Roush Racing	Ford
99	Jeff Burton	Roush Racing	Ford
Official entry list

== Practice ==
=== First practice ===
The first practice session was held on Friday, July 26, at 11:20 AM EST, and would last for 2 hours. Ricky Rudd of Robert Yates Racing would set the fastest time in the session, with a lap of 52.859 and an average speed of 170.264 miles per hour (274.013 km/h).

Pos.	#	Driver	Team	Make	Time	Speed
1	28	Ricky Rudd	Robert Yates Racing	Ford	52.859	170.264
2	43	John Andretti	Petty Enterprises	Dodge	53.095	169.508
3	9	Bill Elliott	Evernham Motorsports	Dodge	53.131	169.393
Full first practice results

=== Second practice ===
The second practice session was held on Saturday, July 27, at 9:30 AM EST, and would last for 45 minutes. Ricky Rudd of Robert Yates Racing would set the fastest time in the session, with a lap of 54.410 and an average speed of 165.411 miles per hour (266.203 km/h).

Pos.	#	Driver	Team	Make	Time	Speed
1	28	Ricky Rudd	Robert Yates Racing	Ford	54.410	165.411
2	17	Matt Kenseth	Roush Racing	Ford	54.481	165.195
3	24	Jeff Gordon	Hendrick Motorsports	Chevrolet	54.489	165.171
Full second practice results

=== Final practice ===
The final practice session was held on Saturday, July 27, at 11:15 AM EST, and would last for 45 minutes. Kurt Busch of Roush Racing would set the fastest time in the session, with a lap of 54.747 and an average speed of 164.393 miles per hour (264.565 km/h).

Pos.	#	Driver	Team	Make	Time	Speed
1	97	Kurt Busch	Roush Racing	Ford	54.747	164.393
2	2	Rusty Wallace	Penske Racing	Ford	54.754	164.372
3	48	Jimmie Johnson (R)	Hendrick Motorsports	Chevrolet	54.825	164.159
Full Final practice results

== Qualifying ==
Qualifying was held on Friday, July 26, at 3:05 PM EST. Each driver would have two laps to set a fastest time; the fastest of the two would count as their official qualifying lap. Positions 1-36 would be decided on time, while positions 37-43 would be based on provisionals. Six spots are awarded by the use of provisionals based on owner's points. The seventh is awarded to a past champion who has not otherwise qualified for the race. If no past champ needs the provisional, the next team in the owner points will be awarded a provisional.

Bill Elliott of Evernham Motorsports would win the pole, setting a time of 52.765 and an average speed of 170.568 miles per hour (274.503 km/h).

Carl Long was the only driver to fail to qualify.

=== Full qualifying results ===
Pos.	#	Driver	Team	Make	Time	Speed
1	9	Bill Elliott	Evernham Motorsports	Dodge	52.765	170.568
2	28	Ricky Rudd	Robert Yates Racing	Ford	52.830	170.358
3	15	Michael Waltrip	Dale Earnhardt, Inc.	Chevrolet	52.889	170.168
4	19	Jeremy Mayfield	Evernham Motorsports	Dodge	52.967	169.917
5	43	John Andretti	Petty Enterprises	Dodge	53.009	169.783
6	10	Johnny Benson Jr.	MBV Motorsports	Pontiac	53.119	169.431
7	48	Jimmie Johnson (R)	Hendrick Motorsports	Chevrolet	53.122	169.421
8	12	Ryan Newman (R)	Penske Racing	Ford	53.128	169.402
9	2	Rusty Wallace	Penske Racing	Ford	53.143	169.354
10	20	Tony Stewart	Joe Gibbs Racing	Pontiac	53.156	169.313
11	8	Dale Earnhardt Jr.	Dale Earnhardt, Inc.	Chevrolet	53.173	169.259
12	44	Jerry Nadeau	Petty Enterprises	Dodge	53.185	169.221
13	40	Sterling Marlin	Chip Ganassi Racing	Dodge	53.209	169.144
14	1	Steve Park	Dale Earnhardt, Inc.	Chevrolet	53.239	169.049
15	88	Dale Jarrett	Robert Yates Racing	Ford	53.290	168.887
16	32	Ricky Craven	PPI Motorsports	Ford	53.333	168.751
17	6	Mark Martin	Roush Racing	Ford	53.338	168.735
18	55	Bobby Hamilton	Andy Petree Racing	Chevrolet	53.343	168.719
19	7	Casey Atwood	Ultra-Evernham Motorsports	Dodge	53.358	168.672
20	25	Joe Nemechek	Hendrick Motorsports	Chevrolet	53.390	168.571
21	77	Dave Blaney	Jasper Motorsports	Ford	53.420	168.476
22	17	Matt Kenseth	Roush Racing	Ford	53.461	168.347
23	97	Kurt Busch	Roush Racing	Ford	53.488	168.262
24	26	Geoff Bodine	Haas-Carter Motorsports	Ford	53.490	168.256
25	36	Ken Schrader	MB2 Motorsports	Pontiac	53.496	168.237
26	30	Jeff Green	Richard Childress Racing	Chevrolet	53.499	168.227
27	31	Robby Gordon	Richard Childress Racing	Chevrolet	53.614	167.867
28	24	Jeff Gordon	Hendrick Motorsports	Chevrolet	53.644	167.773
29	29	Kevin Harvick	Richard Childress Racing	Chevrolet	53.645	167.770
30	5	Terry Labonte	Hendrick Motorsports	Chevrolet	53.667	167.701
31	23	Hut Stricklin	Bill Davis Racing	Dodge	53.676	167.673
32	21	Elliott Sadler	Wood Brothers Racing	Ford	53.678	167.667
33	99	Jeff Burton	Roush Racing	Ford	53.713	167.557
34	22	Ward Burton	Bill Davis Racing	Dodge	53.732	167.498
35	41	Jimmy Spencer	Chip Ganassi Racing	Dodge	53.739	167.476
36	14	Mike Wallace	A. J. Foyt Enterprises	Pontiac	53.892	167.001
Provisionals
37	18	Bobby Labonte	Joe Gibbs Racing	Pontiac	53.955	166.806
38	45	Kyle Petty	Petty Enterprises	Dodge	54.174	166.131
39	4	Mike Skinner	Morgan–McClure Motorsports	Chevrolet	54.124	166.285
40	11	Brett Bodine	Brett Bodine Racing	Ford	54.392	165.465
41	37	Derrike Cope	Quest Motor Racing	Ford	54.591	164.862
42	27	Kirk Shelmerdine	Kirk Shelmerdine Racing	Ford	—	—
43	89	Morgan Shepherd	Shepherd Racing Ventures	Ford	55.309	162.722
Failed to qualify
44	79	Carl Long	SR Racing	Dodge	54.608	164.811
Official qualifying results

== Race ==
=== Lap 1 crash ===
On the first lap, outside pole sitter Ricky Rudd took the lead from pole sitter Bill Elliott in turn 1. Behind the leaders where a whole pack of cars were racing side by side, Rusty Wallace, who started 9th, was running in 10th when Steve Park, who started 11th, began to peak to Wallace's outside. Wallace went up to block Park but instead Wallace went across Park's nose and Wallace hit the wall. Park turned left to avoid Wallace but instead ran into his Dale Earnhardt Inc. teammate in Dale Earnhardt Jr. and Park spun across Jr's right front. Both Park and Junior began to spin and slide through the wet infield grass that was slippery due to the rain that fell. Park's car tipped towards the passenger side of the car and Junior ended up bulldozing Park's car into the inside of an old-fashioned highway guardrail barrier head-on and then with the passenger side and ended up breaking the barrier. Park's car ramped up over Junior's hood and Park flipped over about 2 times before coming to a rest on the driver's side door. Junior got out of his car in a big hurry and ran over to check on his teammate to see if he was ok. The caution flew and Ricky Rudd led the cars back to the line and the red flag was shown shortly after as rescue crews attempted to get Park out of his car. About 2 minutes after the crash, the rescue crews with the help of Dale Earnhardt Jr. were able to get Park out of his car. Park was uninjured and he and Junior walked together to a waiting ambulance to take them to the infield care center. The race was red-flagged for a total of 65 minutes due to the crews attempting to repair the broken barrier.

=== Rest of race ===
After the barrier was repaired, the red flag was lifted. The race restarted on lap 9 with Ricky Rudd leading the race. On the next lap, Bill Elliott took the lead from Rudd. On lap 24, the race was red-flagged again due to rain. The race was red-flagged for 2 hours and 2 minutes due to the rainy weather. Once the rain cleared and the track was dried, the race got back underway on lap 33 with Joe Nemechek as the race leader. On lap 39, Nemechek lost the lead to Sterling Marlin. Green flag pitstops began on lap 62 with Ricky Rudd, Elliott Sadler, and Robby Gordon taking the leads before they made their pit stops. Once everything cycled through, Marlin got his lead back. On lap 98, another cycle of green flag pit stops began again with Kurt Busch and Dave Blaney taking the leads before they made their pit stops. Marlin got his lead back after everything cycled through. The third caution flew on lap 105 when Mike Skinner's car stalled in turn 3. The race restarted on lap 110 with Marlin as the leader. During that green flag period, NASCAR decided to shorten the race from 200 laps to 175 laps due to darkness since the racetrack does not have lights. Green flag pitstops began again on lap 136 with Jeff Burton, Kurt Busch, and Jimmie Johnson switching the lead. With 37 laps to go, the 4th caution flew when Jeremy Mayfield crashed in turn 2. Sterling Marlin led the field to the restart with 30 to go. On the next lap, the 5th and final caution flew when Jerry Nadeau crashed in turn 2. With 24 to go, Marlin led the field to the restart. With 19 to go, Bill Elliott passed Sterling Marlin to take the lead and his first win of 2002. Kurt Busch, Sterling Marlin, Dale Jarrett, and Ryan Newman rounded out the top 5 while Kevin Harvick, Tony Stewart, Matt Kenseth, Terry Labonte, and Ricky Rudd rounded out the top 10.

== Race results ==
Fin	#	Driver	Team	Make	Laps	Led	Status	Pts	Winnings
1	9	Bill Elliott	Evernham Motorsports	Dodge	175	35	running	180	$193,401
2	97	Kurt Busch	Roush Racing	Ford	175	3	running	175	$113,570
3	40	Sterling Marlin	Chip Ganassi Racing	Dodge	175	106	running	175	$136,487
4	88	Dale Jarrett	Robert Yates Racing	Ford	175	0	running	160	$109,355
5	12	Ryan Newman (R)	Penske Racing	Ford	175	0	running	155	$85,975
6	29	Kevin Harvick	Richard Childress Racing	Chevrolet	175	0	running	150	$98,943
7	20	Tony Stewart	Joe Gibbs Racing	Pontiac	175	0	running	146	$96,043
8	17	Matt Kenseth	Roush Racing	Ford	175	0	running	142	$64,765
9	5	Terry Labonte	Hendrick Motorsports	Chevrolet	175	0	running	138	$78,498
10	28	Ricky Rudd	Robert Yates Racing	Ford	175	10	running	139	$93,182
11	18	Bobby Labonte	Joe Gibbs Racing	Pontiac	175	0	running	130	$93,743
12	24	Jeff Gordon	Hendrick Motorsports	Chevrolet	175	0	running	127	$93,903
13	6	Mark Martin	Roush Racing	Ford	175	0	running	124	$78,298
14	22	Ward Burton	Bill Davis Racing	Dodge	175	0	running	121	$82,865
15	48	Jimmie Johnson (R)	Hendrick Motorsports	Chevrolet	175	2	running	123	$46,515
16	99	Jeff Burton	Roush Racing	Ford	175	1	running	120	$84,032
17	32	Ricky Craven	PPI Motorsports	Ford	175	0	running	112	$51,265
18	15	Michael Waltrip	Dale Earnhardt, Inc.	Chevrolet	175	0	running	109	$50,965
19	55	Bobby Hamilton	Andy Petree Racing	Chevrolet	175	0	running	106	$63,515
20	36	Ken Schrader	MB2 Motorsports	Pontiac	175	0	running	103	$64,140
21	21	Elliott Sadler	Wood Brothers Racing	Ford	175	2	running	105	$58,254
22	77	Dave Blaney	Jasper Motorsports	Ford	175	2	running	102	$49,565
23	43	John Andretti	Petty Enterprises	Dodge	175	0	running	94	$68,323
24	25	Joe Nemechek	Hendrick Motorsports	Chevrolet	175	9	running	96	$48,990
25	31	Robby Gordon	Richard Childress Racing	Chevrolet	175	1	running	93	$67,171
26	30	Jeff Green	Richard Childress Racing	Chevrolet	175	0	running	85	$40,465
27	45	Kyle Petty	Petty Enterprises	Dodge	174	0	running	82	$40,215
28	7	Casey Atwood	Ultra-Evernham Motorsports	Dodge	174	0	running	79	$40,065
29	4	Mike Skinner	Morgan–McClure Motorsports	Chevrolet	173	0	running	76	$39,390
30	10	Johnny Benson Jr.	MBV Motorsports	Pontiac	173	0	running	73	$63,990
31	23	Hut Stricklin	Bill Davis Racing	Dodge	168	0	transmission	70	$36,590
32	41	Jimmy Spencer	Chip Ganassi Racing	Dodge	162	0	engine	67	$36,440
33	11	Brett Bodine	Brett Bodine Racing	Ford	157	0	running	64	$36,240
34	26	Geoff Bodine	Haas-Carter Motorsports	Ford	154	0	engine	61	$61,227
35	37	Derrike Cope	Quest Motor Racing	Ford	154	0	engine	58	$35,865
36	44	Jerry Nadeau	Petty Enterprises	Dodge	146	0	crash	55	$35,665
37	8	Dale Earnhardt Jr.	Dale Earnhardt, Inc.	Chevrolet	144	0	running	52	$55,100
38	19	Jeremy Mayfield	Evernham Motorsports	Dodge	136	0	crash	49	$43,375
39	14	Mike Wallace	A. J. Foyt Enterprises	Pontiac	114	0	engine	46	$35,250
40	2	Rusty Wallace	Penske Racing	Ford	83	0	crash	43	$79,350
41	27	Kirk Shelmerdine	Kirk Shelmerdine Racing	Ford	81	0	brakes	40	$34,965
42	89	Morgan Shepherd	Shepherd Racing Ventures	Ford	52	4	overheating	42	$34,875
43	1	Steve Park	Dale Earnhardt, Inc.	Chevrolet	0	0	crash	34	$64,944
Official race results

Previous race: 2002 New England 300	NASCAR Winston Cup Series; 2002 season	Next race: 2002 Brickyard 400
