= The Third Party (webtoon) =

2017 webtoon

- Author: Enjelicious
- Website: Lezhin Comics
- Current status/schedule: Complete
- Launch date: January 2017
- Publisher: Lezhin Comics
- Genre(s): Thriller, Romance, Yuri

The Third Party is a thriller romance webtoon created by Filipino artist Enjelicious. The series follows a love triangle at a television broadcast company between the CEO's daughter, Jeong Hui, a news anchor, Sang Hun, and a production director, Hae Jin. It began publishing weekly on Lezhin Comics between January 2017 and April 2018 after winning first place in Lezhin Comics' inaugural US comic contest.

== Plot ==
Gu Jeong Hui, the daughter of a rich television broadcast CEO, has always followed her family's wishes for her, including marrying news anchor Sang Hun, despite feeling no love toward him. When Jeong Hui begins working at her fathers company she meets Moon Hae Jin, a production director, and the two form a strong connection to soon sparks into a romantic relationship. However Jeong Hui is unaware of Hae Jin true motivation to work at the company; to get revenge on the death of her father.

== Reception ==
In a review for WomenWriteAboutComics, Ari Sadler praised the series for being well written and paced, remarking that "the dialogue doesn't feel forced or cheesy and the actions of characters are believable" and finally summarizing "do you want a well drawn and presented dramatic story with understandable characters that are put into heart pounding and rage inducing situations? Then you should read The Third Party." Comic Book Resources also included the series in their "Steamiest Webtoons for Mature Romance Readers" list.
