= Third Age Foundation =

UK-based non-profit organization

The Third Age Foundation is an organisation which was set up in 1993, and is based in London, United Kingdom. TAF's main objective is to help disadvantaged people (40-plus) find a new direction, upskill them in up-to-date computer technology, including personal development and an action plan in an innovative holistic way. Students are regarded as mature, experienced people, who through no fault of their own, have been out of work or who are in work but "vulnerable". These people have either been made redundant, or forced into early retirement (or are about to do so), or for other or domestic reasons have had a career break and are having difficulty finding work or extra work – mainly because of their age.

TAF's ethos is based upon the premise that age discrimination against older people makes no economic sense, especially as half of the UK population is over 40. Recent findings regarding the future of state pensions in the UK (and because people are living longer and are fitter than ever before) show that they are likely to have another 30–40 years of active life ahead. By helping students assess their lives, motivating them, and showing them how to decide what path they should follow next to achieve their goals, as well as training them in information technology using up-to-date packages for a recognised qualification in Microsoft Office and giving them a quick introduction to e-mail and the Internet, Third Age has been very successful in finding a role for a large number of their students and thus helping the country's economy. Pensioners and mature students can learn computer skills working to achieve the ICT Skills for Life qualification.

The programme is intended to prepare students for employment and volunteering. The foundation reports that some participants subsequently enter employment, self-employment, volunteering, or mentoring.
