= Third-party source =

Good/service provider who is independent of both the buyer and seller

In commerce, a third-party source means a supplier (or service provider) who is not directly controlled by either the seller (first party) nor the customer/buyer (second party) in a business transaction. The third party is considered independent from the other two, even if hired by them, because not all control is vested in that connection. There can be multiple third-party sources with respect to a given transaction, between the first and second parties. A second-party source would be under direct control of the second party in the transaction.

In information technology, a third-party source is a supplier of software (or a computer accessory) which is independent of the supplier and customer of the major computer product(s).

In e-commerce, 3rd party (3P) source refers to a seller who publishes products on a marketplace, without this marketplace to own or physically carry those products. When an order comes in, a 3P seller has the item on hand and fulfills it. An example of 3P sellers are merchants participating in Amazon's FBM program.

== See also ==
- Third party (disambiguation)
- Third-party logistics (3PL)
- Computing platform
- Tertiary source
