= Third person =

Third person, or third-person, may refer to:

- Third person (grammar), a point of view (in English, he, she, it, and they)
  - Illeism, the act of referring to oneself in the third person
- Third-person narrative, a perspective in plays, storytelling, or movies
- Third-person view, a point of view in video games where the camera is positioned above the player character or characters
- Third-person (video games), a graphical perspective used in video games
  - Third-person shooter, a genre of 3D shooters with a third-person point of view
- The Third Person, a graphic novel by Emma Grove
- Third Person (band), a 1990s musical trio formed in New York City
- Third Person (film), a 2013 film

== See also ==
- First person (disambiguation)
- Second person (disambiguation)
- Third party (disambiguation)
- Third (disambiguation)
