= Third party =

Third party may refer to:

== Business ==
- Third-party source, a supplier company not owned by the buyer or seller
- Third-party beneficiary, a person who could sue on a contract, despite not being an active party
- Third-party insurance, such as a vehicle insurance

== Politics ==
- Third party (politics), any party contending for votes that failed to outpoll either of its two strongest rivals
  - Third Party (British political faction), a conservative British political faction formed in opposition to the French Revolution
  - Third party (U.S. politics), a US political term for parties other than the Democrats or Republicans
- Third party (SIPO), in Ireland, those who receive political donations but do not run for election

== Arts and entertainment ==
- 3rd Party, a 1990s American music group
- Third Party (album), by Blue Sky Black Death and Alexander Chen, 2010
- Third Party (DJs), a British DJ duo
- The Third Party, a 2016 Filipino romantic comedy drama film
- The Third Party (album), a 1989 album by Jules Shear
- The Third Party (webtoon), a thriller romance webtoon

== Computing ==
- Third-party software component

== See also ==
- Third person (disambiguation)
- 3P (disambiguation)
