= Third-party logistics =

Concept in logistics

Third-party logistics (abbreviated as 3PL, or TPL) is an organization's long-term commitment of outsourcing its distribution services to third-party logistics businesses. A 3PL provider is a company that supplies and/or coordinates logistics functions across multiple links in a supply chain. A 3PL provider acts as an intermediary between the seller or manufacturer (the first party) and the buyer or end user (the second party). Basically, 3PL might be defined as outsourcing of transport and logistics activi-ties to outside companies that are neither consignors nor consignees. 3PL came into existence during the deregulation of freight transport industry in the 1980s and has pro-gressed in the 1990s along with the development of information technologies.

Third-party logistics providers typically specialize in integrated operations of warehousing and transportation services that can be scaled and customized to customers' needs, based on market conditions, to meet the demands and delivery service requirements for their products. Services often extend beyond logistics to include value-added services related to the production or procurement of goods, such as services that integrate parts of the supply chain. A provider of such integrated services is referenced as a third-party supply chain management provider (3PSCM), or as a supply chain management service provider (SCMSP). 3PL targets particular functions within supply management, such as warehousing, transportation, or raw material provision.

== Types ==
Third-party logistics providers include freight forwarders, courier companies, and other companies integrating and offering subcontracted logistics and transportation services. Hertz and Alfredsson (2003) describe four categories of 3PL providers:

Standard 3PL Provider
This is the most basic form of a 3PL provider. They would perform activities such as, pick and pack, warehousing, and distribution (business) – the most basic functions of logistics. For a majority of these firms, the 3PL function is not quite their main activity. For many such organizations, logistics services are not their primary business activity., the 3PL capacity is not their primary action. Globalization has in a general sense changed the business condition. In light of this new money-related reality, creators and suppliers have gotten a handle on third social gathering collaborations (3PL) providers as key players in the generation organization.
Service Developer
This type of 3PL provider will offer their customers advanced value-added services such as: tracking and tracing, cross-docking, specific packaging, or providing a unique security system. A solid IT foundation and a focus on economies of scale and scope will enable this type of 3PL provider to perform these types of tasks. :: This type of 3PL provider works closely with the client and assumes responsibility for managing its logistics activities. The 3PL supplier enhances the coordination drastically yet does not build up another administration. The client base for this kind of 3PL supplier is ordinarily very little.
The Customer Adapter
this type of 3PL provider comes in at the request of the customer and essentially takes over complete control of the company's logistics activities. The 3PL provider takes over the customer's logistics activities but does not develop a new service. The customer base for this type of 3PL provider is typically quite small.
The Customer Developer
this is the highest level that a 3PL provider can attain with respect to its processes and activities. This occurs when the 3PL provider integrates itself with the customer and takes over their entire logistics function. These providers will have few customers, but will perform extensive and detailed tasks for them.

Outsourcing may involve a subset of an operation's logistics, leaving some products or operating steps untouched because the in-house logistics is able to do the work better or cheaper than an external provider. Customer orientation is another aspect of 3PL provider relationships. The provider has to fit to the structures and the requirements of the company. This fit is more important than the pure cost savings, like a survey of 3PL providers shows clearly: The customer orientation in form of adaptability to changing customer needs, reliability and the flexibility of third-party logistics provider were mentioned as much more important than pure cost savings.

=== Lead logistics providers ===
Lead logistics providers manage supply chain activities through external partners, offering flexibility and lower operating costs but potentially having less control and bargaining power than a third-party provider has based on a normally big company size, a good customer base and established network systems. 3PL providers may sacrifice efficiency by preferring their own assets in order to maximize their own efficiency. Lead logistics providers may also be less bureaucratic with shorter decision-making cycles due to the smaller size of the company.

== Layers ==
First party logistics providers (1PL) are single service providers in a specific geographic area that specialize in certain goods or shipping methods. Examples are: carrying companies, port operators, depot companies. The logistics department of a producing firm can also be a first party logistics provider if they have own transport assets and warehouses.

Second-party logistics providers (2PL) are service providers which provide their specialized logistics services in a larger (national) geographical area than the 1PL do. Often there are frame contracts between the 2PL and the customer, which regulate the conditions for the transport duties that are mostly placed short term. 2PLs provide own and external logistics resources like trucks, forklifts, warehouses etc. for transport, handling of cargo or warehouse management activities. Second-party logistics arose in the course of the globalization and the uprising trend of lean management when the companies began to outsource their logistics activities to focus on their own core competencies. Examples are courier, express and parcel services; ocean carriers, freight forwarders and transshipment providers.

The most significant difference between a second party logistics provider and a third-party logistics provider is the fact that a 3PL provider is always integrated into the customer's system. The 2PL is not integrated; in contrast to the 3PL, it is only an outsourced logistics provider with no system integration. A 2PL works often on call (e.g. express parcel services) whereas a 3PL is almost every time informed about the workload of the near future. As technology progresses, the methodology for notifying a 3PL of inbound workload usually falls on API integrations that connect, for example, an E-commerce store with a fulfilment center. Another point that distinguishes 2PL and 3PL is the specification and customizing of services. A 2PL normally only provides standardized services, whereas 3PLs often provide services that are customized and specialized to the needs of their customer. This is possible due to long-term contracts that are usual in the third-party logistics market. Cost-effectiveness of a third-party logistics provider is only given over long periods of time with stable contract and profits. In contrast to that, second party logistics services can't be customized, concerning to the fluctuating market with hard competition and a price battle on a low level. Another distinguishing factor between 2PL and 3PL is the duration of contracts. 3PL contracts are long-term contracts, whereas 2PL contracts are of low durability so that the customer is flexible in responding to market and price changes.

With companies operating globally, the need to increase supply chain visibility and reduce risk, improve velocity and reduce costs – all at the same time – requires a common technological solution. Non-asset based providers perform functions such as consultation on packaging and transportation, freight quoting, financial settlement, auditing, tracking, customer service and issue resolution. However, they do not employ any truck drivers or warehouse personnel, and they don't own any physical freight distribution assets of their own – no trucks, no storage trailers, no pallets, and no warehousing. A non-assets based provider consists of a team of domain experts with accumulated freight industry expertise and information technology assets. They fill a role similar to freight agents or brokers but maintain a significantly greater degree of “hands-on” involvement in the transportation of products. These providers are 4PL and 5PL services.

A fourth party logistics provider has no owned transport assets or warehouse capacity. They have an allocative and integration function within a supply chain with the aim of increasing the efficiency of it. The concept of a fourth-party logistics provider was born in the 1970s by the consulting company Accenture. Firms are outsourcing their selection of third-party logistics provider and the optimization process of the integration of these to a PL as an intermediary. That reduces costs and the 4PL have to have an overview of the whole logistics market to choose the ideal 3PL for all operative logistic activities. For being able to provide such an ideal solution fourth-party logistics providers need a good knowledge of the logistics branch and a good IT infrastructure. A fourth party logistics provider selects the 3PL providers from the market which are most suitable for the logistical issues of their customer. Unlike the allocative function of a 4PL in the supply chain, the core competence of a 3PL provider is the operative logistics.

Fifth party logistics providers (5PL) provide supply chain management and offer system-oriented consulting and supply chain management services to their customers. Advancements in technology and the associated increases in supply chain visibility and inter-company communications have given rise to a relatively new model for third-party logistics operations – the "non-asset based logistics provider."

== Horizontal alliances ==
Raue & Wieland (2015) describe the example of horizontal alliances between logistics service providers, i.e., the cooperation between two or more logistics companies that are potentially competing. Logistics companies can benefit twofold from such an alliance. On the one hand, they can "access tangible resources which are directly exploitable". This includes extending common transportation networks, their warehouse infrastructure and the ability to provide more complex service packages by combining resources. On the other hand, LSPs can "access intangible resources, which are not directly exploitable". This includes know-how and information and, in turn, innovation.

== Advantages ==
=== Cost and time savings ===
Logistics is the core competence of third-party logistics providers. Providers may have better related knowledge and greater expertise than the producing or selling company, and may also have more global networks enabling greater time and cost efficiencies.

The equipment and the IT systems of 3PL providers are constantly updated and adapted to match the requirements of their customers and their customer's suppliers. Producing or selling companies often do not have the time, resources, or expertise to adapt their equipment and systems as quickly.

=== Low capital commitment ===
Assuming most or every single agent work is redistributed to a 3PL supplier, there is typically no requirement for the customer to possess its very own stockroom or transport offices, bringing down the measure of capital required for the customer’s matter of fact. This is also helpful if an organization’s stockroom has high varieties in limit use, prompting over purchasing of distribution center limit and lessening productivity.

If most or all operative functions are outsourced to a 3PL provider, there is usually no need for the client to own its own warehouse or transport facilities, lowering the amount of capital required for the client's business. This is particularly beneficial if a company's warehouse has high variations in capacity utilization, leading to over purchasing of warehouse capacity and reducing profitability.

=== Focus ===
Logistics outsourcing allows companies with limited logistics expertise to focus on their core business. Increasing complexity in business suggests that companies benefit from not devoting resources to areas in which they are not skilled.

3PLs often specialize in specific industries. Their experience can help clients scale their business quickly through levering the logistics providers knowledge across their industry. Coordination redistributing enables organizations with restricted coordination skill to center around their center business. Expanding unpredictability in business proposes that organizations profit by not committing assets to regions in which they are not skilled.

=== Flexibility ===
Third-party logistics providers can provide higher flexibility for geographic distribution and may offer a larger variety of services than clients could provide for themselves. Postal services and private couriers typically factor in distance when they calculate the cost of shipping; many 3PL providers market the benefit of what is known as zone skipping to potential clients, because it shortens the distance between products to be shipped and customers, resulting in lower shipping costs. This also allows businesses to more predictably manage their resources including workforce size, and turn fixed costs into variable costs.

=== Capacity ===
3PL Providers typically have a large network of carriers (air, ground, and ocean) which are located all throughout the state, country, or region of the globe. This allows them to coordinate logistics services and serve customers across different locations. For example, SF Express which is one of the third-party carrier providers on Alibaba and is China’s largest private carrier by market value. In 2017, SF handled a total of 3.05 billion shipments, an 18% increase compared to 2016. All its shipments are distributed by its full-time employees to customers’ doorsteps via self-operated (proprietary) trucks and airplanes, or high-speed trains, which helps SF achieve speedy, reliable, and professional pickup and delivery services. It is 50% faster than public delivery companies and 20% faster than private delivery companies in China.

== Disadvantages ==
=== Loss of control ===
One disadvantage is the loss of control a client has by using third-party logistics. With outbound logistics, the 3PL provider usually assumes communication and interactions with a firm's customer or supplier. To mitigate this, some 3PL's attempt to brand themselves as their clients, such as applying clients' logos on their assets and dressing their employees like their clients' employees.

=== Over-dependence on external partners ===
Over-relying on a third party for logistics introduces a level of dependence on external partners. If the 3PL provider faces any issues or disruptions, such as delays, quality concerns, or system failures, it can directly impact the business's operations.

=== Hidden costs ===
While cost savings are a notable advantage, you must be cautious of potential hidden costs associated with 3PL arrangements. Additional fees for special services, changes in volume, or custom requirements can accumulate, eroding the initially perceived cost benefits. Transparent and detailed contracts are essential to avoid unexpected financial surprises.

=== Limited customization ===
Most 3PL providers often operate within standardized processes and systems, limiting the level of customization available to individual businesses. For example, if you are a company with unique or complex supply chain requirements, aligning a 3PL's offerings with your specific needs will be challenging. Remember, these customizations always come with a hefty price tag.

=== Communication Challenges ===
Effective communication is essential for successful logistics operations, but it can be challenging to maintain clear and timely communication when working with a third-party provider. Misunderstandings, delays, and discrepancies can occur, disrupting the supply chain and ultimately impacting customer satisfaction.

=== IT ===
The IT systems of the provider and the client must be interoperable. Technology helps increase visibility for the client by way of continuous status updates via Dispatch Management Software and Electronic Data Interchange (EDI) which does involve a cost, but it can help avoid penalties for delays and subsequent financial losses such as from not unloading freight in time.

=== Reverse logistics ===
Numerous studies have shown that selling products online, rather than in a brick and retail environment, adds extra costs when it comes to handling returns (i.e., reverse logistics). The reliance upon third-party logistics providers to handle aspects of the e-commerce supply chain such as warehousing and pick-and-pack also means these companies must be relied on to handle reverse logistics. Artificially induced demand events such as Black Friday in the United States or Singles' Day in China come with an influx of returned products, which can slow down warehouse operations and in turn delay the issuing of refunds or other methods for mitigating dissatisfied customers.

Various industries have found ways to capitalize on reverse logistics by recycling materials such as metal and electrical goods recycling.

=== Poor optimization ===
Unlike in-house logistics, 3PL provider often unable to address the concerns of the clients to reach the goal of cost optimization with the trade of convenience, capacity, and scale. This results in increasing the cost of operation for the company once the service user grows in size. Therefore, in order to resolve this issue, a proper transition needs to be executed to ensure the operation scaling can be maintained optimally while also minimizing the cost.

== See also ==
- Freight
- Shipping
