= List of awards and nominations received by Rufus Wainwright =

Rufus Wainwright awards and nominations
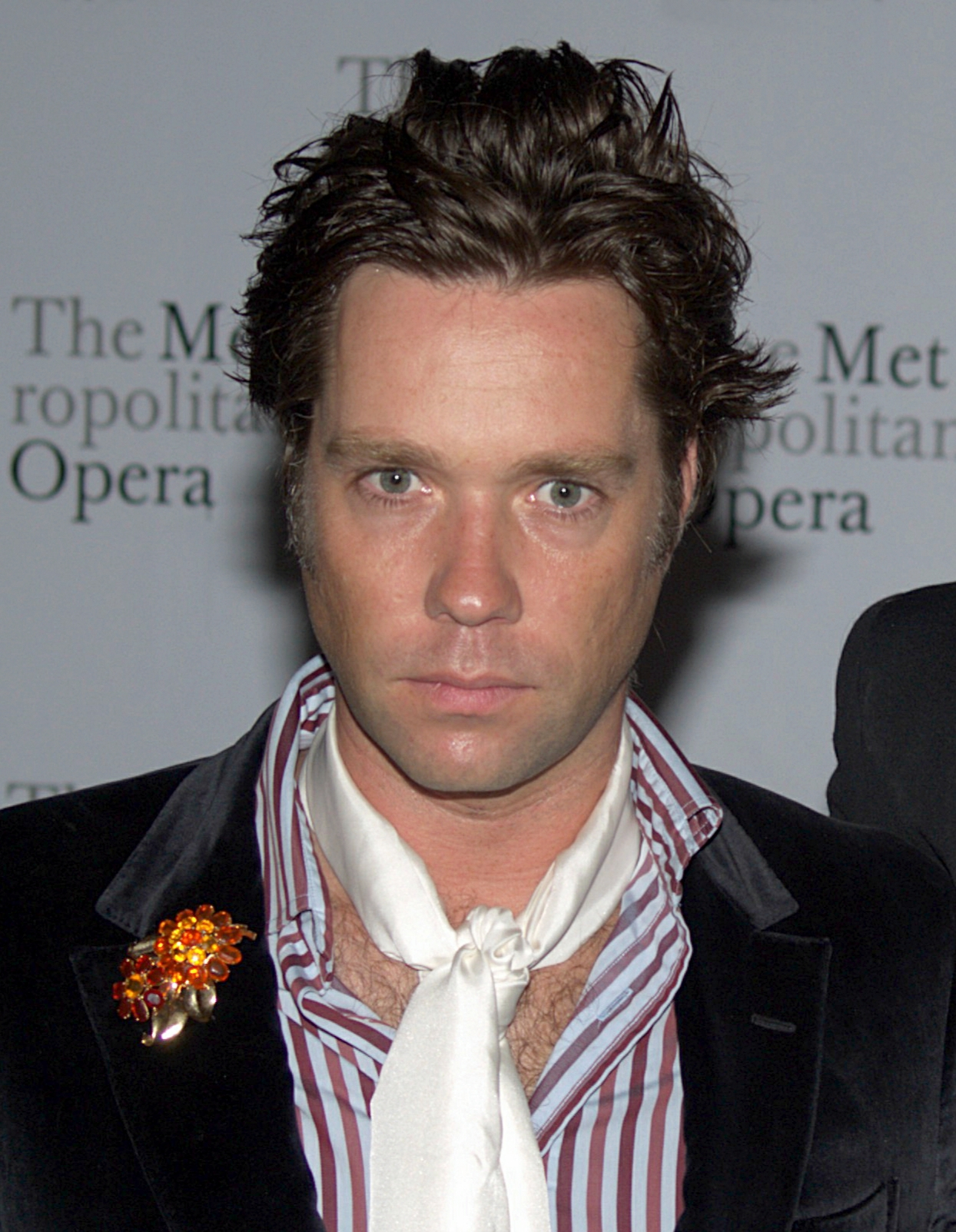
- Rufus Wainwright at the Metropolitan Opera in 2010
Awards & Nominations
| Award | Won | Nominated |
| Annie Awards | 0 | 1 |
| BRIT Awards | 0 | 1 |
| Dora Mavor Moore Awards | 1 | 2 |
| Gay & Lesbian American Music Awards | 1 | 4 |
| Genie Awards | 0 | 1 |
| GLAAD Media Awards | 5 | 7 |
| GQ Awards | 0 | 1 |
| Grammy Awards | 0 | 3 |
| Helpmann Awards | 0 | 1 |
| Juno Awards | 2 | 7 |
| Meteor Music Awards | 0 | 2 |
| MOJO Awards | 0 | 3 |
| OutMusic Awards | 1 | 2 |
| Shortlist Music Prize | 0 | 1 |
| Stonewall Awards | 0 | 1 |
- Total number of wins and nominations
| Totals | 10 | 36 |
- Footnotes

Rufus Wainwright is a Canadian-American singer-songwriter. He has released eight studio albums of original music: Rufus Wainwright (1998), Poses (2001), Want One (2003), Want Two (2004), Release the Stars (2007), All Days Are Nights: Songs for Lulu (2010), Out of the Game (2012), and Take All My Loves: 9 Shakespeare Sonnets (2016). In addition, he has released three live albums: Rufus Does Judy at Carnegie Hall (2007), Milwaukee at Last!!! (2009), and Rufus Wainwright: Live from the Artists Den (2014). Several of Wainwright's singles have appeared on the UK Singles Chart, including "I Don't Know What It Is" which peaked at No. 74, "Hallelujah" which peaked at No. 100, and "Going to a Town" which peaked at No. 54.

Wainwright's first major recognition came from Rolling Stone, when the magazine named him 1998's "Best New Artist" after the release of his debut album. Since then, he has received nominations from the BRIT Awards, Genie Awards, Grammy Awards, Meteor Music Awards, MOJO Awards and Shortlist Music Prize, but has yet to receive one of these awards. He has received two Juno Awards from seven nominations. For his success and excellence as an LGBT artist, he has been awarded once (from four nominations) by the Gay & Lesbian American Music Awards, and five times (from seven nominations) by the GLAAD Media Awards. Overall, Wainwright has received 10 awards from 35 nominations.

== Annie Awards ==
The Annie Awards is an animation award show created and produced by the Los Angeles, California branch of the International Animated Film Association, ASIFA-Hollywood, since 1972. Originally designed to celebrate lifetime or career contributions to animation in the fields of producing, directing, animation, design, writing, voice acting, sound and sound effects, etc., in 1992 it began to honor animation as a whole, and created the category of Best Animated Feature. New categories were subsequently added for different animation media. Wainwright has been nominated once.

| Year | Nominated work | Award | Result | Ref. |
|---|---|---|---|---|
| 2007 | Danny Elfman, Rufus Wainwright, Rob Thomas: Meet the Robinsons | Music in an Animated Feature Production | Nominated | |

== BRIT Awards ==
The BRIT Awards are the British Phonographic Industry's (BPI) annual pop music awards. Wainwright has been nominated once.

| Year | Nominated work | Award | Result | Ref. |
|---|---|---|---|---|
| 2008 | Rufus Wainwright | Best International Male Artist | Nominated | |

== Dora Mavor Moore Awards ==
The Dora Mavor Moore Awards, presented annually by the Toronto Alliance for the Performing Arts, honor quality theatre in Toronto. Wainwright has received one award from two nominations.

| Year | Nominated work | Award | Result | Ref. |
|---|---|---|---|---|
| 2011 | Rufus Wainwright (Prima Donna) | Outstanding New Musical/Opera | Won | |
| 2011 | Prima Donna | Outstanding Production | Nominated | |

== GAFFA Awards ==
=== Denmark GAFFA Awards ===
Delivered since 1991, the GAFFA Awards are a Danish award that rewards popular music by the magazine of the same name.

| Year | Nominee / work | Award | Result | Ref. |
|---|---|---|---|---|
| 2005 | Herself | Best Foreign Male Act | Nominated | |

== Gay and Lesbian American Music Awards ==
The Gay & Lesbian American Music Awards spanned five years and provided the foundation for the recognition of the excellence of LGBT artists. The first awards covered an eligibility period of June 1, 1995, through May 31, 1996, with a ceremony held on October 6. Following awards covered the calendar year releases for 1997, 1998 and 1999, with ceremonies held on March 9, 1998, April 12, 1999, and April 22, 2000. Wainwright received one award from four nominations.

| Year | Nominated work | Award | Result | Ref. |
|---|---|---|---|---|
| 1998 | Rufus Wainwright | Best Debut Artist | Won | |
| 1998 | Rufus Wainwright | Album of the Year | Nominated | |
| 1998 | "April Fools" | Video of the Year | Nominated | |
| 1998 | "April Fools" | Pop Recording | Nominated | |

== Genie Awards ==
Genie Awards are given out annually to recognize the best of Canadian cinema by the Academy of Canadian Cinema and Television. Wainwright has been nominated once.

| Year | Nominated work | Award | Result | Ref. |
|---|---|---|---|---|
| 1989 | "I'm a-Runnin'" | Best Original Song | Nominated | |

== GLAAD Media Awards ==
The GLAAD Media Awards were created in 1990 by the Gay & Lesbian Alliance Against Defamation (GLAAD) to recognize and honor the mainstream media for their fair, accurate and inclusive representations of the LGBT community and the issues that affect their lives. Wainwright has received five awards from seven nominations.

| Year | Nominated work | Award | Result | Ref. |
|---|---|---|---|---|
| 1999 | Rufus Wainwright | Outstanding Music – Album | Won | |
| 2002 | Poses | Outstanding Music – Album | Won | |
| 2004 | Want One | Outstanding Music – Artist | Won | |
| 2005 | Want Two | Outstanding Music – Artist | Nominated | |
| 2008 | Rufus Wainwright | Stephen F. Kolzak Award | Won | |
| 2008 | Release the Stars | Outstanding Music – Artist | Won | |
| 2013 | Rufus Wainwright | Outstanding Music – Artist | Nominated | |

== GQ Awards ==
The annual GQ Men of the Year awards gives GQ magazine readers the chance to vote for the most influential figures in a variety of fields over the past year. Winners are chosen from nominees in the fields of film, television, sports, music, fashion, theatre, literature and food through online voting by GQ readers. Winners are typically featured in an issue of GQ, and honored at an annual "Men of the Year" awards show. Wainwright has been nominated once.

| Year | Nominated work | Award | Result | Ref. |
|---|---|---|---|---|
| 2001 | Rufus Wainwright | Music: Solo Artist of the Year | Nominated | |

== Grammy Awards ==
The Grammy Awards are awarded annually by the National Academy of Recording Arts and Sciences of the United States for outstanding achievements in the record industry. Often considered the highest music honor, the awards were established in 1958. Wainwright has received three nominations.

| Year | Nominated work | Award | Result | Ref. |
|---|---|---|---|---|
| 2009 | Rufus Does Judy at Carnegie Hall | Best Traditional Pop Vocal Album | Nominated | |
| 2021 | Unfollow the Rules | Best Traditional Pop Vocal Album | Nominated | |
| 2023 | Folkocracy | Best Folk Album | Nominated | |

== Helpmann Awards ==
The Helpmann Awards recognize distinguished artistic achievement and excellence in Australia's live performing arts sectors. Recognized disciplines include musical and physical theatre, contemporary and classical music, opera, and dance, with a comedy category introduced in 2006. The Helpmann Awards also incorporates the J. C. Williamson Award for outstanding contribution to the Australian entertainment industry. Wainwright has been nominated once.

| Year | Nominated work | Award | Result | Ref. |
|---|---|---|---|---|
| 2008 | Rufus Wainwright | Best International Contemporary Concert | Nominated | |

== Juno Awards ==
Juno Awards are presented annually to Canadian musical artists and bands to acknowledge their artistic and technical achievements in all aspects of music. Winners are currently chosen by members of the Canadian Academy of Recording Arts and Sciences or, depending on the award, a panel of experts. In almost all of the main general categories, such as Album of the Year or Artist of the Year, nominees are determined by sales during the qualifying period; in genre-specific categories, they are determined by panel. Wainwright has received two awards from seven nominations.

| Year | Nominated work | Award | Result | Ref. |
|---|---|---|---|---|
| 1990 | Rufus Wainwright | Most Promising Male Vocalist of the Year | Nominated | |
| 1999 | Rufus Wainwright | Best Alternative Album | Won | |
| 2002 | Poses | Best Alternative Album | Won | |
| 2002 | "Poses" / "Cigarettes and Chocolate Milk" / "Grey Gardens" | Best Songwriter | Nominated | |
| 2005 | Want Two | Adult Alternative Album of the Year | Nominated | |
| 2008 | Release the Stars | Adult Alternative Album of the Year | Nominated | |
| 2008 | "Going to a Town" / "Release the Stars" / "Do I Disappoint You" | Songwriter of the Year | Nominated | |
| 2021 | Unfollow the Rules | Adult Alternative Album of the Year | Nominated | |

== Meteor Music Awards ==
The Meteor Music Awards are distributed by MCD Productions and are the national music awards of Ireland. Wainwright has been nominated two times.

| Year | Nominated work | Award | Result | Ref. |
|---|---|---|---|---|
| 2006 | Rufus Wainwright | Best International Male | Nominated | |
| 2008 | Rufus Wainwright | Best International Male | Nominated | |

== MOJO Awards ==
MOJO Awards are awarded by the popular British music magazine, Mojo, published monthly by Bauer Media Group. Wainwright has been nominated three times.

| Year | Nominated work | Award | Result | Ref. |
|---|---|---|---|---|
| 2005 | Rufus Wainwright | Best New Act | Nominated | |
| 2008 | Rufus Wainwright | Best Live Act | Nominated | |
| 2010 | Rufus Wainwright | Best Live Act | Nominated | |

== OutMusic Awards ==
OutMusic is an organization that started with the objective to raise the awareness about openly gay and lesbian artists and their music. In 2001, the organization introduced the first annual OutMusic Awards to increase the popularity of LGBT musicians. Wainwright has received one award from two nominations.

| Year | Nominated work | Award | Result | Ref. |
|---|---|---|---|---|
| 2004 | Want One | Outstanding New Recording: Male | Won | |
| 2004 | Rufus Wainwright (Want One) | Outstanding Songwriter | Nominated | |

== Shortlist Music Prize ==
The Shortlist Music Prize is a music award given annually to an album released in the United States within the last year, as chosen by a panel of musicians, producers and journalists, known as the "Listmakers". Albums are eligible only if they have not been certified gold by the Recording Industry Association of America by the time of nomination. The Shortlist Music Prize was first given in 2001. Wainwright has been nominated once.

| Year | Nominated work | Award | Result | Ref. |
|---|---|---|---|---|
| 2004 | Want One | Shortlist Music Prize | Nominated | |

== Stonewall Awards ==
The Stonewall Awards is an annual event to celebrate people that have had a positive impact on the lives of British LGBT people. Wainwright has received one nomination.

| Year | Nominated work | Award | Result | Ref. |
|---|---|---|---|---|
| 2007 | Rufus Wainwright | Entertainer of the Year | Nominated | |

== Virgin Media Music Awards ==
| Year | Nominated work | Award | Result | Ref. |
|---|---|---|---|---|
| 2007 | Rufus Wainwright | Best International Act | Nominated | |

== Other recognitions ==
- 1998 – Rolling Stone magazine named Wainwright "Best New Artist" following the release of Rufus Wainwright
- 2006 – Both Want One and Want Two are included in Robert Dimery's book, 1001 Albums You Must Hear Before You Die
- 2006 – Out magazine titled Wainwright "Entertainer of the Year" in its December 2006 issue
- 2008 – Out magazine ranked Poses number 50 and Want One number 80 on its list of the "100 Greatest, Gayest Albums"
- 2009 – Paste ranked Want One number 16 and "Across the Universe" number 28 on its lists of the "50 best albums" and "30 best cover songs" of the decade
- 2009 – NME ranked Poses number 52 on its list of the "Top 100 Greatest Albums of the Decade"
- 2013 – CBC Music ranked Wainwright number 9 on its list of the "25 greatest Canadian singers ever"
