= First person =

First person most commonly refers to:

- First person, a grammatical person
  - First-person narrative, recounting events from the storyteller's personal point of view

First person or 1st Person may also refer to:

== Arts and entertainment ==
- "1st Person", a song by Stone Sour from the album Come What(ever) May, 2006
- First Person (radio program), an Australian radio program broadcast from 2002 to 2012
- First Person (1960 TV series), a Canadian drama series
- First Person (2000 TV series), an American television series
- First-person (video games), a graphical perspective rendered from the viewpoint of the player character

== Other uses ==
- First person (ethnic), indigenous peoples

== See also ==
- Category:Lists of firsts
- 1st Personnel Command, a command of United States Army Europe that existed from 1978 to 2008
- First Lady (disambiguation)
- First man (disambiguation)
- First Person Singular (disambiguation)
- First-person interpretation, the interactions of museum visitors with the past via actors and interpreters
- First-person shooter (disambiguation)
- First-person shooter engine, specialized for simulating 3D environments in a first-person shooter video game
- First-person view (disambiguation)
- First spouse, a gender-neutral term for the spouse of a state leader
- First woman (disambiguation)
- Princeps, a Latin word meaning "the first person"
- Second person (disambiguation)
- Third person (disambiguation)
- Vertiginous question
