= Prima Donna (disambiguation) =

Prima donna, Italian for "first lady", is a term used in opera.

Prima Donna or Primadonna may also refer to:

== Music ==
- The Prima Donna, a comic opera by Victor Herbert and Henry Blossom
- Prima Donna (American band), an American rock 'n' roll band
- Prima Donna (British band), a band that represented the United Kingdom in the Eurovision Song Contest 1980
- Prima Donna (opera), a 2009 opera by Rufus Wainwright
- Prima Donna: A Symphonic Visual Concert, a 2015 concert by Rufus Wainwright, based on his opera

=== Albums ===
- Prima Donna (Nine Muses album), 2013
- Prima Donna (Rufus Wainwright album), 2015
- Prima Donna (EP), by Vince Staples, 2016
- Prima Donna, a series of five albums by Leontyne Price, 1967–1978
- Prima Donna, by Lesley Garrett, 1992

=== Songs ===
- "Prima Donna" (Uriah Heep song), 1975
- "Primadonna" (Alla Pugacheva song), the Russian entry in the Eurovision Song Contest 1997
- "Primadonna" (Marina and the Diamonds song), 2012
- "Prima Donna", by Chevelle from Hats Off to the Bull, 2011
- "Prima Donna", by Chicago from Chicago 17, 1984
- "Prima Donna", by Christina Aguilera from Bionic, 2010
- "Prima Donna", by Hot Leg from Red Light Fever, 2009
- "Prima Donna", from the musical The Phantom of the Opera, 1986

== Other ==
- Prima Donna (cheese), a Dutch cheese brand
- Prima Donna (film), a 1959 Australian television play
- Prima Donnas, a 2019 Philippine TV drama series
- Primadonna, a defunct casino once located on the site of the Montage Reno, Nevada, US
- Primadonna, a 1956 typeface designed by the German foundry Ludwig & Mayer
- Primadonna, a supervillain in Kiya & the Kimoja Heroes

== See also ==
- "Donna the Prima Donna", a 1963 song by Dion
- First Lady (disambiguation)
- First woman (disambiguation)
- Pre-Madonna, a 1997 album by Madonna
- Prima Doner, a fictional takeaway shop on ITV1 soap opera Coronation Street, owned by Dev Alahan
- Primera dama (disambiguation)
