= Prima Donna: A Symphonic Visual Concert =

2015 concert by Rufus Wainwright

- Concert by Rufus Wainwright
- Promotional artwork for the program
- Orchestra: Hong Kong Philharmonic
- Composer: Rufus Wainwright
- Arranger: Rufus Wainwright
- Venue: Odeon of Herodes Atticus; Gulbenkian; Teatro Colón; Hong Kong Cultural Centre
- Associated album: Prima Donna
- Date(s): September 15, 2015; November 27, 2015; March 1, 2016
- No. of shows: 3

Prima Donna: A Symphonic Visual Concert is a music and visual concert inspired by American-Canadian singer-songwriter Rufus Wainwright's 2009 opera Prima Donna. The two-part program features a concert adaptation of the opera accompanied by a film directed by Francesco Vezzoli, produced by Petite Maison Production and featuring Cindy Sherman, followed by a performance of Wainwright singing well-known songs from his repertoire.

== Description ==
Prima Donna: A Symphonic Visual Concert is a 2015 program in two parts, inspired by Rufus Wainwright's 2009 opera Prima Donna. Wainwright "reconfigured" the opera's musical compositions and scheduled a tour to coincide with the release of the opera's studio recording of the same name. The first half is a 60-minute concert adaptation of the opera accompanied by a film conceived by Wainwright and directed by Italian artist and filmmaker Francesco Vezzoli. It features Cindy Sherman as the opera's main character, who was inspired by American-born Greek soprano Maria Callas, wearing Callas' actual costumes borrowed from the Rome-based costume suppliers Tirelli Costumi and Costumi d'Arte. The film, produced by Tessa Louise-Salomé and Solveig Rawas from Petite Maison Production was shot during Spring 2015. Main photography took place in Paris, at Théâtre des Variétés.

The program's second half features Wainwright performing popular songs from his repertoire with full orchestra accompaniment and special appearances by opera singers.

=== Performances ===
The program premiered at the Odeon of Herodes Atticus at the Athens Festival in Greece on September 15, 2015. It was performed at the Gulbenkian in Lisbon, Portugal on November 27, 2015, at the Teatro Colón in Buenos Aires, Argentina in February 2016, and at the Hong Kong Cultural Centre's Concert Hall as part of the Hong Kong Arts Festival on March 1, 2016. The latter performance marked Wainwright's Hong Kong debut and featured accompaniment by the Hong Kong Philharmonic.
