= First man or woman =

First man or woman, First man, First men, The First Man, or The First Men may refer to:

== People ==
- Protoplast (religion), legendary progenitors of humanity, including
  - Adam and Eve, the first people in Abrahamic mythology
  - Fuxi and Nüwa, the first people born in some Chinese myths
  - Swayambhuva Manu and Shatarupa, the first couple in Hindu mythology
- Early humans, including
  - Homo erectus, the first human species to evolve a humanlike body plan and movement

== Arts and entertainment ==
- "First Man" (song), by Camila Cabello from the album Romance, 2020
- First Man: The Life of Neil A. Armstrong, the official biography of Neil Armstrong, 2005
  - First Man (film), an adaptation of the biography, 2018
- The First Man, Albert Camus's unfinished final novel, 1994
  - The First Man (film), an adaptation of the novel, 2011
- First Men, the name of the extant human species in Olaf Stapledon's Last and First Men
- The First Men, a short story by Howard Fast, 1960
- The First Men, the initial human settlers of Westeros in the A Song of Ice and Fire series
- The First Man (TV series), a 2025–2026 South Korean television series

== See also ==
- Category:Lists of firsts
- Ancient humans (disambiguation)
- Dawn man (disambiguation)
- Early man (disambiguation)
- First Lady (disambiguation)
- First person (disambiguation)
- First woman (disambiguation)
- The First Men in the Moon (disambiguation)
- Best man, the chief assistant to the groom in a wedding
- Creator deity, gods responsible for the creation of the universe in religion
- First among equals, an honorary title for someone in a group accorded unofficial respect despite being a formal equal
- First gentleman, an unofficial title used for the male spouse of a state leader
- First Man into Space, a British-American science fiction-horror film, 1959
- List of first human settlements
- List of first minority male lawyers and judges in the United States
  - Thurgood Marshall (1908–1993), the first African American to serve on the Supreme Court of the United States
- List of LGBTQ firsts by year
- Princeps, a Latin word meaning "the first person"
- The First Man in Rome, a historical fiction novel by Colleen McCullough, 1990
- The Second Man, a crime novel by Edward Grierson, 1956
- Yuri Gagarin (1934–1968), the first man to journey into outer space
