= One Man Guy =

"One Man Guy" may refer to:

- "One Man Guy", a song on Loudon Wainwright III's 1985 album I'm Alright
  - "One Man Guy", a cover version on Rufus Wainwright's 2001 album Poses
- One Man Guy: The Best of Loudon Wainwright III 1982–1986, a 1994 compilation album by Loudon Wainwright III
- Essential Recordings: One Man Guy (Best of Rounder Records Perfect 10 Series), a 2009 compilation album by Loudon Wainwright III
