= Dawn man =

Dawn man may refer to:

- Piltdown Man, an early 20th-century paleoanthropological hoax
- Any archaic human species

== See also ==
- Dawn Man theory, theory inspired by the Piltdown Man
- Dawn's Men, a Neolithic stone circle in Cornwall, England
- Ancient humans (disambiguation)
- First man or woman (disambiguation)
