= Stage Beauty =

2004 film by Richard Eyre

- Theatrical release poster
- Directed by: Richard Eyre
- Screenplay by: Jeffrey Hatcher
- Based on: "Compleat Female Stage Beauty" by Jeffrey Hatcher
- Produced by: Robert De Niro; Hardy Justice; Jane Rosenthal
- Starring: Billy Crudup; Claire Danes; Rupert Everett; Tom Wilkinson; Ben Chaplin
- Cinematography: Andrew Dunn
- Edited by: Tariq Anwar
- Music by: George Fenton
- Production companies: Artisan Entertainment; Qwerty Films; TriBeCa Productions; Ni European Film Produktions-GmbH & Co. KG; BBC Films
- Distributed by: Senator Film (Germany); Momentum Pictures (United Kingdom); Lions Gate Films (United States)
- Release dates: 8 May 2004 (Tribeca Film Festival); 3 September 2004 (UK); 8 October 2004 (US)
- Running time: 109 minutes
- Countries: Germany; United Kingdom; United States
- Language: English
- Box office: $2.2 million

Stage Beauty is a 2004 romantic period drama directed by Richard Eyre. The screenplay by Jeffrey Hatcher is based on his play Compleat Female Stage Beauty, which was inspired by references to 17th-century actor Edward Kynaston made in the detailed private diary kept by Samuel Pepys.

== Plot ==
Ned Kynaston is one of the leading actors of his day, particularly famous for his portrayal of female characters, predominantly Desdemona in Othello. His dresser, Maria, aspires to perform in the legitimate theatre but is forbidden because of a law, at that time in effect, forbidding theatres to employ actresses. Instead, she appears in productions at a local tavern under the pseudonym Margaret Hughes. Her popularity is aided by the novelty of a woman acting in public, which attracts the attention of Sir Charles Sedley, who offers his patronage. Eventually, she is presented to Charles II.

Nell Gwynn, an aspiring actress and Charles II's mistress, comes upon Kynaston ranting about women on stage and seduces Charles II into banning men from playing female roles. Kynaston, having gone through a long and strenuous training to play female roles, finds himself without a guise by which to keep the attention of his lover, George Villiers, 2nd Duke of Buckingham, as the latter never had intentions to lead a homosexual life and Kynaston has lost the acceptance of London society which had started to circulate rumors about their association. He is reduced to performing bawdy songs in drag in music halls, while Maria's career thrives, although her ability to emulate Kynaston falls short because, as she says, Kynaston never fights as a woman would do.

Called upon for a royal performance, Maria panics and her friends implore Kynaston for coaching, during which she coaches him to develop his ability to regain a theatrical career in male roles. He agrees, with the proviso that he replace the company head Thomas Betterton in the role of Othello. Maria becomes a theatrical star.

== Cast ==
- Billy Crudup as Ned Kynaston
- Claire Danes as Maria / Margaret Hughes
- Tom Wilkinson as Thomas Betterton
- Rupert Everett as King Charles II
- Zoë Tapper as Nell Gwynn
- Richard Griffiths as Sir Charles Sedley
- Hugh Bonneville as Samuel Pepys
- Ben Chaplin as George Villiers, 2nd Duke of Buckingham
- Edward Fox as Sir Edward Hyde, 1st Earl of Clarendon
- Alice Eve as Miss Frayne
- Stephen Marcus as Thomas Cockerell
- Tom Hollander as Sir Peter Lely
- Fenella Woolgar as Lady Aurelia Meresvale

== Production ==
While the film is rooted in historical fact – the first English theatre actress, although her name is unknown, is believed to have performed the role of Desdemona – some liberties with the truth were taken. Nell Gwynne is represented as a mistress of the King who subsequently becomes an actress, but in reality she already was a noted theatre personality and actress when Charles II met her. The sequence in which Maria and Kynaston discover naturalistic acting is anachronistic, as naturalism was not developed until the 19th century.

Interiors were filmed at the Old Royal Naval College in Greenwich and Shepperton Studios in Surrey. According to commentary by production designer Jim Clay on the DVD release of the film, because so little English Restoration architecture remains in London, and documentation of the period is minimal, he was required to use his imagination in creating buildings and back alleys on sound stages.

In the DVD commentary, several cast members recall the film was shot during the hottest UK summer on record at the time (2003), and the temperature under the lights usually hovered at 46 °C (115 °F), making performing in the heavy, layered costumes a grueling experience.

The Costumes were designed by Tim Hatley. Twelve costume houses were involved in the production, including The Royal Shakespeare Company, The National Theater, and Angels & Bermans, as well as the Italian houses Sartoria Farani, Tirelli, Costumi d'Arte, E. Rancati, G.P. 11, and Pompei.

The film premiered at the Tribeca Film Festival in May 2004 prior to its general release in the UK. It was shown at the Deauville Film Festival, the Toronto International Film Festival, and the Dinard Festival of British Cinema in France before opening in New York City.

== Reception ==
On review aggregator website Rotten Tomatoes, the film holds an approval rating of 64% based on 128 reviews, with a weighted average of 6.5/10. The site's critical consensus reads: "Uneven but enjoyable, Stage Beauty uses historical events as the springboard for a well-acted romance with a charming Shakespearean spin." On Metacritic, the film has a weighted average score of 64 out of 100, based on 38 critics, indicating "generally favorable reviews".

In his review in The New York Times, A. O. Scott said, "At times, the movie feels like a fancy-dress version of A Star Is Born ... Mr. Crudup's fine features, which flicker between masculine and feminine as the lighting changes and the mood shifts, are well suited for the role, though his sinewy, birdlike frame suggests Hollywood anorexia more than Restoration curviness ... Stage Beauty is both timorous and ungainly, words that might also describe Ms. Danes's performance. Trapped in an English accent and in a character who must appear conniving and warmhearted in turn, she veers from teariness to brisk indignation like an Emma Thompson doll with a jammed switch. The British actors in smaller roles handle the material better ... George Fenton's Sunday-brunch score, on the other hand, is an indigestible dose of good taste ladled heavily over even the film's witty and delicate moments."

David Rooney of Variety called the film "an intelligent and entertaining adaptation ... skillfully acted, handsomely crafted" and added, "Eyre's spry direction of the refreshingly literate, witty drama shows a pleasingly light touch and a genuine feel for the bustle, backbiting and rivalry of the theater milieu ... In a delicately measured performance that favors graceful subtlety over campy mannerism, Crudup conveys a nuanced sense of a man struggling to know himself ... Put in the unenviable position of playing second fiddle to her male co-star in terms of feminine allure, Danes is lovely nonetheless ... George Fenton's rich orchestral score enlivens the action with an occasional rousing Celtic flavor."

In Rolling Stone, Peter Travers rated the film three out of a possible four stars and called it "bawdy fun ... the gender role-playing puts spine in this period piece that is vital to the here and now."

Carla Meyer of the San Francisco Chronicle said, "The film rarely matches Crudup's performance, appearing confused itself about whether it's farce or drama. But its palette of burnished browns and reds pleases the eye, and at its best, Stage Beauty captures the tensions and electricity of backstage dramas."

In The New Yorker, David Denby observed, "Second-rate bawdiness—that is, bawdiness without the wit of Boccaccio or Shakespeare or even Tom Stoppard—is more infantile than funny, and I'm not sure that the American playwright Jeffrey Hatcher, who concocted this piece for the stage and then adapted it into a movie, is even second-rate. Stage Beauty might be called the spawn of Shakespeare in Love, and, unfortunately, this is a Shakespeare that lacks the graceful spirit and breathless narrative drive of its progenitor."

Owen Gleiberman of Entertainment Weekly rated the film C+ and described it as "an odd amalgam of high spirits, lively ambition, and botched execution."

== Awards and nominations ==
The film won the Cambridge Film Festival Audience Award for Best Film, was cited by the National Board of Review for Excellence in Filmmaking, and was named the Overlooked Film of the Year by the Phoenix Film Critics Society.

== Adaptation ==
The film inspired Carlisle Floyd to write his opera The Prince of Players, thinking after watching it "Wow - it's all about a crisis in a man's life", and this propelled his creative process. The opera premiered on 5 March 2016 in at the Cullen Theater, Houston, using also Hatcher’s 1999 play.
