= First woman =

First woman, First women, or The First Woman may refer to:

== People ==
- Female legendary progenitors of mankind, including
  - Embla, the first woman in Norse mythology
  - Eve, the first woman in Abrahamic mythology
  - Iya Nla, in Yoruba mythology
  - Izanami, in Japanese mythology
  - Nüwa, in Chinese mythology
  - Pandora, the first woman in Greek mythology
  - Shatarupa, the first evolved human woman in Hindu mythology
- List of women's firsts
- Mitochondrial Eve, the matrilineal most recent common ancestor of all currently living humans

== Other uses ==
- First Woman, an American comic by NASA
- First Women, a British awards program
- The First Woman, a 1922 American silent film

== See also ==
- First Lady (disambiguation)
- First man (disambiguation)
- First person (disambiguation)
- First Women's Bank (disambiguation)
- Prima Donna (disambiguation)
- Primera dama (disambiguation)
- The Second Woman (disambiguation)
- Maid of honor, the chief attendant of the bride in a wedding
- Senior women in European royal households:
  - Camarera mayor de Palacio, in Spain
  - Chief Court Mistress, in various countries
  - Mistress of the Robes, in the United Kingdom
  - Première dame d'honneur and Surintendante de la Maison de la Reine, in France
- Lucy (hominid), a collection of fossilized bones of a female of a hominin species from 3.2 million years ago
