= Early man =

Early man may refer to:

- Human evolution
- Early Man (album), a 2000 album by Steve Roach
- Early Man (film), a 2018 Aardman Animations film
- Early Man (band), an American heavy metal band
  - Early Man (EP), their 2005 eponymous EP
- "Early Man", a 2012 Judge John Hodgman podcast episode

== See also ==
- Ancient humans (disambiguation)
- First man or woman (disambiguation)
