= Widows' Peak =

- Video release poster
- Directed by: John Irvin
- Written by: Hugh Leonard; Tim Hayes
- Produced by: Jo Manuel
- Starring: Mia Farrow; Joan Plowright; Natasha Richardson; Adrian Dunbar; Jim Broadbent
- Cinematography: Ashley Rowe
- Edited by: Peter Tanner
- Music by: Carl Davis
- Distributed by: Rank Film Distributors
- Release date: 13 May 1994
- Running time: 101 minutes
- Countries: Ireland; United Kingdom
- Languages: English; Irish
- Box office: $6.5 million (US/UK)

Widows' Peak is a 1994 British-Irish mystery film directed by John Irvin and starring Mia Farrow, Joan Plowright, Natasha Richardson, Adrian Dunbar and Jim Broadbent. The film is based on an original screenplay by Hugh Leonard and Tim Hayes.

Young Edwina Broome, an English war widow, moves into "Widows' Peak" in an Irish village and soon has a conflict with spinster Miss Katherine O'Hare which soon escalates, leaving the town in an uproar.

== Plot ==
In the 1920s, English war widow Mrs. Edwina Broome moves to the Irish village of Kilshannon, into the exclusive enclave derisively called "Widows' Peak" by the locals. Mrs. Doyle-Counihan, widowed twice, upholds with an iron will the rental terms for the property under her control—left to her by her deceased husband—as well as maintaining a tight grip on her adult son, Godfrey. The rental terms prohibit children under adulthood, males of any kind (with an exception for Godfrey), and married or single ladies (with the puzzling exception of Miss Katherine O’Hare).

An impoverished spinster with an outspoken dislike for the English, Katherine O'Hare runs a boarding house, yet is tolerated by the clique of snobbish wealthy widows. When Colin Clancy, the new dentist, becomes besotted with Katherine, Mrs. Doyle-Counihan warns her against past indiscretions.

At a welcome tea party for Edwina, Katherine shows antipathy toward her for being English, persistently prying into Edwina's reason for coming to Ireland. Edwina explains that after her husband's death she took a house in Antibes in the French Riviera, where she said she had to dodge fortune hunters. Mrs. Doyle-Counihan immediately targets the wealthy widow for her son Godfrey.

A series of hostile encounters leads to a feud between Katherine and Edwina, culminating in Edwina's claiming that Katherine tampered with her car, causing it to roll down a hill, narrowly missing her and Godfrey; and Katherine's claiming that Edwina purposely rammed into and damaged Katherine's boat during a regatta. Katherine insists that unbalanced Edwina staged events to implicate her and is planning to murder her.

At the regatta, Katherine encounters an English naval officer, whom she pumps for more information, who says he recognizes Edwina from Antibes. Determined to bring Katherine down, Edwina questions local gossip Maddy O’Hara and learns that Katherine had borne a baby out of wedlock. When Colin Clancy receives an anonymous letter informing him of Katherine's past, he breaks up with her.

Katherine retaliates by crashing Edwina's and Godfrey's engagement party, confessing that she had been pressured to give up her baby for adoption by the widows who claimed that her unmarried motherhood would be an offense to "good living women." As part of the bargain for giving up her baby, she had been provided a cottage in which to live. Katherine then announces that the naval officer at the regatta had recognized Edwina from a brothel in Antibes. Investigating further, Katherine learned that Edwina is an impostor, not the real Mrs. Edwina Broome, whose letter she brandishes. Edwina admits the accusations and promptly leaves.

Shortly afterward, Edwina is seen confronting Katherine aboard her boat, and the two women are seen physically struggling. Subsequently, Edwina is found alone on the boat and Katherine goes missing for days. Led by Mrs. Doyle-Counihan, local gossips accuse Edwina of having killed Katherine. Questioned by police, Edwina is unable to give an explanation beyond saying that Katherine just left. When Katherine's purse is found in the water, Edwina says Katherine just dropped her purse in the water as she left. Eventually Mrs. Doyle-Counihan publicly proclaims that Edwina murdered Katherine and spreads hand-bills demanding that Edwina be tried and hanged. During a public meeting to demand justice, Katherine shows up, claiming that she left Edwina on the boat and has been staying with her cousin as a refuge from the scandals at Widows’ Peak. Deciding to move in with her cousin, she had returned to sell her boat and only then learned of the accusations of her murder.

Edwina's lawyer now files a hefty defamation lawsuit against Mrs. Doyle-Counihan and several others who falsely proclaimed her a murderer. Mrs. Doyle-Counihan consoles herself that Godfrey will always be there for her. Godfrey is next seen fleeing with a suitcase toward his boat.

The scene now cuts to a lavish nightclub where Colin Clancy greets the stylishly dressed “Mrs. Clancy”—the former Katherine O’Hare. “Edwina”, her grown baby, is there with her husband—the “naval officer” who told the story of Edwina being a prostitute in Antibes. The four of them have pulled off a lucrative scam to take financial revenge on the judgmental widows who have treated Katherine and her baby so harshly.

== Cast ==
- Mia Farrow as Miss Katherine O'Hare
- Joan Plowright as Mrs. Doyle-Counihan
- Natasha Richardson as Mrs. Edwina Broome
- Adrian Dunbar as Godfrey Doyle-Counihan
- Jim Broadbent as Con Clancy
- Anne Kent as Miss Grubb
- John Kavanagh as Canon Murtagh
- Rynagh O'Grady as Maddie O'Hara
- Gerard McSorley as Gaffney

== Production notes ==
The film was mainly shot on location in the counties of Wicklow, Dublin and Kilkenny. The house used during production was that of Stonehurst, Killiney Hill Road, County Dublin. The concept for the film came from its co-producer Prudence Farrow. While it had been intended for her mother Maureen O'Sullivan to play the role of Miss O'Hare, the part went to O'Sullivan's daughter and Prudence's sister Mia Farrow. O'Sullivan declined the part due to her advanced age and dwindling stamina.

Set in the 1920s, the film's period wardrobe needs were handled by Angels and Bermans as well as Costumi d'Arte and European Costume Company. Consolata Boyle was the costume designer.

== Reception ==
The film was well received by critics and the public. On the review aggregator website Rotten Tomatoes, 94% of 17 critics' reviews are positive, with an average rating of 7.1/10. Roger Ebert of the Chicago Sun-Times said, the film "uses understated humor and fluent, witty speech; it's a delight to listen to, as it gradually reveals how eccentric these apparently respectable people really are."

The film did poorly in the United Kingdom and Ireland grossing £0.2 million ($0.3 million). In the United States and Canada it opened on 40 screens and grossed $133,084 in its opening weekend, however, $90,000 of that came from the United States, where it was playing on just 9 screens. After 10 days it had grossed $1.5 million in the United States and Canada, where it eventually grossed $6.2 million.

== Awards ==
In 1995, the actress Natasha Richardson received the Crystal Globe award at the Karlovy Vary International Film Festival, Czech Republic, for her role in this film. The director, John Irvin, was also nominated for this award. It received the best picture award at the 1995 Austin Film Festival.

== Year-end lists ==
- 8th – Peter Rainer, Los Angeles Times
- 8th – Sean P. Means, The Salt Lake Tribune
- 9th – Douglas Armstrong, The Milwaukee Journal
- Top 10 (listed alphabetically, not ranked) – Jimmy Fowler, Dallas Observer
- Top 10 Runner-ups – Bob Ross, The Tampa Tribune
- Best "sleepers" (not ranked) – Dennis King, Tulsa World
- Honorable mention – Glenn Lovell, San Jose Mercury News
- Honorable mention – Todd Anthony, Miami New Times
- Honorable mention – Duane Dudek, Milwaukee Sentinel
- Honorable mention – Bob Carlton, The Birmingham News

== References in popular culture ==
- The character Doug from the TV series of the same name referenced the film in a daydream where he was a bodybuilder.
- The character Blossom Russo from the show Blossom goes to see Widow's Peak with her stepmother Carol in the episode "Writing the Wrongs".
