= Ladies First =

Ladies First may refer to:

== Film ==
- Ladies First, a 1918 film directed by Hampton Del Ruth
- Ladies First, a 2013 film Hebrew-language stand-up comedy film including Riki Blich
- Ladies First, a 2014 film Hindi-language film directed by Ashok Mehta
- Ladies First (2017 film), an Indian documentary on the life of archer Deepika Kumari
- Ladies First (2026 film), an American film directed by Thea Sharrock

== Television ==
- "Ladies First", a 2013 TV episode of The Ultimate Fighter
- "Ladies First", a 2005 TV episode of the Music Makers
- Ladies First: A Story of Women in Hip-Hop, a 2023 documentary series about women in hip-hop

== Music ==
- Ladies First (group), a UK garage group
- Ladies First (Ms Scandalous album)
- Ladies First (musical), 1918 Broadway musical at the Broadhurst Theatre by A. Baldwin Sloane and Harry B. Smith
- Verizon Ladies First Tour, a concert tour
- Ladies First!, a classical album of Haydn arias by Lisa Larsson
- "Ladies First", a song by Queen Latifah and Monie Love from All Hail the Queen

== Other uses ==
- Ladies First: Revelations of a Strong Woman, a 2000 memoir by Queen Latifah
- Ladies First Cup, an invitational international women's football competition held in Calais, France

== See also ==
- First Ladies
- First Lady (disambiguation)
