= First-person view =

First-person view may refer to:

- First-person view (remote control)
- First-person view (video games)
- First-person view (storytelling)
- First-person view (film)

== See also ==
- First person (disambiguation)
