= Nicolao Atelier =

Costume manufacturer and supply house

Nicolao Atelier is a costume manufacturer and supply house based in Venice, Italy. The company has created costumes for the films Farinelli, The Wings of the Dove, Elizabeth, The Merchant of Venice and Casanova.
