= Rufus Wainwright: Live from the Artists Den =

Live album by Rufus Wainwright
- Released: March 3, 2014
- Recorded: May 17, 2012 at the Church of the Ascension in Greenwich Village, New York City
- Label: Artists Den; Universal Music Enterprises

Rufus Wainwright chronology
Vibrate: The Best of Rufus Wainwright (2014)	Rufus Wainwright: Live from the Artists Den (2014)	Prima Donna (2015)

Rufus Wainwright: Live from the Artists Den is a live album by American-Canadian singer-songwriter Rufus Wainwright, released by Artists Den Records and Universal Music Enterprises on March 3, 2014. The album was recorded at a concert on May 17, 2012 at the Church of the Ascension in Greenwich Village, New York City, which was originally filmed for the PBS program Live from the Artists Den.

Live from the Artists Den features sixteen tracks, including five that did not air in the broadcast. Ten songs are from Out of the Game (2012), Wainwright's seventh studio album. The album also includes two songs from Want Two (2004) and one song each from Want One (2003) and Release the Stars (2007). Also featured are songs written by Wainwright's parents: "One Man Guy" (Loudon Wainwright III) originally appeared on I'm Alright (1985) and was recorded for Wainwright's second studio album, Poses (2001); "On My Way to Town" (Kate McGarrigle) is from Kate & Anna McGarrigle's album Love Over and Over (1982). Mark Ronson, who produced Out of the Game, is featured on guitar on "Bitter Tears".

Details of the album emerged in January 2014. The recording was released in CD, digital and Blu-ray Disc formats, the latter of which will contain 50 minutes of bonus footage.

== Composition ==
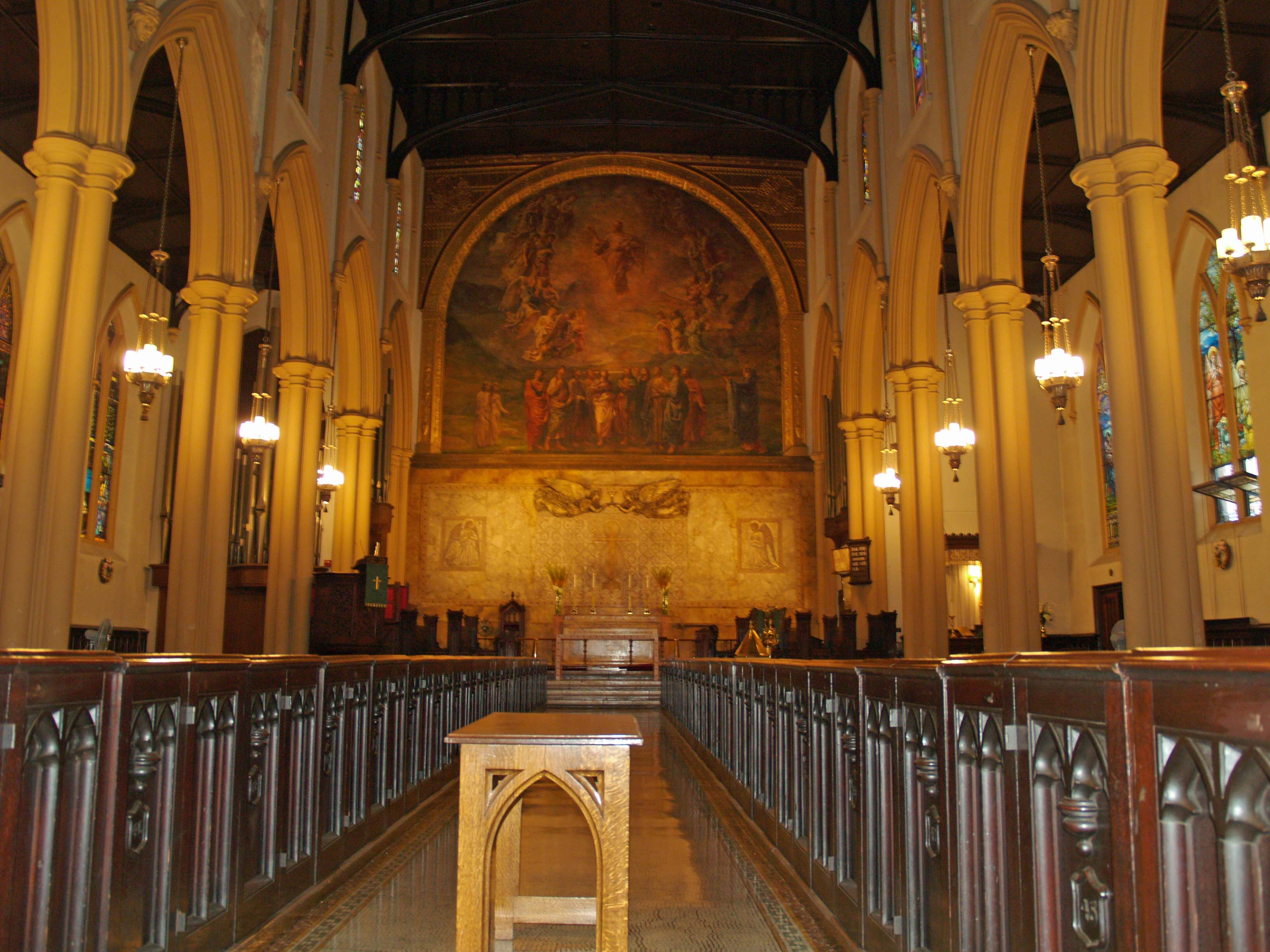
Interior of the Church of the Ascension (pictured in 2007), where the album was recorded.

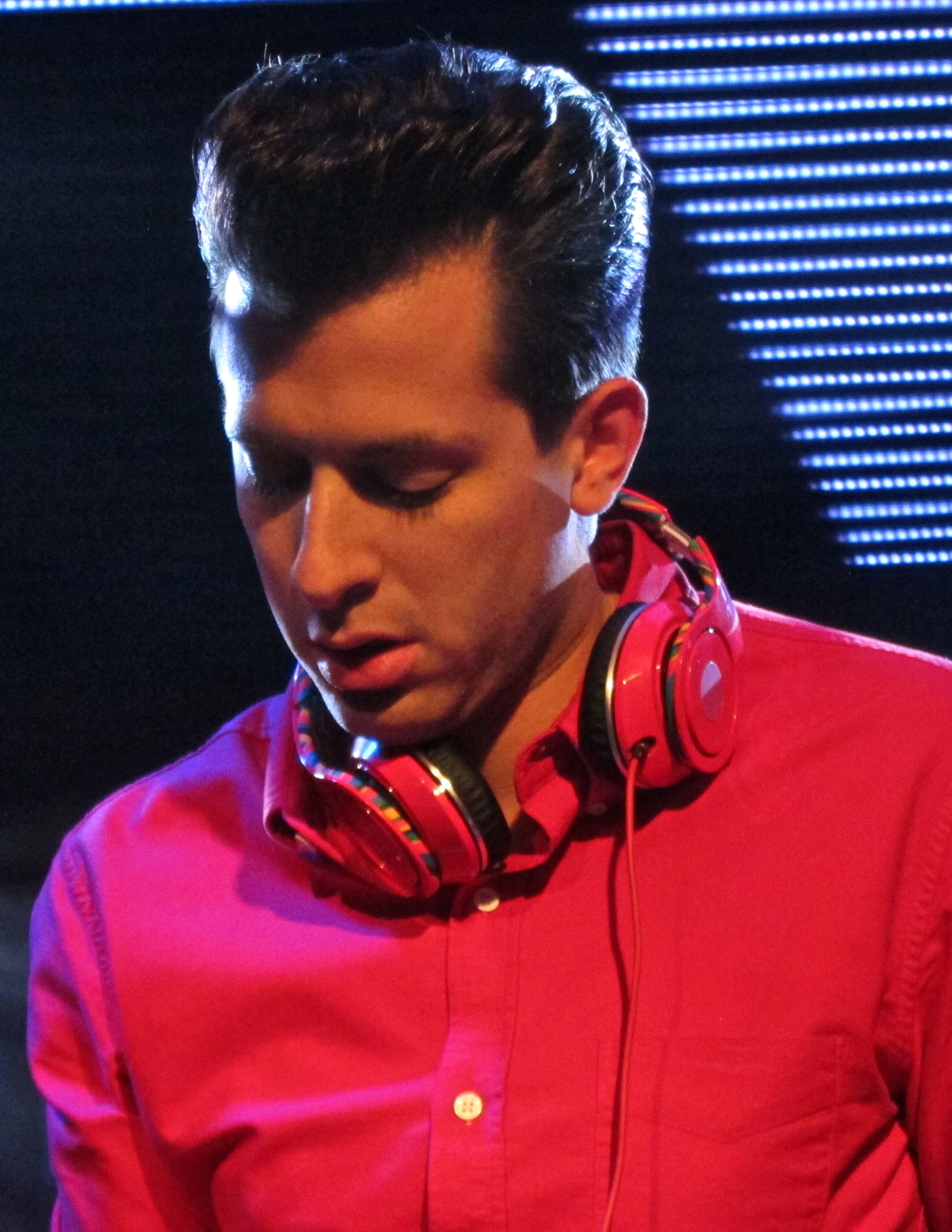
Mark Ronson (pictured in 2012) performs guitar on "Bitter Tears".

Rufus Wainwright: Live from the Artists Den was recorded on May 17, 2012 at a private concert at the Church of the Ascension in Greenwich Village, New York City. The concert was filmed and recorded for the PBS program Live from the Artists Den. Constructed in 1841, the Church of the Ascension is a National Historic Landmark, located at the intersection of Fifth Avenue and Tenth Street. Wainwright said of performing in the church: "I've found that the venue essentially dictates everything. For someone who is pretty focused on the capabilities of the voice, as I am, churches are our friends." The album features sixteen tracks, including five songs that did not air in the broadcast.

An a cappella rendition of "Candles", the closing track from Wainwright's Out of the Game (2012), serves as the album's opener. Other songs from Out of the Game include "Rashida", "Song of You", "Barbara", "Welcome to the Ball", "Respectable Dive", "Jericho", the title track ("Out of the Game"), "Montauk" and "Bitter Tears". "The One You Love" and "The Art Teacher" appeared on Wainwright's fourth studio album, Want Two (2004). "One Man Guy", written by Wainwright's father Loudon Wainwright III, originally appeared on I'm Alright (1985) and was recorded for Wainwright's second studio album, Poses (2001). "Going to a Town" and "14th Street" originally appeared on Wainwright's fifth and third studio albums, Release the Stars (2007) and Want One (2003), respectively. "On My Way to Town", written by Wainwright's mother Kate McGarrigle, originally appeared on Kate & Anna McGarrigle's album Love Over and Over (1982). Wainwright's emotional, solo piano performance of the song paid tribute to his mother, who died of clear-cell sarcoma in January 2010. For the "disco-flavored" rendition of "Bitter Tears", Wainwright was accompanied by Mark Ronson, who produced Out of the Game, on guitar.

The album was released in CD, digital and Blu-ray Disc formats, the latter featuring 50 minutes of "behind-the-scenes" bonus content, including interviews with Wainwright and Father Andrew (the church's since-retired rector), shoot and location footage, and a slideshow called "Night in Pictures".

== Promotion ==
Details of the album were released in January 2014. In a press release issued by Universal, Mark Lieberman, creator and executive producer of Live from the Artists Den, said of Wainwright's performance: "Rufus Wainwright is amongst the finest performers of our time. His 'Artists Den' secret show at the Church of the Ascension is still one of my favorite nights, a rare moment in the illustrious career of this incredible musician."

== Track listing ==
No.	Title	Writer(s)	Length
1.	"Candles" (from Out of the Game, 2012)	Rufus Wainwright
2.	"Rashida" (from Out of the Game, 2012)	Wainwright
3.	"Song of You" (from Out of the Game, 2012)	Wainwright
4.	"Barbara" (from Out of the Game, 2012)	Wainwright
5.	"Welcome to the Ball" (from Out of the Game, 2012)	Wainwright
6.	"The One You Love" (from Want Two, 2004)	Wainwright
7.	"Respectable Dive" (from Out of the Game, 2012)	Wainwright
8.	"Jericho" (from Out of the Game, 2012)	Wainwright
9.	"Out of the Game" (from Out of the Game, 2012)	Wainwright
10.	"One Man Guy" (from I'm Alright, 1985 and Poses, 2001)	Loudon Wainwright III
11.	"Going to a Town" (from Release the Stars, 2007)	Wainwright
12.	"Montauk" (from Out of the Game, 2012)	Wainwright
13.	"14th Street" (from Want One, 2003)	Wainwright
14.	"The Art Teacher" (from Want Two, 2004)	Wainwright
15.	"On My Way to Town" (from Love Over and Over, 1982)	Kate McGarrigle
16.	"Bitter Tears" (from Out of the Game, 2012)	Wainwright

Track listing adapted from the Fort Mill Times.

== Personnel ==
- Rufus Wainwright – vocals, guitar, piano
- Teddy Thompson – vocals, guitar
- Krystle Warren and Charysse Blackman – vocals
- Sharief Hobley – guitar
- Tim Ries – horns
- Andy Burton – keyboard
- Brad Albetta – bass
- Ben Perowsky – drums
- Mark Ronson – guitar (track 16)

== Release history ==
Region	Date	Label	Format	Ref.
United Kingdom	March 3, 2014	Universal	CD, digital, Blu-ray Disc	
Spain	March 4, 2014	Universal Music Spain	CD, digital, Blu-ray Disc	
United States	March 4, 2014	Universal Music Enterprises	CD, digital, Blu-ray Disc	
