= Northern Songs: Canada's Best and Brightest =

Compilation album by Various artists
- Released: September 2, 2008
- Genre: Various
- Label: Rhino/Hear Music

Northern Songs: Canada's Best and Brightest is a compilation album of songs performed by some of Canada's "best and brightest" musicians, released in September 2008 under Rhino Records and sold exclusively at Starbucks locations through their Hear Music label.

== Track listing ==
1. Feist - "Mushaboom"
2. Pilot Speed - "Knife-Gray Sea"
3. Cowboy Junkies - "Sweet Jane" (originally by The Velvet Underground)
4. The Band - "The Weight"
5. k.d. lang - "Constant Craving"
6. Rufus Wainwright - "Cigarettes and Chocolate Milk"
7. Sarah McLachlan - "Angel"
8. Ron Sexsmith - "All in Good Time"
9. Kate & Anna McGarrigle - "Entre Lajeunesse et la Sagesse"
10. Great Lake Swimmers - "Your Rocky Spine"
11. The Be Good Tanyas - "Ootischenia"
12. Broken Social Scene - "Swimmers"
13. Holly Cole - "I Can See Clearly Now" (originally by Johnny Nash)
14. Diana Krall - "Temptation" (originally by Tom Waits)
15. Leonard Cohen - "Anthem"
