= Casanova (2005 film) =

- Theatrical release poster
- Directed by: Lasse Hallström
- Written by: Kimberly Simi; Michael Cristofer; Jeffrey Hatcher
- Produced by: Betsy Beers; Mark Gordon
- Starring: Heath Ledger; Sienna Miller; Jeremy Irons; Oliver Platt; Lena Olin
- Cinematography: Oliver Stapleton
- Edited by: Andrew Mondshein
- Music by: Alexandre Desplat
- Production companies: Touchstone Pictures; Hallstorm/Holleran Productions; The Mark Gordon Company
- Distributed by: Buena Vista Pictures Distribution
- Release dates: September 3, 2005 (VFF); December 25, 2005 (United States)
- Running time: 112 minutes
- Country: United States
- Language: English
- Box office: $37.7 million

Casanova is a 2005 American romance film directed by Lasse Hallström starring Heath Ledger and loosely based on the life of Giacomo Casanova. The film premiered September 3, 2005, at the Venice Film Festival before being released by Buena Vista Pictures Distribution on December 25, 2005. It received mixed reviews and grossed $37.7 million at the box office.

== Plot ==
A young woman tearfully leaves her son to live with his grandmother and promises to return to him someday. Several years later, in 1753, in Venice, Casanova is notorious for his promiscuity with women, his adventures being represented in puppet theatres around the city. The Doge, the ruler of the city, is a friend to Casanova, but cannot be too lenient on him as he wishes to avoid trouble with the Church. He warns Casanova to marry soon, or he will be exiled from the city. Casanova gets engaged to Victoria, famous for her virginity, to save himself from exile.

Casanova later meets and falls in love with Francesca Bruni, who writes illegal feminist books under a male pseudonym, Bernardo Guardi, and also argues for women's rights as Dr. Giordano de Padua. Francesca mistakes Casanova's name for Lupo Salvato (Casanova's servant) and Casanova humors her since she despises the ill-reputed Casanova. Francesca and her mother are heavily in debt, and her mother pressures her to marry rich Paprizzio from Genoa, a union arranged by her late father. When Paprizzio arrives in Venice, Casanova lies to him and says that the hotel he booked is closed and he persuades him to stay at his house. Casanova also lies and says that he is indeed Bernardo Guardi. While Paprizzio asks his advice on how to impress Francesca, Casanova lures him to stay at home while receiving treatment for weight loss. Casanova visits Francesca, pretending to be Paprizzio and tells her that he lied to her before to make sure she is not in love with someone else and marrying him only for his money. Francesca is initially suspicious but gradually begins to trust him.

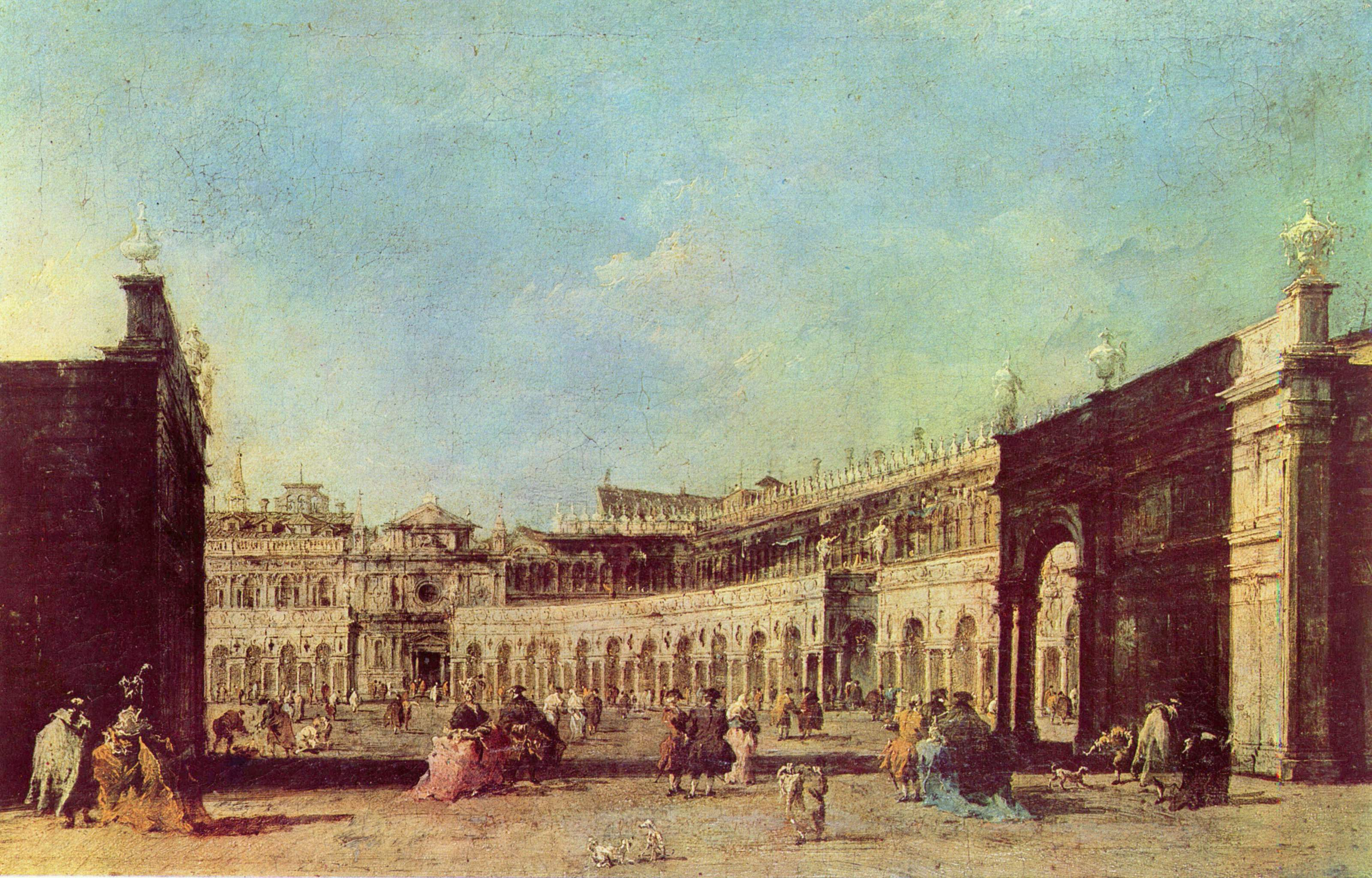
Piazza San Marco, Francesco Guardi, 18th century.

During the Venetian Carnival, Francesca recognizes the real Paprizzio from his publicity posters which force Casanova to confess his true identity making her angry. Casanova is arrested by the Venetian Inquisition for crimes against sexual morality, such as debauchery, heresy, and fornication with a novice. He saves Francesca by pretending to be Bernardo Guardi, which cools her anger. At his trial, Francesca confesses that she is the real Bernardo Guardi, and both are sentenced to death. Meanwhile, Francesca's mother and the real Paprizzio fall in love.

Just as Casanova and Francesca are about to be hanged in the Piazza San Marco, they are saved by an announcement that the Pope gave amnesty to all prisoners who were to be executed on that day, as it was the Pope's birthday. It is later discovered that the "Cardinal" who gave the announcement was actually an impostor who happens to be Casanova's stepfather, wedded to his long-lost mother who came back for him just as she promised when Casanova was a child.

As they all escape on Paprizzio's boat, Francesca's brother, Giovanni, stays behind to marry Victoria and to continue Casanova's legendary womanizing. The real Casanova spends the rest of his life as a stage actor touring with his family and the Paprizzios.

== Cast ==
- Heath Ledger as Giacomo Casanova
- Sienna Miller as Francesca Bruni
- Jeremy Irons as Bishop Pucci
- Oliver Platt as Paprizzio
- Lena Olin as Andrea Bruni, mother of Francesca
- Omid Djalili as Lupo Salvatore
- Stephen Greif as Donato
- Ken Stott as Dalfonso
- Tim McInnerny as Francesco Loredan, the Doge of Venice
- Helen McCrory as Zanetta Farussi
- Charlie Cox as Giovanni Bruni
- Natalie Dormer as Victoria Donato
- Philip Davis as Guardi
- Lauren Cohan as Sister Beatrice
- Eugene Simon as Casanova aged 11

== Production ==
Director Lasse Hallström had long wanted to make a film about Casanova but postponed the project to make An Unfinished Life with Robert Redford. The script was originally written by Kimberly Simi. It was later redrafted by Michael Cristofer. Tom Stoppard gave the script an uncredited polish. Producer Leslie Holleran also polished the script.

Filming began on July 9, 2004, and the finished film was released in the United States on September 3, 2005. Visual effects for the film were produced by Custom Film Effects and Illusion Arts. Period costumes were supplied by four different Italian costume houses: Tirelli Costumi, Nicolao Atelier, Costumi d'Arte, and G.P. 11, and shoes were manufactured by L.C.P. di Pompei. Wardrobe was also rented from Sastreria Cornejo of Spain.

The film was shot on location in Venice. Additional scenes were filmed in Vicenza, particularly the Teatro Olimpico, the Renaissance theater known for its intricate forced perspective stage design. The hot air balloon scene was created using Computer Generated Imagery (CGI).

== Music ==
- Assagio No. 1 in G Minor (Andante), composed by Johan Helmich Roman
- Concerto à 5, Op. 9 No. 10 in F Major for Violin, Strings & Continuo (2. Adagio), composed by Tomaso Albinoni
- Concerto à 5, Op. 9 No. 4 in A Major for Violin, Strings & Continuo (2. Adagio), composed by Tomaso Albinoni
- Concerto à 5, Op. 9 No. 2 in D Minor for Oboe, Strings & Continuo (1. Allegro e non presto), composed by Tomaso Albinoni
- Concerto à 5, Op. 9 No. 6 in G Major for 2 Oboes, Strings & Continuo (3. Allegro), composed by Tomaso Albinoni
- Tambourins I/II from the tragédie lyrique Dardanus, composed by Jean-Philippe Rameau
- Overture from the tragédie lyrique Zoroastre, composed by Jean-Philippe Rameau
- Air Grave from the tragédie lyrique Zoroastre, composed by Jean-Philippe Rameau
- Menuetts 1 & 2 from the tragédie lyrique Zoroastre, composed by Jean-Philippe Rameau
- Air Gai from the opéra-ballet Le temple de la Gloire, composed by Jean-Philippe Rameau
- Overture from the opéra-ballet Le temple de la Gloire, composed by Jean-Philippe Rameau
- Overture from the opéra-ballet Les fêtes de Polymnie, composed by Jean-Philippe Rameau
- Overture from the comédie-ballet Platée, composed by Jean-Philippe Rameau
- Gavotte from the opéra-ballet Les Indes galantes, composed by Jean-Philippe Rameau
- Rigaudons en Rondeau from the opéra-ballet Les Indes galantes, composed by Jean-Philippe Rameau
- Overture from the pastorale Acante et Céphise, composed by Jean-Philippe Rameau
- Ballet Figure (1st Gavotte) from the pastorale Naïs, composed by Jean-Philippe Rameau
- Overture from the pastorale Naïs, composed by Jean-Philippe Rameau
- Overture from the pastorale Zaïs, composed by Jean-Philippe Rameau
- Cello Concerto No. 3 in D Minor (2. Amoroso), composed by Leonardo Leo
- Concerto in C Major for Mandolin, Strings & Continuo (1. Allegro), composed by Antonio Vivaldi
- Concerto in D Major for Lute, 2 Violins & Continuo (3. Allegro), composed by Antonio Vivaldi
- Sinfonia from the opera Farnace, composed by Antonio Vivaldi
- Violin Concerto Il cimento dell'armonia e dell'invenzione, Op. 8, No. 11 in D Major (2. Largo), composed by Antonio Vivaldi
- Concerto for 2 Violins, Cello & Strings L'estro armonico, Op. 3, No. 2 in G Minor (1. Adagio e spiccato), composed by Antonio Vivaldi
- Harpsichord Concerto in B Flat Major (2. Grave), composed by Francesco Durante
- Harpsichord Concerto in B Flat Major (1. Allegro non troppo), composed by Francesco Durante
- Concerto for 2 Violins, Viola & Continuo No. 8 in A major La Pazzia (1. Allegro), composed by Francesco Durante
- Concerto in C Major No. 1 for Harpsichord & Strings (2. Larghetto, 3. Rondo), composed by Giovanni Paisiello
- Overture from La Madrilena, composed by Vicente Martín y Soler
- Casanova's Lament, traditional music, original lyrics by Björn Ulvaeus, performed by Tommy Körberg
- Sonata for Violin & Continuo, Op. 5 No. 11 in E Major (5. Gavotta - Allegro), composed by Arcangelo Corelli
- Sonata for Violin & Continuo, Op. 5 No. 7 in D Minor (3. Sarabanda - Largo), composed by Arcangelo Corelli
- Bourée from Plaisirs Champêtres, composed by Jean-Féry Rebel
- Tastar de Corde, Recercar Dietro, composed by Joan Ambrosio Dalza and performed by Christopher Wilson and Shirley Rumsey
- Rigaudon from Water Music, Suite No. 3 in G Major, composed by Georg Friedrich Händel
- Bourée from Music for the Royal Fireworks, composed by Georg Friedrich Händel
- Loure from Tafelmusik 1, composed by Georg Philipp Telemann
- Bella Gioiosa, composed by Fabritio Caroso

== Reception ==
On Rotten Tomatoes the film has a score of 45% based on reviews from 136 critics. The site's consensus states: "This frothy, oddly bloodless film does a disservice to the colorful life of the real Casanova." On Metacritic it has a score of 57% based on reviews from 36 critics, indicating "mixed or average" reviews. Audiences surveyed by CinemaScore gave the film a grade "B" on scale of A to F.

Roger Ebert of the Chicago Sun-Times gave it 2 out of 4 and wrote: "That the new Casanova lacks such wit is fatal. Heath Ledger is a good actor but Hallstrom's film is busy and unfocused, giving us the view of Casanova's ceaseless activity but not the excitement. It's a sitcom when what is wanted is comic opera." A.O. Scott of The New York Times called it "a delightful respite from awards-season seriousness" and rated it 4 out of 5.
