= Primera dama =

Primera dama may refer to:

- Primera dama (Chilean TV series), a Chilean telenovela
- The First Lady (Colombian TV series) (Spanish title: Primera dama), a Colombian telenovela

== See also ==
- First Lady (disambiguation)
- First woman (disambiguation)
- Prima Donna (disambiguation)
