= Amália Traïda =

2004 film

- Film poster
- Directed by: Francesco Vezzoli
- Written by: Francesco Vezzoli
- Starring: Lauren Bacall; Sônia Braga
- Release date: 2004
- Running time: 10 minutes
- Country: Italy
- Language: English

Amália Traïda (Portuguese: Amalia Betrayed) is a 2004 Italian black-and-white short film directed by Francesco Vezzoli and starring Lauren Bacall and Sônia Braga.

== Plot ==
The movie is a biopic about Portuguese fadista (fado singer) and actress Amália Rodrigues.

== Cast ==
- Lauren Bacall as TV Announcer
- Sônia Braga as Amália Rodrigues
