= Prima Donna (Rufus Wainwright album) =

Studio album by Rufus Wainwright
- Released: September 11, 2015
- Genre: Opera
- Label: Deutsche Grammophon (Universal Music Group)

Rufus Wainwright chronology
Rufus Wainwright: Live from the Artists Den (2014)	Prima Donna (2015)	Take All My Loves: 9 Shakespeare Sonnets (2016)

Prima Donna is a double album recording of Rufus Wainwright's 2009 opera of the same name, released internationally by the German classical record label Deutsche Grammophon (Universal Music Group) on September 11, 2015 and on October 2, 2015 in Canada, Mexico, and the United States. The recording features performances by Janis Kelly, Kathryn Guthrie, Antonio Figueroa and Richard Morrison, with Jayce Ogren conducting the BBC Symphony Orchestra. The album's release coincided with Prima Donna: A Symphonic Visual Concert.

== Reception ==
Robert Levine of Classics Today gave the quality of the recording a rating of 8 out of 10.

== Track listing ==
Disc 1 (Act 1)
No.	Title	Length
1.	"Overture" (BBC Symphony Orchestra, Jayce Ogren)	6:07
2.	"Scene 1: 'Oh! Madame Saint Laurent !'" (Janis Kelly, Kathryn Guthrie, BBC Symphony Orchestra, Ogren)	3:01
3.	"Scene 2: Aria 'J'ai rêvé toute la nuit'" (Kelly, BBC Symphony Orchestra, Ogren)	2:59
4.	"Scene 3: 'Merci. Asseyez-vous'"	1:38
5.	"Scene 4: 'Ah ! Les soucis !'" (Kelly, Guthrie, BBC Symphony Orchestra, Ogren)	1:10
6.	"Scene 5: 'Aliénor, quelle femme merveilleuse'" (Kelly, BBC Symphony Orchestra, Ogren)	1:50
7.	"Scene 6: 'Mais non, Madame'" (Kelly, Guthrie, BBC Symphony Orchestra, Ogren)	2:51
8.	"Scene 7: 'Mais que se passe-t-il donc'" (Kelly, Guthrie, Richard Morrison, BBC Symphony Orchestra, Ogren)	1:59
9.	"Scene 8: 'À l'époque, François, avant'"	2:15
10.	"Scene 9: 'Cet appartement'"	1:32
11.	"Scene 10: 'Mon dieu qu'il est laid !'"	2:06
12.	"Scene 11: 'À ton âge, François'" (Morrison, BBC Symphony Orchestra, Ogren)	2:42
13.	"Scene 12: 'Voici le journaliste !'" (Antonio Figueroa, Morrison, BBC Symphony Orchestra, Ogren)	2:25
14.	"Scene 13: 'Bonjour, Madame Saint Laurent'"	2:14
15.	"Scene 14: 'Quand j'étais jeune étudiant'"	3:10
16.	"Scene 15: 'Madame Saint Laurent'" (Kelly, Figueroa, BBC Symphony Orchestra, Ogren)	1:15
17.	"Scene 16: 'La Première'" (Kelly, Guthrie, Figueroa, Morrison, BBC Symphony Orchestra, Ogren)	2:32
18.	"Scene 17: 'Régine quelle majesté'"	3:14
19.	"Scene 18: 'Abandonne, pose ta couronne'"	3:05
20.	"Scene 19: 'Charmant, tout à fait'" (Kelly, Figueroa, BBC Symphony Orchestra, Ogren)	2:10
21.	"Scene 20: 'Oh, ma voix !'" (Kelly, Guthrie, Morrison, BBC Symphony Orchestra, Ogren)	0:59
22.	"Scene 21: 'Oh ma douleur !'" (Kelly, Guthrie, Figueroa, Morrison, BBC Symphony Orchestra, Ogren)	5:17
23.	"'Revenez donc ce soir' – Scene 22: Interlude" (Figueroa, Morrison, BBC Symphony Orchestra, Ogren)	1:55
24.	"Scene 23: The Kiss" (BBC Symphony Orchestra, Ogren)	1:15
Total length:		59:41

Disc 2 (Act 2)
No.	Title	Length
1.	"Overture" (BBC Symphony Orchestra, Ogren)	3:31
2.	"Scene 1: 'Dans mon pays de Picardie'" (Guthrie, BBC Symphony Orchestra, Ogren)	5:04
3.	"Scene 2: 'Excusez-moi, Monsieur Philippe'" (Guthrie, Morrison, BBC Symphony Orchestra, Ogren)	4:09
4.	"Scene 3: 'Vocalise'"	2:53
5.	"Scene 4: 'Et maintenant, Aliénor, à nous deux'"	1:04
6.	"Aria 'Quand j'étais jeune étudiante'" (Kelly, BBC Symphony Orchestra, Ogren)	5:43
7.	"Scene 5: 'Dans ce jardin'" (Kelly, Figueroa, BBC Symphony Orchestra, Ogren)	9:54
8.	"Scene 6: Meditation" (BBC Symphony Orchestra, Ogren)	6:11
9.	"Scene 7: 'C'est impossible !'" (Kelly, Guthrie, Morrison, BBC Symphony Orchestra, Ogren)	4:02
10.	"Scene 8: 'Maintenant il est temps'" (Guthrie, Figueroa, Morrison, BBC Symphony Orchestra, Ogren)	3:30
11.	"Scene 9: 'Je suis heureuse'" (Kelly, Guthrie, Figueroa, BBC Symphony Orchestra, Ogren)	3:48
12.	"Scene 10: Aria 'Prenez-le donc'" (Kelly, BBC Symphony Orchestra, Ogren)	6:11
13.	"Scene 11: Final Interlude" (BBC Symphony Orchestra, Ogren)	5:13
14.	"Scene 12: Brief Percussion Fireworks Music – Aria 'Les feux d'artifice'" (Kelly, BBC Symphony Orchestra, Ogren)	6:56
Total length:		1:08:13

Track listing adapted from Deutsche Grammophon.

== Personnel ==
- BBC Symphony Orchestra
- Antonio Figueroa
- Kathryn Guthrie
- Janis Kelly
- Richard Morrison
- Jayce Ogren

Credits adapted from Deutsche Grammophon
