= Live from the Artists Den =

- Genre: Music
- Country of origin: United States
- Original language: English
- No. of seasons: 12

Production
- Production company: Artists Den Entertainment

Original release
- Release: 2008 – present

Live from the Artists Den is a three-time New York Emmy-nominated television series that features musical performances of popular musicians in historical or unconventional settings across North America. Live From the Artists Den broadcasts nationally on public television (now in its 14th season) and internationally in the United Kingdom, Latin America, China, Japan, Germany, New Zealand, and Canada.

Featured artists have included Adele, David Gray, Mumford & Sons, Tim McGraw, Ed Sheeran, Zac Brown Band, Imagine Dragons, Norah Jones, Soundgarden, Vampire Weekend, Kid Rock, Robert Plant, The Fray, Elvis Costello, The National, Ringo Starr, Marina and the Diamonds, Death Cab for Cutie, and Alabama Shakes. Featured venues have included Graceland, the first art museum in America; a Masonic temple, a former Archdiocese cathedral, a 1930s silent movie theater, the world's oldest merchant sailing vessel, the New York Public Library, and the Metropolitan Museum of Art. A full listing of previously featured artists, TV episodes, and venues can be viewed at artistsden.com.

Live CDs, DVDs, and digital downloads of Artists Den performances can be purchased online via iTunes and the Artists Den website.

On August 3, 2015, the Artists Den announced its first cinema release, Artists Den Presents alt-j, in partnership with Fathom Events. The one-night cinema event premiered in U.S. cinemas on September 2, 2015, and featured the U.K. rock band's full-length Artists Den performance at the Hollywood American Legion, plus exclusive interviews and an introduction from the band.

== Format ==
Each hour-long episode of Live from the Artists Den contains an intimate performance and interview with the featured artist(s). Mark Lieberman (Executive Producer) and Alan Light (Director of Programming) select artists with a reputation for impressive live performances, and locations are chosen for their historical significance, beauty, and/or sentimental value to the artist. The series differs from similar shows in that the venue is as much a distinguishing feature of the show as the performance. The audience for each intimate, invitation-only performance is selected via the official Artists Den mailing list.

"Live from the Artists Den" is a production of Artists Den Entertainment, presented by WLIW in association with WNET, and is distributed nationally by American Public Television. The series is filmed in 1080 high-definition and audio is recorded using Apogee’s custom Symphony I/O 64 channel multi-track system for extraordinary sound fidelity.

== Seasons ==
=== Season One ===
Season One premiered in February 2009.

- KT Tunstall at the Prince George Ballroom in Manhattan
- Jakob Dylan at the Desmond Tutu Cultural Center in New York's Chelsea neighborhood
- Alanis Morissette at Judson Memorial Church in New York's Greenwich Village
- Raphael Saadiq at the Harvard Club of Boston
- Ani DiFranco at the Pennsylvania Academy of the Fine Arts in Philadelphia
- Ben Harper in Manchester, Tennessee at the 2007 Bonnaroo Music & Arts Festival
- Aimee Mann at Vibiana Cathedral in downtown Los Angeles
- Crowded House at the Masonic Hall Grand Lodge of New York
- Ingrid Michaelson at Cape Cinema in Cape Cod
- Josh Ritter at the Natural History Museum of Los Angeles County
- The Hold Steady at the Old Emigrant Savings Bank Building in downtown New York
- Patty Griffin at the Angel Orensanz Foundation For the Arts on New York's Lower East Side
- The Swell Season (from the Fox Searchlight film Once) at the Good Shepherd Center Chapel in Seattle

=== Season Two ===
Season Two premiered July 5, 2010.

- Ringo Starr and Ben Harper at The Metropolitan Museum of Art
- Tori Amos at the Park Avenue Armory in New York's Upper East Side
- David Gray at the Broad Street Ballroom in New York's Wall Street
- The Black Crowes at the Lyric Oxford in Oxford, Mississippi
- Corinne Bailey Rae at the Hiro Ballroom in New York City
- Dierks Bentley at the Ravenswood Billboard Factory in Chicago
- Booker T. Jones, Drive-By Truckers and Bettye LaVette at the Patrick F. Taylor Library in New Orleans

=== Season Three ===
Season Three premiered April 1, 2011.

- Elvis Costello at the New York Public Library Main Branch
- Ray LaMontagne and the Pariah Dogs at the Don Strange Ranch in Boerne, TX
- Grace Potter and the Nocturnals at Bryant Park in New York City
- Robert Plant at the War Memorial Auditorium in Nashville, TN
- Squeeze at Bryant Park in New York City
- Compilation episode featuring Daniel Merriweather at Sotheby's in New York City, A Fine Frenzy at Guild Hall in the Hamptons, and Lisa Hannigan at the Unitarian Universalist Church in Montclair, NJ

=== Season Four ===
Season Four premiered February 3, 2012.

- Adele at the Santa Monica Bay Woman's Club in Santa Monica, California
- The Fray at the Angel Orensanz Foundation on New York's Lower East Side.
- Death Cab for Cutie at the Brooklyn Museum in Brooklyn, NY
- Kid Rock at Graceland in Memphis, TN
- Iron and Wine at the Buckhead Theatre in Atlanta, GA
- Amos Lee with special guests Calexico at the Fox Theatre in Tucson, AZ

=== Season Five ===
Season Five premiered October 5, 2012.

- Norah Jones at the Green Building in Carroll Gardens, Brooklyn
- The Wallflowers at the Bimbo's 365 Club in San Francisco, CA
- Rufus Wainwright at the Church of the Ascension on New York's Fifth Ave. (Recorded May 17, 2012)
- Mayer Hawthorne at the Park Plaza Hotel in Los Angeles, CA

=== Season Six ===
Season Six premiered in July 2013

- Mumford & Sons at the Belasco Theater in Los Angeles, CA
- Soundgarden at The Wiltern in Los Angeles, CA
- The Killers at Capitale (the former Bowery Savings Bank building) in New York, NY
- Ed Sheeran at the New York Society for Ethical Culture in New York, NY
- The National at the Park Avenue Armory in New York, NY
- Imagine Dragons at the Ebell of Los Angeles in Los Angeles, CA

=== Season Seven ===
Season Seven premiered in January 2014

- Phoenix at Anderson High School in Austin, TX
- Sheryl Crow at The Plaza Hotel in New York, NY
- Sara Bareilles at the Orpheum Theatre in Los Angeles, CA
- Vampire Weekend at the General Society of Mechanics & Tradesmen in New York, NY
- Fitz and the Tantrums at the Theatre at the Ace Hotel (formerly the United Artists Theatre) in Los Angeles, CA
- 5-Year Anniversary Special

=== Season Eight ===
Season Eight premiered in July 2014

- Tim McGraw at The Corinthian in Houston, TX
- Rodrigo y Gabriela at the Hispanic Society of America in Washington Heights, Manhattan
- Lily Allen at the Manhattan Center Grand Ballroom in New York, NY
- Jason Mraz at Royce Hall at UCLA in Los Angeles, CA

=== Season Nine ===
Season Nine premiered in January 2015

- Zac Brown Band at Forest Hills Stadium in Queens, NY
- Alabama Shakes at the Loveless Barn at the Loveless Cafe in Nashville, TN
- Cage the Elephant at the Santa Barbara Art Foundry in Santa Barbara, CA
- Damien Rice at the Greenpoint Loft in Brooklyn, NY

=== Season Ten ===
Season Ten premiered in April 2016

- Hozier at the Theatre at the Ace Hotel (formerly the United Artists Theatre) in Los Angeles, CA
- alt-J at the Hollywood American Legion Post 43 in Los Angeles, CA
- Marina and the Diamonds at the New York Hall of Science at Flushing Meadows-Corona Park in Queens, NY
- Gary Clark Jr. at Antone's Nightclub in Austin, TX

=== Season Eleven ===
Season Eleven premiered in October 2016

- Panic! At the Disco at The Mayan Theater in Los Angeles, CA
- Young the Giant at the El Rey in Los Angeles, CA
- Sturgill Simpson at the Broad Street Ballroom in New York, NY
- The Lumineers at the Kings Theatre in Brooklyn, NY

=== Season Twelve ===
Season Twelve premiered in September 2017

- John Legend at the Riverside Church in Harlem, NY
- OneRepublic at Park City Live in Park City, UT
- Lady Antebellum at the United Palace in Washington Heights, NY
- Fleet Foxes at The Knockdown Center in Queens, NY

=== Season Thirteen ===
Season Thirteen premiered in September 2019

- Shawn Mendes at the 99 Scott in Brooklyn, NY
- Charli XCX at Pier 17 in New York, NY
- James Bay at Webster Hall in New York, NY
- Vance Joy at Sunset Center in Carmel-by-the-Sea, CA

=== Season Fourteen ===
Season Fourteen is scheduled to premiere in June 2026

- Lord Huron at the San Gabriel Mission Playhouse in San Gabriel, CA

== See also ==
- Rufus Wainwright: Live from the Artists Den
