= The First Men in the Moon (disambiguation) =

The First Men in the Moon is a novel by H. G. Wells.

The First Men in the Moon may also refer to:

- A Trip to the Moon, a silent adaptation of the novel and Jules Verne's From the Earth to the Moon
- The First Men in the Moon (1919 film), silent adaptation of the novel
- First Men in the Moon (1964 film), film adaptation of the novel
- The First Men in the Moon (2010 film), television adaptation of the novel

== See also ==
- Apollo 11, the NASA mission that sent the first men to the surface of the Moon
- Apollo 8, the NASA mission that sent the first men around the Moon
- Project Apollo, the NASA program that sent the first astronauts to the Moon
- Moon Race, the Cold War competition between the U.S.A. and U.S.S.R. to reach the Moon
