= Cigarettes and Chocolate Milk =

Song by Rufus Wainwright

from the album Poses
- Released: June 5, 2001
- Genre: Pop
- Length: 4:44
- Label: DreamWorks
- Songwriter: Rufus Wainwright
- Producer: Pierre Marchand

"Cigarettes and Chocolate Milk" is a song written and performed by the Canadian–American singer-songwriter Rufus Wainwright. It appears as the opening track on his second studio album, Poses (2001). The song addresses decadence and desire, and has been called an "ode to subtle addictions and the way our compulsions rule our lives".

A reprise version of the song appears as the last track on the album.

== Music video ==
The music video for the track, directed by Giles Dunning and released by DreamWorks in 2001, features Wainwright performing the song at a piano inside a warehouse, and scenes of him walking around New York City. The audio track of the video is the reprise version, with the added percussion backing.

== Reception ==
In his review for Allmusic, Matthew Greenwald wrote that the song "combines classic Gershwin/Brian Wilson pop feels along with a strong sense of French cabaret show tunes", and called the shifts in modulation coupled with dissonant chords "intoxicating".

== Personnel ==
- Rufus Wainwright – vocals, piano, string arrangements
- Jeff Hill – bass
- Jim Keltner – drums
- Yves Desrosiers – banjo, guitar
- Pierre Marchand – string arrangements
- Stephanie Allard – violin
- Jean-Marc LeBlanc – violin
- Melanie Belair – violin
- Genevieve Beaudry – violin
- Julie Dupras – viola
- Wilma Hos – viola
- Veronique Potuin – viola
- Greg Hay – viola
- Carla Antoun – cello
- Christine Giguere – cello
- Jean Paquin – French horn
- Pierre Savoie – French horn
- Normand Forget – oboe

== Charts ==
Chart (2026)	Peak position
Israel International Airplay (Media Forest)	19

== Appearances ==
Apart from being the opening and closing track on Poses, a live performance of "Cigarettes and Chocolate Milk" from Central Park SummerStage appeared on Wainwright's 2005 music DVD, All I Want. Wainwright also performs the song on the 2001 DVD Circuit 9. "Cigarettes and Chocolate Milk" appears on the soundtrack to the Italian film Caos Calmo, as well as the following compilation albums: Live at the World Café: Handcrafted (2002), 107.1 KGSR Radio Austin – Broadcasts Vol.10 (2002), Oh What a Feeling 3 (2006), and Northern Songs: Canada's Best and Brightest (2008). The reprise version appears on the soundtrack to the film The Last Kiss (2006). It also appeared in the How I Met Your Mother season 5 episode "Last Cigarette Ever".

=== Covers ===
On Yellow Lounge: Compiled by Rufus Wainwright, a 2007 compilation album of Wainwright's favorite classical pieces, the Fauré Quartet performs instrumental versions of Wainwright's songs "Cigarettes and Chocolate Milk" and "Hometown Waltz".
