= One Man Guy (song) =

"One Man Guy" is a song written by American singer-songwriter Loudon Wainwright III. It originally appeared on his 1985 studio album I'm Alright, and was included on his 2009 compilation album Essential Recordings: One Man Guy.

== Cover versions ==
His son, Rufus Wainwright recorded a cover version of "One Man Guy" for his 2001 album Poses. The track features vocals by Teddy Thompson (whose father Richard Thompson produced the original recording by the senior Wainwright) and Wainwright's sister, Martha Wainwright. Pitchfork's Joe Tangari described Wainwright's cover as "faithful and endearing" and said his performance "proves [he] has at least a touch of dad's folk roots in him." The song also appears on Wainwright's 2014 album Rufus Wainwright: Live from the Artists Den.
