= L.C.P. di Pompei =

Pompei 2000, often known as Ditta Pompei simply as Pompei, is an Italian manufacturer of shoes for film and stage productions. Founded in 1932 by cousins Ernesto and Luigi Pompei, it has primarily served Cinecittà film productions. In the 1960s, it manufactured classical foot gear for the numerous sword and sandal epics being made at Cinecittà. Since the 1970s when the company was passed down to Ernesto's son, Carlo Pompei. Their stock consists of approximately 800,000 thousand shoes.

Based in Rome, Pompei also has branches in Paris and London.

== List of notable projects ==
- The Iron Crown (1941)
- The Mysterious Cavalier (1948)
- Messalina (1951)
- Quo Vadis? (1951)
- Mademoiselle Gobete (1952)
- Puccini (1953)
- Romeo and Juliet (1954)
- Theodora, Slave Empress (1954)
- Beatrice Cenci (1956)
- Le fatiche di Ercole (1958)
- The Sword and the Cross (1958)
- Legions of the Nile (1959)
- Goliath and the Dragon (1960)
- La Dolce Vita (1960)
- Queen of the Pirates (1960)
- The Giants of Thessaly (1960)
- Atlas in the Land of the Cyclops (1961)
- Cleopatra (1963)
- Buffalo Bill, Hero of the Far West (1964)
- Spartacus and the Ten Gladiators (1964)
- Planet of the Vampires (1965)
- One Thousand Dollars on the Black (1966)
- Day of Anger (1967)
- Once Upon a Time in the West (1968)
- Romeo and Juliet (1968)
- Waterloo (1970)
- Duck, You Sucker! (1971)
- Treasure Island (1972)
- Ludwig (1973)
- Amarcord (1973)
- Salò o le 120 giornate di Sodoma (1975)
- Salon Kitty (1976)
- Caligula (1979)
- The Sheriff and the Satellite Kid (1979)
- Monty Python's Life of Brian (1979)
- Amadeus (1984)
- Jean de Florette (1986)
- Manon of the Spring (1986)
- The Name of the Rose (1986)
- Casanova (1987)
- The Last Emperor (1987)
- The Age of Innocence (1993)
- La Reine Margot (1994)
- Prince of Jutland (1994)
- Catherine the Great (1995)
- Beaumarchais l'insolent (1996)
- The English Patient (1996)
- Evita (1996)
- The Portrait of a Lady (1996)
- Life Is Beautiful (1997)
- The Wings of the Dove (1997)
- Shakespeare in Love (1998)
- The Talented Mr. Ripley (1999)
- The King is Dancing (2000)
- Shadow of the Vampire (2000)
- Triumph of Love (2001)
- Bon Voyage (2003)
- The Passion of the Christ (2004)
- Casanova (2005)
- Oliver Twist (2005)
- The Tiger and the Snow (2005)
- Goya's Ghosts (2006)
- Marie Antoinette (2006)
- Elizabeth: The Golden Age (2007)
- Brideshead Revisited (2008)
- Bright Star (2009)
- The Young Victoria (2009)
- Paris, je t'aime (2013)
- The Great Beauty (2014)
- The Grand Budapest Hotel (2014)
- The Danish Girl (2015)
- Star Wars: Episode VII – The Force Awakens (2015)
- Suffragette (2015)
- Tale of Tales (2015)
- Café Society (2016)
- Florence Foster Jenkins (2016)
- Fantastic Beasts and Where to Find Them (2016)
- Sophie's Misfortunes (2016)
- Tulip Fever (2017)
