= First Person Singular =

First Person Singular may refer to:

== Literature ==
- First Person Singular (short story collection), a 2020 short story collection by Haruki Murakami
- First Person Singular (play), a play by Lewis Grant Wallace
- "First Person Singular", a short story by Eric Frank Russell published in Deep Space (1954)

== Film and television ==
- First Person Singular: Pearson – The Memoirs of a Prime Minister, a 1973–1975 Canadian television miniseries
- First Person Singular, the original title of The Mercury Theatre on the Air radio series
- First Person Singular, a 1969–1975 BBC Scotland interview series presented by Mary Marquis
- First Person Singular: I. M. Pei, a 1997 PBS documentary about I. M. Pei

== See also ==
- First person singular, referring to the grammatical person
