= Costumi d'Arte =

Italian costume house

Costumi d'Arte is an Italian costume atelier and supplier for theater, motion picture and television productions.

== History ==
The first iteration of Costumi d'Arte was founded in Rome in 1815 by former soldier Angelo Pignotti. The companie's original holdings of the company constituted several authentic 17th and 18th century garments. The company name Casa d'Arte was coined by Egisto Peruzzi, Pignotti's son-in-law, who took over the business and relocated it to Florence. Under Egisto's management, the company began creating its costumes and renting antique items.

By the 1920s, the company's costumes were being used extensively in film productions, as well as in regional productions. Giuseppe Peruzzi, the grandson of Egisto, opened a branch of Costumi d'Arte Perruzi in Rome to work more cohesively with studios like Cinecittà. Ownership was assumed by Giuseppe's son, Ruggero Peruzzi, when he died in 1955. By the mid-1960s, Costumi d'Arte was reaching an unprecedented international audience through films like, The 300 Spartans, Prince of Foxes, The Golden Coach, A Farewell to Arms, Spartacus and The Cardinal.

In 2019, costume designer Maja Meschede described Costumi d'Arte as being, along with Peruzzi and Tirelli, one of the best costume houses for 18th-century stock.

== Partial Company filmography ==
- Black Magic (1949)
- The Golden Coach (1952)
- A Farewell to Arms (1957)
- Spartacus (1960)
- The Cardinal (1963)
- The Leopard (1963)
- The Shoes of the Fisherman (1963)
- The Duellists (1977)
- The Tree of Wooden Clogs (1978)
- Il Marchese del Grillo (1981)
- Gorky Park (1983)
- Dune (1984)
- Warriors of the Year 2072 (1984)
- The Key to Rebecca (1985)
- A Room with a View (1985)
- Opera (1987)
- Willow (1988)
- Torrents of Spring (1989)
- The Sun Also Shines at Night (1990)
- Bix (1991)
- The House of the Spirits (1993)
- Interview with the Vampire (1994)
- Widows' Peak (1994)
- First Knight (1995)
- Jefferson in Paris (1995)
- The Quick and the Dead (1995)
- Hamlet (1996)
- In Love and War (1996)
- Mary Reilly (1996)
- The Portrait of a Lady (1996)
- Anna Karenina (1997)
- Life Is Beautiful (1997)
- Seven Years in Tibet (1997)
- Ever After (1998)
- Les Misérables (1998)
- Shakespeare in Love (1998)
- Tea with Mussolini (1999)
- The Patriot (2000)
- Brotherhood of the Wolf (2001)
- Captain Corelli's Mandolin (2001)
- Triumph of Love (2001)
- Amen. (2002)
- Gangs of New York (2002)
- Senso '45 (2002)
- Ferrari (2003)
- Seabiscuit (2003)
- King Arthur (2004)
- The Merchant of Venice (2004)
- Stage Beauty (2004)
- Casanova (2005)
- Marie Antoinette (2006)
- Elizabeth: The Golden Age (2007)
- Brideshead Revisited (2008)
- Il Divo (2008)
- The Duchess (2008)
- The Big Heart of Girls (2011)
- Sherlock Holmes: A Game of Shadows (2011)
- Abraham Lincoln: Vampire Hunter (2012)
- Anna Karenina (2012)
- Snow White and the Huntsman (2012)
- Into the Woods (2014)
- Cinderella (2015)
