= Tirelli Costumi =

Costume house based in Rome, Italy

Logo

Tirelli Costumi Roma is a Rome-based costume house, which makes and supplies period costumes to motion picture productions. It has been sited, along with Costumi d'Arte and Peruzzi, as one of the best resources for 18th-century costumes.

== History ==
The company was founded by Umberto Tirelli in 1964, following Tirelli's apprenticeship as a costume maker on The Leopard.

In addition to their film work, Tirelli Costumi has supplied and created costumes for stage productions. Their first was a production of Tosca at Teatro dell'Opera, a production directed by Mauro Bolognini with costumes by Anna Anni. Tirelli Costumi has worked with Teatro del Maggio Musicale Fiorentino, Teatro Comunale di Bologna, Sferisterio di Macerata, La Fenice in Venice, La Scala in Milan, Teatro Regio in Parma, Teatro di San Carlo in Naples, Teatro Municipale Giuseppe Verdi in Salerno, Teatro Massimo Bellini in Catania, Teatro Petruzzelli in Bari, Teatro de la Maestranza in Seville, Teatro Massimo in Palermo, Teatro Comunale in Ferrara, Teatro delle Muse in Ancona, Teatro Flavio Vespasiano in Rieti, Teatro di Palma in Palma de Mallorca, Teatro Pérez Galdós on Gran Canaria, Théâtre du Capitole in Toulouse, the Liceu in Barcelona, Teatro Colón in Buenos Aires, Teatro Municipal in Santiago, the New National Theatre in Tokyo, the Israeli Opera House in Tel Aviv and Royal Opera House in Muscat, Oman. Productions at the Festival Internacional de Santander, Maggio Musicale Fiorentino, the Ravenna Festival and Olbe A.B.A.O. Bilbao have utilized Tirelli garments.

As of 2019, Tirelli's fitting and administrative offices are located in the former residence of Marcello Mastroianni, while the company's warehouses are nearby, just outside Rome's city limits.

== Selected filmography ==
- The Grand Budapest Hotel (2014)
- Winter's Tale (2014)
- The Zero Theorem (2013)
- Grace of Monaco (2013)
- Abraham Lincoln: Vampire Hunter (2012)
- Anna Karenina (2012)
- Cloud Atlas (2012)
- John Carter (2012)
- Les Misérables (2012)
- Maleficent (2012)
- Dark Shadows (2011)
- Season of the Witch (2011)
- Snow White and the Huntsman (2011)
- The Three Musketeers (2011)
- Barney's Version (2010)
- Letters to Juliet (2010)
- Miracle at St. Anna (2008)
- Goya's Ghosts (2006)
- Marie Antoinette (2006)
- Casanova (2005)
- The Brothers Grimm (2005)
- Stage Beauty (2004)
- Tea with Mussolini (1999)
- Cousin Bette (1998)
- Dangerous Beauty (1998)
- The Talented Mr. Ripley (1998)
- Evita (1996)
- The English Patient (1996)
- Braveheart (1995)
- The Adventures of Baron Munchausen (1988)
- Casanova (1987)
- Fellini's Casanova (1976)
- Salon Kitty (1976)
- The Night Porter (1974)
- Amarcord (1973)
- Roma (1972)
- Duck, You Sucker! (1971)
- Two English Girls (1971)
- The Conformist (1970)
- La strega in amore (1966)
- El Greco (1966)
- Hotel Paradiso (1966)
- Il Compagno Don Camillo (1964)

== Selected Television filmography ==
- Game of Thrones (2011-2015)
- Da Vinci's Demons (2013-2015)
- Dancing on the Edge (2013)
- The Borgias (2011-2013)
- Copper (2012-2013)
- Camelot (2011)
- The Tudors (2007-2010)
- John Adams (2008)
- Empire (2005)
- Rasputin: Dark Servant of Destiny (1996)
- Scarlett (1994)
- Anastasia: The Mystery of Anna (1986)
