= First-person shooter (disambiguation) =

First-person shooter is a video game genre, sometimes also known as Doom clone.

- Boomer shooter

First-person shooter may also refer to:

- "First Person Shooter" (The X-Files), an episode of The X-Files
- "First Person Shooter", a song by Celldweller from Soundtrack for the Voices in My Head Vol. 02
- "First Person Shooter" (song), a song by Drake from For All the Dogs
- Other shooter games that use a first-person perspective:
  - Light-gun shooter
  - Rail shooter
  - Shooting gallery game

== See also ==
- First-person shooter engine, a type of video game engine
- Massively multiplayer online first-person shooter
