= First Person (radio program) =

First Person was a radio program that was broadcast on Radio National by the Australian Broadcasting Corporation from 2002 to 2012. It was "serialised reading of a published autobiography" according to the program's archived website. Its first episode on 30 December 2002 was a reading from Australian philosopher Raimond Gaita's memoir Romulus, My Father. Its last episode on 20 January 2012 was a reading from Australian writer and journalist Michael McGirr's 2009 book Snooze: The Lost Art of Sleep.
