= Janis Kelly (soprano) =

Scottish operatic soprano

Janis Kelly (born 30 December 1954) is a Scottish operatic soprano and voice teacher. Her career has covered a wide range of opera from baroque to contemporary work and she has made some audio and video recordings of key roles. She is Professor and Chair of Vocal Performance at the Royal College of Music in London.

== Early life ==
Kelly was born in Glasgow, Scotland, second of eight children in a large family in Inverness where singing was part of growing up, songs from the musicals and making up their own show, sowing the seed for working in the theatre.

She studied at the Royal Scottish Academy of Music & Drama, where she sang Susanna, a role in The Tender Land and Belinda in Dido and Aeneas, and the Royal College of Music where she sang Pamina. She studied under Elisabeth Grümmer in Paris and Frankfurt from 1980 to 1983 and continued with other teachers in London. On leaving college she started her career with Yum-Yum for the Music Theatre Company in 1979 at the Westminster Theatre, London, followed by her English National Opera debut in 1980 as Amor and Damigella in The Coronation of Poppea.

== Career and reception ==
=== Operatic appearances ===
Kelly worked with Opera Factory, run by David Freeman, based in Zurich at the time. With the group she sang Despina, Juno, the Countess in The Marriage of Figaro and in Hell's Angels by Osborne.

Kelly has performed with the English National Opera for over 30 years. Her roles at the ENO have included Marcellina in Mozart's The Marriage of Figaro, Mrs Grose in Britten's The Turn of the Screw, Venus in Orpheus in the Underworld, Beketaten in the UK premiere of Philip Glass's Ahknaten and the Dew Fairy and Gretel in Hansel and Gretel. In 2009 she starred as Régine Saint Laurent in the premiere of Prima Donna, written by Rufus Wainwright. Reviewing the performance in The Telegraph, Rupert Christiansen described Kelly as an 'amazing chameleon'. Having appeared as Pat Nixon in the first UK staging of John Adams' Nixon in China in June 2000 at ENO, she reprised the role at the Metropolitan Opera in New York City in 2011. The New York Times described her performance as "wonderful".

Once settled in her career, "a casting director of one of the leading British companies", asked by her agent why she was not offered roles replied that she was "too versatile"; in a 2001 interview she stated that she "liked to sing lots of styles and I've gained from every style I've performed in". Rose Maurrant in Street Scene was a landmark role; firstly a charity show at the Cambridge Theatre conducted by John Owen Edwards with Alec McCowen, Elaine Page and Paul Harrhy as Sam Kaplan, then in the Pountney Scottish Opera production when it transferred to the London Coliseum. In 1994 she underwent a transformation of her voice from light soprano to heavier lyric roles such as The Marschallin to motherhood; in 1994 she gave birth to triplets, her voice changed dramatically "The voice felt more mature, darker, and I found it had more depth and more height. I think your ribs expand naturally when you're pregnant and I just found more space" to sing in.

As well as Hell's Angels and Prima Donna, she appeared in the premieres of Anna Karenina (Kitty) in 1981 and The Mask of Orpheus (First woman and Fury) in 1986. At the BBC Proms she sang Weill and Grosz in 1993, then in 1996 sang Iris in a concert performance of Semele by Les Arts Florissants, and in 2017 appeared as Berta in Glyndebourne Festival Opera's production of The Barber of Seville, also filmed in the theatre and issued on blu-ray and DVD. Returning to Semele in 1999 "the excellent Janis Kelly is a scene-stealing Iris" according to Edward Seckerson reviewing the ENO production in The Independent, prior to its live broadcast on BBC2 on 15 May 1999.

=== Film, television and records ===
Kelly's recording of Verdi's La traviata was featured in the 2005 Woody Allen film Match Point. Recordings by Kelly including a performance of the aria Senza Mamma from Puccini's Suor Angelica heard on the British ITV television series Inspector Morse; she is credited on three of the related CDs. She also sang the two songs for Ophelia in the incidental music to Tchaikovsky's Hamlet recorded for Chandos Records in 1981, with Geoffrey Simon conducting the London Symphony Orchestra. She participated in the complete Fauré song edition on Signum Records (Vols 1-3, 2016-18). She sang Anne Egerman on the 1990 recording of A Little Night Music, conducted by John Owen Edwards, and issued on Jay records.

She appeared as Constance in The Sorcerer and Mabel in The Pirates of Penzance in the Brent Walker Videos series of 1982-83, and, in addition to the Barber of Seville mentioned above, Hazel George in the Teatro Real Madrid premiere production of The Perfect American by Glass, (also filmed). Kelly was credited as Vocal Coach for the 2025 film The Choral. On radio she played Jane Harding in the BBC adaptation of Agatha Christie's Giant's Bread.
