= The Second Woman =

The Second Woman may refer to:

- The Second Woman (1950 film), a film by James V. Kern starring Robert Young and Betsy Drake
- The Second Woman (1953 film), a film by José Díaz Morales starring Rosa Carmina and Antonio Aguilar
- The Second Woman (2012 film), a film by Carol Lai starring Shu Qi and Shawn Yue
- The Second Woman (play), a 2016 play by Nat Randall and Anna Breckon
