= Francesco Vezzoli =

Italian artist and filmmaker

Francesco Vezzoli (born 1971) is an Italian artist and filmmaker.

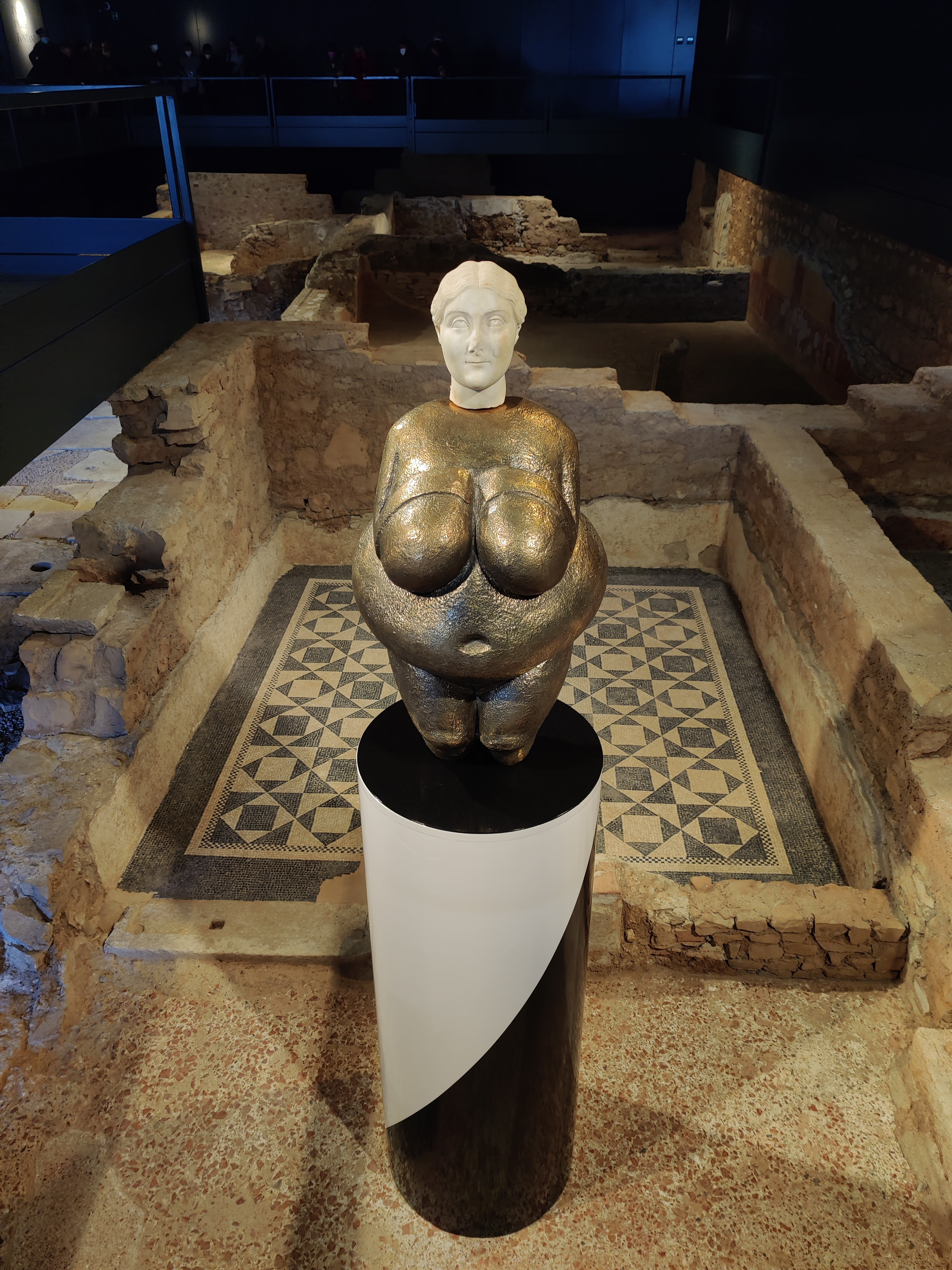
A sculpture at Museo di Santa Giulia, Brescia, Italy

== Work ==
Vezzoli studied at the Central Saint Martins School of Art in London from 1992 to 1995. In his early works from 1994 to 1996, he reenvisioned twentieth-century masterpieces by Mark Rothko and Josef Albers as modest-sized hand stitched petit point embroideries. Upon his return to Italy, Vezzoli created his first series of films entitled An Embroidered Trilogy (1997–99).

2000 Vezzoli shot the short film The Kiss (Let's play Dynasty) with Helmut Berger. In 2002 his films were the subject of a one-man exhibition at the New Museum in New York City curated by Dan Cameron. The film Non-Love Meetings (2004) from the series Trilogy of Death (2004) presents a game show in which contestants display their talents in hopes of winning the love of such celebrities as actress Catherine Deneuve. His Trailer for the Remake of Gore Vidal's Caligula (2005), featuring Courtney Love as the title character, along with Helen Mirren, Benicio del Toro, Milla Jovovich and Vidal himself, was his entry at the 2005 Venice Biennale, when he and Giuseppe Penone represented Italy. The film was also screened as part of the 2006 Whitney Biennial.

In 2007 Vezzoli was again included in the Venice Biennale in the Italian pavilion with his video piece DEMOCRAZY starring Sharon Stone and the French philosopher Bernard-Henri Levy as a pair of U.S. presidential candidates. That same year, he staged Luigi Pirandello's Right You Are (If You Think You Are) at the Solomon R. Guggenheim Museum, starring Abigail Breslin, Cate Blanchett and Dianne Wiest. On 14 November 2009 Vezzoli organised a performance where Lady Gaga performed her song Speechless on a pink Steinway & Sons piano decorated with painted-on butterflies while ballet dancers from the Bolshoi Theatre, danced alongside.

== Influences ==
In his work, Vezzoli is often compared to Jeff Koons, Ashley Bickerton, Cindy Sherman and Haim Steinbach.

== Controversy ==
On 25 November 2013 "The Church of Vezzoli" at MoMA PS1 in New York, one section of his three part retrospective "The Trinity", was cancelled after the church he arranged to buy in the town of Montegiordano for deployment in the exhibition is remanded in Italy prior to its leaving the country for the United States.

== Exhibitions ==
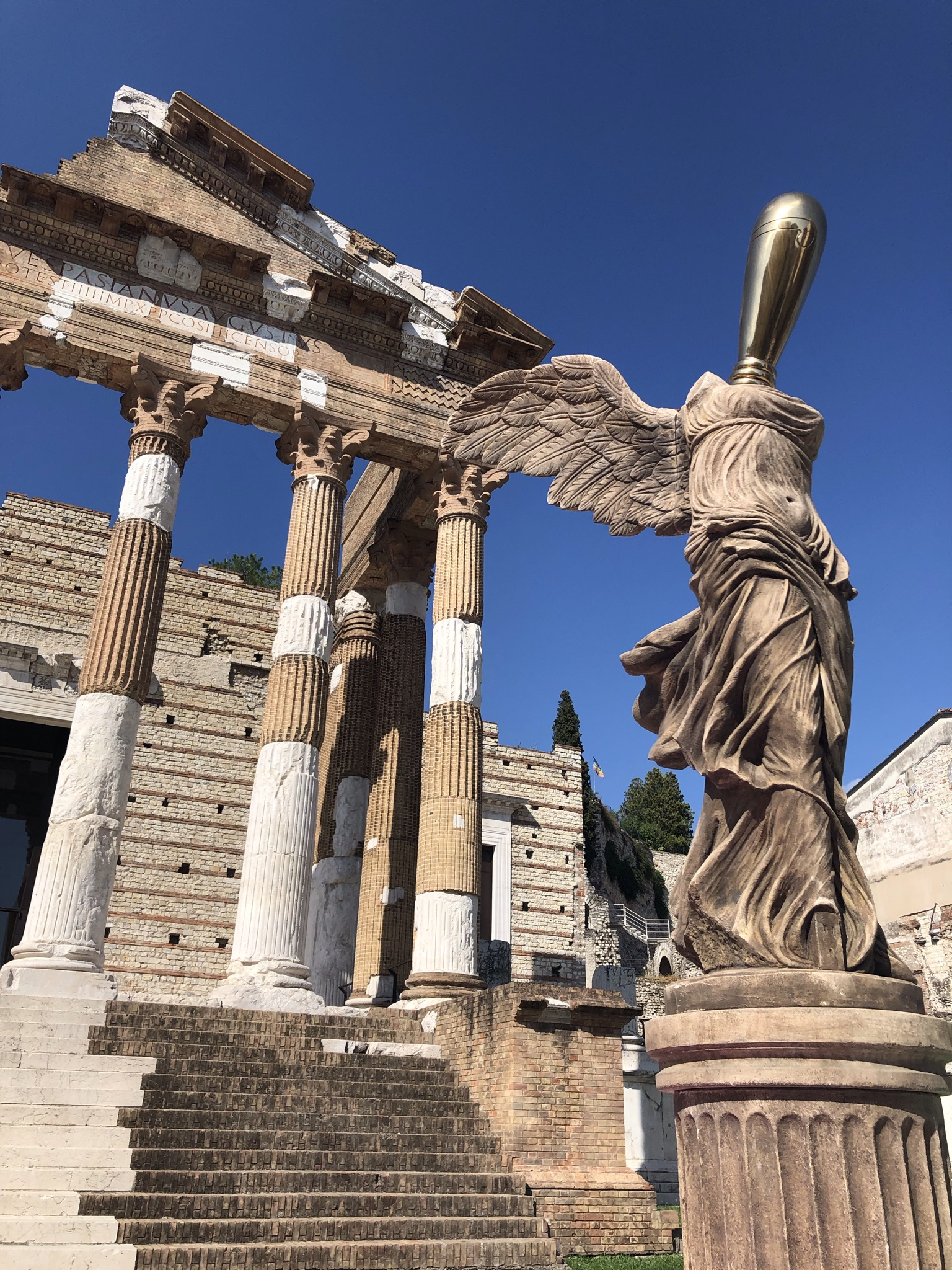

Vezzoli's work has been exhibited at many institutions including Castello di Rivoli Museo d'Arte Contemporanea, Turin (2002); Fondazione Prada, Milan (2004 and 2005); Museu Serralves, Porto (2005); Le Consortium, Dijon (2006); Tate Modern, London (2006); Moderna Museet, Stockholm (2009–2010); Kunsthalle Wien (2009); the Garage Center for Contemporary Culture, Moscow (2010); and the MAXXI – National Museum of the 21st Century Arts, Rome (2013). His work has also been included in major group exhibitions like the Istanbul Bienali (1999), Liverpool Biennial (2002), São Paulo Bienal (2004), Whitney Biennial (2006), Performa 07 and Performa 15. The Almine Rech gallery devoted two exhibitions to the artist : Francesco Vezzoli in Paris (2018) and Francesco Vezzoli's Eternal Kiss in London (2015)

== Filmography ==
- Democrazy (2007)
- Amália Traïda (2004)
