= First Lady (disambiguation) =

First Lady is the unofficial title used in some countries for the spouse of an elected head of state; it is also used in non-political contexts for prominent women in particular fields.

First Lady or The First Lady may also refer to:

== Theatre, film and TV ==
- First Lady (play), a 1935 play by George S. Kaufman and Katharine Dayton
  - First Lady (film), a 1937 adaptation of the play
- First Lady (Philippine TV series), a 2022 romantic comedy series
- First Lady (South Korean TV series), a 2025 melodrama political thriller series
- The First Lady (film), a 2015 Nigerian film
- The First Lady (British TV series), a 1968–1969 drama series
- The First Lady (Colombian TV series), a 2011–2012 telenovela
- The First Lady (American TV series), a 2022 anthology series
- Pandora: Beneath the Paradise, a 2023 revenge thriller series under the working title First Lady

== Music ==
- First Lady (album), by Lisa Maffia, 2003
- The First Lady (Tammy Wynette album), 1970
- The First Lady (Faith Evans album), 2005
- "The First Lady", a song by Irving Berlin

== Yachts ==
- Blackmores First Lady, sailed by Kay Cottee on her solo circumnavigation

== See also ==
- First woman (disambiguation)
- Ladies First (disambiguation)
- Prima Donna (disambiguation)
- Primera dama (disambiguation)
- Second Lady
