= Prima Donna (opera) =

2009 opera by Rufus Wainwright

- Opera by Rufus Wainwright
- Librettist: Bernadette Colomine; Rufus Wainwright
- Language: French
- Premiere: July 2009; Manchester International Festival, United Kingdom

Prima Donna is an opera in two acts with music by Rufus Wainwright to a French language libretto by Wainwright and Bernadette Colomine. The opera premiered at the Palace Theatre, Manchester, on 10 July 2009 at the Manchester International Festival.

== Development ==
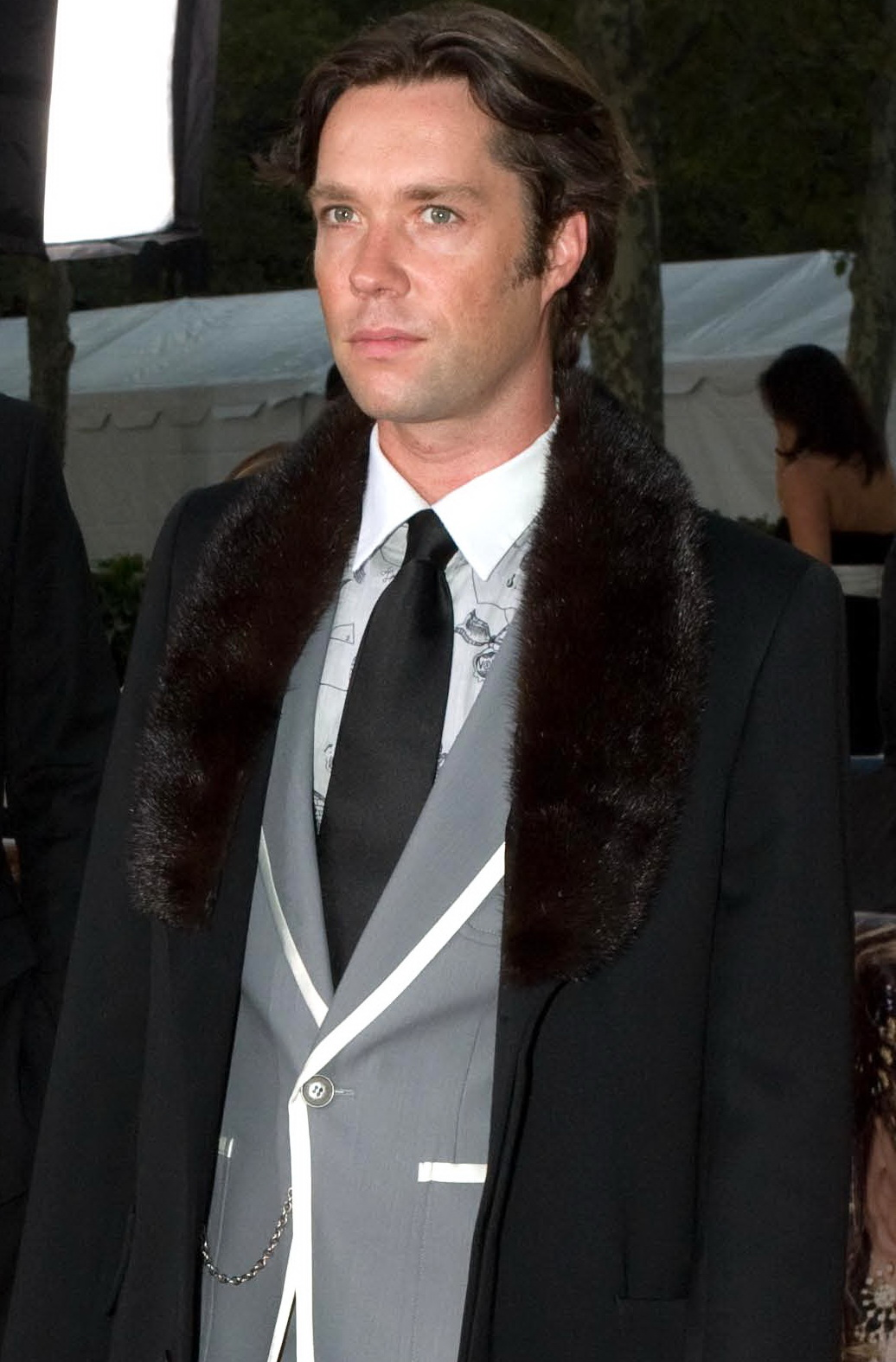
Wainwright at the Metropolitan Opera opening in 2008

Originally, Metropolitan Opera general manager Peter Gelb and André Bishop, artistic director of Lincoln Center Theater (LCT), commissioned this opera for eventual presentation in New York City. By August 2008, although Wainwright had made progress on the composition, the Metropolitan Opera withdrew its support of the commission, reportedly because of disagreement with Wainwright over his choice to present the opera in French, whilst the Metropolitan Opera and LCT insisted on English for the language of the libretto. According to Gelb, "presenting a new opera that is not in English at the Met, when it could be in English, is an immediate impediment". While Wainwright was initially open to the idea of translating the text into English, he said the French became "too entrenched in the music". In addition, the Met would not be able to premiere Prima Donna earlier than the 2014 season, and Wainwright insisted he "wanted to get it out as soon as possible". In October 2008, Opera North, the Manchester International Festival, Melbourne Festival Australia and Luminato Festival Toronto announced their plans for joint presentation of the opera, with conductor Pierre-André Valade, director Daniel Kramer, designer Antony McDonald, and Janis Kelly performing the lead role alongside Rebecca Bottone, William Joyner and Jonathan Summers. With a workshop scheduled for January 2009, Wainwright revealed in a Brazilian TV show interview that his opera was to premiere in Manchester, United Kingdom in July 2009.

In December 2009, Sundance Channel aired a 90-minute documentary, directed by George Scott, titled Prima Donna spotlighting the history of Wainwright's career and his attempt to "create classical opera from scratch".

=== Further performances ===
Following the Manchester premiere, London performances at Sadler's Wells Theatre were held in April 2010. The North American premiere took place June 2010 at the Luminato festival in Toronto, with Wainwright present. Excerpts from Prima Donna were first performed in the US on September 3, 2010 by the Oregon Symphony under Carlos Kalmar with Kelly as Régine and Megan Marie Hart as Marie at the opening event of the Time-Based Art Festival in Portland. Prima Donna had its New York City debut on February 19, 2012, with the New York City Opera at the Brooklyn Academy of Music.

In March 2014, Wainwright began raising funds to record a two-disc album recording of the opera. Deutsche Grammophon released this album in 2015.

In 2015, Wainwright launched a new version of a scene from the opera, accompanied by a film directed by Francesco Vezzoli, featuring Cindy Sherman as the Prima Donna. This version was presented at the 2017 Adelaide Festival with Jacqueline Dark in the title role.

For a Royal Swedish Opera production of the opera in October and November 2020, during the COVID-19 pandemic, conductor Jayce John Ogren and Wainwright prepared a version of the opera with a reduced orchestra, of 28 musicians; this version premiered on October 10, 2020, in Stockholm.

== Roles ==
Roles, voice types, premiere casts
Role	Voice type	Premiere cast, 10 July 2009 Conductor: Pierre-André Valade
Régine Saint Laurent, an operatic soprano	soprano	Janis Kelly
Marie, her maid	soprano	Rebecca Bottone
Philippe, her butler	baritone	Jonathan Summers
André Le Tourner, a journalist	tenor	William Joyner

== Synopsis ==
Place: The Paris apartment of opera soprano Régine Saint Laurent
Time: Bastille Day, 1970

The opera soprano Régine Saint Laurent has been preparing for a return to performance after an absence of 6 years. Her last performance was in an opera composed for her, Aliénor d'Aquitaine. The first performance was a success, and a recording of the premiere was released commercially. However, she lost her voice during a key aria at a subsequent performance, and has not sung professionally in public since. Philippe, her butler, has encouraged her comeback, which includes an interview scheduled for that day.

A journalist and aspiring singer, André Le Tourner, arrives to conduct the interview. Marie, the new maid, is suspicious of André, but Philippe dismisses Marie's concerns. Régine notices a great resemblance between André and the tenor who sang during the premiere production of Aliénor d'Aquitaine. André has brought the score of Aliénor d'Aquitaine with him. Régine and André develop a mutual infatuation, and sing selections from the opera at the piano. Régine begins to relive both the premiere of Aliénor d'Aquitaine and the moment of her later performance breakdown. In the process, she comes to a resolution on her intended comeback.
