= Ancient humans =

The following articles contain information related to ancient humans:

- Human evolution
- Archaic humans
- Early modern humans
- Prehistoric people
- Ancient history

== See also ==
- Category:Ancient peoples
- Category:Lists of ancient people
