= Poses (album) =

Studio album by Rufus Wainwright
- Released: June 5, 2001
- Recorded: 2000
- Genres: Baroque pop; chamber pop
- Length: 53:19
- Label: DreamWorks
- Producers: Pierre Marchand; Greg Wells; Alex Gifford; Ethan Johns; Damian LeGassick

Rufus Wainwright chronology
Rufus Wainwright (1998)	Poses (2001)	Want One (2003)

Poses is the second studio album by the American-Canadian singer-songwriter Rufus Wainwright, released through DreamWorks Records in June 2001. The album was recorded, mixed, and produced by Pierre Marchand, with select tracks produced by Propellerheads' Alex Gifford ("Shadows"), Ethan Johns ("California"), Damian LeGassick ("The Tower of Learning"), and Greg Wells ("Across the Universe").

Poses contains ornate, piano-driven arrangements that cite a wide variety of musical sources, from "indie pop to Gershwin to trip-hop and back again." The album took a year and a half to record, with most of it written during Wainwright's six-month stay at the Chelsea Hotel. While Poses continues the enveloping sound established by Wainwright's debut album, collaborations between Wainwright and various producers and guest musicians pushed it in different directions, resulting in drum loops, "gritty beats in unexpected places", and a "fuller, live" sound. Using fewer operatic elements than the previous album, in an attempt to create a more radio-friendly pop record, Poses addresses debauchery and love in less esoteric means. Guests on the album include Wainwright's sister, Martha Wainwright, fellow singer-songwriter Teddy Thompson, and rock musician Melissa Auf der Maur.

All tracks were written by Wainwright except for "Shadows", which was co-written by Alex Gifford, and "One Man Guy", a song written and originally performed by Wainwright's father, Loudon Wainwright III. The bonus track "Across the Universe" is a Lennon–McCartney song that Wainwright recorded initially for the 2001 film I Am Sam, and later re-recorded with producer Greg Wells for Poses.

Poses debuted at No. 117 on the Billboard 200, and Wainwright ranked No. 1 on Billboard magazine's Top Heatseekers chart. He won the Outstanding Music Album award at the 2002 GLAAD Media Awards, and at the Juno Awards of 2002 was nominated for Best Songwriter and took home the award for Best Alternative Album. Several years following its release, Poses was certified gold by the Canadian Recording Industry Association and included on Mojo's "100 Modern Classics" list and on Out magazine's "100 Greatest, Gayest Albums" list.

== Development ==
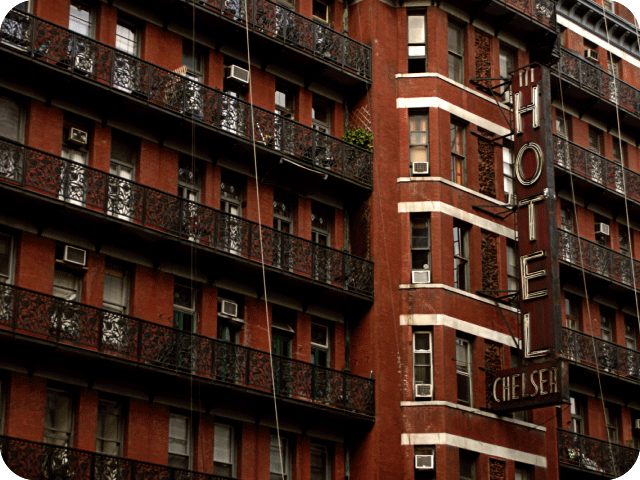
Hotel Chelsea, where Wainwright wrote most of the album

Wainwright's goal was to make a pop record to "show that [he] can get up from behind the piano and that [he's] actually pretty compatible with other people of [his] age out there." He teamed up with producer Pierre Marchand, a family friend who often worked with Wainwright's mother and aunt (Kate and Anna McGarrigle), and had helped him record several demo tapes prior to being signed to DreamWorks. Musicians Melissa Auf der Maur and Teddy Thompson also appear on the album, as does Wainwright's sister Martha Wainwright. Several tracks were produced by Greg Wells, Alex Gifford, Ethan Johns, and Damian LeGassick. The album took a year and a half to record – half the time it took him to record his first album.

According to Wainwright, Poses grew thematically out of its title track, which was inspired by his residency at New York City's infamous Chelsea Hotel. Referring to his stay there, he recalled: "I went to all these parties and met all these people and found that, basically, it's like a big revolving door. I thought if I could look at it as a series of poses and extract from it what I needed for my songs, then I would survive." Describing his writing process, Wainwright stated he typically comes up with a melody line and starts singing phonetically, from which words often appear. To promote the album prior to its release, Wainwright embarked on a tour throughout the United States and Canada.

== Songs and themes ==
Debauchery is a primary theme throughout the album, stemming from Wainwright's struggles with addiction and quest for fame. "Cigarettes and Chocolate Milk" best reflects this motif, directly addressing decadence and desire ("Everything it seems I like's a little bit sweeter/A little bit fatter, a little bit harmful for me"). The song has been called an "ode to subtle addictions and the way our compulsions rule our lives." The music video for "Cigarettes and Chocolate Milk", directed by Giles Dunning and released by DreamWorks in 2001, features Wainwright performing the song at a piano inside a warehouse and scenes of him walking around Los Angeles.

Asserting that successful pop albums evoke a particular lifestyle that other people have experienced, Rolling Stone's Ben Ratliff claims Poses does just that, manifesting the "young, gay, narcissistic achiever in New York". "But", Ratliff clarifies, "the Chelsea Boy is only a magnified version of practically every kid new to a big city who's got a job and an apartment and worries about weekend plans: The Chelsea Boy just has sharper clothes, higher standards of beauty and a better tradition of mordant humor to console himself with."

An "ode to queer love", "Greek Song" touches on beauty, passion, and adventure while incorporating Asian string instruments. The melody was taken from the "Cherry Duet" in Pietro Mascagni's opera L'amico Fritz.

Pitchfork's Joe Tangari complimented the title track, stating that it "stands as one of Wainwright's finest songs, with an aching melody and Spartan piano backing." The song is semi-autobiographical, mirroring Wainwright's struggles with addiction and desire for fame ("I did go from wanting to be someone/Now I'm drunk and wearing flip-flops on Fifth Avenue").

Coated with thickly layered vocal harmonies, "Shadows" was co-written and produced by Propellerheads' Alex Gifford. Rolling Stone said the following of the track: "['Shadows'] keeps a dry funk drumbeat, a dab of piano chords, some low clarinet lines and, finally, a swarm of seraphic, multitracked voices; it's one of the many songs on the album that build up to moments of cinematic perfection, in which your goose bumps are exactly the ones Wainwright intended." The programmed beats on "The Tower of Learning" were contributed by contemporary composer Damien LeGassick.

The music video for "California", also directed by Giles Dunning, features Wainwright performing the song karaoke-style while reading lyrics from a monitor that projects a black-and-white video of Rufus and Martha dressed in 1940s garb. The video also features Wainwright and his band performing the song out of character.

"The Tower of Learning", originally written for Baz Luhrmann's 2001 film Moulin Rouge!, was resurrected when Wainwright "saw this guy whose eyes were very beautiful, and all of a sudden the whole subject of falling into someone's eyes and how electrifying that can be" inspired him. "Grey Gardens" is a tribute to the documentary film of the same name and Thomas Mann's Death in Venice, written as if Tadzio (a character from the novel) is in the Beales' mansion and Wainwright is "Little Edie".

"Rebel Prince", once described as flag-wavingly homoerotic, tells the story of a hotel resident waiting for his prince to rescue him before he "[rids his] dirty mind of all of its preciousness." Written from the perspective of a companion praising his queen, "The Consort" sounds of a "dusty minuet beamed in from the harpsichord Elizabethan age." "One Man Guy", originally written by Wainwright's father (folk musician Loudon Wainwright III), features vocals by friend Teddy Thompson and Wainwright's sister Martha Wainwright. Tangari called the cover "faithful and endearing", admitting Wainwright's performance "proves [he] has at least a touch of dad's folk roots in him."

Wainwright said the following of "Evil Angel":

'Evil Angel' is an interesting song. It's actually to do with a journalist who, uh... I was in France at the time and quite delicate... and this guy basically seduced me in Strasbourg... he gave me a tour of the town and it was very romantic, and we did actually make out in the middle of this town square... and then I went and did the show and I never heard from him again. And I just felt incredibly used. I think a lot of it has to do with, once you get into this business, you do have to become some kind of a machine. You do have to be heartless at times and be able to plough through certain situations. I don't want to totally become that person, but it's good that I'm thinking about it.

The simple "In a Graveyard" has been described as a "soulful reflection on moribund themes that momentarily leaves the oboes and strings at the door for a direct heart-to-heart with the listener." The music video for "Across the Universe", originally used to promote I Am Sam, was directed by Len Wiseman and released through V2 Records. The Lennon–McCartney track appeared on the soundtrack to the film, but was re-recorded to become a bonus track for the reissue of Poses.

== Critical reception ==
Professional ratings
Aggregate scores
Source	Rating
Metacritic	82/100
Review scores
Source	Rating
AllMusic	4/5 stars
Alternative Press	8/10
Entertainment Weekly	A
The Guardian	3/5 stars
NME	8/10
Pitchfork	8.6/10
Q	4/5 stars
Rolling Stone	4/5 stars
The Rolling Stone Album Guide	4/5 stars
Spin	7/10

Overall, reception of the album was positive. AllMusic's Zac Johnson called the album "spectacular", "brimming over with Wainwright's trademark popera and young romantic wishes." He further described Poses as "beautifully discordant and sonically chilling", but an album that "often hints at warm grins with mischievous winks." In his review for Pitchfork, Joe Tangari characterized Poses as an "epic album that speaks with grand gestures and a refined eloquence rare in young songwriters." In addition, Tangari complimented Wainwright's ability to express himself and suggested that his voice had improved, becoming less of an acquired taste. Blender's Lisa Gidley asserted the album cemented Wainwright as the "most sardonic iconoclast", and that well-worn topics from obsession to culture shock are "skewered in fresh ways." Raidió Teilifís Éireann contributor Tom Grealis stated Poses is "infused with a rare charm and wit, magnified by Wainwright's sharp lyrical touch and vocal melodies", and that "Papa must be proud."

Some were more critical of the album. Referring to the numerous producers and guest artists who collaborated with Wainwright on the album, Johnson stated the album's "'group' feel suffers only slightly from being less intimate" than Wainwright's debut album. The Guardian's John Aizlewood praised Poses for being brighter and more focused than Rufus Wainwright, but described the title track as dreary and "Shadows" as "schmaltzy". Sal Cinquemani of Slant described Wainwright as "gloriously pompous", partly due to the "pretentious" French verses and the "blaring" French horns sprinkled throughout the album.

Following is a table of 2001 "end of year" list placements by various publications:

Publication	Country	Accolade	Rank
Aftonbladet	Sweden	Top 100 Albums of 2001	97
NME	UK	Albums of the Year 2001	8
Q	UK	Q's Best Albums of 2001	37
VH1	U.S.	Best of the Year	10
Washington City Paper	U.S.	Top 20 of 2001	13

== Commercial performance ==
While album sales were limited, with Poses debuting at No. 117 on the Billboard 200, Wainwright ranked No. 1 on Billboard's Top Heatseekers chart. The album failed to chart in any other countries. In 2004, Poses reached No. 103 on the Billboard 200. As of 2002, sales in the United States have exceeded 137,000 copies, according to Nielsen SoundScan.

Wainwright was nominated for Solo Artist of the Year in the music category of GQ magazine's 2001 Men of the Year awards. For its critical acclaim and success within the gay community, Poses was awarded Outstanding Music Album at the 2002 GLAAD Media Awards, an awards ceremony sponsored by the Gay & Lesbian Alliance Against Defamation (GLAAD). At the Juno Awards of 2002, Wainwright was nominated for Best Songwriter for "Poses", "Cigarettes and Chocolate Milk", and "Grey Gardens"; Poses won the award for Best Alternative Album. Mojo magazine's "100 Modern Classics" list, published in 2006, placed the album at No. 95. In September 2007, Poses was certified gold by the Canadian Recording Industry Association. In 2008, Out magazine ranked Poses No. 50, and Wainwright's third studio album, Want One, No. 80 on their "100 Greatest, Gayest Albums" list.

Chart (2001)	Peak position
U.S. Billboard 200	117
U.S. Billboard's Top Heatseekers	1
Chart (2004)	Peak position
U.S. Billboard 200	103

Country	Certification
Canada	Gold

== Track listing ==
All tracks are written by Rufus Wainwright, except where noted.

No.	Title	Music	Length
1.	"Cigarettes and Chocolate Milk"		4:44
2.	"Greek Song"		3:56
3.	"Poses"		5:02
4.	"Shadows"	Alex Gifford, Wainwright	5:35
5.	"California"		3:23
6.	"The Tower of Learning"		4:47
7.	"Grey Gardens"		3:08
8.	"Rebel Prince"		3:44
9.	"The Consort"		4:25
10.	"One Man Guy"	Loudon Wainwright III	3:31
11.	"Evil Angel"		4:43
12.	"In a Graveyard"		2:22
13.	"Cigarettes and Chocolate Milk" (reprise)		3:59

Bonus track
No.	Title	Music	Length
14.	"Across the Universe"	Lennon–McCartney	4:10

== Personnel ==
- Rufus Wainwright – vocals (1–13), piano (1,3–9,12–13), string arrangements (1–3,11,13), dobro (2,5), acoustic guitar (5,11), keyboards (7), guitar (8)
- Stephanie Allard – violin (1,3,11,13)
- Carla Antoun – cello (1,3,11,13)
- Gregg Arreguini – guitar (8–9)
- Melissa Auf der Maur – bass guitar (11), backing vocals (11)
- Genevieve Beaudry – violin (1,3,11,13)
- Melanie Belair – violin (1,3,11,13)
- Jeffrey Bunnell – trumpet (9)
- Brigid Button – violin (6)
- Sarah Button – violin (6)
- Butch Norton – drums (5), percussion (5)
- Richard Causon – chamberlin (5), Wurlitzer (5), Hammond B3 (5), backing vocals (5)
- Michael Vincent Chaves – guitar (8–9)
- Bernadette Colomine – backing vocals (2)
- Yves Desrosiers – banjo (1,13), guitar (1–2,11,13), slide guitar (2), mandolin (2)
- Julie Dupras – viola (1,3,11,13)
- Laura Fairhurst – cello (6)
- Dennis Farias – trumpet (9)
- Normand Forget – oboe (1,3,11,13)
- Alex Gifford – bass guitar (4), guitar (4), piano (4), alto flute (4), bass clarinet (4)
- Christine Giguere – cello (1,3,11,13)
- Greg Hay – viola (1,3,11,13)
- Jeff Hill – bass guitar (1,3,5,11,13), backing vocals (5)
- Wilma Hos – viola (1,3,11,13)
- Kevin Hupp – drums (2–3,11)
- Victor Indrizzo – additional drums (8)
- Ethan Johns – electric guitars (5), drums (7), guitar (7)
- Jim Keltner – drums (1,9,13)
- Jean-Marc LeBlanc – violin (1,3,11,13)
- Damian LeGassick – keyboards (6), drum programming (6), guitar (6), string arrangement (6)
- Jon Lewis – lead trumpet (9)
- Pierre Marchand – string arrangements (1–3,11,13), bass (2,7–9), piano (2)
- Ally McErlaine – guitar (6)
- Jean Paquin – French horn (1–2,11,13)
- Veronique Potuin – viola (1,3,11,13)
- Ian Rathbone – viola (6)
- Julianna Raye – backing vocals (5)
- Daniel Savant – leader (9)
- Pierre Savoie – French horn (1–2,11,13)
- Steve Sidelnyk – drum programming (6)
- Hilary Skewes – cello (6)
- Ash Sood – drums (8)
- Anjana Srinivasan – violin (2,3)
- Benmont Tench – Hammond B3 organ (7)
- Pete Thomas – drums (4), percussion (4)
- Teddy Thompson – backing vocals (5,10), guitar (10)
- Martha Wainwright – backing vocals (3,5,8,10–11)
- Rebecca Ware – viola (6)
- Greg Wells – drums (13), bass guitar (13), additional keyboards (13)
- Pete Wilson – bass guitar (6)
