= 3rd Battalion =

3rd Battalion may refer to:

== Australia ==
- 3rd Battalion (Australia), an infantry battalion
- 3rd Battalion, Royal Australian Regiment, a parachute infantry battalion
- 3rd Health Battalion
- 3rd Machine Gun Battalion
- 3rd New Guinea Infantry Battalion
- 3rd Pioneer Battalion (Australia)
- 2/3rd Battalion (Australia)
- 2/3rd Machine Gun Battalion
- 2/3rd Pioneer Battalion

== Belgium ==
- 3rd Paratroopers Battalion (Belgium)
- 1/3rd Lancers Battalion

== Canada ==
- 3rd Battalion, CEF
- 3rd Battalion (Toronto Regiment), CEF
- 3rd Battalion, Royal Canadian Regiment
- 3rd Battalion, The Victoria Volunteer Rifles of Montreal
- The Loyal Edmonton Regiment (3rd Battalion, Princess Patricia's Canadian Light Infantry)

== France ==
- 3rd Foreign Parachute Battalion
- 3rd Vietnamese Parachute Battalion

== (British) India ==
- 3rd Battalion Bombay Sepoys
- 3rd Battalion Coast Sepoys
- 3rd Battalion of the Aurangabad Division
- 3rd Carnatic Battalion

== Italy ==
- 3rd Bersaglieri Battalion "Cernaia"
- 3rd Engineer Battalion "Lario"
- 3rd Grenadiers Battalion "Guardie"
- 3rd Maneuver Logistic Battalion
- 3rd Paratroopers Battalion "Poggio Rusco"
- 3rd Sappers Battalion "Verbano"
- 3rd Signal Battalion "Spluga"
- 3rd Tank Battalion "M.O. Galas"

== Ukraine ==
- 3rd Air Assault Battalion
- 3rd Battalion International Legion
- 3rd International Infantry Battalion
- 3rd Nuclear Power Plant Protection Battalion

== United Kingdom ==
- 3rd Battalion, Argyllshire Local Militia
- 3rd Battalion, Loyal Brecknock Volunteers
- 3rd Battalion, The Mercian Regiment
- 3rd Battalion, Monmouthshire Regiment
- 3rd Battalion, Parachute Regiment
- 3rd Battalion, The Rifles
- 3rd Battalion, Royal Anglian Regiment
- 3rd Battalion, Royal Regiment of Fusiliers
- 3rd Battalion, Royal Regiment of Scotland
- 3rd Battalion, Royal Welsh
- 3rd Battalion, Tower Hamlets Rifles
- 3rd Battalion, Ulster Defence Regiment
- 3rd Battalion, Yorkshire Regiment
- 3rd Battalion, Yorkshire Volunteers
- 3rd Battalion (2nd Devon Militia), Devonshire Regiment
- 3rd Battalion (Royal South Gloucestershire Militia), Gloucestershire Regiment
- 3rd Battalion (Yorkshire Volunteers), The Duke of Wellington's Regiment (West Riding)
- 3rd (1st King's Own Staffordshire Militia) Battalion, South Staffordshire Regiment
- 3rd (1st Norfolk Militia) Battalion, Norfolk Regiment
- 3rd (1st Royal Lancashire Militia) Battalion, King's Own Royal Regiment (Lancaster)
- 3rd (1st Somerset Militia) Battalion, Somerset Light Infantry
- 3rd (1st Warwickshire Militia) Battalion, Royal Warwickshire Regiment
- 3rd (2nd Derbyshire Militia) Battalion, Sherwood Foresters
- 3rd (2nd Royal Lancashire Militia) Battalion, King's (Liverpool Regiment)
- 3rd (2nd Royal Surrey Militia) Battalion, Queen's (Royal West Surrey Regiment)
- 3rd (Bedfordshire Militia) Battalion, Bedfordshire Regiment
- 3rd (Blythswood) Volunteer Battalion, Highland Light Infantry
- 3rd (City of London) Battalion, London Regiment
- 3rd (Clare Militia) Battalion, Royal Munster Fusiliers
- 3rd (Denbigh and Montgomery) Yeomanry Cyclist Battalion
- 3rd (Dorset Militia) Battalion, Dorset Regiment
- 3rd (East Kent Militia) Battalion, Buffs (East Kent Regiment)
- 3rd (Edinburgh Light Infantry Militia) Battalion, Royal Scots
- 3rd (Fermanagh Militia) Battalion, Royal Inniskilling Fusiliers
- 3rd (Hampshire Militia) Battalion, Hampshire Regiment
- 3rd (Highland (Rifle) Militia) Battalion, Seaforth Highlanders
- 3rd (King's County Militia) Battalion, Prince of Wales's Leinster Regiment (Royal Canadians)
- 3rd (Leicestershire Militia) Battalion, Leicestershire Regiment
- 3rd (Militia) Battalion, Northumberland Fusiliers
- 3rd (Reserve) Battalion, Buffs Queen's Own (Royal West Kent Regiment)
- 3rd (Reserve) Battalion, East Lancashire Regiment
- 3rd (Reserve) Battalion, East Surrey Regiment
- 3rd (Reserve) Battalion, East Yorkshire Regiment
- 3rd (Reserve) Battalion, Lancashire Fusiliers
- 3rd (Reserve) Battalion, Loyal North Lancashire Regiment
- 3rd (Reserve) Battalion, Manchester Regiment
- 3rd (Reserve) Battalion, Northamptonshire Regiment
- 3rd (Reserve) Battalion, North Staffordshire Regiment
- 3rd (Reserve) Battalion, Oxfordshire and Buckinghamshire Light Infantry
- 3rd (Reserve) Battalion, Royal Inniskilling Fusiliers
- 3rd (Reserve) Battalion, Royal Munster Fusiliers
- 3rd (Reserve) Battalion, South Lancashire Regiment
- 3rd (Special Reserve) Battalion, Devonshire Regiment
- 3rd (Royal Berkshire Militia) Battalion, Royal Berkshire Regiment
- 3rd (Royal Bucks Militia) Battalion, Oxfordshire Light Infantry
- 3rd (Royal Elthorne Militia) Battalion, Middlesex Regiment
- 3rd (Royal Glamorgan Militia) Battalion, Welsh Regiment
- 3rd (Royal Sussex Militia) Battalion, Royal Sussex Regiment
- 3rd (Royal Westminster Militia) Battalion, Royal Fusiliers
- 3rd (Royal Wiltshire Militia) Battalion, Wiltshire Regiment
- 3rd (South Cork Militia) Battalion, Royal Munster Fusiliers
- 3rd (Sunderland) Volunteer Battalion, Durham Light Infantry
- 3rd (West Kent Militia) Battalion, Queen's Own (Royal West Kent Regiment)
- 3rd (West Suffolk Militia) Battalion, Suffolk Regiment
- 3rd (Worcestershire Militia) Battalion, Worcestershire Regiment
- 3rd Administrative Battalion, Derbyshire Rifle Volunteer Corps
- 3rd Administrative Battalion, Staffordshire Rifle Volunteer Corps
- 3rd Administrative Battalion, Sussex Rifle Volunteer Corps
- 3rd Provisional Battalion (United Kingdom)
- 3rd (Volunteer) Battalion, Cheshire Regiment
- 3rd Volunteer Battalion, Devonshire Regiment
- 3rd Volunteer Battalion, Essex Regiment
- 3rd Volunteer Battalion, Gloucestershire Regiment
- 3rd Volunteer Battalion, Hampshire Regiment
- 3rd Volunteer Battalion, Lancashire Fusiliers
- 3rd Volunteer Battalion, Lincolnshire Regiment
- 3rd Volunteer Battalion, Queen's Own (Royal West Kent Regiment)
- 3rd Volunteer Battalion, Queen's Royal Regiment (West Surrey)
- 3rd (Volunteer) Battalion, Royal Regiment of Wales
- 3rd (Volunteer) Battalion, Royal Welch Fusiliers, TAVR
- 3rd Volunteer Battalion, Royal Welch Fusiliers
- 3rd (Volunteer) Battalion, Staffordshire Regiment
- 3rd Volunteer Battalion, West Yorkshire Regiment
- 3rd/5th Battalion Lancashire Fusiliers
- 4th/3rd Battalion, Royal New South Wales Regiment

== United States ==
=== Confederate States Army ===
- 3rd Mississippi Infantry Battalion

=== Union Army ===
- 3rd Battalion Massachusetts Rifles
- 3rd District of Columbia Infantry Battalion

=== United States Army ===
- 3rd Battalion, 33rd Armor Regiment
- 3rd Battalion, 69th Armor Regiment
- 3rd Battalion, 103rd Armor Regiment
- 3rd Battalion, 10th Aviation Regiment
- 3rd Battalion, 126th Aviation Regiment, Massachusetts National Guard
- 3rd Battalion, 140th Aviation Regiment
- 3rd Battalion, 142nd Aviation Regiment
- 3rd Battalion, 158th Aviation Regiment
- 3rd Battalion, 238th Aviation Regiment
- 3rd Battalion, 501st Aviation Regiment
- 3rd Battalion, 6th Field Artillery Regiment
- 3rd Battalion, 9th Field Artillery Regiment
- 3rd Battalion, 16th Field Artillery Regiment
- 3rd Battalion, 29th Field Artillery Regiment, 3rd Brigade Combat Team
- 3rd Battalion, 84th Field Artillery Regiment
- 3rd Battalion, 319th Field Artillery Regiment
- 3rd Battalion, 320th Field Artillery Regiment
- 3rd Battalion, 321st Field Artillery Regiment
- 3rd Battalion, 10th Infantry Regiment
- 3rd Battalion, 116th Infantry Regiment
- 3rd Battalion, 153rd Infantry Regiment
- 3rd Battalion, 187th Infantry Regiment
- 3rd Battalion, 325th Infantry Regiment
- 3rd Battalion, 20th Special Forces Group
- 3rd Engineer Battalion (United States)
- 3rd Ordnance Battalion
- 3rd Ranger Battalion

=== United States Marine Corps ===
- 3rd Battalion, 1st Marines
- 3rd Battalion, 2nd Marines
- 3rd Battalion, 3rd Marines
- 3rd Battalion, 4th Marines
- 3rd Battalion, 5th Marines
- 3rd Battalion, 6th Marines
- 3rd Battalion, 7th Marines
- 3rd Battalion, 8th Marines
- 3rd Battalion, 9th Marines
- 3rd Battalion, 10th Marines
- 3rd Battalion, 11th Marines
- 3rd Battalion, 12th Marines
- 3rd Battalion, 14th Marines
- 3rd Battalion, 23rd Marines
- 3rd Battalion, 24th Marines
- 3rd Battalion, 25th Marines
- 3rd Battalion, 26th Marines
- 3rd Battalion, 28th Marines
- 3rd Airdrome Battalion
- 3rd Assault Amphibian Battalion
- 3rd Combat Engineer Battalion
- 3rd Dental Battalion
- 3rd Intelligence Battalion
- 3rd Landing Support Battalion
- 3rd Law Enforcement Battalion
- 3rd Light Armored Reconnaissance Battalion
- 3rd Littoral Anti-Air Battalion
- 3rd Littoral Logistics Battalion
- 3rd Low Altitude Air Defense Battalion
- 3rd Maintenance Battalion
- 3rd Marine Raider Battalion
- 3rd Marine Special Operations Battalion
- 3rd Materiel Readiness Battalion
- 3rd Medical Battalion
- 3rd Radio Battalion
- 3rd Reconnaissance Battalion
- 3rd Recruit Training Battalion
- 3rd Shore Party Battalion
- 3rd Supply Battalion
- 3rd Tank Battalion
- 3rd Transportation Battalion

== Other countries ==
- 3rd Infantry Battalion (Albania)
- 3rd Para-Commando Battalion, Bangladesh
- 3rd Single Infantry Battalion, Estonia
- 3rd Lithuanian Construction Battalion, Nazi Germany
- 3rd Infantry Battalion (Ireland)
- 3rd Kenya Rifles Battalion
- 3rd New Zealand Entrenching Battalion
- 3rd Battalion of the Military Units of the Uprising Emergency of Socialists, Polish Socialist Party – Freedom, Equality, Independence; part of the Polish resistance movement in World War II
- 3rd Lithuanian Fusilier Reserve Battalion, Prussia

== See also ==
- 3rd Army (disambiguation)
- III Corps (disambiguation)
- 3rd Division (disambiguation)
- 3rd Brigade (disambiguation)
- 3rd Regiment (disambiguation)
- 3rd Squadron (disambiguation)
- 3rd (disambiguation)
