= III Corps =

3rd Corps, Third Corps, III Corps, or 3rd Army Corps may refer to:

== Finland ==
- III Corps (Finland, Winter War)
- III Corps (Finland, Continuation War)

== France ==
- 3rd Army Corps (France)
- III Cavalry Corps (Grande Armée), a cavalry unit of the Imperial French Army during the Napoleonic Wars
- III Corps (Grande Armée), a unit of the Imperial French Army during the Napoleonic Wars

== Germany ==
=== German Empire ===
- III Cavalry Corps (German Empire), Imperial German Army
- III Corps (German Empire), Imperial German Army
- III Reserve Corps, Imperial German Army
- III Royal Bavarian Corps, Bavarian Army and the Imperial German Army

=== Nazi Germany ===
- III Army Corps (Wehrmacht)
- III Flak Corps, Luftwaffe, Wehrmacht
- III Luftwaffe Field Corps, Wehrmacht
- III (Germanic) SS Panzer Corps, Waffen-SS

=== Bundeswehr ===
- III Corps (Bundeswehr)

== Russia and Soviet Union ==
=== Russian Empire ===
- 3rd Army Corps (Russian Empire)
- 3rd Caucasus Army Corps
- 3rd Cavalry Corps (Russian Empire)
- 3rd Siberian Army Corps

=== Russian Civil War ===
- 3rd Army Corps (Armed Forces of South Russia)
- 3rd Steppe Siberian Corps
- 3rd Ural Corps

=== Soviet Union ===
- 3rd Airborne Corps
- 3rd Cavalry Corps (Soviet Union)
- 3rd Guards Cavalry Corps
- 3rd Guards Fighter Aviation Corps
- 3rd Guards Mechanized Corps
- 3rd Guards Tank Corps
- 3rd Mechanized Corps
- 3rd Mechanized Corps (1940 formation)
- 3rd Rifle Corps
- 3rd Tank Corps

=== Russian Federation ===
- 3rd Army Corps (Russia), Russian Federation

== United Kingdom ==
- III Anti-Aircraft Corps
- III Corps (United Kingdom)
- 3rd (Northern) Buckinghamshire Volunteer Corps

=== Artillery Volunteer Corps ===
- 3rd (Aberdeen) Aberdeenshire Artillery Volunteer Corps
- 3rd (Beaumaris) Anglesey Artillery Volunteer Corps
- 3rd (Oban) Argyllshire Artillery Volunteer Corps
- 3rd (Largs) Ayrshire Artillery Volunteer Corps
- 3rd (Banff) Banffshire Artillery Volunteer Corps
- 3rd (Gardenstown) Banffshire Artillery Volunteer Corps
- 3rd (Lybster) Caithness Artillery Volunteer Corps
- 3rd (Seacombe) Cheshire Artillery Volunteer Corps
- 3rd (Fowey) Cornwall Artillery Volunteer Corps
- 3rd (Maryport) Cumberland Artillery Volunteer Corps
- 3rd (Teignmouth) Devonshire Artillery Volunteer Corps
- 3rd (Bridport) Dorsetshire Artillery Volunteer Corps
- 3rd (Dumbarton) Dumbartonshire Artillery Volunteer Corps
- 3rd (South Shields) Durham Artillery Volunteer Corps
- 3rd (Stratford) Essex Artillery Volunteer Corps
- 3rd (St Andrews) Fife Artillery Volunteer Corps
- 3rd (Broughty Ferry) Forfarshire Artillery Volunteer Corps
- 3rd (Portsmouth Dockyard) Hampshire Artillery Volunteer Corps
- 3rd (Cardiff) Glamorganshire Artillery Volunteer Corps
- 3rd (Gloucester) Gloucestershire Artillery Volunteer Corps
- 3rd (St Cyrus) Kincardineshire Artillery Volunteer Corps
- 3rd (Glasgow) Lanarkshire Artillery Volunteer Corps
- 3rd (Portobello) Midlothian Artillery Volunteer Corps
- 3rd (Shapinsay) Orkney Artillery Volunteer Corps
- 3rd (Greenock) Renfrewshire Artillery Volunteer Corps
- 3rd (Balmacara) Ross-shire Artillery Volunteer Corps
- 3rd (Aldeburgh) Suffolk Artillery Volunteer Corps
- 3rd (Sandhead) Wigtownshire Artillery Volunteer Corps
- 3rd (Hull) Yorkshire (East Riding) Artillery Volunteer Corps
- 3rd (Scarborough) Yorkshire (North Riding) Artillery Volunteer Corps

=== Rifle Volunteer Corps ===
- 3rd (Crickhowell) Brecknockshire Rifle Volunteer Corps
- 3rd (Carnarvon) Carnarvonshire Rifle Volunteer Corps
- 3rd City of Edinburgh Rifle Volunteer Corps
- 3rd City of London Rifle Volunteer Corps
- 3rd (Denbigh and Ruabon) Denbighshire Rifle Volunteer Corps
- 3rd (Chesterfield) Derbyshire Rifle Volunteer Corps
- 3rd (Devonport Dockyard) Devonshire Rifle Volunteer Corps
- 3rd (Upottery) Devonshire Mounted Rifle Volunteer Corps
- 3rd (Sunderland) Durham Rifle Volunteer Corps
- 3rd Essex Rifle Volunteer Corps
- 3rd (Vale of Clwyd) Flintshire Rifle Volunteer Corps
- 3rd (Swansea Rifles) Glamorganshire Rifle Volunteer Corps
- 3rd (Gloucester City) Gloucestershire Rifle Volunteer Corps
- 3rd (Ramsey Rifles) Isle of Man Rifle Volunteer Corps
- 3rd (2nd Ryde) Isle of Wight Rifle Volunteer Corps
- 3rd Kent (Blackheath) Rifle Volunteer Corps
- 3rd Kent (West Kent) Rifle Volunteer Corps
- 3rd (Melton Company) Leicestershire Rifle Volunteer Corps
- 3rd (Bathgate) Linlithgowshire Rifle Volunteer Corps
- 3rd (Corwen) Merionethshire Rifle Volunteer Corps
- 3rd (Welshpool) Montgomeryshire Rifle Volunteer Corps
- 3rd (Northampton) Northamptonshire Rifle Volunteer Corps
- 3rd Perthshire (The Perthshire Highland) Rifle Volunteer Corps
- 3rd (Hanley) Staffordshire Rifle Volunteer Corps
- 3rd Surrey Rifle Volunteer Corps
- 3rd (Truman, Hanbury, Buxton) Tower Hamlets Rifle Volunteer Corps
- 3rd Warwickshire Rifle Volunteer Corps
- 3rd (Bradford) Yorkshire West Riding Rifle Volunteer Corps
- 3rd (Howdenshire) Yorkshire (East Riding) Rifle Volunteer Corps
- 3rd (Hull) Yorkshire (East Riding) Rifle Volunteer Corps

== United States ==
- III Amphibious Corps, United States Marine Corps
- III Armored Corps, United States Army

=== American Civil War ===
- III Corps (Union Army)
- Third Corps, Army of Northern Virginia
- Third Corps, Army of Tennessee

=== Spanish–American War ===
- Third Army Corps (Spanish–American War)

== Yugoslavia ==
- 3rd Aviation Corps, Yugoslavia
- 3rd Corps of Air Force and Air Defense, Yugoslavia
- 3rd Corps (Yugoslav Partisans)

== Others ==
- 3rd Army Corps (Armenia)
- 3rd Army Corps (Azerbaijan)
- III Corps (Australia)
- 3rd Corps (Army of the Republic of Bosnia and Herzegovina)
- 3rd Corps (People's Republic of China)
- III Army Corps (Greece)
- III Corps (India)
- 3rd Corps (Iraq)
- III Army Corps (Italy)
- III Corps (North Korea)
- III Corps (Ottoman Empire)
- Pakistan Army III Corps
- III Corps (South Korea)
- III Corps (South Vietnam)
- 3rd Corps (Syria)
- 3rd Corps (Turkey)
- 3rd Army Corps (Ukraine)
- 3rd Corps (Vietnam)

== See also ==
- List of military corps by number
- 3rd Army (disambiguation)
- 3rd Division (disambiguation)
- 3rd Brigade (disambiguation)
- 3rd Regiment (disambiguation)
- 3rd Battalion (disambiguation)
- 3rd Squadron (disambiguation)
- 3rd (disambiguation)
