= 3rd Army Division =

3rd Army Division may refer to:

- 3rd Army Division (Argentina)
- 3rd Army Division (Peru)
- 3rd Army Division (Sweden)

== See also ==
- 3rd Army (disambiguation)
- 3rd Division (disambiguation)
