= 3rd Guards Division =

3rd Guards Division may refer to:

- 3rd Guards Division (Imperial Japanese Army)
- 3rd Guards Infantry Division (German Empire)
- 3rd Guards Infantry Division (Russian Empire)
- 3rd Guards Airborne Division, Soviet Union
- 3rd Guards Anti-Aircraft Artillery Division, Soviet Union
- 3rd Guards Motor Rifle Division, Soviet Union
- 3rd Guards Tank Division, Soviet Union

== See also ==
- 3rd Guard Division, People's Republic of China
- 3rd Interior Guard Division, People's Republic of China
- 3rd Division (disambiguation)
