= 3rd Reserve Division =

3rd Reserve Division may refer to:

- 3rd Reserve Division (German Empire)
- 3rd Reserve Division (People's Republic of China)

== See also ==
- 3rd Division (disambiguation)
