= 3rd Brigade Combat Team =

3rd Brigade Combat Team or 3 BCT is a modularized brigade of the United States Army. It may refer to:

- 3rd Brigade Combat Team, 1st Infantry Division (United States)
- 3rd Brigade Combat Team, 1st Cavalry Division (United States)
- 3rd Brigade Combat Team, 1st Armored Division (United States)
- 3rd Brigade Combat Team, 2nd Infantry Division (United States)
- 3rd Brigade Combat Team, 3rd Infantry Division (United States)
- 3rd Brigade Combat Team, 4th Infantry Division (United States)
- 3rd Brigade Combat Team, 10th Mountain Division (United States)
- 3rd Brigade Combat Team, 25th Infantry Division (United States)
- 3rd Brigade Combat Team, 82nd Airborne Division
- 3rd Brigade Combat Team, 101st Airborne Division (United States)

== See also ==
- 3rd Division (disambiguation)
- 3rd Brigade (disambiguation)
- 3rd Regiment (disambiguation)
- 3rd Squadron (disambiguation)
