= 3rd Fighter Division =

3rd Fighter Division may refer to:

- 3rd Fighter Division (China)
- 3rd Fighter Division (Germany)

== See also ==
- 3rd Division (disambiguation)
