= 3rd Infantry Brigade =

3rd Infantry Brigade can refer to:

- 3rd Infantry Brigade (Georgia)
- 3rd Infantry Brigade (Lebanon)
- 3rd Infantry Brigade (South Africa)
- 3rd Infantry Brigade (United Kingdom)
- 3rd Infantry Brigade, 2nd Infantry Division (United States)
- 3rd Canadian Infantry Brigade

== See also ==
- 3rd Brigade
- 3rd Brigade Combat Team
