= Third Army =

Third Army may refer to:

== Germany ==
- 3rd Army (German Empire), a World War I field Army
- 3rd Army (Wehrmacht), a World War II field army
- 3rd Panzer Army

== Russia and Soviet Union ==
- 3rd Air Army
- 3rd Army (Russian Empire)
- 3rd Army (RSFSR)
- 3rd Army (Soviet Union)
- 3rd Guards Army
- 3rd Guards Combined Arms Army
- 3rd Guards Tank Army
- 3rd Manchurian Army
- Third Reserve Army of Observation
- 3rd Shock Army
- 3rd Ukrainian Soviet Army

== Others ==
- 3rd Army (Austria-Hungary)
- Revolutionary 3rd Army, Brazil
- Third Army (Bulgaria)
- Third Field Army, Chinese Civil War
- 3rd Army (France)
- Third Army (Egypt)
- Third Army (Hungary)
- 3rd Army (Italy)
- Third Army (Japan)
- Third Air Army (Japan)
- Third Area Army, Japan
- Third Army (Ottoman Empire)
- Third Army (Romania)
- Third Army (Serbia)
- 3rd Army (South Korea)
- Third Army (Turkey)
- Third Army (United Kingdom)
- Third Army (Home Forces), United Kingdom
- Third Army (United States)
- 3rd Army (Kingdom of Yugoslavia)
- 3rd Territorial Army (Kingdom of Yugoslavia)
- 3rd Army (Yugoslav Partisans)

== See also ==
- Patton's 3rd Army, a boardgame
- List of armies by number
- III Corps (disambiguation)
- 3rd Division (disambiguation)
- 3rd Brigade (disambiguation)
- 3rd Regiment (disambiguation)
- 3rd Battalion (disambiguation)
- 3rd Squadron (disambiguation)
- 3rd (disambiguation)
