= 39th Brigade Special Troops Battalion =

Special Troops Battalion, 39th Infantry Brigade Combat Team
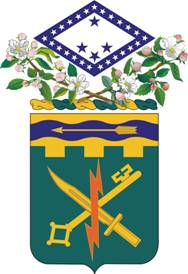
- Special Troops Battalion, 39th IBCT Coat of Arms
- Active: 2005–2018
- Country: United States of America
- Allegiance: United States of America
- Branch: United States Army National Guard
- Size: Battalion
- Garrison/HQ: Conway, Arkansas (headquarters)
- Nickname: "Ready"
- Motto: Utrinque Paratus

Commanders
- Battalion Commander: LTC Derald R. Neugebauer

Insignia
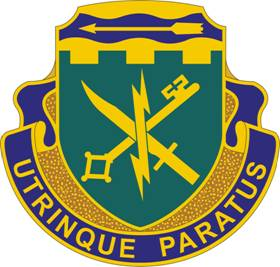
- Special Troops Battalion, Distinctive Unit Insignia

- 39th Infantry Brigade Combat Team shoulder sleeve insignia

The 39th Infantry Brigade Combat Team's Special Troops Battalion was headquartered in Conway, Arkansas and was an element of the Arkansas Army National Guard. On 15 September 2018, the 39th Special Troops Battalion was reflagged as the 239th Brigade Engineer Battalion, an element of the 39th Infantry Brigade Combat Team.

== Formation ==
The Special Troops Battalion was formed on 1 September 2005 as part of a larger reorganization of the 39th Brigade. The 39th Brigade was transformed from an Enhanced Separate Brigade (ESB) to an Infantry Brigade Combat Team (IBCT) under the United States Army's new Modular Design. This redesign of the army was intended to make the force more easily deployable by making brigades more self-contained and less dependent on support organizations at the division level. Major changes for the 39th Brigade included the activation of its Special Troops Battalion, with headquarters at Conway Arkansas. The STB became the headquarters for formerly separate companies within the brigade:

- Company A (formerly 239th Engineer Company)
- Company B (239th Military Intelligence Company), restationed from Perryville, Arkansas to Little Rock, Arkansas
- Company C (formerly Company D, 212th Signal Battalion)

The STB also served as the battalion headquarters for HHC, 39th IBCT, stationed at Ricks Armory, Little Rock, Arkansas.

== History ==
=== Headquarters and Headquarters Company, formerly Company B, 39th Support Battalion ===
HHC, STB was organized from the former Company B, 39th Support Battalion. As Company B, the unit deployed as a maintenance company for Operation Iraqi Freedom II with the rest of the 39th Brigade to Camp Taji, Iraq. For more information on this deployment, see 39th Brigade Support Battalion.

=== Company A, formerly 239th Engineer Company ===
Company A, stationed in Clarksville, Arkansas was organized from the former 239th Engineer Company. As the 239th Engineer Company, the unit deployed as a part of the 39th Brigade Combat Team to Camp Taji, Iraq in support of Operation Iraqi Freedom II. The unit's two sapper platoons spent much of the deployment mounted on armored HMMWVs as motorized infantry or conducting route clearance operations and escorting Explosive Ordnance Disposal (EOD) Teams. At various times platoons from the 239th Engineers were task organized to the 2nd Squadron, 7th Cavalry Regiment, the 3d Battalion, 153rd Infantry Regiment and the 1st Battalion, 206th Field Artillery Regiment. The company's equipment platoon was engaged in improving force protection at the 39th Brigade's forward operating bases and for conducting civil military operations in the surrounding area.

One of the most important contributions of the 239th Engineers came in the fall of 2004 as they worked to rebuild Abu Nawas Street into the capital's central park. This area of Baghdad had once been a thriving entertainment district, but it had fallen into hard times during the last years of the Saddam Hussein administration. 239th Engineers worked for weeks to clear debris and restore the area as a place for families to gather.

Members of the unit were also assigned to assist with force protection during the Iraqi elections in January 2005. SPC Lyle Rymer II, a soldier of the 239th Engineer Company, was killed by a sniper while providing security at a bridge crossing in Baghdad during the election period.

The 239th Engineer Company redeployed in March 2005 and demobilized with the rest of the 39th Infantry Brigade at Fort Sill, OK.

The exploits of the 239th Engineer Company and their families back in Arkansas were the subject of a TV documentary series that aired on the Discovery Times channel called Off To War.

=== Company B, formerly 239th Intelligence Company ===
Company B was organized from the former 239th Military Intelligence Company, which was originally stationed in Perryville, Arkansas. The unit deployed as a part of the 39th Infantry Brigade in support of Operation Iraqi Freedom II in 2003–2005. The unit was augmented in this deployment by elements of 629th Military Intelligence Battalion, Maryland National Guard and the 223rd Military Intelligence Company, California National Guard.

=== Company C, formerly Company C, 212th Signal Battalion ===
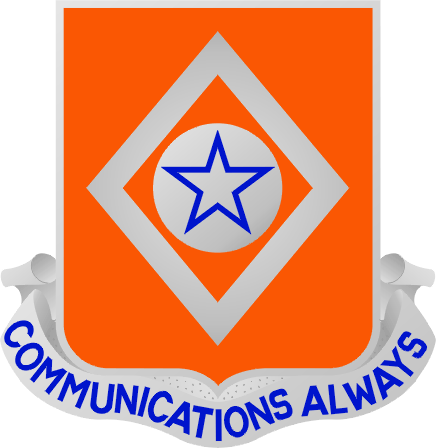
Distinctive Unit Insignia for the former 212th Signal Battalion

Company C, STB was reorganized from Company C, 212th Signal Battalion at Pine Bluff, Arkansas. The Company is now located in White Hall, Arkansas. The 212th Signal Battalion was formerly headquartered in Little Rock, Arkansas, but was inactivated at the same time as the reorganization of the 39th Brigade Combat Team in 2005.

Company C, 212th Signal Battalion was mobilized for Operation Desert Storm in 1990, but did not deploy to theater.

Company C, 212th Signal Battalion deployed to Iraq in support of Operation Iraqi Freedom III from August 2004 to January 2006 as a part of the 155th Heavy Brigade Combat Team. During this tour of duty, the 155th HBCT suffered fifteen fatalities. The Brigade served under the II Marine Expeditionary Force. Elements of Company C were based out of FOB Kalsu and Camp Dogwood.

Company C, STB is additionally entitled to Campaign Participation Credit for the Aleutian Islands Campaign. The company served as a Company D, 1st Battalion, 153d Infantry Regiment during World War II and was stationed in the Aleutian Islands with the rest of the 153rd Infantry Regiment.

=== Operation Iraqi Freedom 08–09 ===
The only element of the STB to mobilize as a unit for a second Operation Iraqi Freedom rotation was Company A. The STB battalion commander was mobilized to act as the 39th IBCT Rear Detachment commander. Soldiers from Company B and Company C were mobilized but deployed with other brigade units.

Company A was organized as a 131-man Convoy Security Company for OIF 08–09. Company A trained at Camp Shelby, Mississippi with the rest of the 39th IBCT prior to deployment and was initially task organized under the 217th Brigade Support Battalion. In theater the company was under the Tactical Control (TACON) of the 142nd Corps Sustainment Support Battalion and was stationed at Talil Air Base.

Company A demobilized at Camp Shelby, Mississippi along with the rest of the 39th IBCT.

== Previous commanders ==
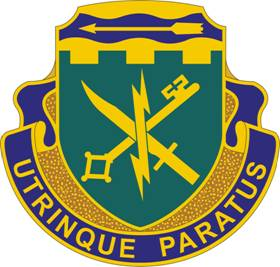
LTC Steven Redman, 2006-2009

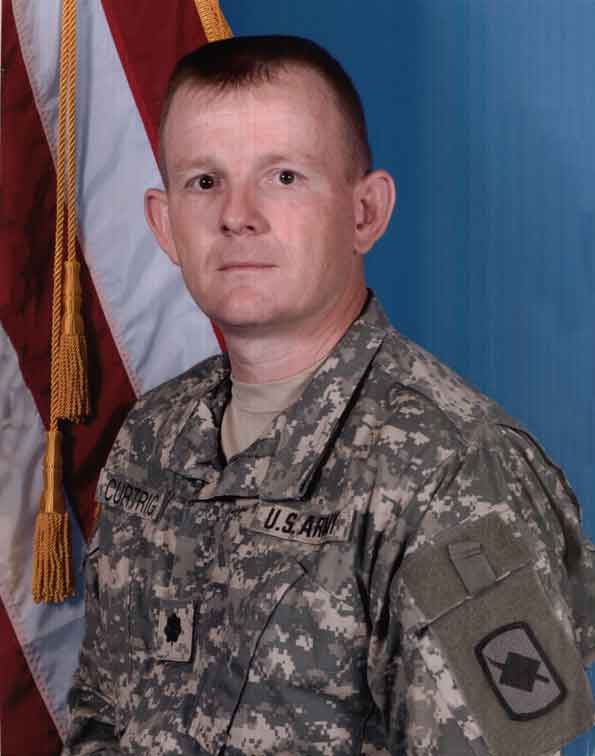
LTC Marty Curtright, 2009-2011,

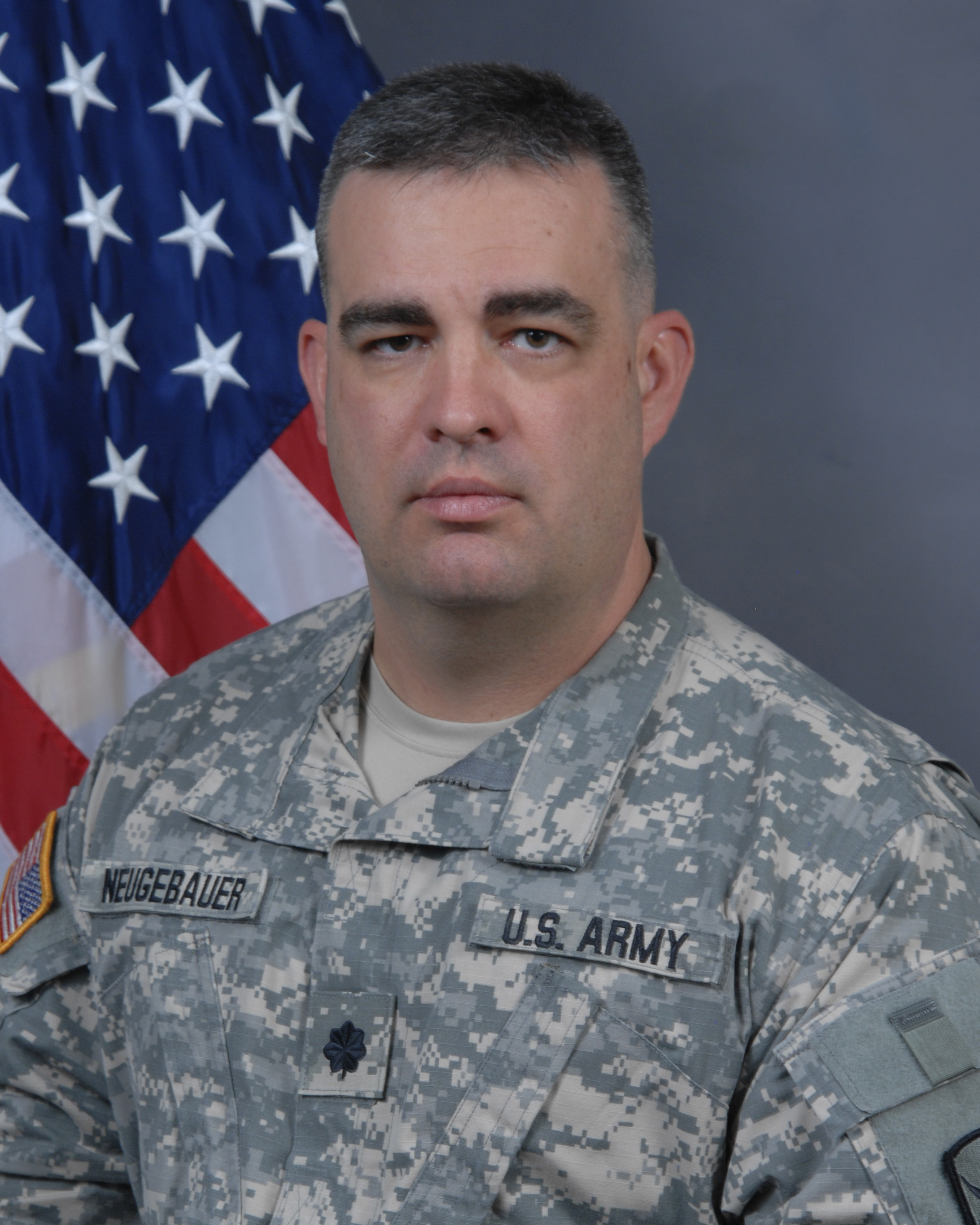
LTC Derald R. Neugebauer, 2011–Present

== Current locations ==
Company	Station locations
Headquarters and Headquarters Company (HHC)	Conway
Company A	Clarksville
Company B	Little Rock
Company C	White Hall

== Heraldic information ==
Distinctive Unit Insignia:

- Description: A Gold color metal and enamel device 1 1/8 inches (2.9 cm) in width overall blazoned as follows: Celeste (Teal Blue), a key bendwise sinister, ward up and inward surmounted by a dagger in saltire point up, overall a lightning bolt palewise Or; on a chief crenelleé of the second, a bar wavy Azure charged with an arrow of the second. Attached below the shield a Blue scroll inscribed "UTRINQUE PARATUS" in Gold.
- Symbolism: The following images combined, comprise the Special Troops Battalion, 39th Infantry Brigade Combat Team: the key symbolizes the Military Intelligence responsibilities, the orange lightning bolt denotes the Signal capabilities, and the embattled chief suggests the Engineer functions. The bowie knife signifies the Brigade's roots of light infantry and the current name Bowie Team. The arrow on the wavy bar, illustrating a river, alludes to the early Indian symbol for the land “Arkansa” or Arkansas, the unit's home state and the fact that the Brigade was once called the Arkansas Brigade.
- Background: The distinctive unit insignia was approved on 16 October 2006.

Coat of Arms.

- Blazon:
- Shield: Celeste (Teal Blue), a key bendwise sinister, ward upward and inward surmounted by a dagger in saltire, point up, Or, overall a lightning bolt palewise Tenné, fimbriated of the second; on a chief crenelleé of the last, a bar wavy Azure charged with an arrow, Or.
- Crest: That for the regiments and separate battalions of the Arkansas Army National Guard: From a wreath Or and Celeste (Teal Blue), above two sprays of apple blossoms Proper a diamond Argent charged with four mullets Azure one in upper point and three in lower within a bordure of the last bearing twenty-five mullets of the second.
- Motto: UTRINQUE PARATUS (Ready For Anything).

Symbolism:

- Shield: The following images combined, comprise the Special Troops Battalion, 39th Infantry Brigade Combat Team: the key symbolizes the Military Intelligence responsibilities, the orange lightning bolt denotes the Signal capabilities, and the embattled chief suggests the Engineer functions. The bowie knife signifies the Brigade's roots of light infantry and the current name Bowie Team. The arrow on the wavy bar, illustrating a river, alludes to the early Indian symbol for the land “Arkansa” or Arkansas, the unit's home state and the fact that the Brigade was once the Arkansas Brigade.
- Crest: The crest is that of the Arkansas Army National Guard.
- Background: The coat of arms was approved on 16 October 2006.
