= 3rd Infantry =

3rd Infantry may refer to:

- 3rd Infantry Regiment (disambiguation)
- 3rd Infantry Brigade (disambiguation)
- 3rd Infantry Division (disambiguation)

== See also ==
- 3rd (disambiguation)
