= Polish 3rd Infantry Division =

Polish 3rd Infantry Division can refer to several formations of that name:

- Polish 3rd Legions Infantry Division (interwar period)
- Polish 3rd Infantry Division (France), 1940
- Polish 3rd Infantry Division (Armia Krajowa), 1944
- Polish 3rd Carpathian Rifle Division (Polish Armed Forces in the West)
- Polish 3rd Infantry Division (Traugutt) (Polish Armed Forces in the East and later communist Polish People's Army)

== See also ==
- 3rd Division (disambiguation)
