= 151st Cavalry Regiment =

United States Army cavalry regiment from 1947 to 2015

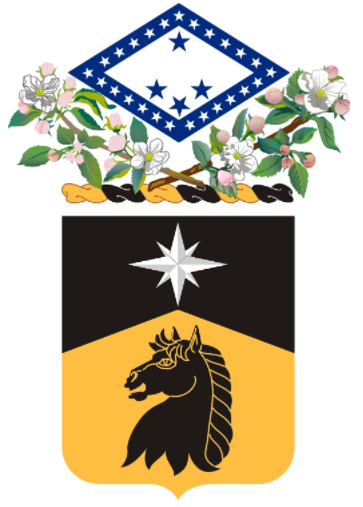
- 151st Cavalry Coat of Arms
- Active: 1947 – 2015
- Country: United States
- Branch: Arkansas Army National Guard
- Role: Motorized cavalry
- Size: Squadron
- Garrison/HQ: Warren, Arkansas
- Nickname: Saber
- Motto: Lead the Way
- Engagements: Iraq War; *Transition of Iraq; *Iraqi Governance; *Iraqi Surge

Insignia
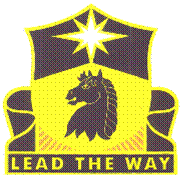
- 151 Cavalry Regiment distinctive unit insignia

The 151st Cavalry Regiment was a United States Army cavalry regiment represented in the Arkansas Army National Guard by 1st Squadron, 151st Cavalry Regiment, headquartered in Warren, Arkansas, an element of the 39th Infantry Brigade Combat Team.

== History ==
=== Background ===
The 151st Cavalry Regiment was originally represented in the Arkansas National Guard by Troop E, 151st Cavalry Regiment from 1967 until the 39th Brigade Combat Team converted to the Modular Brigade Combat Team concept in 2005. At that time, Troop E at Marianna, Arkansas was deactivated and the Regimental Headquarters was moved to Warren, Arkansas. The former 3rd Battalion, 153rd Infantry Regiment was deactivated and its units were organized as the 1st Squadron, 151st Cavalry Regiment.

=== Cold War ===
- 1947, 6 February – 206th Tank Battalion, 39th Infantry Division organized and received federal recognition.
- 1959, 1 June – Reorganized and federally recognized as the 206th Armor Battalion, 39th Infantry Division
- 1968 – 3rd battalion 153 Infantry received federal recognition
- 1983 – Troop E, 151st Cavalry Regiment is awarded the Draper Award, symbolic of the top Armor unit in Readiness and Mobilization, Region VIII.
- 1984 – Troop E, 151st Cavalry Regiment is again awarded the Draper Award, which was the first time in the 60-year history of the award that one unit was selected for the Award two years in a row.
- 1987 – Troop E, 151st Cavalry Regiment fields the M60A3 Tank.

=== Global War on Terrorism ===
==== OIF II ====
12 October 2003, 3-153rd IN and E/151st CAV activated for Operation Iraqi Freedom II and deployment as elements of the 39th Brigade (separate) with the 1st Cavalry Division to Iraq. The 39th Brigade trained at Fort Hood, Texas and Fort Polk, LA before deploying to Iraq in March 2004. Troop E, 151st CAV spent much of the deployment attached to 3-153rd Infantry and was responsible for patrolling the city of Hussainiyah, a town of 500,000 about 12 miles north of Baghdad. At other points in the deployment, E Troop was task organized to 2nd Squadron, 7th Cavalry Regiment and 1st Battalion, 206th Field Artillery. E/151st Cavalry had one platoon of troopers from Company C, 1st Battalion, 102nd Infantry, Connecticut National Guard attached to for OIF II.

==== Reorganization ====
On 5 September 2005, 1st Squadron of the 151st Cavalry Regiment was officially organized and Troop E, 151st Cavalry Regiment deactivated. The squadron headquarters was established at Warren, Arkansas from the former Headquarters and Headquarters Company, 3rd Battalion, 153rd Infantry Regiment. The 1-151st was organized as a reconnaissance, surveillance, and target acquisition squadron.

An infantry brigade combat team reconnaissance squadron is composed of a headquarters and headquarters troop (HHT), two motorized (mounted) recon troops, a dismounted recon troop, and a forward support troop. The HHT is organized like a typical headquarters and headquarters company, with the squadron command group and staff sections. The motorized recon troops consist of a troop headquarters and three scout platoons. The scout platoons consist of six HMMWVs, armed with .50 cal M2 machine guns, 40 mm Mk 19 grenade launchers, M41 TOW improved target acquisition system, M240B machine guns, and are equipped with the Long Range Advanced Scout Surveillance System (LRAS3). Currently, the scout platoons are manned by eighteen 19D cavalry scouts, but recent revisions call for increasing the manning to twenty four scouts.

Women are not eligible to serve in a RSTA unit, as RSTA soldiers are considered a combat unit on the front line of enemy engagement. In practice, however, this regulation only holds true for the 'line' troops (the mounted/dismounted recon troops). The forward support troop, despite being part of the squadron, is technically assigned to the brigade support battalion, allowing female soldiers to serve in a RSTA squadron in non-combat roles such as mechanics, and truck drivers.

==== OIF 08-09 ====
2008, 2 January, 1st Squadron, 151st Cavalry activated for Operation Iraqi Freedom 08-09. The 1-151st Cavalry trained at Camp Shelby, MS from January through February 2008, before deploying to Iraq in March 2008.

Task Force 1-151st CAV, based at Tallil Airbase, consisted of over 800 soldiers assigned to six companies/troops/batteries consisting of active and reserve components. TF 1-151st CAV conducted over 700 tactical convoy security missions, without losing a single soldier due to enemy activity. The task force was responsible for long haul fuel mission between Kuwait and Tallil Air Base and as far north as Balad Air Base. TF 1-151st CAV suffered one non-combat related casualty when a soldier died while working on a vehicle in the motor pool.

===== Order of battle for OIF 08-09 =====
The original task organization of the 1-151st as directed by 39th IBCT during the predeployment training was as follows:

Battalion	Company	Station
1st Squadron, 151 Cavalry Regiment	HHT, 1-151 CAV	Talil Air Base
	Troop B, 1-151 CAV	Talil Air Base
	Troop C, 1-151 CAV	Talil Air Base
	216th Military Police Company, 871st Troop Command	Talil Air Base
	Company D, 39th Support Battalion	Talil Air Base

Once the 1-151st reached Talilli Airbase, it intillally fell under the tactical control of the 1st Brigade, 82nd Airborne Division. On 21 April 2008, the squadron's higher headquarters became the 7th Sustaiment Brigade, of the 3d Sustainment Command (Expeditionary). Upon reaching theater the squadron's task organization was changed. The 1-151st was designated to command and control the following units:

Battalion	Company	Station
1st Squadron, 151st Cavalry Regiment	HHT, 1-151 Cavalry	Talil Air Base
	Troop B, 1-151 Cavalry	Talil Air Base
	Troop C, 1-151 Cavalry	Talil Air Base
	216th Military Police Company, 871st Troop Command	Talil Air Base
	Company D, 39th Support Battalion	Talil Air Base
	Battery B, 1st Battalion, 147th Field Artillery Regiment, SDNG	Talil Air Base
	Battery C, 1st Battalion, 17th Field Artillery Regiment	Talil Air Base

The 1-151 CAV demobilized at Camp Shelby, Mississippi in December 2008.

=== Significant non-combat deployments ===
- 1990, April – Charlie Company " Cold Steel", 3-153rd Infantry conducted annual training in Honduras
- 1992, April – Alpha Company "Regulators", 3-153rd Infantry conducted annual training in Germany.
- 1993, 13– 25 June – Bravo Company "Killer Bees", 3-153rd Infantry conducted annual training in Germany.
- 1999 – Bravo Company "Killer Bees", 3-153rd Infantry Activated for Operation Southern Watch, Saudi Arabia.
- 2000 – Delta Company "Diamondbacks", 3-153rd Infantry activated for SFOR 9 rotation to Bosnia with the 3-7 CAV, 3rd Infantry Division.
- 2002, November – Bravo Company "Killer Bees", 3-153rd Infantry called to state active duty to provide security for the munitions plant in Camden, AR.
- 2005, 28 August – 3-153rd IN Soldiers activated to support the humanitarian relief efforts in the aftermath of Hurricane Katrina in New Orleans, LA.

== Deactivation ==
In 2015, as a part of restructuring, the 151st Cavalry Regiment, was deactivated that the force structure was moved to the state of Nebraska. The 1st Squadron, 134th Cavalry Regiment, Nebraska Army National Guard replaced it as the cavalry squadron assigned to the 39th Infantry Brigade Combat Team.

== Past commanders ==
- CPT James Clark
- CPT Alton R. Lackie
- CPT Travis H. Acklin
- CPT Frederick C. Kearney
- CPT Travis P. Acklin
- CPT Harrell E. Clendenin
- CPT David P. Rinold
- CPT George E. Baker
- CPT Stephen A. Womack
- CPT Joey D. Brannon
- CPT Jerry C. Corrothers
- CPT Leffery W. Johnson
- CPT Ronald Edwards
- CPT Brett W. Stewart
- CPT Ceburn M. Gilliam III
- CPT Derald Neugebauer
- CPT John Fisher
- CPT Derald Neugebauer
- CPT Jeffery Westbrook
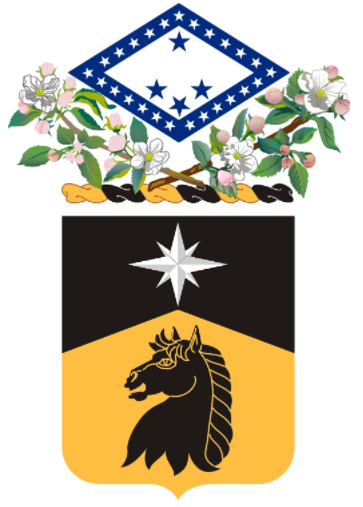
LTC Mark A. Lumpkin, 2005-2006

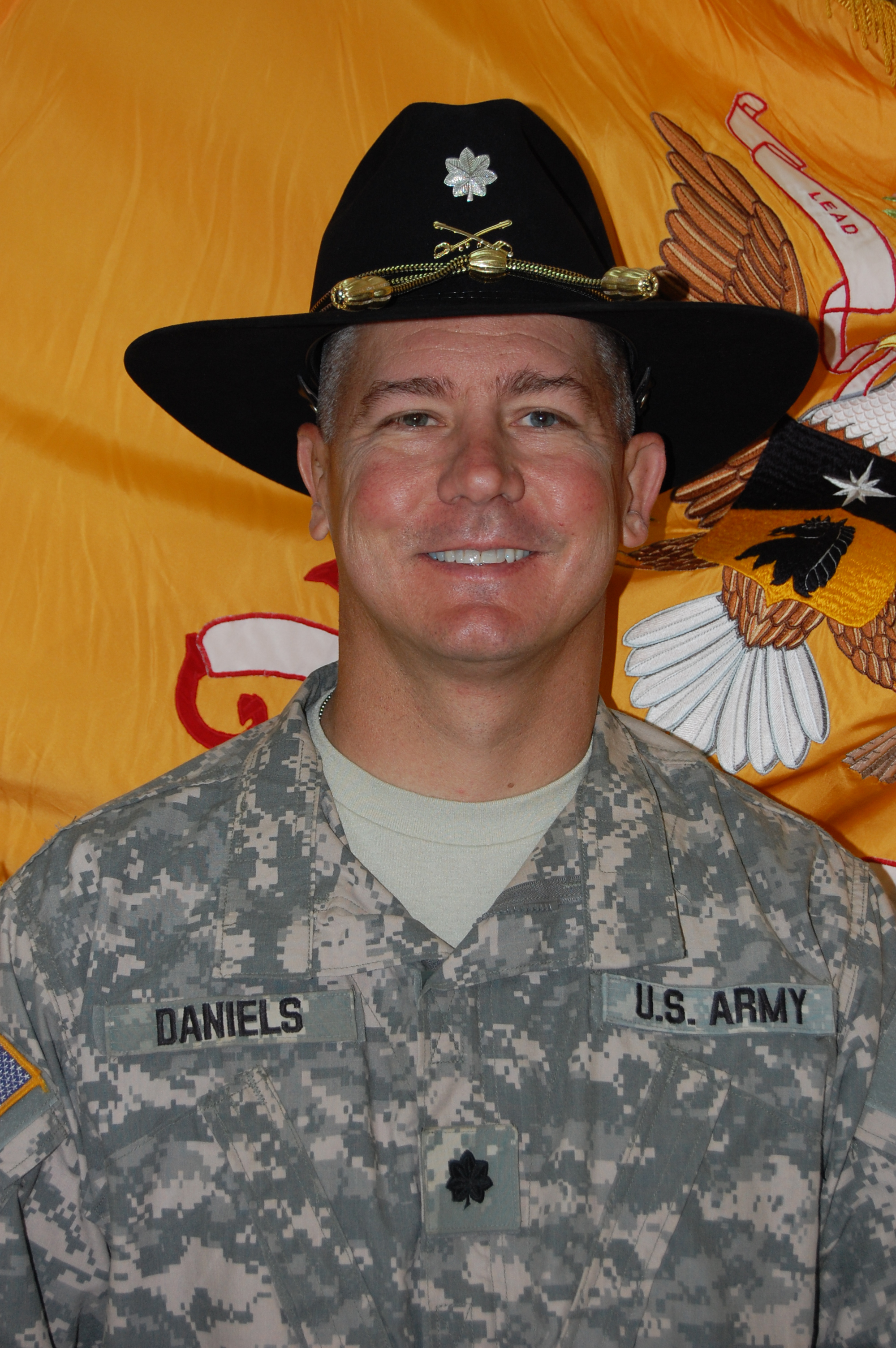
LTC Darrell W. Daniels, 2006-2009

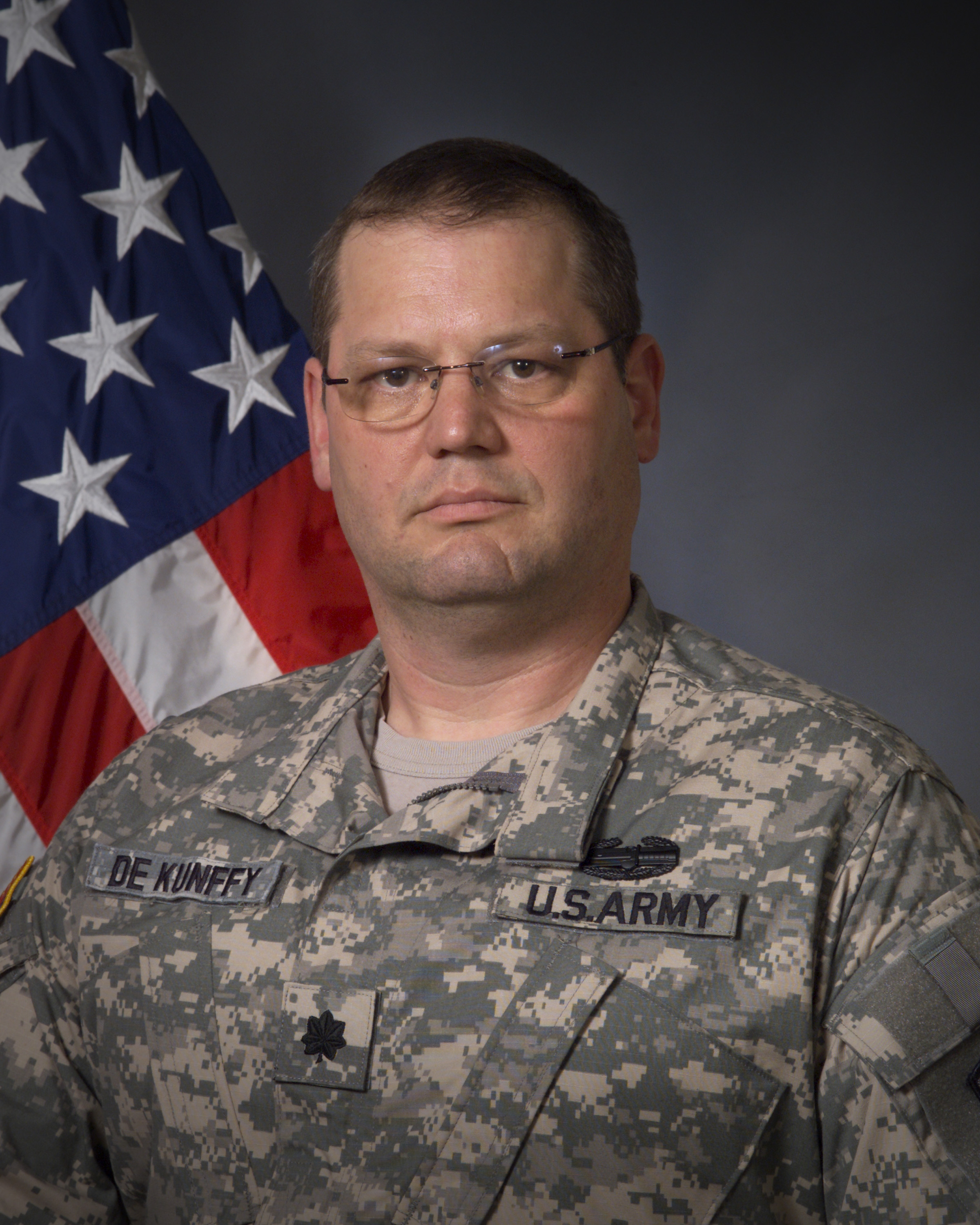
LTC Andreas K de Kunffy, 2009-2010

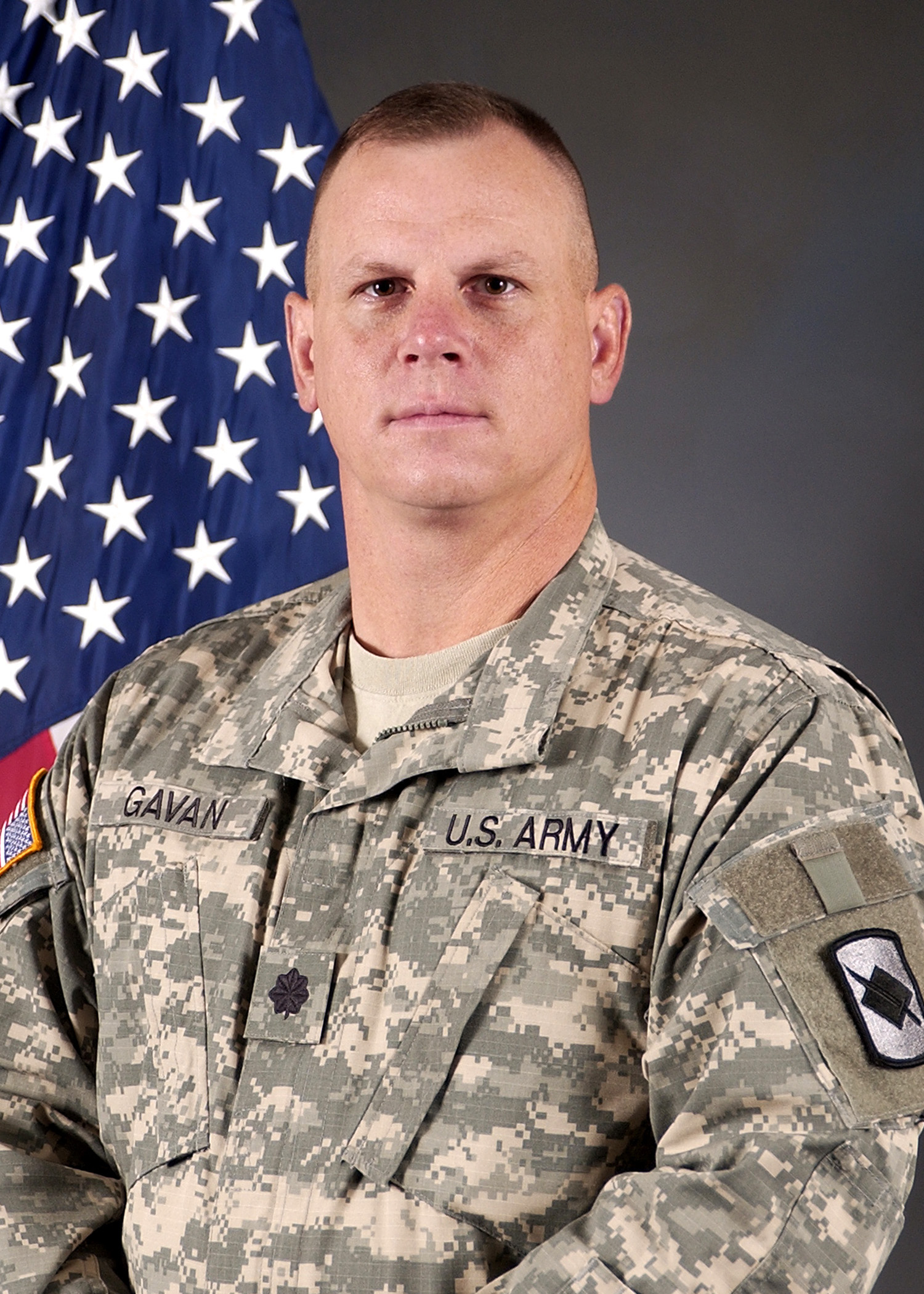
LTC Sean E. Gavan, 2010–2012

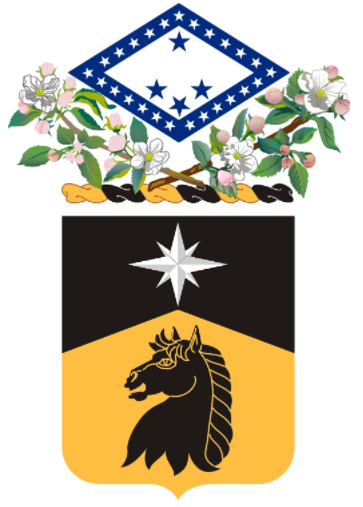
LTC Denny Rozenberg, 2012–2014

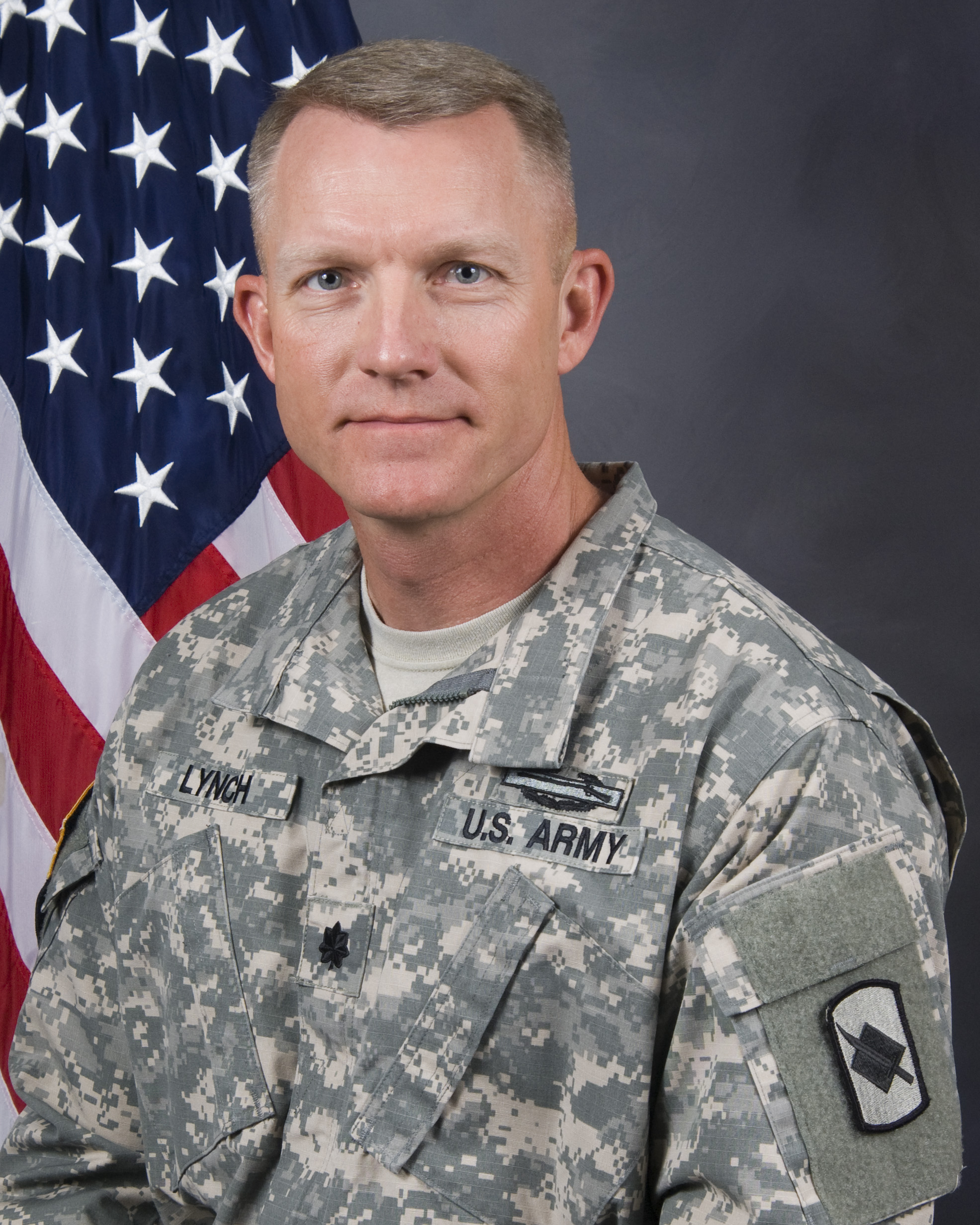
LTC Joel Lynch, 2014–2015

== 151st Cavalry fallen ==
=== OIF II ===
- Sergeant First Class William W. Labadie Jr. of Bauxite, Age 45. Killed in Action, 4/7/04
- Sergeant Fleix M. Delgreco of Simsbury, CT, Age 22. Killed in Action 4/9/04
- Specialist Robert W. Hoyt of Mansfield, CT, Age 21. Killed in Action 12/11/04

=== OIF 08-09 ===
- SFC Anthony Lynn Woodham, Age 37, of Rogers, Ark., Heber Springs, Ark., died 5 July, at Camp Adder, Tallil, Iraq, from non-combat related illness.

== Heraldic items ==
Yellow is the traditional color used by Cavalry units. The horse symbolizes the proud heritage and tradition of Cavalry. The Chevron suggests the forward motion, underscoring the unit's motto. The Polestar, adapted from the compass rose, highlights the leadership and direction while alluding to the North Star, commemorating the unit's WW II service in the Aleutians. Black and white refers to night and day and "around the clock" military capabilities. 1-151 Cavalry proudly serves as the Infantry Brigade Commander's eyes and ears on the combined arms battlefield

== Historical unit locations ==
Unit	Station
Headquarters and Headquarters Troop,	Warren, Arkansas
Detachment 1 (Fire Support), Headquarters and Headquarters Troop	Paris, Arkansas
Troop A (-)	El Dorado, Arkansas
Detachment 1, Troop A,	Crossett, Arkansas
Troop B	Magnolia, Arkansas
Troop C (-)	Camden, Arkansas

== See also ==
- List of armored and cavalry regiments of the United States Army
