= 3rd Caucasus Army Corps =

1st Cavalry Corps
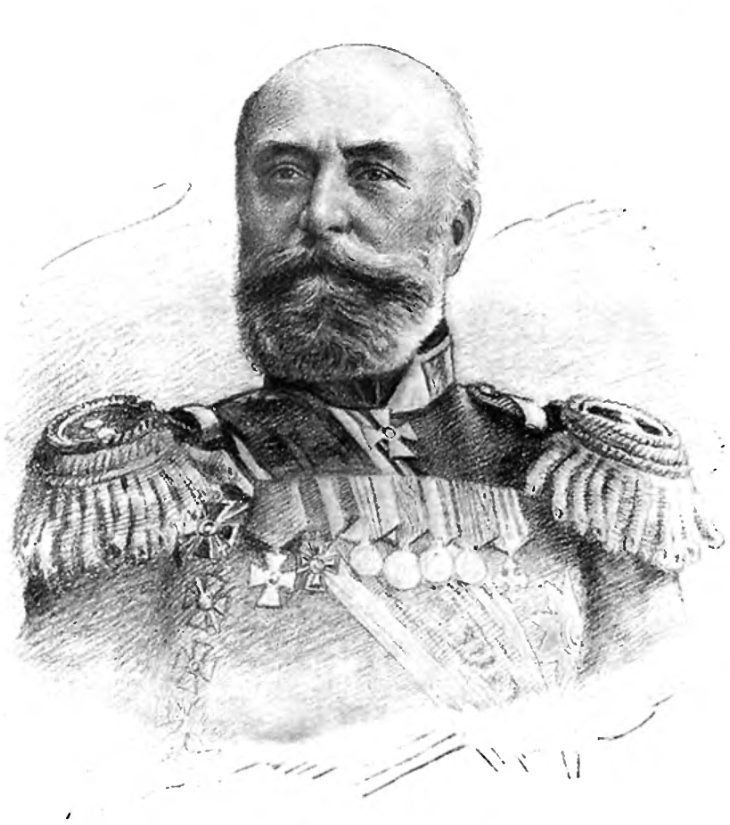
- Vladimir A. Irmanov
- Country: Russian Empire
- Allegiance: Imperial Russian Army
- Engagements: World War I

The 3rd Caucasus Army Corps (Russian, 3-й Ка́вказский арме́йский ко́рпус) was a military formation of the Russian Empire which existed from 1912 to 1918.

== Composition ==
- 21st Infantry Division
- 52nd Infantry Division
- 3rd Caucasus Cossack Division

== Part of ==
- 3rd Army: 1914
- 12th Army: 1915
- 3rd Army: 1915–1916
- 3rd Army: 1917

== Commanders ==
- gen. of artillery Vladimir A. Irmanov: 1912–1917
- lieutenant gen. M. N. Ivanov: 1917
- lieutenant gen. książę A. N. Eristov: 1917
