= 3rd Garrison Division of Lanzhou Military Region =

Independent Division of Ningxia Military District (1966-81) 3rd Garrison Division of Lanzhou Military Region (1981-85)
- Active: 1966.7 - 1985.9
- Country: People's Republic of China
- Branch: People's Liberation Army
- Type: Division
- Role: Infantry, Garrison

Independent Division of Ningxia Provincial Military District (Chinese: 宁夏省军区独立师) was formed in July 1966 from the Public Security Contingent of Ningxia province and headquartered at Yinchuan. Compared to other regions the Ningxia district commanded relatively few forces. The military district originally supported the seizure of power in the region by rebel groups following the 1967 January Storm but withdrew support under direction of the central government, resulting in a large-scale conflict. The rebellion was quelled following intervention of the 62nd Division.

The division was composed of three regiments (1st to 3rd).

In May 1969, all three regiments of the division exchanged position and designation with other units:

- 1st Infantry Regiment exchanged with 4th Independent Infantry Regiment of Qinghai Provincial Military District;
- 2nd Infantry Regiment exchanged with 5th Independent Infantry Regiment of Shannxi Provincial Military District;
- 3rd Infantry Regiment exchanged with 1st Independent Infantry Regiment of Gansu Provincial Military District.

In March 1976 1st Infantry Regiment was re-organized as Artillery Regiment; 6th Independent Infantry Regiment of Qinghai Provincial Military District was attached to the division as new 1st Infantry Regiment.

In February 1981 the division was renamed as 3rd Garrison Division of Lanzhou Military Region(Chinese: 兰州军区守备第3师).

In September 1985 the division was disbanded.
