= 3rd Division =

3rd Division may refer to:

== Air divisions ==
- 3rd Air Division, United States
- 3rd Attack Wing, United States
- 3rd Fighter Aviation Division, People's Republic of China
- 3rd Fighter Division (Germany)

== Anti-air divisions ==
- 3rd Anti-Aircraft Division, United Kingdom
- 3rd Flak Division, Nazi Germany
- 3rd Guards Anti-Aircraft Artillery Division, Soviet Union

== Armoured divisions ==
- 3rd Armoured Division (Australia)
- 3rd Armored Division (France)
- 3rd Armoured Division (France, 1940)
- 3rd Light Mechanized Division (France)
- 3rd Panzer Division (Wehrmacht)
- 3rd Panzer Division (Bundeswehr)
- 3rd SS Panzer Division Totenkopf, Nazi Germany
- 3rd Tank Division (Imperial Japanese Army)
- 3rd Armored Division (Jordan)
- 3rd Division (Nigeria)
- 3rd Guards Tank Division, Soviet Union
- 3rd Tank Division (Soviet Union)
- 3rd Armoured Division (Syria)
- 3rd Armored Division (United States)

== Cavalry divisions ==
- 3rd Cavalry Division (German Empire)
- 3rd Cavalry Division (Reichswehr), Weimar Republic
- 3rd Light Division (Wehrmacht)
- 3rd Cavalry Division Amedeo Duca d'Aosta, Italian Army during World War II
- 3rd Caucasus Cossack Division, Russian Empire
- 3rd Cavalry Division (Russian Empire)
- 3rd Cavalry Division (Soviet Union)
- 3rd Cavalry Division (United Kingdom)
- 3rd Mounted Division, United Kingdom
- 3rd Cavalry Division (United States)

== Infantry divisions ==
- 3rd (Lahore) Division, of the British Indian Army before and during World War I
- 3rd Algerian Infantry Division, France
- 3rd Alpine Division Julia, Italy
- 3rd Army Division (Argentina)
- 3rd Army Division (Peru)
- 3rd Army Division (Sweden)
- 3rd Blackshirt Division (21 April), a Black Shirt militia division of Italy
- 3rd Canadian Division
- 3rd Carpathian Rifle Division (Poland)
- 3rd Colonial Infantry Division (France)
- 3rd Division (Australia)
- 3rd Division (Colombia)
- 3rd Division (Duchy of Warsaw)
- 3rd Division (Estonia)
- 3rd Division (German Empire)
- 3rd Division (Imperial Japanese Army)
- 3rd Division (Iraq)
- 3rd Division (Japan), Japan Ground Self-Defense Force
- 3rd Division (New Zealand)
- 3rd Division (North Korea)
- 3rd Division (Norway)
- 3rd Division (1st Formation) (People's Republic of China)
- 3rd Guard Division, People's Republic of China
- 3rd Interior Guard Division, People's Republic of China
- 3rd Division (Reichswehr), Weimar Republic
- 3rd Division (Singapore)
- 3rd Division (South Sudan)
- 3rd Division (South Vietnam)
- 3rd Division (United Kingdom)
- 3rd Division (Vietnam)
- 3rd Division (Yugoslav Partisans)
- 3rd Garrison Division of Lanzhou Military Region, People's Republic of China
- 3rd Grenadier Division, Russian Empire
- 3rd Guards Division (Imperial Japanese Army)
- 3rd Guards Airborne Division, Soviet Union
- 3rd Guards Infantry Division (German Empire)
- 3rd Guards Infantry Division (Russian Empire)
- 3rd Guards Motor Rifle Division
- 3rd Indian Infantry Division, official designation for the Chindits
- 3rd Infantry Division (Belgium)
- 3rd Infantry Division (Greece)
- 3rd Infantry Division (Lithuania)
- 3rd Infantry Division (Malaysia)
- 3rd Infantry Division (Philippines)
- 3rd Infantry Division (Russian Empire)
- 3rd Infantry Division (South Africa)
- 3rd Infantry Division (South Korea)
- 3rd Infantry Division (United States)
- 3rd Infantry Division (Wehrmacht), subsequently redesignated the 3rd Motorized Infantry Division, then the 3rd Panzergrenadier Division
- 3rd Infantry Division "Ravenna", Italy
- 3rd Lahore Divisional Area, of the British Indian Army during World War I
- 3rd Landwehr Division, German Empire
- 3rd Legions Infantry Division (Poland)
- 3rd Luftwaffe Field Division
- 3rd Marine Infantry Division "San Marco", Italy
- 3rd Marine Division (United States)
- 3rd Marine Division (Wehrmacht)
- 3rd Moscow Communist Rifle Division
- 3rd Motor Rifle Division, Soviet Union
- 3rd Mountain Division, Germany
- 3rd North African Infantry Division, France
- 3rd Parachute Division, Germany
- 3rd Reserve Division (German Empire)
- 3rd Reserve Division (People's Republic of China)
- 3rd Rifle Division (Soviet Union)
- 3rd Royal Bavarian Division, German Empire
- 3rd Siberian Rifle Division, Russian Empire
- 3rd Special Forces Division (Greece)
- 3rd Taman Rifle Division
- Finnish 3rd Division (Continuation War)
- Finnish 3rd Division (Winter War)
- Kostrad 3rd Infantry Division, Indonesia

== Other units ==
- 3rd and 4th Divisions, Royal Navy
- 3rd Carrier Division, Imperial Japanese Navy
- 3rd Armored Division Artillery, United States
- 3rd Infantry Division Artillery, United States
- Butterfield Overland Mail 3rd Division
- Carrier Division 3, U.S. Navy

== See also ==
- Third Division (disambiguation)
- Third Army (disambiguation)
- III Corps (disambiguation)
- 3rd Brigade (disambiguation)
- 3rd Regiment (disambiguation)
- 3rd Battalion (disambiguation)
- 3 Squadron (disambiguation)
