= 52nd Infantry Division (Russian Empire) =

- 52-я пехотная дивизия
- Active: 1914–1918
- Country: Russian Empire
- Branch: Russian Imperial Army
- Role: Infantry

The 52nd Infantry Division (Russian: 52-я пехотная дивизия, 52-ya Pekhotnaya Diviziya) was an infantry formation of the Russian Imperial Army.

== Organization ==
- 1st Brigade
  - 205th Infantry Regiment
  - 206th Infantry Regiment
- 2nd Brigade
  - 207th Infantry Regiment
  - 208th Infantry Regiment
- 52nd Artillery Brigade
