= 3rd Caucasus Cossack Division =

- Active: 1910–1918
- Allegiance: Russian Empire
- Branch: Imperial Russian Army

The 3rd Caucasus Cossack Division (Russian: 3-я Кавказская казачья дивизия) was a cavalry division of the Imperial Russian Army during World War I. It was part of the 3rd Caucasus Army Corps.

== Organization ==
- 1st Brigade
- 2nd Brigade

== Commanders ==
- 1910–1917: Pavel Helmickij
- 1917: Sergei Ivanovich Odintsov

== Chiefs of Staff ==
- 1910–1912: Aseev, Mikhail Vasil'evich
- 1912–1915: Sergei Ivanovich Odintsov
- Kosyakov, Victor Antonovich
- 1915–1917: Lazarev, Boris Petrovich

== Commanders of the 1st Brigade ==
- 1910–1914: Fisenko, Nikolay Ivanovich
- 1915: Marganija, Malahij Kvadzhievich
- 1916: Safarbek Malsagov

== Commanders of the 2nd Brigade ==
- 1913–1916: Fyodor Petrovich Filimonov
