= 3rd/5th Battalion Lancashire Fusiliers =

The 3rd/5th Battalion Lancashire Fusiliers was a unit of the British Army.

== History ==
The 3rd/5th Battalion of the Lancashire Fusiliers was a Territorial Force unit formed at Bury on 11 October 1914 as a home depot (third line) unit. It was converted into a second line unit by May 1915 and attached to 197th Brigade, 66th (2nd East Lancashire) Division. It moved to Crowborough in May 1915 and on to Tunbridge Wells in October 1915. It later moved to Colchester in March 1916. The Battalion was posted to the Western Front, landing in at Le Havre on 1 March 1917. It was disbanded in February 1918 and its men distributed to other units.
