= 3rd Littoral Logistics Battalion =

3d Littoral Logistics Battalion
- Active: 16 Sept 1942 – 24 Dec 1945 5 March 1952 – 1 May 1958 1 July 1964 – 27 June 2008 27 June 2008 – 12 September 2023 12 September 2023 - Present
- Country: United States
- Branch: USMC
- Type: Logistics
- Part of: 3rd Marine Littoral Regiment; 3rd Marine Division
- Garrison/HQ: Marine Corps Base Hawaii
- Nickname: "Longboard"
- Mottos: 'O Ka Hana, 'A'Ole Ka 'Òlelo (Actions, Not Words)
- Engagements: World War II * Battle of Guam * Battle of Iwo Jima; Vietnam War; Operation Desert Storm; Operation Enduring Freedom

Commanders
- Current commander: LtCol Hoyt
- Sergeant Major: SgtMaj Davila-Fonseca

Insignia
- Call sign: Longboard

3d Littoral Logistics Battalion (3d LLB) is a logistics battalion in the United States Marine Corps. It is headquartered at Marine Corps Base Hawaii and falls under the command of 3rd Marine Littoral Regiment and the 3rd Marine Division (3d MarDiv).

== Subordinate units ==
- Headquarters & Service Company (H&S Co.)
- Littoral Logistics Company A (LLC A)
- Littoral Logistics Company B (LLC B)
- General Support Company (GS Co)

== Mission ==
The Littoral Logistics Battalion provides tactical logistics and EOD support in order to sustain regimental operations across the competition continuum.

== History ==
Combat Logistics Battalion 3 (CLB-3) was activated on 27 June 2008 from the previous Combat Service Support Group 3 (CSSG-3) on Marine Corps Base Hawaii in Kaneohe, Hawaii. Immediately following the activation, the battalion simultaneously deployed to the big island of Hawaii in direct support of 3rd Marine Regiment, aboard the USS Bonhomme Richard, and to Pearl Harbor to conduct security operations in support of nuclear submarine operations.

On 1 November 2008, just 121 days old and the youngest battalion in the United States Marine Corps, CLB-3 was designated the Logistics Combat Element (LCE) of the Special Purpose Marine Air-Ground Task Force – Afghanistan and deployed to Camp Bastion, a military base run by the United Kingdom in Southern Afghanistan. From November 2008 to May 2009, the battalion conducted combat operations in Southern Afghanistan providing all six functions of logistics: transportation, engineering, maintenance, supply, health services, and services to all Marine and NATO forces in Southern Afghanistan.

On 8 December 2021, CLB-3 responded to the Red Hill Water Crisis aboard Joint Base Pearl Harbor-Hickam where it provided shower and laundry services to affected families and set up no less than seven water distribution points throughout the base and surrounding military communities. As part of Task Force Kuleana, the battalion distributed more than one million gallons of water from 8 December 2021 to 12 March 2022.

As part of Force Design 2030 reorganization, CLB-3 realigned under 3d Marine Littoral Regiment in June 2023 and was redesignated as 3d Littoral Logistics Battalion (3d LLB) on 12 September 2023. This redesignation created a 'first of its kind' battalion in the Marine Corps.

== See also ==
- List of United States Marine Corps battalions
- Organization of the United States Marine Corps
