= 3rd Interior Guard Division =

12th Division (1949–50) 20th Public Security Division (1950-55) 3rd Interior Guard Division (1955-57) 3rd Public Security Interior Guard Division (1957-59)
- Active: 1949.2 - 1959.1
- Country: People's Republic of China
- Branch: People's Liberation Army
- Type: Division
- Role: Infantry, Security
- Engagements: Chinese Civil War

The 12th Division(Chinese: 第12师) was created in February 1949 under the Regulation of the Redesignations of All Organizations and Units of the Army, issued by Central Military Commission on November 1, 1948, basing on 3rd Security Brigade, 4th Column of Northwestern Field Army. Its origin could be trace to 4th Security Brigade of Shanganning-Jinsui Coalition Military Region formed in May 1948.

The division was a part of PLA 4th Corps, under the flag of 12th Division it took part in the Chinese Civil War, mainly with security missions. The division was composed of 34th, 35th and 36th Infantry Regiments.

In December 1950, the division was transferred to Railway Public Security Force's control and reorganized as 20th Public Security Division(Chinese: 公安第20师). The division was then composed of:

- 58th Public Security Regiment (former 34th Infantry);
- 59th Public Security Regiment (former 35th Infantry);
- 60th Public Security Regiment (former 36th Infantry).

From February 1951 the division stationed in Zhengzhou, Henan.

In January 1955, following the inactivation of Railway Public Security Force Command, the division was put under direct control by Public Security Force Command and renamed as 3rd Interior Guard Division(Chinese: 内卫第3师) of the People's Liberation Army Public Security Force. The division was then composed of:

- 8th Interior Guard Regiment;
- 9th Interior Guard Regiment;
- 10th Interior Guard Regiment;
- 11th Interior Guard Regiment.

In January 1957, following the dissolution of the Public Security Force and the creation of Public Security Troops, the division was renamed as 3rd Public Security Interior Guard Division(Chinese: 公安内卫第3师). All its regiments maintained.

In September 1957 the division was transferred to Security Department of General Staff Department's control.

In December 1958 the division was demobilized and transferred to local public security branches. In January 1959 the division was formally inactivated.
