= 3rd Battalion, 153rd Infantry Regiment =

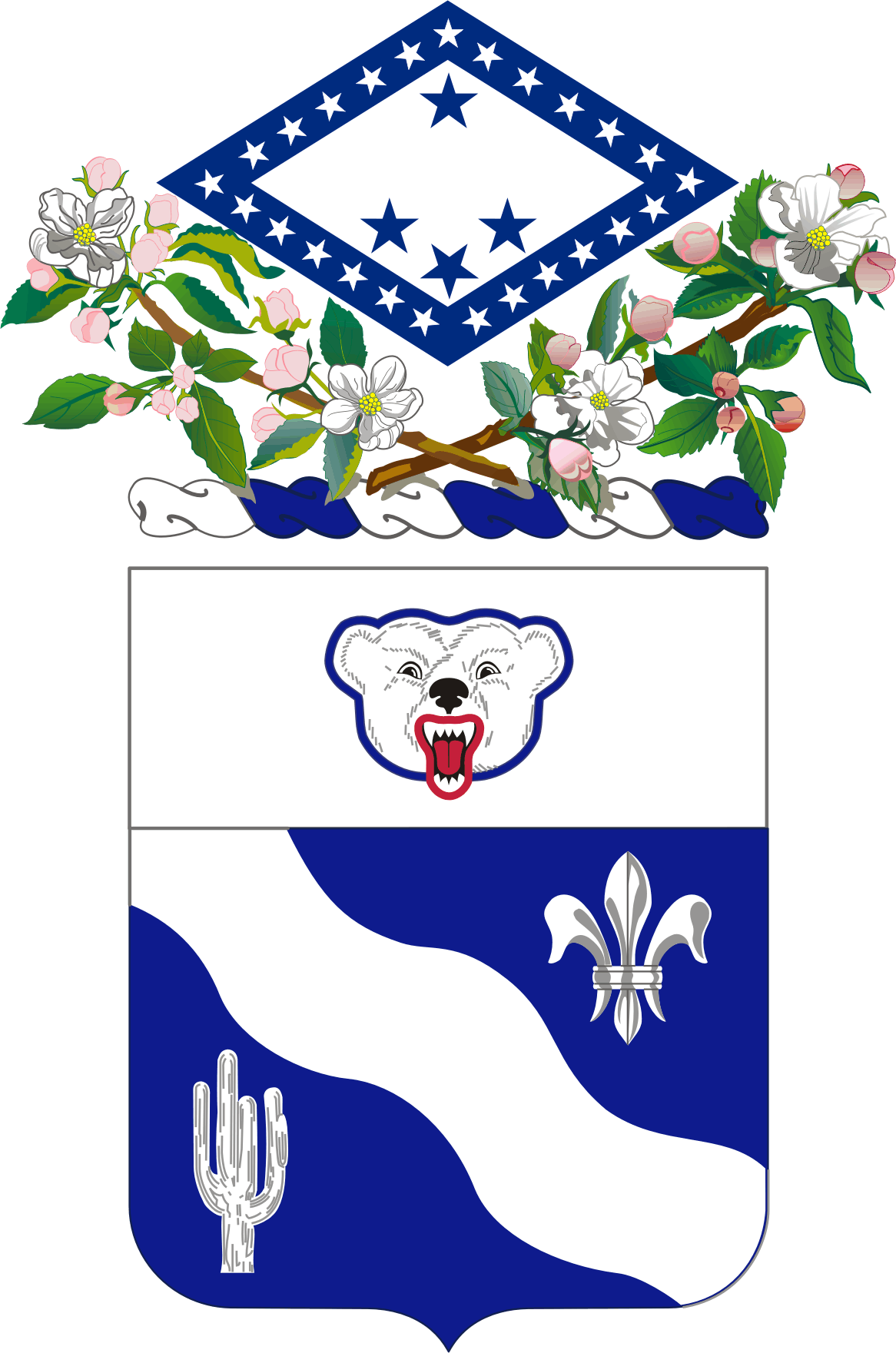
- 153rd Infantry coat of arms
- Active: 1917–2005
- Country: United States
- Branch: United States Army
- Type: Infantry
- Role: Light Infantry
- Size: Battalion
- Garrison/HQ: Warren, Arkansas
- Engagements: World War I World War II; *Aleutian Islands; Iraq Campaign; *Transition of Iraq; *Iraqi Governance

Insignia
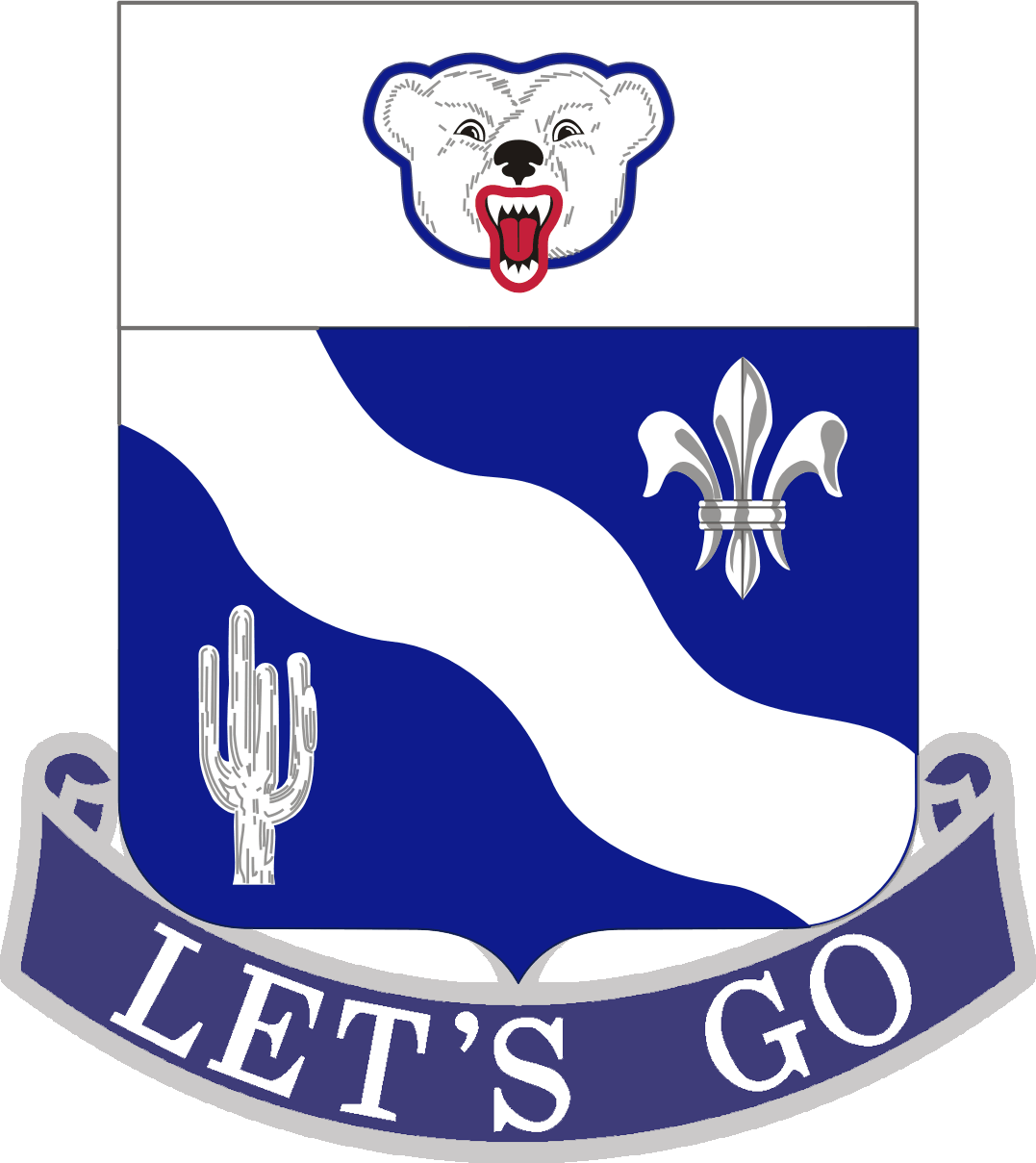
- Distinctive Unit Insignia

- 39th Infantry Brigade Combat Team shoulder sleeve insignia

3rd Battalion, 153rd Infantry Regiment (United States) was a United States infantry battalion, headquartered at Warren, Arkansas, assigned to the 39th Infantry Brigade Combat Team of the Arkansas Army National Guard until it was deactivated on 5 September 2005. The history of the 3rd Battalion, 153rd Infantry as an individual battalion begins with the reorganization of the 39th Infantry Division in 1967 and the creation of the 39th Infantry Brigade (Separate). For history of the 3rd Battalion prior to 1967, see 153rd Infantry Regiment (United States) and 39th Infantry Division (United States).

3–153rd deployed soldiers to Bosnia in support of the Multi-National Security Forces (SFOR 9) and to Saudi Arabia in support of Operation Southern Watch. The 3–153rd deployed as a battalion under the 39th Infantry Brigade in support of Operation Iraqi Freedom from 2004–2005. Company C, 3–153rd was award the Valorous Unit Award for the period 25 March 2004 – 20 January 2005 while serving with the battalion in the Adhamiyah neighborhood of Baghdad.

The 3rd Battalion was deactivated on 5 September 2005 when the 39th Infantry Brigade (Separate) was reorganized under the modular brigade combat team concept. The units of the 3–153rd were reorganized as the 1st Squadron, 151st Cavalry Regiment.

== Creation of the 39th Infantry Brigade ==
In 1967, the 39th Infantry Division was reorganized and redesignated as the 39th Infantry Brigade (Separate). In 1973 the 39th Infantry Brigade was paired with the US 101st Airborne Division as a training partner and became an air-assault brigade.

In 1994 the 39th was again reorganized and gained its designation as an "enhanced" brigade.

In 1999, the 39th became part of the 7th Infantry Division under the Army Integrated Division concept which paired National Guard and Reserve brigades with active duty headquarters and support units.

== Overseas training ==
The 3rd Battalion, 153rd Infantry conducted an overseas training in 1990. Company C, 3–153rd conducted Annual Training in Honduras as part of the National Guard Bureau's Overseas Training Program.

== Operation Southern Watch ==
Company B, 3rd Battalion, 153rd Infantry of the 39th BCT was activated for Operation Southern Watch in May through September 1999. Company B, 3-153 deployed to Prince Sultan Air Base, Saudi Arabia. 39th Brigade Soldiers provided security at Patriot Missile Batteries during these deployments. The mission lasted a total of four months, and was the first "pure" National Guard effort in the region.

== Security Force Nine (SFOR 9) ==
In March 2001, Company D, 1–153rd and Company D, 3–153rd deployed to Bosnia as part of the Multinational Stabilization Force (SFOR), Security Force Nine in order to assist with the enforcement of the mandate of the United Nations Mission in Bosnia and Herzegovina (UNMIBH). The companies were attached to 3rd Squadron, 7th Cavalry Regiment, 3rd Infantry Division for the deployment as part of Task Force Eagle. They performed presence patrols outside Forward Operating Base Morgan and Camp McGovern, and participated in the consolidation of weapon storage sites. The soldiers also guarded the sites.

== Operation Iraqi Freedom II ==
=== Ramp-up ===
In 2002 the 39th Brigade was notified that it would be participating in a rotation to the Joint Readiness Training Center (JRTC) at Fort Polk, LA. For National Guard brigades, a rotation is actually a three-year process that provides additional money, resources and training opportunities in order to improve unit readiness before the actual rotation through the JRTC. The brigade was required to complete a Mission Rehearsal Exercise during the Annual Training 2003 which was conducted at Fort Chaffee, Arkansas. Less than a month after the completion of this major training milestone, the brigade received its alert for deployment to Iraq in support of Operation Iraqi Freedom on 28 July 2003.

=== Alert, train, and man the battalion ===
On 12 October 2003, the 3rd Battalion, 153rd Infantry Regiment, commanded by LTC Mark Lumpkin, was ordered to federal service in support of Operation Iraqi Freedom II for a period of up to 18 months. The 3–153rd IN would undergo post mobilization training at Fort Hood, Texas from October 2003 until January 2004. In January the 3–153rd shipped its vehicles and equipment to Iraq from Fort Hood, and then moved to Fort Polk for a Mission Rehearsal Exercise at the JRTC. While there, on 17 February 2004, President George W. Bush visited the 39th and had an MRE (Meal, Ready-to-Eat) lunch in a field mess tent with soldiers. After lunch, President Bush made brief remarks to the soldiers.

When the 3–153rd IN received its alert, it was approximately 130 soldiers short of its authorized end strength. This shortage was due in large part to the way new recruits are accounted for in the National Guard. In the active army a new recruit only comes to a unit and is counted on its books after the soldier has completed Basic Combat Training and Advanced Individual Training. In the National Guard, the new recruit is counted on the unit's strength reports as soon as the soldier signs his contract. The brigade had over 500 soldiers who had not completed either Basic or Advanced Individual Training upon alert.

This shortage led to the decision to consolidate the available manning into two infantry battalions that would be supplied for the brigade by the Arkansas National Guard and to ask National Guard Bureau to provide the third infantry battalion. Because of the 2002 deployment of the 2-153 Infantry Battalion to the MFO, the battalion was deemed non-deployable as an organization, however the soldiers of the battalion were to deploy. The decision was made by BG Chastain to consolidate the three infantry battalions into two battalions and request an additional battalion from National Guard Bureau. The 3rd Battalion, 153rd Infantry Regiment was one of the two Arkansas infantry battalions which would deploy. The battalion commander (LTC Kirk Van Pelt) and staff from 2–153rd IN were transferred to 3–153rd IN Infantry. The 3–153rd IN battalion commander and staff were transferred to 2–153rd IN and were designated to function as the brigade's rear detachment during the deployment. This transfer led to the 3-153 IN often being referred to as the Two-Thirds (2/3) Battalion by members of the 39th BCT. 3–153rd IN adopted the 2–153rd IN's nickname and call sign, "Gunslingers" for OIF II.

=== Consolidation for deployment ===
During consolidation of the 1st, 2nd and 3rd Battalions 153rd Infantry for OIF II, efforts were made to maintain unit integrity at least at the platoon level. The units were consolidated in the following fashion:

Battalion Headquarters	OIF II Deployed Unit	Consolidated Units
3rd Battalion, 153rd Infantry	HHC, 3–153rd	HHC, 2–153rd
	Company A, 3–153rd	Company A and a Plt from C/3-153rd
	Company B, 3–153rd	Company B, 2–153rd
	Company C, 3–153rd	Company A, 2–153rd, and a plt from C/2-153
	Company D, 3–153rd	Company D, 2–153rd and a Plt from D/3-153rd
1st Battalion, 153rd Infantry	HHC, 1–153rd	HHC, 1–153rd
	Company A 1–153rd	Company A and 2 Plts from B/1-153rd
	Company B, 1–153rd	Company B, 3–153rd and a Plt from D/3-153rd
	Company C, 1–153rd	Company C, 1–153rd
	Company D, 1–153rd	Company D, 1–153rd and 1 Plt from D/3-153rd

=== Operation Bowie Fury ===
==== Mission statement ====
3–153rd conducts combat missions and stability operations and support operations (SOSO) in order to set the conditions for a safe and secure Baghdad and greater Iraq.

==== Area of operations ====
The 3rd Battalion, 153rd Infantry Regiment relieved the 2nd Battalion, 3rd Field Artillery and 3rd Battalion, 7th Armor, of 1st Brigade, 1st Armored Division in the Baghdad neighborhood of Adhamiyah. This relief in place took place in the midst of a multiparty insurgency uprising. The brigade's convoys were heavily opposed during the convoy north. 3–153rd was stationed at Forward Operating Base (FOB) Gunslinger (aka FOB Solidarity), in the Adhamiyah neighborhood of Baghdad which lies immediately to the west of Sadr City. Soldiers of Company C, 3-153rd were stationed at Patrol Base Apache (also known as Fort Apache) the former Adhamiyah Palace, which was prominently displayed in the 2004 documentary film Gunner Palace. Additionally 3-153rd was charged with patrolling a large area of operations that stretched north from Baghdad along the east side of the Tigris River, and included the city of Hussainiyah, a town of 500,000 about twelve miles north of Baghdad. 3–153rd was tasked with providing a Military Assistance Training Team to support the Headquarters and Companies C and D of 301st Iraqi National Guard Battalion, and Company C, 102nd Iraqi National Guard Battalion.

==== Significant combat actions ====
3–153rd was responsible for the development of various tactics, techniques and procedures related to sniper operations. On 9 June 2004, 3rd Battalion snipers engaged and destroyed an enemy 60mm mortar team attempting to attack elements of the 1st Squadron, 5th Cavalry Regiment on the FOB Justice (the former Iraqi Ministry of Justice). This engagement was the first successful sniper engagement against an enemy mortar in Task Force Baghdad. On 29 August 2004, and 13 January 2005, battalion snipers engaged and destroyed enemy 82mm mortar teams. Battalion snipers also destroyed two enemy Rocket Propelled Grenade (RPG) teams, one enemy machine gun team and various other small unit formations. In all the 3rd Battalion snipers accumulated over 3,000 hours in observation and hide sites in the battalion's area of observation.

The battalion conducted over twenty battalion level operations ranging from cordon and search operation, raid, and movement to contact. These operations resulted in the capture of two-hundred enemy personnel and the destruction of over one hundred and twenty enemy fighters. The battalion's subordinate companies conducted over two hundred fifty company level operations and conducted over one thousand five hundred patrols. The 3rd Battalion also confiscated thousands of pounds of enemy arms, ammunition and equipment.

While detached to the 2nd Squadron 7th Cavalry Regiment, members of the 1st Platoon, Company C, 3–153rd conducted combat operations throughout the Task Force Baghdad (MND-B) area of operations, including the Battle of Najaf (2004). On 10 and 16 July 2004, 1st platoon confiscated one of the largest caches discovered in the 2–7th CAV area of operations. During the Battle of Najaf, 1st platoon acted as the company main effort for Company C, 2nd Squadron, 7th Cavalry through three weeks of offensive operations, the platoon killed over one hundred twenty enemy insurgents with the loss of only two wounded in action. The platoon spearheaded 2–7th CAV's final assault on the objective. The platoon was the first coalition element to enter the Exclusion Zone surrounding the Imam Ali Mosque.

3–153rd provided security to two massive Shiite marches to the Khadamiyah Shrine which were staged through Sunni neighborhoods. They were accompanied by very little violence due to the battalion's work with Iraqi National Guard and Iraqi Police officials.

The most coordinated enemy attack the 3–153rd experienced occurred on 20 November 2004 when twenty-six soldiers of Company C, 3-153rd were ambushed near Ft. Apache in North Baghdad. They fended off over 100 insurgents for several hours without ammunition resupply or support. The platoon leader, First Lieutenant Michael McCarty, despite being wounded, endured intense enemy direct fire and personally neutralized an enemy machine gun emplacement without support. Lieutenant McCartyreceived the Silver Star for his actions.

3-153rd was also instrumental in the January 2005 elections. The battalion was responsible for the establishment and security of twenty different polling sites within the battalion area of operations. Due to the battalion's planning and coordination with Iraqi counterpart units and governmental elections officials, not one polling site in the 3–153rd area of operations was disrupted or forced to close.

==== Media coverage ====
The 3–153rd was covered by an embedded reporter, Amy Schlesing of the Arkansas Democrat Gazette, for the entire time in Iraq. Ms. Schlesing spent the majority of her time with 3–153rd. The definitive work on the 3–153rd deployment to Iraq was published by the Arkansas Democrat Gazette. The work entitled The Bowie Brigade, Arkansas National Guard's 39th Infantry Brigade in Iraq was published in 2005 and is a collection of the work of Ms. Schlesing and the embedded photographers and writers who accompanied the brigade; Statnon Breidenthal. Karen E. Segrave, Arron Skinner, Stephen B. Thorton and Michael Woods.

==== Redeployment ====
The 3–153rd IN was relieved in place by elements of the 11th ACR in March 2005. During the deployment the battalion suffered a total of four killed in action. Members of the 3–153rd were awarded one Silver Star Medal, dozens of Bronze Stars and Army Commendation Medal with V device and many Purple Heart medals. In the March 2005, units of the 3–153rd started their rotation back to Fort Sill, Oklahoma for demobilization.

==== Order of Battle OIF II ====
The following units were task organized under the 3–153rd during Operation Iraqi Freedom II:

Battalion	Company	Source
3rd Battalion, 153 Infantry Regiment	HHC, 3-153 IN	Arkansas National Guard
	Company A, 3–153 IN	Arkansas National Guard
	Company C, 3-153 IN	Arkansas National Guard
	Company D, 3-153 IN	Arkansas National Guard
	Troop E, 151 Cavalry Regiment	Arkansas National Guard
	Elements of Company C, 1st Battalion, 102nd Infantry Regiment	Connecticut National Guard

== Deactivation ==
Upon redeployment in 2005, the 39th Brigade immediately began a major reorganization that transformed the brigade from an Enhanced Separate Brigade (eSB) to an Infantry Brigade Combat Team (IBCT) under the United States Army's new Modular Design. This redesign of the army was intended to make the force more easily deployable by making brigades more self-contained and less dependent on support organizations at the division level. The result of this reorganization of 39th IBCT was the Deactivation of 3rd Battalion, 153 Infantry Regiment and Troop E, 151 Cavalry Regiment and the reorganization of the 3–153rd IN units into the 1st Squadron, 151st Cavalry Regiment, with headquarters at Warren, Arkansas. The new 1–151st CAV is supported by Company D (Forward Support), 39th BSB.

== Operation Katrina ==
After Hurricane Katrina hit Louisiana in August 2005, elements of the 3rd Battalion, 153rd Infantry were deployed to New Orleans by C-130s from the Little Rock Air Force Base to support the relief and recovery efforts there. Under tactical control of the Louisiana National Guard, 3rd Battalion soldiers were given the mission of providing security and food and water to an estimated 20,000 people at the New Orleans Convention Center on 2 September. By the afternoon of 3 September, all individuals staying in and around the Convention Center had been evacuated. Members of the 3rd Battalion and the 39th IBCT stayed deployed in Louisiana until February 2006. Operation Katrina was the final operation for 3–153rd Infantry. By the time the battalion headquarters redeployed to Arkansas after being relieved by 1–153rd IN in October, the 3rd Battalion had already officially ceased to exist.

== Fallen soldiers ==
=== Operation Iraqi Freedom 2004–05 ===
- Specialist Kenneth Melton of Batesville, Age 30. Killed in Action, 25 April 2004
- Corporal Jimmy Buie of Floral, Age 43. Killed in Action, 1/04/05
- Specialist Joshua Marcum of Evening Shade, Age 33. Killed in Action, 1/04/05
- Specialist Jeremy McHalffey of Mabelvale, Age 28. Killed in Action, 1/04/05

== Unit awards ==
In May 2007, Company C, (Mena) 1st Battalion, 153rd Infantry was awarded a Valorous Unit Award (VUA) for the period of 24 March 2004 through 20 January 2005.

== Previous commanders ==
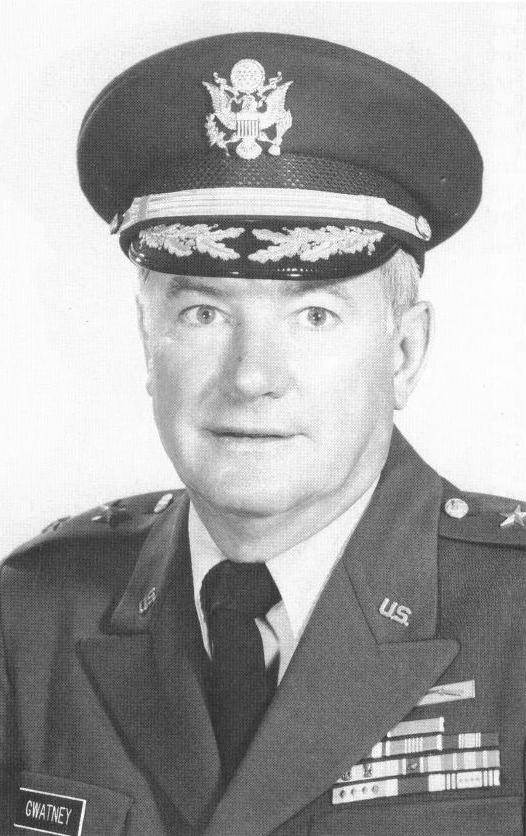
LTC Harold L. Gawtney, 1967–1969

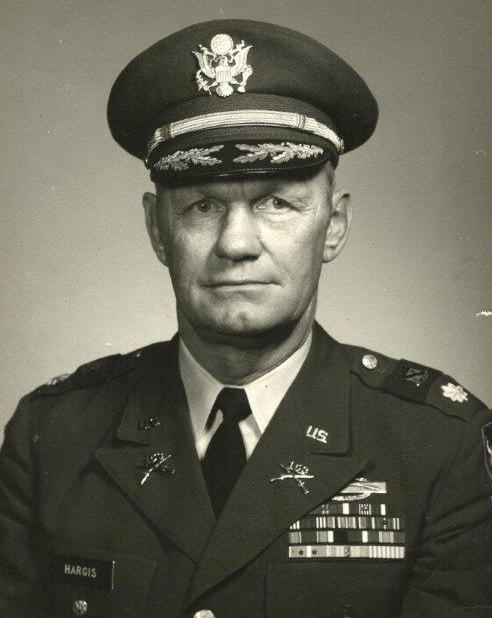
LTC Bernie S. Hargis, Jr., 1969–1971

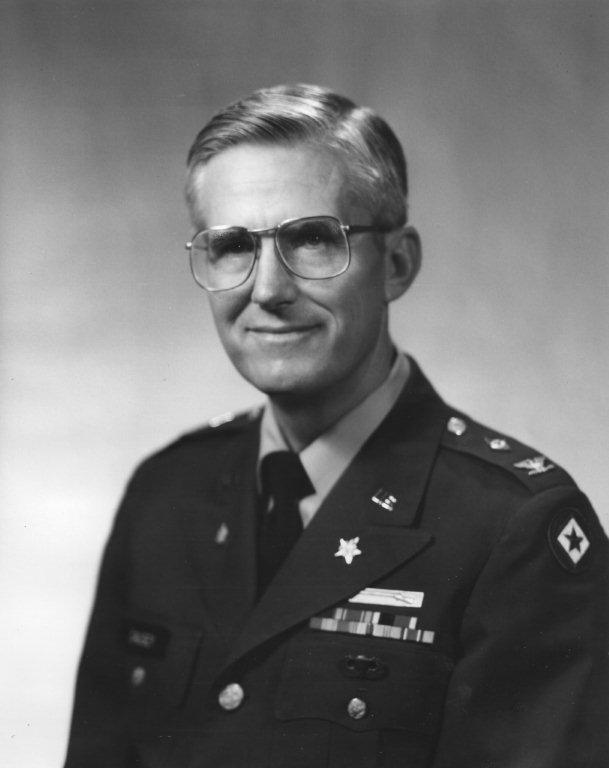
LTC James C. Causey, 1971–1974

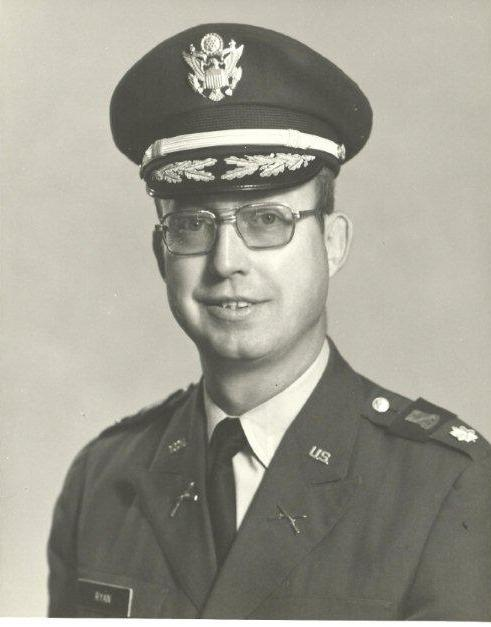
LTC James A. Ryan, 1974–1976

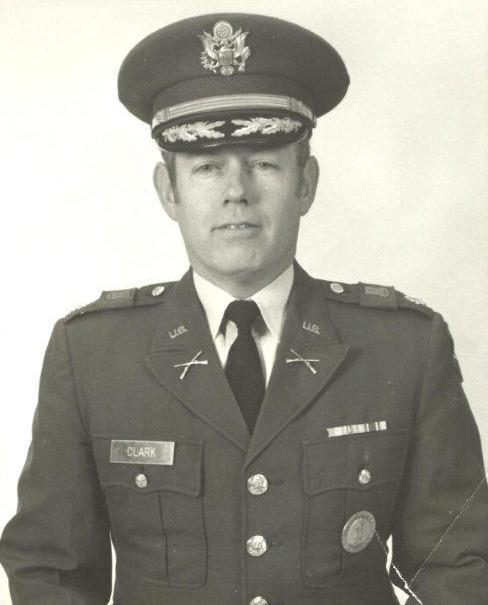
LTC William R. Clark, 1976-1978

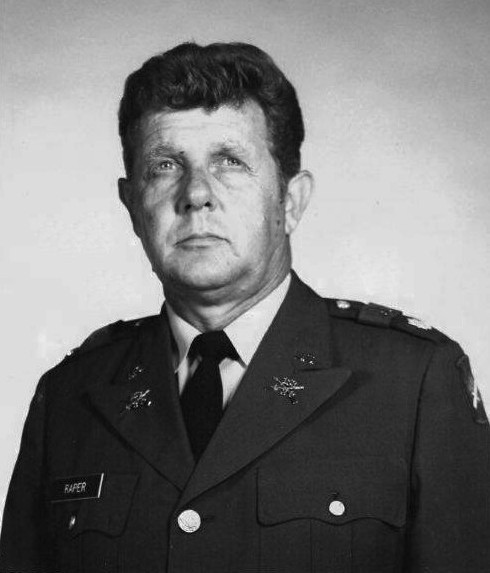
LTC James M. Raper, 1978–1981

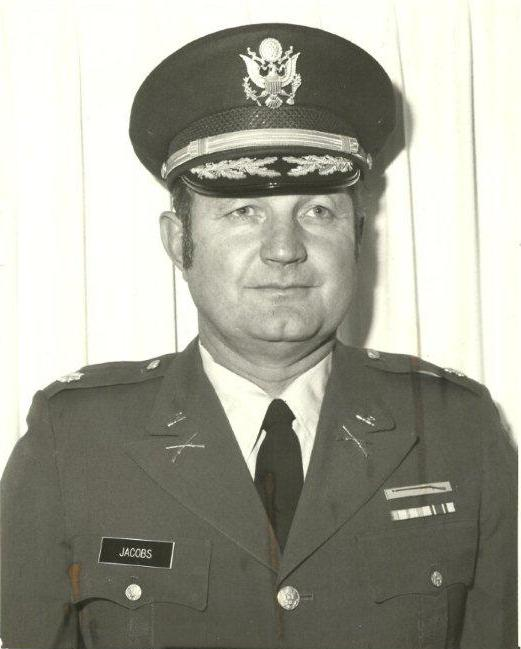
LTC Wesley V. Jacobs, 1981–1985

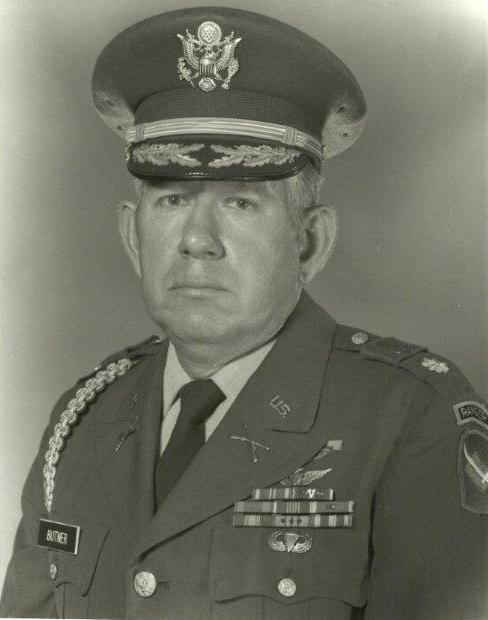
LTC Henry C. Butner, 1985–1986

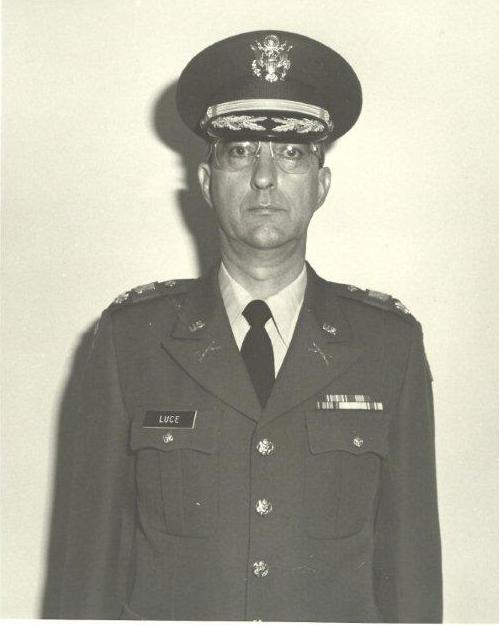
LTC William C. Luce, 1986–1988,

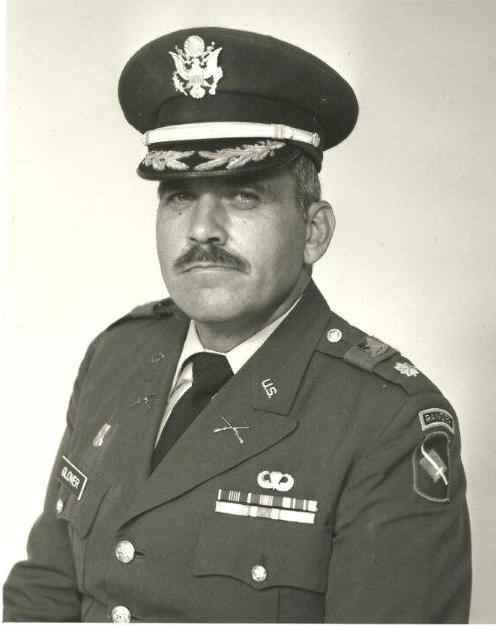
LTC Marion M. Glover, 1988–1990

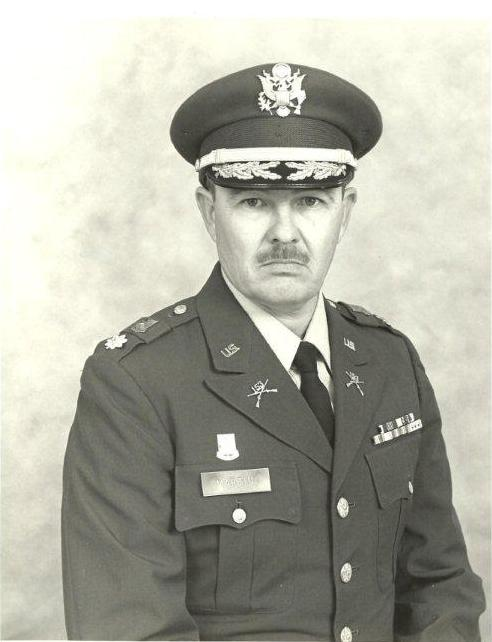
LTC Roy T. Martin, 1990–1992

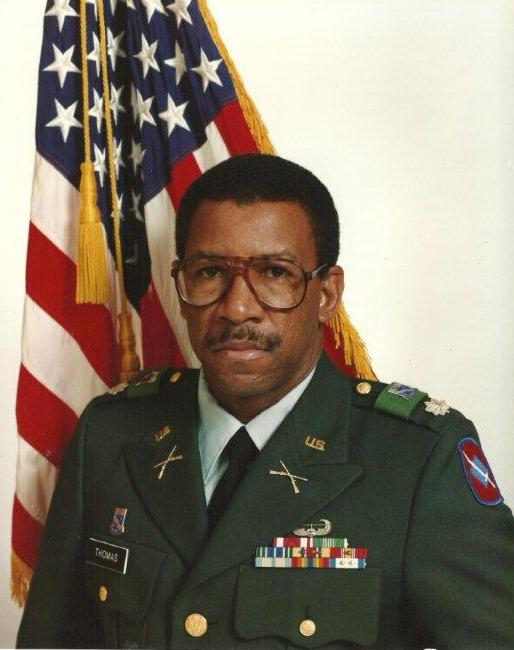
LTC Burthel Thomas, 1992–1994

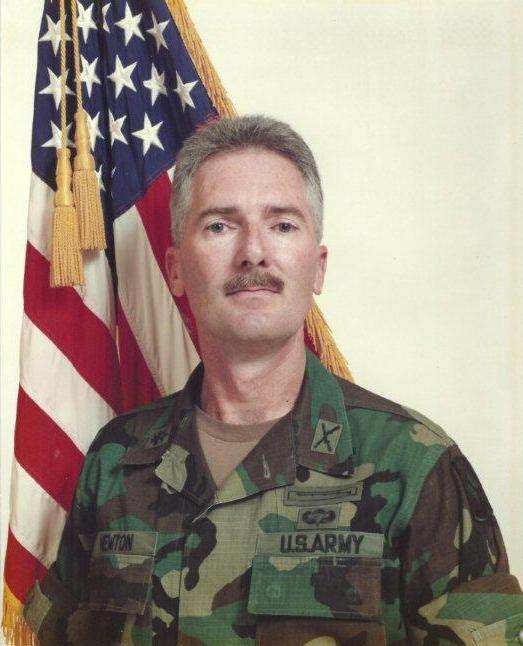
LTC Kenneth H. "Fig" Newton, 1994–1996

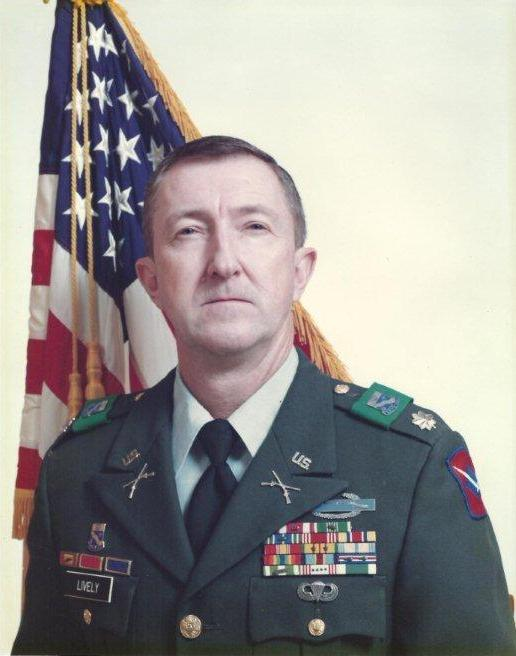
LTC David A. Lively, 1996–1998

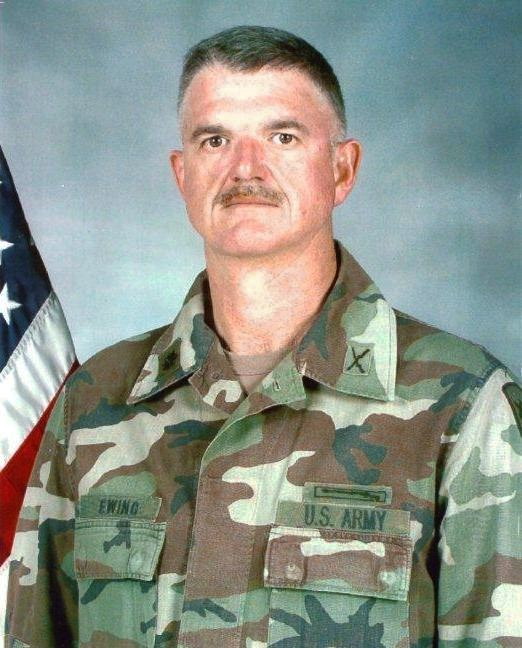
LTC Patrick Ewing, 1998–2000

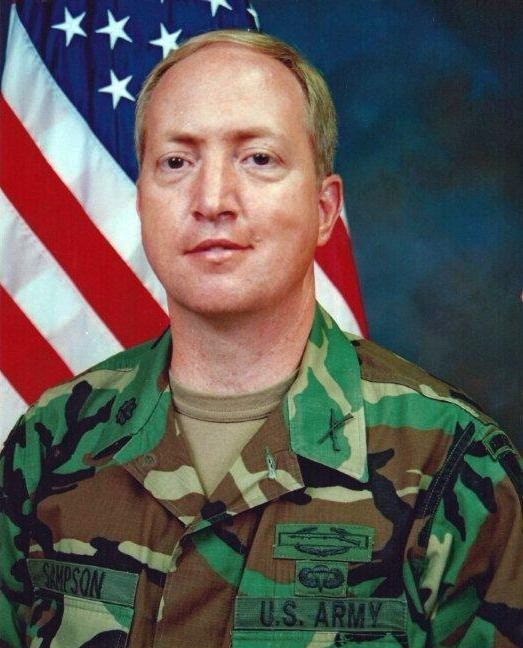
LTC Ray Sampson, 2000–2002

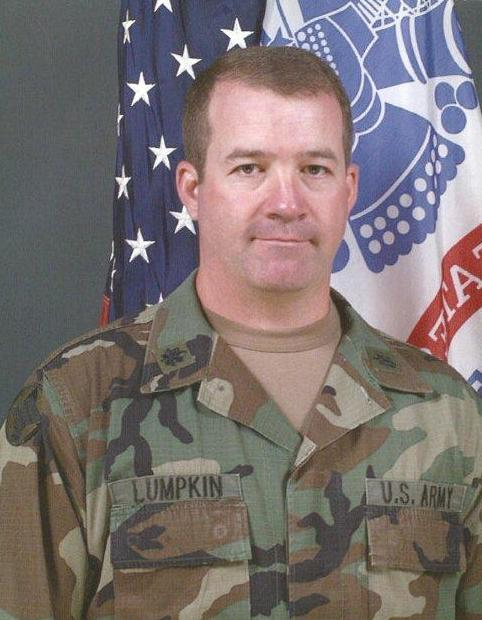
LTC Mark A. Lumpkin, 2002–2003,

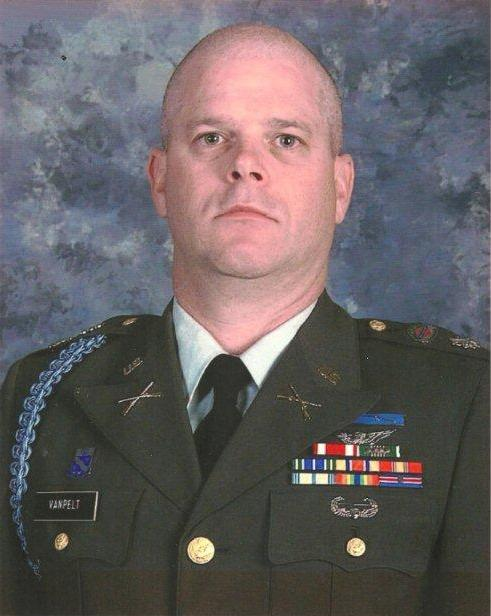
LTC Kirk E. Van Pelt, 2003–2005

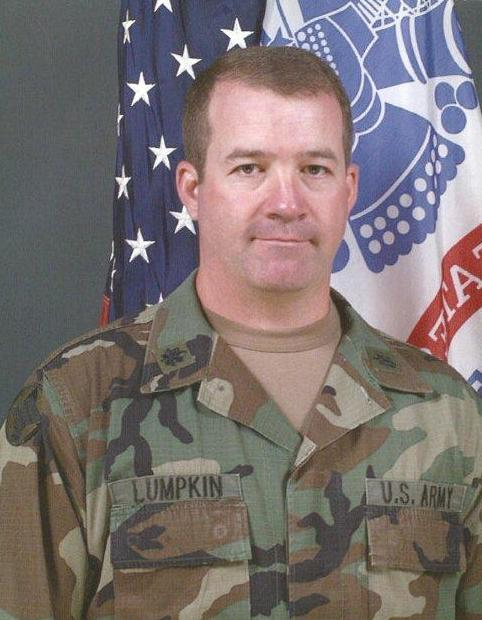
2005

== 153rd Infantry heraldry ==
=== Distinctive unit insignia ===
A silver color metal and enamel device 1 1/8 inches (2.9 cm) in height overall consisting of a shield blazoned: Azure, a bend wavy between a fleur-de-lis and a giant cactus Argent; on a chief of the last a Great Bear's face of the like fimbriated of the first, lips and tongue Gules. Attached below the shield is a blue motto scroll inscribed "LET'S GO" in silver letters.

Symbolism: The shield is blue for Infantry. The wavy bend, representing the Arkansas River, refers to the geographic location of the regiment. The cactus symbolizes service on the Mexican border and the fleur-de-lis service in France during World War I. The Great Bear's face from the shoulder sleeve insignia of the Alaskan Department symbolizes service in that area in World War II.

Background: The distinctive unit insignia was originally approved for the 153rd Regiment infantry on 6 January 1930. It was amended on 30 June 1930. On 4 June 1951 the insignia was amended to show additional war service.

=== Coat of arms ===
Blazon: Shield: Azure, a bend wavy between a fleur-de-lis and a giant cactus Argent; on a chief of the last a Great Bear's face of the like fimbriated of the first, lips and tongue Gules.

Crest: That for the regiments of the Arkansas National Guard: On a wreath of the colors (Argent and Azure) above two sprays of apple blossoms Proper a diamond Argent charged with four mullets Azure, one in upper point and three in lower, within a bordure of the last bearing twenty-five mullets of the second.

Symbolism: The shield is blue for Infantry. The wavy bend, representing the Arkansas River, refers to the geographic location of the regiment. The cactus symbolizes service on the Mexican border and the fleur-de-lis service in France during World War I. The Great Bear's face from the shoulder sleeve insignia of the Alaskan Department symbolizes service in that area in World War II.

Background: The coat of arms was originally approved for the 153rd Regiment Infantry on 6 January 1930. It was amended on 4 June 1951 to show additional war service.
