= 3 Squadron =

3 Squadron or 3rd Squadron may refer to:

== Aviation squadrons ==
- No. 3 Squadron IAF
- No. 3 Squadron RAAF
- No. 3 Squadron RAF
- No. 3 Squadron RAF Regiment, a British field squadron
- No. 3 Squadron RCAF
- No. 3 Squadron RJAF
- No. 3 Squadron RNZAF
- 3rd Air Squadron, Indonesia
- 3rd Tactical Squadron, Poland
- 3rd Tactical Fighter Squadron (JASDF), Japan
- 3rd Squadron (Iraq)
- Air Patrol Squadron 3 (JMSDF), Japan

=== United States ===
- 3rd Airlift Squadron
- 3rd Combat Weather Squadron
- 3rd Flying Training Squadron
- 3rd Special Operations Squadron
- VFAW-3 (Weather Fighter Squadron 3), Navy
- VF-3 (Fighting Squadron 3), Navy
- VP-3 (Patrol Squadron 3), Navy
- VQ-3 (Fleet Air Reconnaissance Squadron 3), Navy

== Naval squadrons ==
- 3rd Aircraft Carrier Squadron, Royal Navy
- 3rd Battle Squadron, Royal Navy
- 3rd Battlecruiser Squadron, Royal Navy
- 3rd Destroyer Squadron, Royal Navy
- Destroyer Squadron 3, United States Navy
- Submarine Squadron 3, United States Navy

== See also ==
- 3rd Wing
