= 3rd Regiment =

3rd Regiment or Third Regiment may refer to:

== Australia ==
- 3rd/4th Cavalry Regiment (Australia)
- 3rd Combat Engineer Regiment (Australia)

== Canada ==
- 3rd Prince of Wales' Canadian Dragoons
- 3rd Regiment, Canadian Mounted Rifles

== Confederate States ==
- 3rd Alabama Infantry Regiment
- 3rd Arkansas Cavalry Regiment (Confederate)
- 3rd Arkansas Consolidated Infantry Regiment
- 3rd Arkansas Infantry Regiment (Confederate)
- 3rd Florida Infantry Regiment
- 3rd Kentucky Infantry Regiment (Confederate)
- 3rd Louisiana Infantry Regiment
- 3d Mississippi Cavalry Regiment
- 3rd Mississippi Infantry Regiment
- 3rd Missouri Cavalry Regiment (Confederate)
- 3rd Missouri Infantry Regiment (Confederate)
- 3rd Regiment, Arkansas State Troops
- 3rd Texas Cavalry Regiment
- 3rd Texas Cavalry Regiment (Arizona Brigade)
- 3rd Texas Infantry Regiment
- 3rd Virginia Cavalry Regiment
- 3rd Virginia Infantry Regiment

== France ==
- 3rd Algerian Tirailleurs Regiment
- 3rd Cuirassier Regiment (France)
- 3rd Dragoon Regiment (France)
- 3rd Foot Grenadier Regiment of the Imperial Guard
- 3rd Foreign Infantry Regiment
- 3rd Combat Helicopter Regiment
- 3rd Marine Infantry Regiment
- 3rd Marine Infantry Parachute Regiment
- 3rd Parachute Chasseur Regiment

== Greece ==
- 3/40 Evzone Regiment
- Serres Division

== India ==
- 3rd Bengal Light Cavalry
- 3rd Bombay European Regiment
- 3rd Brahmans
- 3rd Cavalry Regiment (India)
- 3rd Gorkha Rifles
- 3rd Madras Regiment
- 3rd Regiment of Bengal Native Infantry
- 3rd Skinner's Horse

== Italy ==
- 3rd Alpini Regiment
- 3rd Armored Infantry Regiment (Italy)
- 3rd Army Aviation Support Regiment "Aquila"
- 3rd Artillery Regiment "Pistoia"
- 3rd Bersaglieri Regiment
- 3rd Engineer Regiment (Italy)
- 3rd Field Artillery Regiment (Mountain)
- 3rd Heavy Artillery Regiment "Volturno"
- 3rd Regiment "Granatieri di Sardegna"
- 3rd Signal Regiment (Italy)
- 3rd Targeting Support Regiment "Bondone"
- Regiment "Savoia Cavalleria" (3rd)

== Japan ==
- 3rd Tank Regiment (Japan)

== Lithuania ==
- 3rd Infantry Regiment (Lithuania)

== Poland ==
- 3rd Infantry Regiment (Duchy of Warsaw)
- 3rd Silesian Uhlan Regiment
- 3rd Uhlan Regiment (Duchy of Warsaw)

== South Africa ==
- 3rd South African Infantry Regiment

== Spain ==
- 3rd Swiss Regiment Reding

== United Kingdom ==
- 3rd County of London Yeomanry (Sharpshooters)
- 3rd (UK) Division Signal Regiment
- 3rd Dragoon Guards
- 3rd East Anglian Regiment
- 3rd Regiment of Foot (redesignated The Buffs (Royal East Kent Regiment))
- 3rd Regiment of Foot Guards (redesignated Scots Guards)
- 3rd Regiment Royal Horse Artillery
- 3rd Royal Lancashire Militia (The Duke of Lancaster's Own)
- 3rd (Royal Northumberland Fusiliers) Reconnaissance Regiment
- 3rd Royal Tank Regiment
- 3rd The King's Own Hussars
- King's Own (3rd Staffordshire) Rifle Militia

== United States ==
- 3rd Air Defense Artillery Regiment
- 3rd Arkansas Cavalry Regiment (Union)
- 3rd Aviation Regiment (United States)
- 3rd Battalion, 3rd Marines
- 3rd California Infantry Regiment
- 3rd Cavalry Regiment (United States)
- 3rd Connecticut Infantry Regiment
- 3rd Connecticut Regiment
- 3rd Continental Artillery Regiment
- 3rd Continental Light Dragoons
- 3rd Delaware Infantry Regiment
- 3rd Field Artillery Regiment (United States)
- 3rd Georgia Regiment
- 3rd Infantry Regiment (United States)
- 3rd Illinois Cavalry Regiment
- 3rd Iowa Cavalry Regiment
- 3rd Iowa Infantry Regiment
- 3rd Indiana Cavalry Regiment
- 3rd Indiana Volunteers (Mexican-American War)
- 3rd Kansas Infantry Regiment
- 3rd Kansas Militia Infantry Regiment
- 3rd Kentucky Cavalry Regiment (Union)
- 3rd Kentucky Infantry Regiment (Union)
- 3rd Maine Infantry Regiment
- 3rd Marine Littoral Regiment
- 3rd Maryland Infantry Regiment
- 3rd Maryland Infantry Regiment, Potomac Home Brigade
- 3rd Maryland Regiment
- 3rd Massachusetts Cavalry Regiment
- 3rd Massachusetts Heavy Artillery Regiment
- 3rd Massachusetts Militia Regiment
- 3rd Michigan Cavalry Regiment
- 3rd Michigan Infantry Regiment
- 3rd Michigan Infantry Regiment (reorganized)
- 3rd Minnesota Infantry Regiment
- 3rd Missouri Cavalry Regiment (Union)
- 3rd Missouri Colored Infantry Regiment
- 3rd Missouri Infantry Regiment (Union)
- 3rd Missouri US Reserve Corps Infantry Regiment
- 3rd New Hampshire Infantry Regiment
- 3rd New Hampshire Regiment
- 3rd New Jersey Cavalry Regiment
- 3rd New Jersey Regiment
- 3rd New York Provisional Cavalry Regiment
- 3rd New York Regiment
- 3rd North Carolina Regiment
- 3rd Ohio Infantry Regiment
- 3rd Pennsylvania Infantry Regiment
- 3rd Pennsylvania Regiment
- 3rd Regiment, New York State Artillery (redesignated 1st Battalion, 258th Field Artillery Regiment)
- 3rd Regiment of Riflemen
- 3rd Rhode Island Cavalry Regiment
- 3rd Rhode Island Heavy Artillery Regiment
- 3rd Rhode Island Infantry Regiment
- 3rd South Carolina Colored Infantry Regiment
- 3rd South Carolina Regiment
- 3rd Tennessee Cavalry Regiment
- 3rd Tennessee Infantry Regiment
- 3rd United States Colored Heavy Artillery Regiment
- 3rd United States Colored Infantry Regiment
- 3rd U.S. Dragoons
- 3rd Vermont Infantry Regiment
- 3rd Virginia Regiment
- 3rd Virginia Volunteer Infantry Regiment (1898)
- 3rd West Virginia Cavalry Regiment
- 3rd West Virginia Infantry Regiment
- 3rd Wisconsin Cavalry Regiment
- 3rd Wisconsin Infantry Regiment

== Yugoslavia ==
- 3rd Air Reconnaissance Regiment
- 3rd Training Aviation Regiment (redesignated 105th Fighter-Bomber Aviation Regiment)
