= List of songs recorded by Rufus Wainwright =

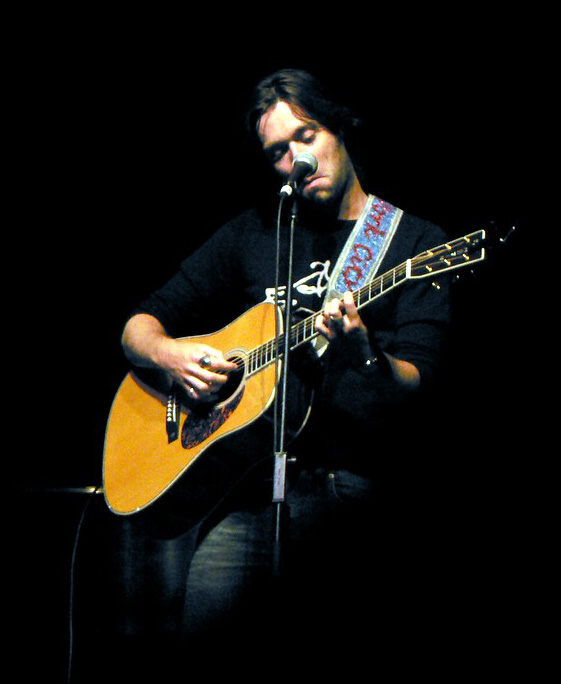
Rufus Wainwright in concert.

The columns Song, Album, and Year list each song title, the official release on which the song first appeared, and the year in which the song was released for the first time. The columns Length, Author, and Producer indicate the length of the track, the author of the song (most often Wainwright alone), and the producer of the track. References are also provided for each song in the last column of the table. While many songs listed appear on multiple releases (for example, "Spotlight on Christmas" appears on Maybe This Christmas Too?, The McGarrigle Christmas Hour, and Elton John's Christmas Party), songs are listed based on the first release and only appear twice when the recordings have different production information (producer, length, etc.).

The list includes original songs released on studio recordings, songs written but not performed by Wainwright, original songs performed live, and recorded cover songs.

== Original songs ==
=== Studio recordings ===
Following is a list of original songs by Wainwright that have been released on a studio album, EP, soundtrack, compilation album, single, or DVD. Also included is "Ode to Antidote", a studio-quality promotional single used to promote a perfume by Viktor & Rolf, and "Patience is a Virtue", an original song available via digital download on Wal-Mart's website with the purchase of Release the Stars.

Song	Album	Year	Length	Author	Producer	Ref.
"11:11"	Want One	2003	4:27	Wainwright	Marius de Vries	
"14th Street"	Want One	2003	4:44	Wainwright	Marius de Vries	
"A Bit of You"	Rufus Wainwright [Japan]	1999	5:00	Wainwright	Pierre Marchand	
"Agnus Dei"	Want Two	2004	5:45	Wainwright	Marius de Vries	
"Another Believer"	Meet the Robinsons	2007	4:39	Wainwright		
"April Fools"	Rufus Wainwright	1998	5:00	Wainwright	Jon Brion	
"Ashes" (original demo)	House of Rufus	2011	4:37	Wainwright		
"As in Happy"	Want Two [DVD]	2004	3:40	Wainwright		
"Baby"	Rufus Wainwright	1998	5:13	Wainwright	Jon Brion, Van Dyke Parks	
"Barbara"	Out of the Game	2012	3:55	Wainwright	Mark Ronson	
"Barcelona"	Rufus Wainwright	1998	6:53	Wainwright	Jon Brion	
"Beautiful Child"	Want One	2003	4:15	Wainwright	Marius de Vries	
"Beauty Mark"	Rufus Wainwright	1998	2:14	Wainwright	Jon Brion	
"Between My Legs"	Release the Stars	2007	4:26	Wainwright	Wainwright, Marius de Vries	
"Bitter Tears"	Out of the Game	2012	3:31	Wainwright	Mark Ronson	
"California"	Poses	2001	3:23	Wainwright	Ethan Johns	
"Candles"	Out of the Game	2012	7:41	Wainwright	Mark Ronson	
"Chic and Pointless"	Vibrate: The Best of Rufus Wainwright	2014	3:49	Wainwright	Guy Chambers	
"Cigarettes and Chocolate Milk"	Poses	2001	4:44	Wainwright	Pierre Marchand	
"Cigarettes and Chocolate Milk" [Reprise]	Poses	2001	3:59	Wainwright	Pierre Marchand	
"Cowboy Song"	Release the Stars [US]	2007	3:45	Wainwright		
"Crumb by Crumb"	Want Two	2004	4:11	Wainwright	Marius de Vries	
"Damned Ladies"	Rufus Wainwright	1998	4:07	Wainwright	Jon Brion	
"Danny Boy"	Rufus Wainwright	1998	6:12	Wainwright	Jon Brion	
"Dinner at Eight"	Want One	2003	4:31	Wainwright	Marius de Vries	
"Do I Disappoint You"	Release the Stars	2007	4:40	Wainwright	Wainwright	
"Do I Disappoint You" [Instrumental]	Release the Stars [UK]	2007	4:38	Wainwright	Wainwright	
"Dreams and Daydreams"	House of Rufus	2011		Wainwright		
"Es Muß Sein"	Want One [Japan, UK]	2003	2:20	Wainwright	Marius de Vries	
"Evil Angel"	Poses	2001	4:43	Wainwright	Pierre Marchand	
"Fame into Love into Death"	House of Rufus	2011		Wainwright		
"Foolish Love"	Rufus Wainwright	1998	5:46	Wainwright	Jon Brion	
"Forever and a Year"	Holding the Man (film)	2015	4:27	Wainwright		
"Gay Messiah"	Want Two	2004	3:15	Wainwright	Marius de Vries	
"Give Me What I Want and Give It to Me Now!"	All Days Are Nights: Songs for Lulu	2010	2:08	Wainwright	Wainwright, Pierre Marchand	
"Go Or Go Ahead"	Want One	2003	6:38	Wainwright	Marius de Vries	
"Going to a Town"	Release the Stars	2007	4:06	Wainwright	Wainwright	
"Greek Song"	Poses	2001	3:56	Wainwright	Pierre Marchand	
"Grey Gardens"	Poses	2001	3:08	Wainwright	Pierre Marchand	
"Hankering"	House of Rufus	2011		Wainwright		
"Harvester of Hearts"	Want One	2003	3:35	Wainwright	Marius de Vries	
"Heartburn"	The McGarrigle Hour	1998	2:28	Wainwright	Joe Boyd	
"Hometown Waltz"	Want Two	2004	2:31	Wainwright	Wainwright	
"I Don't Know What It Is"	Want One	2003	4:51	Wainwright	Marius de Vries	
"Imaginary Love"	Rufus Wainwright	1998	3:28	Wainwright	Jon Brion	
"In a Graveyard"	Poses	2001	2:22	Wainwright	Pierre Marchand	
"In My Arms"	Rufus Wainwright	1998	4:09	Wainwright	Pierre Marchand	
"Instead of the Dead"	Every Mother Counts 2012	2012	5:01	Wainwright		
"In with the Ladies"	Want	2005	3:52	Wainwright, Alex Gifford	Alex Gifford	
"Jericho"	Out of the Game	2012	3:43	Wainwright	Mark Ronson	
"Katonah"	Plague Songs	2006	4:16	Wainwright	Hal Willner	
"Leaving for Paris"	Want One [France]	2004	3:48	Wainwright		
"Leaving for Paris No. 2"	Release the Stars	2007	4:52	Wainwright	Wainwright	
"Les feux d'artifice t'appellent"	All Days Are Nights: Songs for Lulu	2010	5:57	Wainwright, Bernadette Colomine	Pierre Marchand	
"Liberty Cabbage"	Want Two [DVD]	2004	4:55	Wainwright		
"Little Sister"	Want Two	2004	3:20	Wainwright	Marius de Vries	
"London"	House of Rufus	2011		Wainwright		
"Low Grade Happiness"	Going to a Town [UK Single]	2007	5:24	Wainwright		
"Martha"	All Days Are Nights: Songs for Lulu	2010	3:12	Wainwright	Wainwright	
"Matinée Idol"	Rufus Wainwright	1998	3:08	Wainwright	Jon Brion	
"Me and Liza"	Vibrate: The Best of Rufus Wainwright	2014	3:21	Guy Chambers, Wainwright		
"Memphis Skyline"	Want Two	2004	4:52	Wainwright	Marius de Vries	
"Metaphorical Blanket"	Any Day Now soundtrack	2012	2:53	Wainwright		
"Millbrook"	Rufus Wainwright	1998	2:11	Wainwright	Jon Brion, Van Dyke Parks	
"Money Song" (original demo)	House of Rufus	2011	4:58	Wainwright		
"Montauk"	Out of the Game	2012	3:56	Wainwright	Mark Ronson	
"Movies of Myself"	Want One	2003	4:31	Wainwright	Marius de Vries	
"Natasha"	Want One	2003	3:28	Wainwright	Marius de Vries	
"Nobody's Off the Hook"	Release the Stars	2007	4:27	Wainwright	Wainwright	
"Not Ready to Love"	Release the Stars	2007	5:51	Wainwright	Wainwright	
"Ode to Antidote"	(Promotional)	2006	3:53	Wainwright		
"Oh What a World"	Want One	2003	4:23	Wainwright	Marius de Vries	
"Old Whore's Diet"	Want Two	2004	8:54	Wainwright	Wainwright, Marius de Vries	
"One More Chance"	House of Rufus	2011		Wainwright		
"Out of the Game"	Out of the Game	2012	4:05	Wainwright	Mark Ronson	
"Patience is a Virtue"	Release the Stars [US]	2007	5:59	Wainwright	Marius de Vries	
"Peach Trees"	Want Two	2004	5:59	Wainwright	Marius de Vries	
"Perfect Man"	Out of the Game	2012	3:58	Wainwright	Mark Ronson	
"Poses"	Poses	2001	5:02	Wainwright	Pierre Marchand	
"Pretty Things"	Want One	2003	2:38	Wainwright	Marius de Vries	
"Rashida"	Out of the Game	2012	3:00	Wainwright	Mark Ronson	
"Rebel Prince"	Poses	2001	3:44	Wainwright	Pierre Marchand	
"Red Thread"	House of Rufus	2011		Wainwright		
"Release the Stars"	Release the Stars	2007	5:20	Wainwright	Wainwright	
"Respectable Dive"	Out of the Game	2012	4:55	Wainwright	Mark Ronson	
"Rules and Regulations"	Release the Stars	2007	4:05	Wainwright	Wainwright	
"Sad with What I Have"	All Days Are Nights: Songs for Lulu	2010	3:06	Wainwright	Wainwright	
"Sally Ann"	Rufus Wainwright	1998	5:01	Wainwright	Jon Brion	
"Sanssouci"	Release the Stars	2007	5:16	Wainwright	Wainwright	
"Shadows"	Poses	2001	5:35	Wainwright, Alex Gifford	Alex Gifford	
"Shoes"	House of Rufus	2011		Wainwright		
"Slideshow"	Release the Stars	2007	6:21	Wainwright	Wainwright	
"Sometimes You Need"	Out of the Game	2012	3:20	Wainwright	Mark Ronson	
"Song of You"	Out of the Game	2012	4:50	Wainwright	Mark Ronson	
"Sonnet 10"	All Days Are Nights: Songs for Lulu	2010	2:57	Wainwright, Shakespeare	Wainwright	
"Sonnet 20"	All Days Are Nights: Songs for Lulu	2010	2:59	Wainwright, Shakespeare	Wainwright	
"Sonnet 29"	When Love Speaks	2002	3:00	Wainwright, Shakespeare		
"Sonnet 43"	All Days Are Nights: Songs for Lulu	2010	4:29	Wainwright, Shakespeare	Wainwright	
"Spotlight on Christmas"	Maybe This Christmas Too?	2004	3:23	Wainwright	Wainwright	
"Sword of Damocles"		2018				<
"The Art Teacher"	Want Two	2004	3:52	Wainwright	Marius de Vries	
"The Consort"	Poses	2001	4:25	Wainwright	Pierre Marchand	
"The Dream"	All Days Are Nights: Songs for Lulu	2010	5:27	Wainwright	Wainwright	
"The Maker Makes"	Brokeback Mountain	2005	3:50	Wainwright	Gustavo Santaolalla	
"The Motion Waltz (Emotional Commotion)"	Meet the Robinsons	2007	2:35	Wainwright		
"The Tower of Learning"	Poses	2001	4:47	Wainwright	Damian le Gassick	
"The One You Love"	Want Two	2004	3:43	Wainwright	Marius de Vries	
"This Love Affair"	Want Two	2004	3:13	Wainwright	Marius de Vries	
"Tiergarten"	Release the Stars	2007	3:26	Wainwright	Wainwright	
"True Loves"	All Days Are Nights: Songs for Lulu	2010	3:52	Wainwright	Wainwright	
"Tulsa"	Release the Stars	2007	2:19	Wainwright	Wainwright	
"Unfollow the Rules"		2018				
"Ups and Downs"	2 Chansons Inédites [France]	2001	3:05	Wainwright	Pierre Marchand	
"Velvet Curtain Rag"	Want One [UK]	2003	2:32	Wainwright	Marius de Vries	
"Vibrate"	Want One	2003	2:43	Wainwright	Marius de Vries	
"Vicious World"	Want One	2003	2:50	Wainwright	Marius de Vries	
"Waiting for a Dream"	Want Two	2004	4:14	Wainwright	Marius de Vries	
"Want"	Want One	2003	5:11	Wainwright	Marius de Vries	
"Welcome to the Ball"	Out of the Game	2012	3:26	Wainwright	Mark Ronson	
"What Would I Ever Do with a Rose?"	All Days Are Nights: Songs for Lulu	2010	4:23	Wainwright	Pierre Marchand	
"Who Are You New York?"	All Days Are Nights: Songs for Lulu	2010	3:42	Wainwright	Wainwright	
"WWIII"	Out of the Game	2012	3:56	Wainwright, Guy Chambers	Guy Chambers	
"Zebulon"	All Days Are Nights: Songs for Lulu	2010	5:38	Wainwright	Wainwright	

=== Songs written, but not performed, by Wainwright ===
Following is a chart containing songs originally written or co-written by Wainwright that do not appear on one of his original albums. The list includes songs performed solely by other artists and those that feature Wainwright as a co-lead or backing vocalist.

Song	Album	Year	Length	Author	Performer	Ref.
"Apartment"	The Performance	2009	3:26	Wainwright	Shirley Bassey	
"Au jardin des sans-pourquoi"	Illuminations	2010	3:32	Groban, McGarrigle, Wainwright	Josh Groban	
"Beauty"	Versatile Heart	2007	4:13	Wainwright	Linda Thompson	
"Missing Children"	Teddy Thompson	2000	4:30	Teddy Thompson, Wainwright	Teddy Thompson	
"More Wine"	Restless Night	2002	5:03	Julianna Raye, Wainwright	Julianna Raye, Wainwright	
"Waterloo Station"	Fictions	2006	3:31	Wainwright	Jane Birkin	
"Where is Your Heart At?"	Meet the Robinsons	2007	2:23	Wainwright	Jamie Cullum	

=== Demo recordings ===
These songs appear on Wainwright's 1995 demo cassette (Desdemona Publishing) recorded by Pierre Marchand.

Side A

- "Foolish Love" – 5:13
- "Heart Like a Highway" (also known as "That Night") – 4:15
- "Money Song" (also known as "The Money Song") – 4:59
- "Danny Boy" – 5:01

Side B

- "Beauty Mark" – 2:06
- "Damned Ladies" – 3:39
- "Liberty Cabbage" – 3:40
- "Ashes" – 4:40
- "Matinée Idol" – 3:19

=== Songs performed live ===
Following is a list of songs by Wainwright that have been performed live but have yet to appear on an official release:

- "Christmas is for Kids"
- "Rainbow Crossing"
- "Schubert Song"
- "The Bela Song"
- "Two Gold Rings (Trafalgar Square)"
- "Lucy's Blue"

=== Songs written for stage ===
- "One's-Self I Sing" (Walt Whitman), "Lux Aeterna Luceat Eis, Domine", "Unseen Buds" (Whitman), and "Hope Is the Thing With Feathers" (Emily Dickinson) were part of a six-movement choral collection composed for the Stephen Petronio Company production Bloom in 2006.
- Based on Shakespeare's sonnets, "Sonnet 10", "Sonnet 20", and "Sonnet 43" were originally composed for Robert Wilson's staging of Shakespeares Sonette in Berlin in April 2009.

== Cover songs ==
Song	Album	Year	Length	Author	Producer	Ref.
"A Foggy Day"	Rufus Does Judy at Carnegie Hall	2007	2:55	George Gershwin, Ira Gershwin	Phil Ramone	
"Across the Universe"	I Am Sam	2002	4:08	Lennon–McCartney		
"Across the Universe"	Poses [US]	2002	4:10	Lennon–McCartney		
"After You've Gone" (with Lorna Luft)	Rufus Does Judy at Carnegie Hall	2007	2:57	Henry Creamer, Turner Layton	Phil Ramone	
"Albatross"	Born to the Breed...	2008	5:14	Judy Collins		
"Alone Together"	Rufus Does Judy at Carnegie Hall	2007	3:21	Howard Dietz, Arthur Schwartz	Phil Ramone	
"Banks of the Wabash"	The Myth of Fingerprints	1997	4:34	Paul Dresser		
"Bewitched"	The History Boys	2006	5:21	Lorenz Hart, Richard Rodgers		
"Chelsea Hotel No. 2"	Want	2005	3:55	Leonard Cohen	Hal Willner	
"Chelsea Hotel No. 2"	Leonard Cohen: I'm Your Man	2006	3:47	Leonard Cohen	Hal Willner	
"Chicago"	Rufus Does Judy at Carnegie Hall	2007	4:30	Fred Fisher	Phil Ramone	
"Coeur de Parisienne - Reprise d'Arletty"	Want Two [Canada]	2004	2:46	Arletty		
"Come Rain or Come Shine"	Rufus Does Judy at Carnegie Hall	2007	3:56	Harold Arlen, Johnny Mercer	Phil Ramone	
"Complainte de la Butte"	Moulin Rouge!	2001	3:05	Jean Renoir, Georges Van Parys	Michel Pepin, Wainwright	
"Do It Again"	Rufus Does Judy at Carnegie Hall	2007	5:15	George Gershwin, Buddy DeSylva	Phil Ramone	
"Everybody Knows"	Leonard Cohen: I'm Your Man	2006	4:30	Leonard Cohen	Hal Willner	
"Ev'ry Time We Say Goodbye" (feat. Kate McGarrigle)	Rufus! Does Judy!...	2007	3:13	Cole Porter		
"Get Happy"	Rufus Does Judy at Carnegie Hall	2007	3:12	Harold Arlen, Ted Koehler	Phil Ramone	
"Hallelujah"	Shrek	2001	4:08	Leonard Cohen		
"He Ain't Heavy... He's My Brother"	Zoolander	2001	4:38	Bobby Scott, Bob Russell		
"How Long Has This Been Going On?"	Rufus Does Judy at Carnegie Hall	2007	5:46	George Gershwin, Ira Gershwin	Phil Ramone	
"I Can't Give You Anything But Love"	Rufus Does Judy at Carnegie Hall	2007	8:11	Dorothy Fields, Jimmy McHugh	Phil Ramone	
"I Eat Dinner (When the Hunger's Gone)" (with Dido)	Bridget Jones: The Edge of Reason	2004	5:39	Kate McGarrigle		
"I Wonder What Became of Me"	Stormy Weather...	2003	3:36	Harold Arlen, Johnny Mercer		
"If Love Were All"	Rufus Does Judy at Carnegie Hall	2007	2:33	Noël Coward	Phil Ramone	
"Instant Pleasure"	Big Daddy	1999	3:40	Seth Swirsky		
"It's Only a Paper Moon"	Stormy Weather...	2003	4:42	Harold Arlen, Yip Harburg, Billy Rose		
"Jimbo Jambo"	Boardwalk Empire Volume 2: Music from the HBO Original Series	2013	3:04	Billy Frisch, Billy Hueston, Nat Vincent		
"Just You, Just Me"	Rufus Does Judy at Carnegie Hall	2007	2:03	Jesse Greer, Raymond Klages	Phil Ramone	
"King of the Road" (with Teddy Thompson)	Brokeback Mountain	2005	2:52	Roger Miller	Gustavo Santaolalla	
"L'Absence"	Want Two [DVD]	2004	4:34	Berlioz		
"Le Roi d'Ys" (Vainement, ma bien-aimée)	The Myth of Fingerprints	1997	3:23	Édouard Lalo, Wainwright		
"Lowlands Away" (with Kate McGarrigle)	Rogue's Gallery...	2006	3:25	Traditional		
"Macushla"	Milwaukee at Last!!!	2009	3:51	Dermot MacMurrough, Josephine V. Rowe		
Medley: "Almost Like Being in Love" / "This Can't Be Love"	Rufus Does Judy at Carnegie Hall	2007	6:10	Alan Jay Lerner, Frederick Loewe / Richard Rodgers, Lorenz Hart	Phil Ramone	
Medley: "You Made Me Love You" / "For Me and My Gal" / "The Trolley Song"	Rufus Does Judy at Carnegie Hall	2007	4:37	J. McCarthy, James V. Monaco, Roger Edens / D. Furber, L. Arthur Rose	Phil Ramone	
"Miss Otis Regrets"	House of Rufus	2011		Cole Porter		
"My Funny Valentine"	Sweetheart 2005: Love Songs	2005	3:24	Lorenz Hart, Richard Rodgers		
"Old Paint" (with Loudon Wainwright III)	Release the Stars [Bonus]	2007	2:42	Traditional		
"One Man Guy"	Poses	2001	3:31	Loudon Wainwright III	Pierre Marchand	
"Over the Rainbow"	Rufus Does Judy at Carnegie Hall	2007	4:47	Harold Arlen, Yip Harburg	Phil Ramone	
"Overture: The Trolley Song / Over the Rainbow / The Man That Got Away"	Rufus Does Judy at Carnegie Hall	2007	4:15	Ralph Blane, Hugh Martin / Harold Arlen, Yip Harburg / Arlen, Ira Gershwin	Phil Ramone	
"Puttin' on the Ritz"	Rufus Does Judy at Carnegie Hall	2007	1:56	Irving Berlin	Phil Ramone	
"Quand Vous Mourez de Nos Amours"	Want Two [Canada]	2004	3:23	Gilles Vigneault		
"Rock-a-Bye Your Baby with a Dixie Melody"	Rufus Does Judy at Carnegie Hall	2007	5:45	Sam M. Lewis, F. Schwartz, J. Young	Phil Ramone	
"San Francisco"	Rufus Does Judy at Carnegie Hall	2007	4:53	Walter Jurmann, Gus Kahn, B. Kaper	Phil Ramone	
"Sonnet 10"	All Days Are Nights: Songs for Lulu	2010	2:56	William Shakespeare		
"Sonnet 20"	All Days Are Nights: Songs for Lulu	2010	2:59	Shakespeare		
"Sonnet 43"	All Days Are Nights: Songs for Lulu	2010	4:28	Shakespeare		
"St. James Infirmary"	House of Rufus	2011		Traditional		
"Swanee"	Rufus Does Judy at Carnegie Hall	2007	1:54	Irving Caesar, George Gershwin	Phil Ramone	
"That's Entertainment!"	Rufus Does Judy at Carnegie Hall	2007	2:27	Howard Dietz, Arthur Schwartz	Phil Ramone	
"The Man That Got Away"	Rufus Does Judy at Carnegie Hall	2007	4:59	Harold Arlen, Ira Gershwin	Phil Ramone	
"The Origin of Love"	Wig in a Box	2003	5:36	Stephen Trask		
"What Are You Doing New Year's Eve"	The McGarrigle Christmas Hour	2005	3:02	Frank Loesser	Kate and Anna McGarrigle	
"When You're Smiling (The Whole World Smiles With You)"	Rufus Does Judy at Carnegie Hall	2007	3:44	Mark Fisher, Joe Goodwin, Larry Shay	Phil Ramone	
"Who Cares? (As Long as You Care for Me)"	Rufus Does Judy at Carnegie Hall	2007	2:08	George Gershwin, Ira Gershwin	Phil Ramone	
"Wonderful" / "Song for Children"	War Child Presents Heroes	2009	5:36	Brian Wilson		
"You Go to My Head"	Rufus Does Judy at Carnegie Hall	2007	2:40	J. Fred Coots, Haven Gillespie	Phil Ramone	
"You're Nearer"	Rufus Does Judy at Carnegie Hall	2007	1:58	Richard Rodgers, Lorenz Hart	Phil Ramone	
"Zing! Went the Strings of My Heart"	Rufus Does Judy at Carnegie Hall	2007	3:48	J. F. Hanely	Phil Ramone	

== See also ==
- List of awards and nominations received by Rufus Wainwright
- Rufus Wainwright discography
