= House of Rufus =

2011 box set by Rufus Wainwright

Box set by Rufus Wainwright
- Released: July 18, 2011
- Recorded: 1995–2011
- Language: English
- Labels: Decca, DreamWorks, Geffen
- Producers: Jon Brion, Nick de Grunwald, Marius de Vries, Alex Gifford, Ethan Johns, Bradley Kaplan, Damian LeGassick, Pierre Marchand, Paula Quijano, Phil Ramone, George Scott, Martin R. Smith, Barry Taylor, Rufus Wainwright, Greg Wells

Rufus Wainwright chronology
| All Days Are Nights: Songs for Lulu (2010) | House of Rufus (2011) | Out of the Game (2012) |

House of Rufus is a collection of six studio albums, two live albums (one being a double album), four additional albums of previously unreleased material, and six DVDs recorded by Canadian-American singer-songwriter Rufus Wainwright, reissued as a 19-disc box set in the United Kingdom on July 18, 2011. Wainwright's official site claimed that the collection "spans Rufus' entire career and represents the most complete collection of Rufus Wainwright recordings to date."

The box set's title commemorates his five-night residency of the same name at London's Royal Opera House during July 18–23, 2011. Only 3,000 copies were produced for worldwide distribution. The collection contains "hard-to-find" tracks and is encased in a red velvet-covered book. While some reviewers questioned the need for such an extensive collection, critical reception of the box set was mostly positive.

== Background ==
The box set's release was confirmed on Wainwright's official site on March 21, 2011. Only 3,000 copies were produced for worldwide distribution. Box sets were sold for £150 in the United Kingdom, €170 throughout Europe, and were available as imports in the United States for $350. As part of the marketing strategy to promote the collection and concert series, Universal Music Catalogue developed a "treasure hunt" video for YouTube where visitors identified clues, and navigated links within a collage of Wainwright's music videos. According to Wainwright, the rarities box set was a "little Rufus blast" before he began work on his next pop album. Wainwright also said the following of the collection: "There's my old demos, a lot of them were recorded in Montreal... when I had a very, very different voice, I kind of sounded like a little old man. There's that and there's a lot of fabulous collaborations with my mother, my father and some other great artists." Wainwright had originally intended to call the box set The Rufus Cycle. After being told the title was "too sophisticated", he went with House of Rufus, partly inspired by the name of Lady Gaga's creative team, the Haus of Gaga. Wainwright claimed the box set's release shortly after his father's (Loudon Wainwright III) box set 40 Odd Years was "totally serendipitous".

The box set's title commemorates Wainwright's five-night residency at London's Royal Opera House during July 18–23, 2011, also referred to as the "House of Rufus" (sometimes the "Haus of Rufus") or billed as "Five Nights of Velvet, Glamour and Guilt". During the first night, Wainwright performed his tribute concert to Judy Garland, recorded previously in June 2006, and released as Rufus Does Judy at Carnegie Hall in 2007. The production was repeated on July 22, the fourth concert of the series. The July 19 and 21 shows included performances alongside his sister Martha Wainwright and father Loudon. The residency's final night included a program called "Rufus Does Rufus", and featured Wainwright performing selections from his 2009 opera Prima Donna. Stephen Oremus conducted the Britten Sinfonia for three of the performances, and soprano Janis Kelly was featured in the "concert version" of Prima Donna. Reception of the residency performances was mixed.

== Contents ==
... I'm very very lucky to have over the years worked with so many wonderful people, made some pretty good music and traveled all over the world to see you folks, the fans, and I thank you profusely from the bottom of my heart for generously supporting my career and spending a lot of money on this beautifully crafted collection of my work.

— Wainwright on the reason his box set was released at age 37

The box set contains six studio albums: Rufus Wainwright (1998), Poses (2001), Want One (2003), Want Two (2004), Release the Stars (2007), and All Days Are Nights: Songs for Lulu (2010). Each of the albums contain material that was not released previously. Also included are two live albums—the Grammy-nominated 2007 double album Rufus Does Judy at Carnegie Hall, and Milwaukee at Last!!!, released in 2009—each with previously unreleased tracks, along with four additional albums of rarities and six DVDs. Musicians described as "friends and family members" who appear on one disc of collaborations include Kate & Anna McGarrigle, The Pet Shop Boys, Teddy Thompson, Martha Wainwright, and Loudon Wainwright III. Another disc contains demo tracks from the tape which earned Wainwright a recording contract. DVD recordings include: Live at the Fillmore, Rufus! Rufus! Rufus! Does Judy! Judy! Judy!: Live from the London Palladium, Milwaukee at Last!!!, a collection of Release the Stars commentary and live performances, All I Want and Prima Donna: The Making of an Opera. House of Rufus contains approximately thirty unreleased or "hard-to-find" tracks. The collection is encased in a "red velvet-covered 90-page hardback book" featuring lyrics, photos, hand-drawn tour posters, art prints, and liner notes by Neil Tennant, Linda Thompson, Lenny Waronker, Martha Wainwright, and Rufus himself. Wainwright dedicated the box set to publicist Barbara Charone, "without whom it wouldn't have been possible".

== Reception ==
Professional ratings
Review scores
| Source | Rating |
|---|---|
| BBC Music | Positive |
| The Daily Telegraph | 4/5 stars |
| Evening Standard | 3/5 stars |
| The Irish Times | 4/5 stars |

Critical reception of the box set was mostly positive, though some reviewers questioned the necessity for such an elaborate collection, especially given Wainwright's age, and the higher-than-expected price. Will Hodgkinson of The Times wrote that a box set for Wainwright, whom he described as a "not yet middle-aged artist", was unnecessary, but that the collection "shine[s] a spotlight on its creator's rare, remarkable songwriting". Hodgkinson called Wainwright and the box set "charming" overall, but thought that the "excess of material stops the great moments from really shining out". Hive magazine contributor Luke Hannaford complimented Rufus and Loudon's performance of Richard Thompson's "Down Where the Drunkards Roll", which was recorded specifically for this collection, describing it as "achingly beautiful". Martin Aston's review for BBC Music was positive; in addition to other tracks, Aston complimented "Get Out of Town" (Cole Porter, 1938) and "Sweet Repose", both demos he considered to be "unreleased stunners that betray [Wainwright's] show tune soul".

Though she noted the higher-than-expected cost of the box set, Helen Brown of The Daily Telegraph wrote that it served as an "impressive array" that showcased Wainwright's range and hard work. Evening Standard contributor David Smyth wrote that "this luxurious treasure chest will be too deep for almost anyone apart from its creator". Smyth found the Rufus Family and Friends album to be "most charming", specifically "What'll I Do" which features the whole Wainwright family. Brian Boyd of The Irish Times considered the box set to be "sensory overload", and thought that the quality of the previously unreleased material appearing on the studio albums varied, but called the collection "magnificent... from a delightfully unorthodox and consistently engaging performer". Boyd also noted the cost of the box set, but complimented the quality of its packaging and "extras".

== Track listing ==
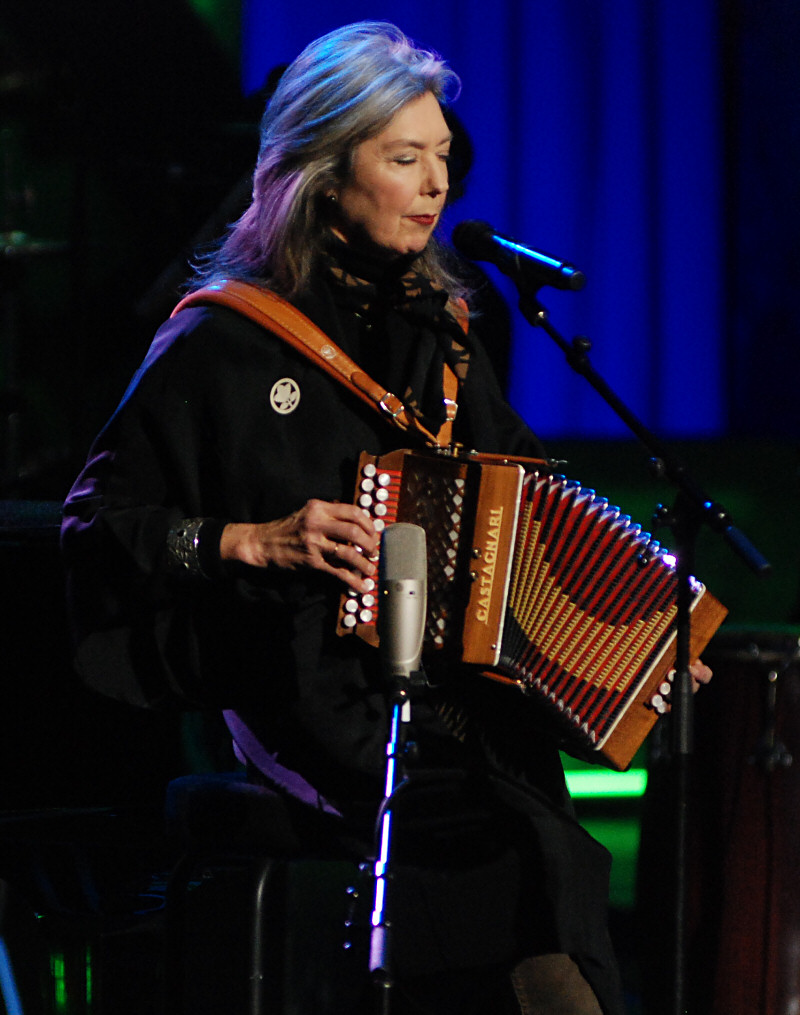
Kate McGarrigle of the duo Kate and Anna McGarrigle

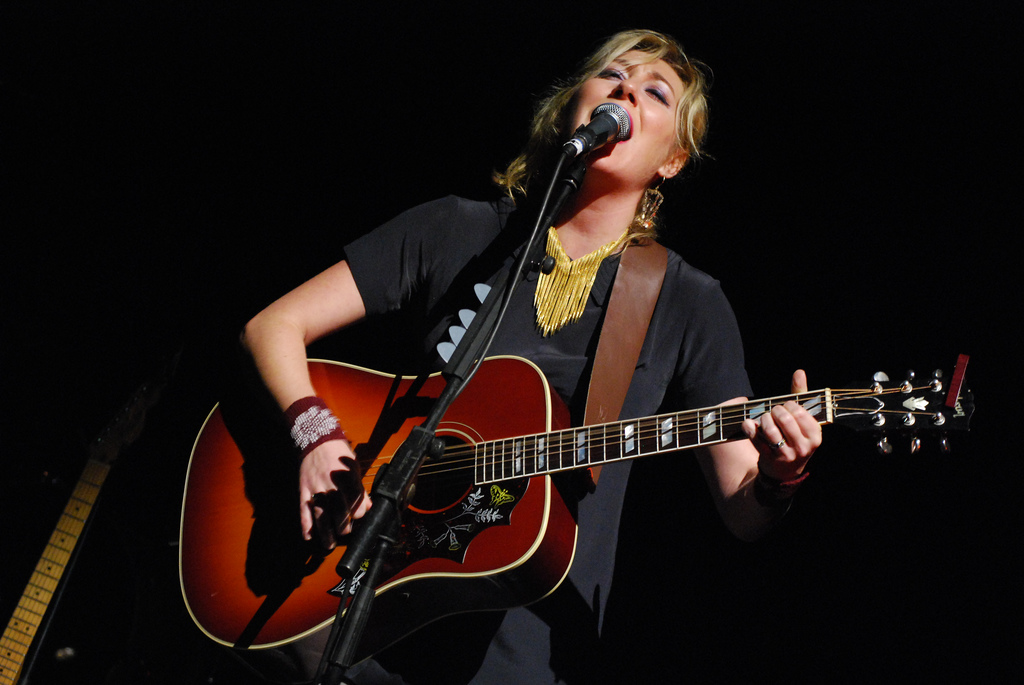
Martha Wainwright

=== Studio albums ===
| Rufus Wainwright (1998) |
|---|
All songs written by Wainwright.: 1. "Foolish Love" – 5:46; 2. "Danny Boy" – 6:12; 3. "April Fools" – 5:00; 4. "In My Arms" – 4:08; 5. "Millbrook" – 2:11; 6. "Baby" – 5:13; 7. "Beauty Mark" – 2:14; 8. "Barcelona" – 6:53; 9. "Matinee Idol" – 3:08; 10. "Damned Ladies" – 4:07; 11. "Sally Ann" – 5:01; 12. "Imaginary Love" – 3:28; Bonus tracks: 13. "Heartburn" (from The McGarrigle Hour) – 2:28; 14. "Goodnight Sweetheart" (from The McGarrigle Hour) – 2:10

| Poses (2001) |
|---|
All songs written by Wainwright, unless otherwise noted.: 1. "Cigarettes and Chocolate Milk" – 4:44; 2. "Greek Song" – 3:56; 3. "Poses" – 5:02; 4. "Shadows" (Alex Gifford, Wainwright) – 5:35; 5. "California" – 3:23; 6. "The Tower of Learning" – 4:47; 7. "Grey Gardens" – 3:08; 8. "Rebel Prince" – 3:44; 9. "The Consort" – 4:25; 10. "One Man Guy" (Loudon Wainwright III) – 3:31; 11. "Evil Angel" – 4:43; 12. "In a Graveyard" – 2:22; 13. "Cigarettes and Chocolate Milk" (reprise) – 3:59; Bonus tracks: 14. "Greek Song" (KCRW Session 5/6/01) – 4:17; 15. "California" (KCRW Session 5/6/01) – 3:24; 16. "Grey Gardens" (KCRW Session 5/6/01) – 5:01

| Want One (2003) |
|---|
All songs written by Wainwright.: 1. "Oh What a World" – 4:23; 2. "I Don't Know What It Is" – 4:51; 3. "Vicious World" – 2:50; 4. "Movies of Myself" – 4:31; 5. "Pretty Things" – 2:40; 6. "Go or Go Ahead" – 6:39; 7. "Vibrate" – 2:44; 8. "14th Street" – 4:44; 9. "Natasha" – 3:29; 10. "Harvester of Hearts" – 3:35; 11. "Beautiful Child" – 4:16; 12. "Want" – 5:11; 13. "11:11" – 4:27; 14. "Dinner at Eight" – 4:33; 15. "Es Muß Sein" (non-LP version) – 2:21; 16. "Velvet Curtain Rag" (non-LP version) – 2:30; Bonus tracks: 17. "What You Got"* – 3:30; 18. "11:11" (studio demo) – 4:27

| Want Two (2004) |
|---|
All songs written by Wainwright except for the first two bonus tracks.: 1. "Agnus Dei" – 5:45; 2. "The One You Love" – 3:44; 3. "Peach Trees" – 5:59; 4. "Little Sister" – 3:22; 5. "The Art Teacher" – 3:51; 6. "Hometown Waltz" – 2:33; 7. "This Love Affair" – 3:13; 8. "Gay Messiah" – 3:14; 9. "Memphis Skyline" – 4:51; 10. "Waiting for a Dream" – 4:14; 11. "Crumb by Crumb" – 4:13; 12. "Old Whore's Diet" – 9:09; Bonus tracks: 13. "Cœur de Parisienne – Reprise d'Arletty" (live) – 2:47; 14. "Quand vous mourrez de nos amours" (live) – 3:26; 15. "Southern Soul"* – 3:08; 16. "Gay Messiah" (studio demo)* – 3:46

| Release the Stars (2007) |
|---|
All songs written by Wainwright.: 1. "Do I Disappoint You" – 4:40; 2. "Going to a Town" – 4:06; 3. "Tiergarten" – 3:26; 4. "Nobody's off the Hook" – 4:27; 5. "Between My Legs" – 4:26; 6. "Rules and Regulations" – 4:05; 7. "Not Ready to Love" – 5:51; 8. "Slideshow" – 6:21; 9. "Tulsa" – 2:20; 10. "Leaving for Paris N° 2" – 4:52; 11. "Sanssouci" – 5:16; 12. "Release the Stars" – 5:20; 13. "Do I Disappoint You" (instrumental) – 4:42; Bonus tracks: 14. "Low Grade Happiness" (rare United Kingdom B-side) – 5:27; 15. "Going to a Town" (live at Kenwood House, London 3/7/10) – 4:25

| All Days Are Nights: Songs for Lulu (2010) |
|---|
All songs written by Wainwright, unless otherwise noted.: 1. "Who Are You New York?" – 3:42; 2. "Sad with What I Have" – 3:06; 3. "Martha" – 3:12; 4. "Give Me What I Want and Give It to Me Now!" – 2:08; 5. "True Loves" – 3:52; 6. "Sonnet 43" (William Shakespeare, Wainwright) – 4:28; 7. "Sonnet 20" (Shakespeare, Wainwright) – 2:59; 8. "Sonnet 10" (Shakespeare, Wainwright) – 2:56; 9. "The Dream" – 5:27; 10. "What Would I Ever Do with a Rose?" – 4:23; 11. "Les feux d'artifice t'appellent" (Wainwright, Bernadette Colomine) – 5:57; 12. "Zebulon" – 5:38; 13. "Les feux d'artifice t'appellent" (alternate version) – 5:31; Bonus tracks: 14. "Who Are You New York?" (live at Kenwood House, London. 3/7/10) – 3:31; 15. "Martha" (live at Kenwood House, London. 3/7/10) – 3:16; 16. "The Walking Song" (live at Kenwood House, London. 3/7/10) – 5:30

=== Live albums ===
| Rufus Does Judy at Carnegie Hall (2007) |
|---|
Disc 1: 1. Overture: "The Trolley Song" / "Over the Rainbow" / "The Man That Got Away" (Ralph Blane, Hugh Martin) / (Harold Arlen, Yip Harburg) / (Arlen, Ira Gershwin) – 4:15; 2. "When You're Smiling (The Whole World Smiles with You)" (Mark Fisher, Joe Goodwin, Larry Shay) – 3:44; 3. Medley: "Almost Like Being in Love" / "This Can't Be Love" (Alan Jay Lerner, Frederick Loewe) / (Richard Rodgers, Lorenz Hart) – 6:10; 4. "Do It Again" (George Gershwin, Buddy DeSylva) – 5:15; 5. "You Go to My Head" (J. Fred Coots, Haven Gillespie) – 2:40; 6. "Alone Together" (Howard Dietz, Arthur Schwartz) – 3:21; 7. "Who Cares? (As Long as You Care for Me)" (G. Gershwin, I. Gershwin) – 2:08; 8. "Puttin' on the Ritz" (Irving Berlin) – 1:56; 9. "How Long Has This Been Going On?" (G. Gershwin, I. Gershwin) – 5:46; 10. "Just You, Just Me" (Jesse Greer, Raymond Klages) – 2:03; 11. "The Man That Got Away" (Arlen, I. Gershwin) – 4:59; 12. "San Francisco" (Walter Jurmann, Gus Kahn, Bronisław Kaper) – 4:53; Disc 2: 1. "That's Entertainment!" (Dietz, Schwartz) – 2:27; 2. "I Can't Give You Anything but Love" (Dorothy Fields, Jimmy McHugh) – 8:11; 3. "Come Rain or Come Shine" (Arlen, Johnny Mercer) – 3:56; 4. "You're Nearer" (Rodgers, Hart) – 1:58; 5. "A Foggy Day" (G. Gershwin, I. Gershwin) – 2:55; 6. "If Love Were All" (Noël Coward) – 2:33; 7. "Zing! Went the Strings of My Heart" – (J. F. Hanely) – 3:48; 8. "Stormy Weather" (Arlen, Ted Koehler) – 6:45 (performed by Martha Wainwright); 9. Medley: "You Made Me Love You" / "For Me and My Gal" / "The Trolley Song" (Joseph McCarthy, James V. Monaco, Roger Edens) / (George W. Meyer, Edgar Leslie, E. Ray Goetz) / (Blane, Martin) – 4:37; 10. "Rock-a-Bye Your Baby with a Dixie Melody" (Sam M. Lewis, Fred Schwartz, Joe Young) – 5:45; 11. "Over the Rainbow" (Arlen, Harburg) – 4:47 (featuring Kate McGarrigle); 12. "Swanee" (Irving Caesar, G. Gershwin) – 1:54; 13. "After You've Gone" (Henry Creamer, Turner Layton) – 2:57 (featuring Lorna Luft); 14. "Chicago" (Fred Fisher) – 4:30; 15. "Get Happy" (Arlen, Koehler) – 3:12; Bonus tracks: 16. "Someone to Watch Over Me" (with Martha Wainwright)*; 17. "Everytime We Say Goodbye"*

| Milwaukee at Last (2009) |
|---|
All songs written by Wainwright, unless otherwise noted.: 1. "Release the Stars" – 5:54; 2. "Going to a Town" – 4:13; 3. "Sanssouci" – 5:49; 4. "Rules and Regulations" – 4:10; 5. "Leaving for Paris No. 2" – 6:04; 6. "If Love Were All" (Noël Coward) – 2:26; 7. "Nobody's off the Hook" – 4:26; 8. "Not Ready to Love" / "Slideshow" – 13:51; 9. "Macushla" (Dermot MacMurrough, Josephine V. Rowe) – 3:51; 10. "Gay Messiah" – 4:06

=== DVDs ===
| Live at the Fillmore (2004) |
|---|
1. "DVD Intro" (live); 2. "L'Absence" (live); 3. "14th Street" (live); 4. "Harvester of Hearts" (live); 5. "Natasha" (live); 6. "The Art Teacher" (live); 7. "Hallelujah" (live); 8. "Matinee Idol" (live); 9. "Vibrate" (live); 10. "Gay Messiah" (live); 11. "Want" (live); 12. "Greek Song" (live); 13. "Foolish" (live); 14. "I Don't Know What It Is" (live); 15. "Dinner at Eight" (live); 16. "Beautiful Child" (live); 17. "Oh What a World" (live); 18. "Liberty Cabbage" (live); 19. "California" (live); 20. "As in Happy" (live); 21. "DVD Credits" (live)

| All I Want (2005) |
|---|
1. "Overture" (A Portrait of Rufus Wainwright); 2. "Childhood" (A Portrait of Rufus Wainwright); 3. "New York, LA and the Big Break" (A Portrait of Rufus Wainwright); 4. "Pills, Partying and Poses" (A Portrait of Rufus Wainwright); 5. "Excess" (A Portrait of Rufus Wainwright); 6. "After the Party" (A Portrait of Rufus Wainwright); 7. "The Wants" (A Portrait of Rufus Wainwright); 8. "Hometown Waltz" (A Portrait of Rufus Wainwright); 9. "Gay Messiah" (Studio Frisson, Montreal Performance); 10. "Crumb by Crumb" (Studio Frisson, Montreal Performance); 11. "Rebel Prince" (Studio Frisson, Montreal Performance)]; 12. "The Art Teacher" (Studio Frisson, Montreal Performance); 13. "This Love Affair" (Studio Frisson, Montreal Performance); 14. "Poses" (Studio Frisson, Montreal Performance); 15. "Movies of Myself" (The Corn Exchange, Cambridge Performance); 16. "Go or Go Ahead" (The Corn Exchange, Cambridge Performance); 17. "I Don't Know What It Is" (The Corn Exchange, Cambridge Performance); 18. "Beautiful Child" (The Corn Exchange, Cambridge Performance); 19. "Beauty Mark" (Live at Central Park Summer Stage); 20. "Cigarettes and Chocolate Milk" (Live at Central Park Summer Stage); 21. "Dinner at Eight" (Live at Central Park Summer Stage); 22. "The One You Love" (music video); 23. "California" (music video); 24. "April Fools" (music video); 25. "The Maker Makes" (music video)

| Release the Stars DVD |
|---|
This DVD contains Release the Stars album commentary, live performances and two feature-length documentaries.: 1. "Track by Track Interview"; 2. "The Art Teacher" (Sympatico/MSN Presents Live at the Orange Lounge); 3. "Rebel Prince" (Sympatico/MSN Presents Live at the Orange Lounge); 4. "Gay Messiah" (Sympatico/MSN Presents Live at the Orange Lounge); 5. "Vibrate" (Sympatico/MSN Presents Live at the Orange Lounge)

| Rufus! Rufus! Rufus! Does Judy! Judy! Judy!: Live from the London Palladium (2007) |
|---|
1. Overture: "The Trolley Song" / "Over the Rainbow" / "The Man That Got Away" (Ralph Blane, Hugh Martin) / (Harold Arlen, Yip Harburg) / (Arlen, Ira Gershwin) – 5:26; 2. "When You're Smiling (The Whole World Smiles with You)" (Mark Fisher, Joe Goodwin, Larry Shay) – 3:37; 3. Medley: "Almost Like Being in Love" / "This Can't Be Love" (Alan Jay Lerner, Frederick Loewe) / (Richard Rodgers, Lorenz Hart) – 6:20; 4. "Do It Again" (George Gershwin, Buddy DeSylva) – 6:01; 5. "You Go to My Head" (J. Fred Coots, Haven Gillespie) – 2:47; 6. "Alone Together" (Howard Dietz, Arthur Schwartz) – 3:57; 7. "Who Cares? (As Long as You Care for Me)" (G. Gershwin, I. Gershwin) – 1:44; 8. "Puttin' on the Ritz" (Irving Berlin) – 1:52; 9. "How Long Has This Been Going On?" (G. Gershwin, I. Gershwin) – 4:56; 10. "Just You, Just Me" (Jesse Greer, Raymond Klages) – 1:21; 11. "The Man That Got Away" (Arlen, I. Gershwin) – 4:28; 12. "San Francisco" (Walter Jurmann, Gus Kahn, Bronislaw Kaper) – 4:58; 13. "That's Entertainment!" (Dietz, Schwartz) – 4:20; 14. "I Can't Give You Anything but Love" (Dorothy Fields, Jimmy McHugh) – 7:40; 15. "Come Rain or Come Shine" (Arlen, Johnny Mercer) – 4:27; 16. "You're Nearer" (Rodgers, Hart) – 2:00; 17. "A Foggy Day" (G. Gershwin, I. Gershwin) – 3:16; 18. "If Love Were All" (Noël Coward) – 2:43; 19. "Zing! Went the Strings of My Heart" – (J. F. Hanely) – 4:04; 20. "Stormy Weather" (Arlen, Ted Koehler) – 5:44 (performed by Martha Wainwright); 21. Medley: "You Made Me Love You" / "For Me and My Gal" / "The Trolley Song" (Joseph McCarthy, James V. Monaco, Roger Edens) / (George W. Meyer, Edgar Leslie, E. Ray Goetz) / (Blane, Martin) – 4:42; 22. "Rock-a-Bye Your Baby with a Dixie Melody" (Sam M. Lewis, Fred Schwartz, Joe Young) – 4:55; 23. "Over the Rainbow" (Arlen, Harburg) – 4:47 – 5:02 (featuring Kate McGarrigle, piano); 24. "Swanee" (Irving Caesar, G. Gershwin) – 1:50; 25. "After You've Gone" (Henry Creamer, Turner Layton) – 4:57 (duet with Lorna Luft); 26. "Chicago" (Fred Fisher) – 4:35; 27. "Get Happy" (Arlen, Koehler) – 4:21; 28. "Hello Bluebird" – 5:12 (performed by Lorna Luft); 29. "Someone to Watch over Me" (G. Gershwin, I. Gershwin) – 4:21 (performed by Martha Wainwright and Kate McGarrigle); 30. "Ev'ry Time We Say Goodbye" (Cole Porter) – 3:13 (featuring Kate McGarrigle, piano); 31. "San Francisco [reprise]" – 6:37; 32. Credits – 0:52

| Milwaukee at Last (2009) |
|---|
1. "This Is Me"; 2. "Release the Stars" (live); 3. "Brooches"; 4. "Going to a Town" (live); 5. "Sanssouci" (live); 6. "Rules and Regulations" (live); 7. "Brooches 2"; 8. "Tulsa" (live); 9. "The Art Teacher" (live); 10. "Brooches 3"; 11. "Tiergarten" (live); 12. "Leaving for Paris No. 2" (live); 13. "Get Up to Dance"; 14. "Between My Legs" (live); 15. "Interval"; 16. "Do I Disappoint You" (live); 17. "A Foggy Day" (live); 18. "If Love Were All" (live); 19. "Nobody's off the Hook" (live); 20. "Beautiful Child" (live); 21. "Not Ready to Love" (live); 22. "Slideshow" (live); 23. "Macushla" (live); 24. "14th Street" (live); 25. "Playing-Out and Changing-Up"; 26. "Coming Out"; 27. "I Don't Know What It Is" (live); 28. "Pretty Things" (live); 29. "La Complainte de la Butte" (live); 30. "Glamming-Up Onstage and Changing Backstage"; 31. "Get Happy" (live); 32. "Gay Messiah" (live); 33. "Credits"; 34. "Grey Gardens" (live); 35. "Verdi: Rehearsing for a Wedding [La traviata / Act 1]"; 36. "Not Ready to Love" (live from Montreux Jazz Festival 2007); 37. "14th Street" (live from Montreux Jazz Festival 2007); 38. "Get Happy" (live from Montreux Jazz Festival 2007)

| Prima Donna: The Making of an Opera |
|---|
1. "Opening"; 2. "The First Workshop"; 3. "The Genesis of Prima Donna"; 4. "Melody"; 5. "Montréal"; 6. "The Insane Rage"; 7. "In It for the Long Run"; 8. "Getting Signed"; 9. "Orchestration"; 10. "Leeds & the Second Workshop"; 11. "The Orchestra"; 12. "Shakespeare in Berlin"; 13. "Countdown to the Premiere"; 14. "Kate & Zebulon"; 15. "Fireworks"

=== Box set albums ===
| Rufus Rarities (2011) |
|---|
1. "Money Song" (original demo)* – 4:58; 2. "Ups and Downs" (rare promo only track) – 3:07; 3. "Red Thread"* – 5:39; 4. "St. James Infirmary"* – 4:22; 5. "London"* – 3:52; 6. "A Bit of You" (rare Japanese bonus track) – 5:00; 7. "Ashes" (original demo)* – 4:37; 8. "In with the Ladies" (rare United Kingdom bonus track) – 3:53; 9. "Miss Otis Regrets"* – 3:22; 10. "Cowboy Song" (iTunes exclusive track) – 3:48; 11. "Patience Is a Virtue" (rare United States bonus track) – 4:14; 12. "Shoes"* – 3:13; 13. "Fame into Love into Death"* – 3:58; 14. "One More Chance"* – 5:22; 15. "Hankering"* – 4:15; 16. "Dreams and Daydreams"* – 5:03

| Rufus at the Movies (2011) |
|---|
1. "I'm a Running" (from Tommy Tricker and the Stamp Traveller)* – 2:28; 2. "Le Roi d'Ys" (from The Myth of Fingerprints) – 3:19; 3. "On the Banks of the Wabash" (from The Myth of Fingerprints) – 4:35; 4. "Instant Pleasure" (from Big Daddy) – 3:44; 5. "Complainte de la butte" (from Moulin Rouge!) – 3:06; 6. "Hallelujah" (from Shrek) – 4:09; 7. "He Ain't Heavy, He's My Brother" (from Zoolander) – 4:42; 8. "Across the Universe" (from I Am Sam) – 4:08; 9. "It's Only a Paper Moon" (from Stormy Weather) – 4:43; 10. "I Wonder What Became of Me" (from Stormy Weather) – 3:37; 11. "I Eat Dinner (When the Hunger's Gone)" (from Bridget Jones: The Edge of Reason) – 5:39; 12. "I'll Build a Stairway to Paradise" (from The Aviator) – 3:12; 13. "King of the Road" (from Brokeback Mountain) – 2:52; 14. "The Maker Makes" (from Brokeback Mountain) – 3:51; 15. "Bewitched, Bothered and Bewildered" (from The History Boys) – 5:22; 16. "Another Believer" (from Meet the Robinsons) – 4:39

| Rufus Family and Friends (2011) |
|---|
1. "What'll I Do" (with Kate & Anna McGarrigle and Martha Wainwright, from The McGarrigle Hour) – 3:37; 2. "Au Fond du Temple Saint" (with David Byrne, from Grown Backwards) – 4:50; 3. "So Easy" (with Teddy Thompson, from Teddy Thompson) – 4:02; 4. "Old Paint" (with Loudon Wainwright III) – 2:44; 5. "Casanova in Hell" (with Pet Shop Boys, from Concrete) – 3:19; 6. "What Can I Do?" (with Antony and the Johnsons, from I Am a Bird Now) – 1:40; 7. "To America" (with Joan as Police Woman, from To Survive) – 5:42; 8. "Tired of Wasting Time" (with Sloan Wainwright, from Life Grows Back) – 1:44; 9. "Chelsea Hotel, No. 2" (live, from Leonard Cohen: I'm Your Man) – 3:40; 10. "Everybody Knows" (live, from Leonard Cohen: I'm Your Man) – 4:25; 11. "More Wine" (with Julianna Raye, from Restless Night) – 5:03; 12. "Lowlands Away" (with Kate McGarrigle, from Rogue's Gallery: Pirate Ballads, Sea Songs, and Chanteys) – 3:26; 13. "Scarecrow" (with Kristian Hoffman, from &) – 7:00; 14. "Albatross" (from Born to the Breed: A Tribute to Judy Collins) – 5:14; 15. "Down Where the Drunkards Roll" (with Loudon Wainwright III)* – 3:32

| Rufus Original Demos (2011) |
|---|
1. "Foolish Love" (original demo)* – 5:13; 2. "Danny Boy" (original demo)* – 5:02; 3. "Beauty Mark" (original demo)* – 2:07; 4. "Damned Ladies" (original demo)* – 3:40; 5. "Liberty Cabbage" (original demo)* – 3:38; 6. "Matineé Idol" (original demo)* – 3:19; 7. "April Fools" (original demo)* – 3:03; 8. "Get Out of Town" (original demo)* – 2:17; 9. "Sally Ann" (original demo)* – 3:17; 10. "Sweet Repose" (original demo)* – 3:11; 11. "In My Arms" (original demo)* – 3:38; 12. "Keep Cool Fool" (original demo)* – 3:22

(*) designates previously unreleased material

Track listings adapted from AllMusic, Hive magazine and Universal Music.
