= Milwaukee at Last!!! =

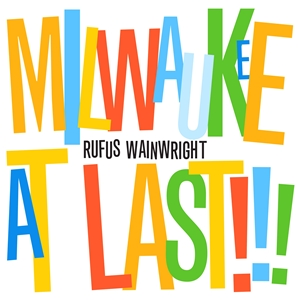

Live album by Rufus Wainwright
- Released: September 22, 2009
- Recorded: August 27, 2007
- Venues: Pabst Theater in Milwaukee, Wisconsin
- Label: Decca
- Producers: Bradley Kaplan; Barry Taylor; Paula Quijano; George Scott

Rufus Wainwright chronology
Rufus Does Judy at Carnegie Hall (2007)	Milwaukee at Last!!! (2009)	All Days Are Nights: Songs for Lulu (2010)

Alternative cover
- Deluxe edition

Milwaukee at Last!!! is the seventh album (and second live album) by Canadian-American singer-songwriter Rufus Wainwright, released in the United States on September 22, 2009. The album consists of live recordings from his August 27, 2007, performance at the Pabst Theater in Milwaukee, Wisconsin in support of his previous studio album, Release the Stars (2007). Documentary film director Albert Maysles recorded a film of the same name for DVD, also released on September 22 in the US.

== Development ==
Following Release the Stars, Wainwright embarked on a world tour that lasted from May 2007 to February 2008 and covered North America, Europe, Japan and Australia/New Zealand. Believing he found the right backing band and that his voice was on a "solid plateau", Wainwright had the August 27, 2007, concert at the Pabst Theater recorded. Wainwright met documentarian Albert Maysles through their mutual friend Sean Lennon, and Maysles said he was "ready, willing and available" to assist with the project. In a September 2009 interview, Wainwright stated his reason for recording the concert in Milwaukee:

I'm in love with that theater, the Pabst Theater. It used to be the center of opera for the Midwest; it's this beautiful opera house in the middle of a cornfield. And I love midwestern audiences. They're so appreciative, and they're not so jaded, and they're real.

== Critical reception ==
Professional ratings
Aggregate scores
Source	Rating
Metacritic	73
Review scores
Source	Rating
AllMusic	4/5 stars
The Buffalo News	3.5/4 stars
MusicOMH	2/5 stars
NME	7/10
Pitchfork	7.2/10
PopMatters	8/10

Overall, reception of the album was positive. AllMusic's Matt Collar wrote that Milwaukee at Last!!! was reminiscent of the "opera-esque aspirations" of Wainwright's previous studio album Release the Stars, with the best material from that album being delivered in a "timely, dramatic fashion that makes for a well-paced listen". Collar complimented the album, stating it showcased Wainwright as a showman and a "deeply creative songwriter with a superb knack for live performance". In his review for the St. Petersburg Times, Sean Daly commended Wainwright's performance of "Release the Stars", claiming he "swoons like a besotted cabaret star on the eve of retirement". Gary Flockhart of The Scotsman called the album "slightly cheesy", but "brilliantly over-the-top" and "definitely another good album from the preening prima donna".

Pitchfork's Stephen Deusner claimed that the DVD was the "better way to experience Wainwright live", as visuals are crucial. Deusner calls the setlist featured in the film "more well-rounded and revealing", with less ponderous tracks like "Between My Legs", "Do I Disappoint You" and "The Art Teacher".

== Track listing ==
All songs written by Wainwright, unless otherwise noted.

CD

1. "Release the Stars" – 5:54
2. "Going to a Town" – 4:13
3. "Sanssouci" – 5:49
4. "Rules and Regulations" – 4:10
5. "Leaving for Paris No. 2" – 6:04
6. "If Love Were All" (Noël Coward) – 2:26
7. "Nobody's Off the Hook" – 4:26
8. "Not Ready to Love" / "Slideshow" – 13:51
9. "Macushla" (Dermot MacMurrough, Josephine V. Rowe) – 3:51
10. "Gay Messiah" – 4:06

Amazon.com bonus track

11. "I Don't Know What It Is" – 5:01

US iTunes bonus track

11. "The Art Teacher" – 4:04

DVD

1. "Release the Stars"
2. "Going to a Town"
3. "Sanssouci"
4. "Rules and Regulations"
5. "Tulsa"
6. "The Art Teacher"
7. "Tiergarten"
8. "Leaving for Paris No. 2"
9. "Between My Legs"
10. "Do I Disappoint You?"
11. "A Foggy Day" (George Gershwin, Ira Gershwin)
12. "If Love Were All" (Noël Coward)
13. "Nobody's off the Hook"
14. "Beautiful Child"
15. "Not Ready to Love"
16. "Slideshow"
17. "Macushla" (Dermot MacMurrough, Josephine V. Rowe)
18. "14th Street"
19. "I Don't Know What It Is"
20. "Pretty Things"
21. "Complainte de la Butte" (Georges Van Parys, Jean Renoir)
22. "Get Happy" (Harold Arlen, Ted Koehler)
23. "Gay Messiah"

== Personnel ==
- C.J. Camerieri – trumpet, piccolo trumpet, flugelhorn, backing vocals
- Jeff Hill – upright bass, electrical bass, backing vocals
- Matt Johnson – drums, bass, backing vocals
- Mycle Konopka – engineer
- Alex Lake – photography
- Gerry Leonard – guitar, backing vocals, music director
- Ali McMordie – tour manager
- Laura Mueller – staff
- Julian Peploe – art direction
- Jack Petruzzelli – guitar, piano, banjo, bass, backing vocals
- Dave Phee – backline technician
- Tom Schick – mixing
- Louis Schwadron – French horn, backing vocals
- Ian Shea – assistant
- Ryan J-W Smith – mastering
- Will Vinson – tenor saxophone, soprano saxophone, flute, piano, recorder, backing vocals
- Rufus Wainwright – vocals, piano, guitar, art direction
- Michael Ways – engineer

== Release history ==
Milwaukee at Last!!! was released in a CD format on September 7 in Canada, Denmark, France, Sweden, and the United Kingdom, on September 8 in Singapore and Spain, on September 11 in Germany, and on September 22 in Italy, Japan, and the United States. In the United States, the album was released digitally on September 8, with the DVD and deluxe CD/DVD combo also being released on September 22. In the United Kingdom, a deluxe box set was released as a "luxury fan edition" with the CD, DVD and four postcards.
