= 40 Odd Years =

Box set by Loudon Wainwright III
- Released: May 3, 2011
- Label: Shout! Factory

40 Odd Years is a compilation box set by American singer-songwriter Loudon Wainwright III, released on May 3, 2011 on Shout! Factory. The set contains music from throughout Wainwright's career, alongside a DVD of live performances and documentary pieces. The collection is co-produced and curated by filmmaker Judd Apatow, who also writes an introduction in the liner notes.

The album's fourth disc features both rare and unreleased tracks, including a newly recorded song for the collection, entitled "Dead Man".

== Background ==
Regarding filmmaker Judd Apatow's involvement in 40 Odd Years, Wainwright noted, "I would see him and he would say, "You gotta have a box!" And I'd say, "Yeah, sure, I agree." But because of his interest and his influence, he was able get together with the people at Shout! Factory and encouraged them to make it happen. And he was also quite involved from the creative side of things. I sent him my choices, and the DVD was pretty much created by him and his team. So, he's a very big part."

Regarding the box set's track listing, Wainwright stated, "I've mourned over the kittens that have been put in the sack, that didn't make it into the box. That was an aspect that was difficult at that stage - choosing what could be included and what couldn't be included because there were digital space requirements. [...] I took one song off because it made my wife wince too much. I cut her some slack. It takes a lot to make me wince; as far as I'm concerned, bad taste is timeless. I like to wince. I like to think that people are going 'Eeeghegh!' I put one song on there that I never had the guts to put on a record - which was this song called "Laid" - so I thought, 'What the hell? I'm almost dead. I'll put it out there'."

On the album's fourth disc of rarities, Wainwright included a duet with him and his ex-wife Kate McGarrigle, entitled "Weave Room Blues". Wainwright stated, "It seemed important to include something with the two of us: "Weave Room Blues' was the choice. [...] We were having a lot of fun. And that was what I wanted to convey with that choice, that we did have fun."

== Track listing ==
=== Disc 1 (1969–1983) ===
1. School Days
2. I Don't Care
3. Uptown
4. Be Careful There's A Baby In The House
5. Saw Your Name In The Paper
6. Dead Skunk
7. New Paint
8. Drinking Song
9. The Swimming Song
10. Dilated To Meet You
11. Down Drinking At The Bar
12. The Man Who Couldn't Cry
13. Whatever Happened To Us?
14. Crime Of Passion
15. Kick In The Head
16. Summer's Almost Over
17. Just Like President Thieu
18. Golfin’ Blues
19. The Heckler
20. Natural Disaster
21. Red Guitar
22. Hollywood Hopeful
23. DTTYWLM
24. The Grammy Song

=== Disc 2 (1984–1995) ===
1. Westchester County
2. I'm Alright
3. Screaming Issue
4. Unhappy Anniversary
5. Your Mother And I
6. Synchronicity
7. Hard Day On The Planet
8. You Don't Want To Know
9. Bill Of Goods
10. Thanksgiving
11. Your Father's Car
12. When I'm At Your House
13. The Picture
14. Men
15. So Many Songs
16. Tip That Waitress
17. I'd Rather Be Lonely
18. April Fool's Day Morn
19. The Acid Song
20. IWIWAL
21. A Year
22. Dreaming

=== Disc 3 (1996–2010) ===
1. So Damn Happy
2. Primrose Hill
3. Bein’ A Dad
4. Four Mirrors
5. It's Love And I Hate It
6. Christmas Morning
7. Pretty Good Day
8. White Winos
9. Bed
10. Surviving Twin
11. The Shit Song
12. Between
13. My Biggest Fan
14. When You Leave
15. Make Your Mother Mad
16. Daughter
17. Grey In L.A.
18. Muse Blues
19. Motel Blues
20. The Deal
21. Rowena
22. High Wide & Handsome

=== Disc 4 (Rare and Unreleased) ===
1. Weave Room Blues (with Kate McGarrigle)
2. McSorley's
3. Black Uncle Remus (demo)
4. Funny Having Money
5. The Hardy Boys At The Y (with The Boys Of The Lough)
6. Laid (live)
7. Outsidey (live)
8. That Cat
9. Surfin’ Queen (demo)
10. Newt
11. 4X10 (live)
12. Somethin’ Stupid (with Barry Humphries)
13. The Miles (live)
14. So Good So Far (live)
15. Big Fish
16. No Sure Way
17. Hey There 2nd Grader
18. More I Cannot Wish You
19. Florida (Lucky You)
20. Hank & Fred (live)
21. Your Eyes (demo)
22. Dead Man
23. At The End Of A Long Lonely Day (with Suzzy Roche)

=== Disc 5 (DVD: Filmed Performances) ===
1. One Man Guy - 1993 Dutch television documentary
2. BBC4 Sessions: Loudon Wainwright: One Man Guy - Filmed at Bush Hall, London, on May 2, 2005 - 4 Song
3. Loudon Wainwright III at The BBC - Aired on September 23, 2005 - 11 Songs
4. Dead Man - Filmed on May 24, 2010; recording session documentary
5. Entertainment Desk - Aired on Canadian television in 1995 - 1 Song with Martha Wainwright
6. High Wide & Handsome – The Charlie Poole Project - Filmed in 2009 for documentary on making of album
7. The Basement - Filmed in Sydney, Australia in 2008 - 1 Song with Lucy Wainwright Roche
8. Austin City Limits - 5 Songs
9. Saturday Night Live - Aired on NBC on November 15, 1975 - 2 Songs
10. The Garfield House - Filmed on May 24, 2010 - 6 Songs
11. 826LA Benefit - Filmed on January 16, 2007 - 2 Songs
12. PBS Soundstage - Aired on February 2, 1977 - 1 Song
13. McCabe's Guitar Shop - Filmed on February 3, 2007 - 1 Song
14. The Mike Douglas Show - Aired on April 25, 1978 - Interview and 1 Song
15. Nightline - Aired on ABC on June 22, 2005 - 1 Song
16. Carrott Confidential - Aired on BBC on February 14, 1987 - 1 Song
