= If Love Were All =

Song composed by Noël Coward performed by Judy Garland

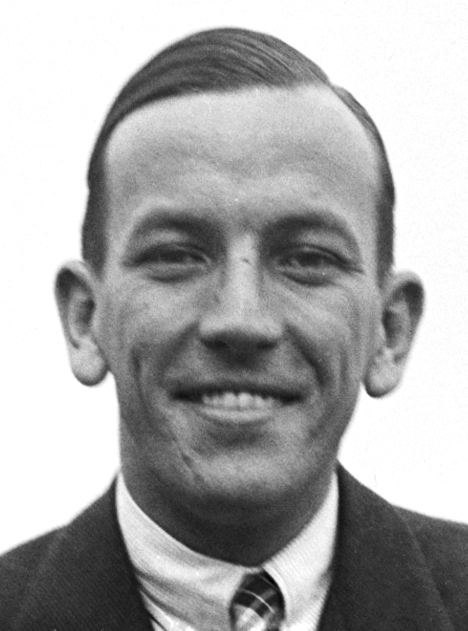
Noël Coward in 1925

"If Love Were All" is a song by Noël Coward, published in 1929 and written for the operetta Bitter Sweet. The song is considered autobiographical, and has been described as "self-deprecating" as well as "one of the loneliest pop songs ever written".

Ivy St. Helier introduced the song on stage and also performed it in the 1933 film version of Bitter Sweet.

In June 2009, an Off-Broadway play of the same name about Coward's relationship with Gertrude Lawrence premiered at Lucille Lortel Theatre in New York City.

== Reception ==
"If Love Were All" has been described as "self-deprecating" as well as "one of the loneliest pop songs ever written". Rod McKuen considers the song to be among the "truly great" songs about "entertaining from the entertainment point of view".

== Cover versions ==
Cover versions appear on Judy Garland's Judy at Carnegie Hall (1961), as a B-side to Pet Shop Boys' "Yesterday, When I Was Mad" single and on the album Alternative (1995), Rufus Wainwright's Rufus Does Judy at Carnegie Hall (2007) and Milwaukee at Last!!! (2009), and also on Sarah Brightman's The Songs That Got Away (1989). In the latter part of her life, Garland often included "If Love Were All" in her concert and television repertoire.

Other notable recordings:

- Alma Cogan - for her album How About Love (1962).
- Elaine Stritch - sung in her one woman show, 'Elaine Stritch: At Liberty'
- Johnny Mathis - included in his UK album The Sweetheart Tree (1965)
- Julie Andrews - for the album Broadway's Fair Julie (1961).
- Joyce Grenfell - included in the album The Words and Music of Noël Coward (1965).
- Maria Friedman
- Shirley Bassey - for her album 12 of Those Songs (1968).

== See also ==
- Cultural impact of Noël Coward
