= Tiergarten (song) =

Single by Rufus Wainwright

from the album Release the Stars
- Released: October 2007
- Genre: Baroque pop
- Length: 3:26
- Label: Geffen
- Songwriter(s): Rufus Wainwright
- Producer(s): Rufus Wainwright

Rufus Wainwright singles chronology
"Rules and Regulations" (2007)	"Tiergarten" (2007)

Release the Stars track listing
- 1. "Do I Disappoint You"; 2. "Going to a Town"; 3. "Tiergarten"; 4. "Nobody's Off the Hook"; 5. "Between My Legs"; 6. "Rules and Regulations"; 7. "Not Ready to Love"; 8. "Slideshow"; 9. "Tulsa"; 10. "Leaving for Paris No. 2"; 11. "Sanssouci"; 12. "Release the Stars"

"Tiergarten" is a song written and performed by Canadian-American singer-songwriter Rufus Wainwright. Released in October 2007, it was the third single from Wainwright's fifth studio album, Release the Stars. A limited edition (500 copies) 12" vinyl single containing "Supermayer Lost in Tiergarten" was released on October 27. A one-track EP also containing the Supermayer remix was released in the UK through iTunes and 7digital on October 29.

Both the album version and remix of "Tiergarten" failed to chart in any country despite the success of Release the Stars. The remix also appears on the eleventh installment of the Chillout Sessions compilation series.

== Track listing ==
=== 12" vinyl single ===
1. "Supermayer Lost in Tiergarten"

=== Tiergarten EP ===
1. "Supermayer Lost in Tiergarten" (remix by Superpitcher & Michael Mayer)

== Personnel ==
- Rufus Wainwright – vocals, piano, percussion
- Jason Boshoff – programming
- Marius de Vries – programming, breathing
- Jeff Hill – bass
- Matt Johnson – drums
- Gerry Leonard – electric guitar
- Ronith Mues – harp
- Jenni Muldaur – backing vocals
- Tom Stephan – additional programming
- Neil Tennant – backing vocals, breathing
- Richard Thompson – acoustic guitar
- Teddy Thompson – backing vocals

== Other appearances ==
- Chillout Sessions XI (2008, Ministry of Sound) – "Supermayer Lost in Tiergarten"
