= Rules and Regulations (song) =

Single by Rufus Wainwright

from the album Release the Stars
- Released: July 30, 2007 (UK)
- Genre: Baroque pop, pop
- Length: 4:05
- Label: Geffen
- Songwriter(s): Rufus Wainwright
- Producer(s): Rufus Wainwright

Rufus Wainwright singles chronology
"Going to a Town" (2007)	"Rules and Regulations" (2007)	"Tiergarten" (2007)

Release the Stars track listing
- 1. "Do I Disappoint You"; 2. "Going to a Town"; 3. "Tiergarten"; 4. "Nobody's Off the Hook"; 5. "Between My Legs"; 6. "Rules and Regulations"; 7. "Not Ready to Love"; 8. "Slideshow"; 9. "Tulsa"; 10. "Leaving for Paris No. 2"; 11. "Sanssouci"; 12. "Release the Stars"

"Rules and Regulations" is a song written and performed by Canadian-American singer-songwriter Rufus Wainwright. It was the second single from Wainwright's fifth studio album, Release the Stars, released digitally via iTunes in the UK on July 30, 2007.

Despite the success of Release the Stars, which reached No. 2 on the UK Albums Chart, and the performance of "Going to a Town", the first single from the album that reached #54 on the UK Singles Chart, "Rules and Regulations" failed to chart in any nation. A music video, directed by Petro Papahadjopoulos, was also created to promote the single.

== Track listing ==
=== UK digital single ===
1. "Rules and Regulations"

== Personnel ==
- Rufus Wainwright – vocals, acoustic guitar, horn arrangement
- Carl Albach – trumpet, piccolo trumpet
- Steven Bernstein – trumpet, conducting
- Jason Boshoff – programming
- John Chudoba – trumpet
- Marius de Vries – programming
- Dominic Derasse – trumpet, piccolo trumpet
- Rachelle Garniez – claviola, accordion
- Jeff Hill – electric bass, upright bass
- Matt Johnson – drums, recorder
- Gerry Leonard – guitar
- Dan Levine – trombone
- Larry Mullins – shaker, tambourine, tabla, woodblock, fish
- Jack Petruzelli – acoustic guitar
- Neil Tennant – backing vocals, synthesizer
- Dave Trigg – trumpet, piccolo trumpet

== Music video ==
Petro Papahadjopoulos directed the music video for "Rules and Regulations", which features a group of men performing a choreographed dance around a long john-wearing Wainwright inside a London mansion.
