= Going to a Town =

2007 single by Rufus Wainwright

Single by Rufus Wainwright

from the album Release the Stars
- Released: April 3, 2007
- Length: 4:06
- Label: Geffen
- Songwriter: Rufus Wainwright
- Producer: Rufus Wainwright

Rufus Wainwright singles chronology
"Hallelujah" (2007)	"Going to a Town" (2007)	"Rules and Regulations" (2007)

Release the Stars track listing
- 1. "Do I Disappoint You"; 2. "Going to a Town"; 3. "Tiergarten"; 4. "Nobody's Off the Hook"; 5. "Between My Legs"; 6. "Rules and Regulations"; 7. "Not Ready to Love"; 8. "Slideshow"; 9. "Tulsa"; 10. "Leaving for Paris N° 2"; 11. "Sanssouci"; 12. "Release the Stars"

"Going to a Town" is a song written and performed by Canadian-American singer-songwriter Rufus Wainwright. It was the first single from the album Release the Stars, released on April 3, 2007, in the United States and on May 7 in the United Kingdom.

A new version of the song featuring singer Anohni was included on Wainwright's 2023 album Folkocracy.

== Music video ==
The music video for the song was directed by Sophie Muller, who also directed Wainwright's first music video ("April Fools"). The video premiered in April 2007, and Logo aired a 20-minute feature on the making of the video on April 27, 2007 (Making the Video: Going to a Town). The video begins with Wainwright as a D.H. Lawrence-like character, sitting alone at a table in an isolated room. As the video progresses, a large bouquet of roses appears and viewers see Wainwright with a bed cot. Three women emerge, dressed in black clothing and veils, visibly mourning the loss of their husbands. At times, their presence is abstract, digitally projected as if they exist only in Wainwright's character's mind. Other times, Wainwright is physically interacting with them within the same room.

Viewers then see images of the roses burning, the women crying, and catching Wainwright as he falls to the ground. With light cast upon him from a single window, they place a laurel wreath on his head. As his arms are spread out and straight across, and light is cast upon him as if by divine intervention, this image is clearly meant to symbolize a crucifixion.

In Making the Video, Wainwright discusses the various images and elements depicted in the music video. He states the song is "an emotional reaction to a lover you had a fight with", and is about "mourning" and "moving on to bigger and better things." The three women in the video represent three widows, an element he took from Mozart's The Magic Flute. One woman represents Jacqueline Kennedy Onassis, another Frida Kahlo, and the third a more abstract, "fairy tale-like" woman from The Magic Flute. Later in the interview, Wainwright states the women represent The Three Graces. He claims the burning roses symbolize "purification by fire", representing the United States--"beautiful, but thorny." Admitting "Going to a Town" is more about birth than destruction, he believes Americans (at the time the video was made) need to "change things" and "make sacrifices". The laurel wreath, he says, also represents the US, which "dominates the planet but is in peril of losing democracy."

In the video, Wainwright wears a suit created by American fashion designer Marc Jacobs.

== Track listing ==
US digital single

1. "Going to a Town"

UK digital single

1. "Going to a Town"
2. "Low Grade Happiness"

== Chart performance ==
In the UK, "Going to a Town" entered the UK Singles Chart on May 5, 2007, at number 68. The following week (May 26), the track reached its highest position at number 54. "Going to a Town" lasted on the chart for two weeks total, and failed to chart in any other countries.

Chart (2008)	Peak position
UK Singles (OCC)	54

== Personnel ==
- Rufus Wainwright – vocals, piano, string arrangement
- David Adorjan – cello
- Gabriel Adorjan – violin
- Ozan Cakar – French horn
- Florian Dorpholz – trumpet
- Jason Hart – organ
- Jeff Hill – upright bass
- Matt Johnson – drums
- Raphael Mentzen – trumpet
- Larry Mullins – shaker, triangle, marimba
- Jack Petruzelli – banjo
- Julianna Raye – backing vocals
- Rachel Rilling – violin
- Lucy Roche – backing vocals
- Raphael Sachs – viola
- Richard Thompson – electric guitar
- Joan Wasser – backing vocals, violin

== Other appearances ==
- Live at KEXP – Volume Four (2008)
- In the end credits of Tom at the Farm

== George Michael version ==
"Going to a Town"

Promotional single by George Michael

from the album Symphonica
- Released: April 7, 2014
- Length: 4:45 (album version); 4:15 (radio edit)
- Label: Aegean
- Songwriter: Rufus Wainwright
- Producers: George Michael; Phil Ramone

George Michael singles chronology
"Let Her Down Easy" (2014)	"Going to a Town" (2014)	"Feeling Good" (2014)

Music video
- "Going to a Town" on YouTube

George Michael performed "Going to a Town" during his 2011–12 Symphonica Tour and included it on the deluxe edition of his Symphonica album in 2014. "Going to a Town" was sent to radio on April 7, 2014, and the music video for the song was released on April 15, 2014.

=== Track listing ===
- Promotional single
1. "Going to a Town" (radio edit) – 4:15
2. "Going to a Town" (album version) – 4:45

=== Release history ===
Country	Date	Format	Label	Ref.
Various	April 7, 2014	Contemporary hit radio	Aegean	

== Other cover versions ==
- Salma Hayek, as performed in the film soundtrack for Americano
- Mandy Patinkin, on his album Diary: January 27, 2018, produced by Thomas Bartlett (substituting "Jerusalem" for "America" in the lyric).
