= Rufus Does Judy at Carnegie Hall =

2007 live album by Rufus Wainwright

Live album by Rufus Wainwright
- Released: December 4, 2007
- Recorded: June 14–15, 2006
- Venues: Stern Auditorium/Perelman Stage, Carnegie Hall, New York City
- Label: Geffen
- Producer: Phil Ramone

Rufus Wainwright chronology
Release the Stars (2007)	Rufus Does Judy at Carnegie Hall (2007)	Milwaukee at Last!!! (2009)

Rufus Does Judy at Carnegie Hall is the sixth album (and first live album) by the Canadian-American singer-songwriter Rufus Wainwright, released through Geffen Records in December 2007. The album consists of live recordings from his sold-out June 14–15, 2006, tribute concerts at Carnegie Hall to the American actress and singer Judy Garland. Backed by a 36-piece orchestra conducted by Stephen Oremus, Wainwright recreated Garland's April 23, 1961, concert, often considered "the greatest night in show business history". Garland's 1961 double album, Judy at Carnegie Hall, a comeback performance with more than 25 American pop and jazz standards, was highly successful, initially spending 95 weeks on the Billboard charts and garnering five Grammy Awards (including Album of the Year, Best Album Cover, Best Solo Vocal Performance – Female and Best Engineering Contribution – Popular Recording).

For his album, Wainwright was also recognized by the Grammy Awards, earning a 2009 nomination for Best Traditional Pop Vocal Album. While the tribute concerts were popular and the album was well received by critics, album sales were limited. Rufus Does Judy at Carnegie Hall managed to chart in three nations, peaking at number 84 in Belgium, number 88 in the Netherlands and number 171 on the United States' Billboard 200.

Guests on the album include Wainwright's sister Martha Wainwright ("Stormy Weather"), his mother Kate McGarrigle (piano, "Over the Rainbow"), along with one of Garland's daughters, Lorna Luft ("After You've Gone"). Related to the album, the February 25, 2007 tribute concert filmed at the London Palladium was released on DVD as Rufus! Rufus! Rufus! Does Judy! Judy! Judy!: Live from the London Palladium on December 4, 2007.

== Conception and development ==
According to Pitchfork, Wainwright "started listening to the Carnegie Hall album in the weeks and months after September 11, craving some cheap showbiz cheer, but wound up discovering something deeper". The subsequent war on terrorism and invasion of Iraq caused Wainwright to become "traumatized and disillusioned with anything American". Claiming he was reminded of how great "the US used to be", Wainwright said the following of his appreciation for the album during that turbulent time in American history:

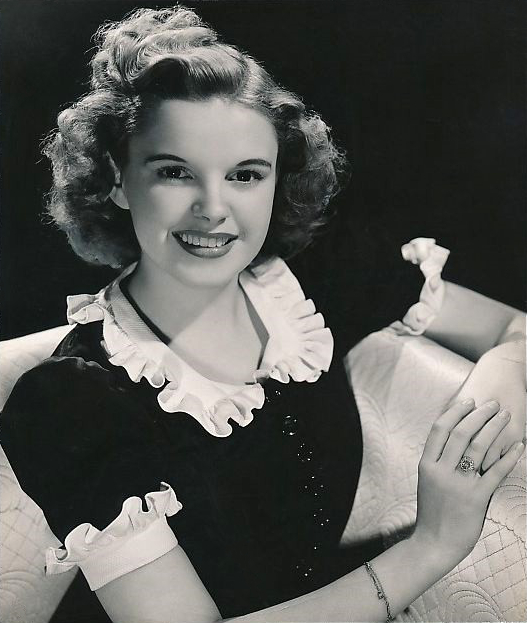
The recordings of Judy Garland helped Wainwright to emotionally process the terrorist attacks on September 11, 2001.

Somehow that album, no matter how dark things seemed, made everything brighten. She had this capacity to lighten the world through the innocence of her sound. Her anchor to the material was obviously through her devotion to music. You never feel that she didn't believe every word of every song she ever sang.

I find the political and socioeconomic environment we live in very oppressive and very worrying, but every time I put on that live album, I was immediately put in a better mood. I was given a sense of hope and a sense of escape, only because so much of modern-day culture and radio—and what's prized by our society—is so empty. And then of course I would sing along.

Wainwright observed while driving in his car that "it [would] be funny to redo this as a song cycle". Soon afterwards, he took the idea to New York-based theatrical producer Jared Geller (who would later co-produce the tribute concert with David Foster), hoping to turn a dream into a reality. Geller initially thought the idea was "insane", but he and Wainwright continued discussing options. Eventually, Geller agreed to assist with the production and the two found space in Wainwright's schedule to book Carnegie Hall a year in advance. Once the venue was booked, staging elements such as lighting, microphone location and amplification were discussed. Stephen Oremus signed on as the conductor of the 36-piece orchestra and Phil Ramone took charge of the recording. Rehearsals began in April 2006, and while it would have been easier to practice in rehearsal rooms, large theaters such as the Lynch at the John Jay College of Criminal Justice and the Museum of Jewish Heritage were utilized because "Rufus wanted a feel for performing this material on a stage". As a result of financial restrictions, full orchestra rehearsals took place only two days before the show and the day of each performance (practice with smaller groups of instruments began a few months before the concerts).

== Tribute concerts ==
Due to popular demand, Wainwright's tribute was performed a total of six times. After tickets for the first show (June 14, 2006 at Carnegie Hall in New York City) sold out, a second show was added at the same venue for the following night (June 15). Increased demand resulted in three concerts in Europe: February 18, 2007 at the London Palladium in London, February 20 at L'Olympia in Paris and February 25 once again at the London Palladium. The final performance was on September 23, 2007 at the Hollywood Bowl in Los Angeles, California.

=== Promotion, celebrity participation ===
Part of the success of the tribute concerts can be attributed to the amount of press attention received and the eagerness of other artists to participate in the event. As written by Gaby Wood of The Guardian, Wainwright "sparkled on the cover of Time Out New York" and was "adored in the pages of The New York Times" following the Carnegie Hall shows.

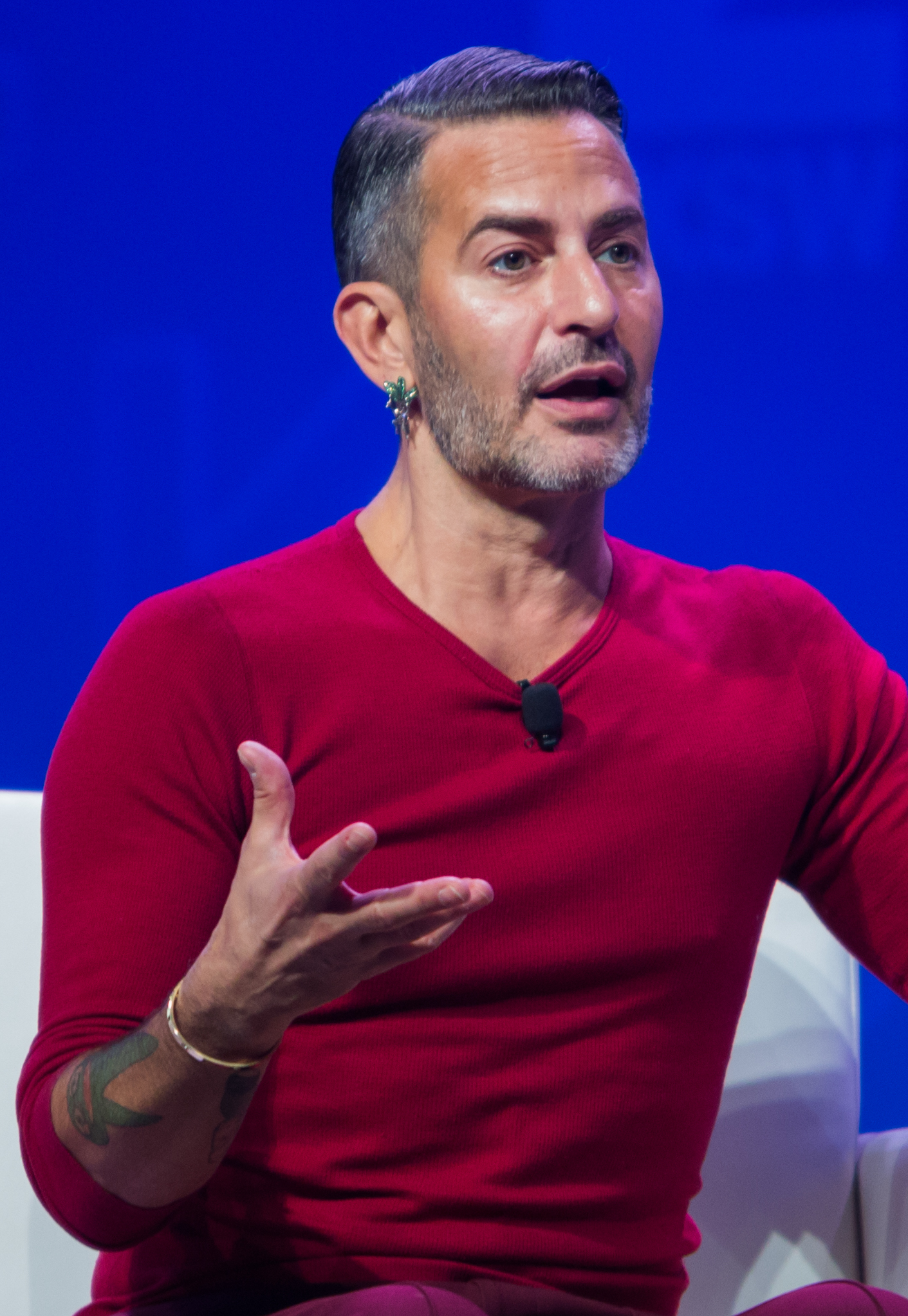
Marc Jacobs (pictured in 2017) promoted the concerts in his Greenwich Village store and attended a Carnegie Hall performance.

In fashion designer Marc Jacobs' menswear boutique in Greenwich Village, "virtually nothing was for sale except T-shirts advertising the show" (the bright orange shirts contained the text "RUFUS RUFUS RUFUS" and "world's greatest entertainer", mimicking promotional material used for Garland 45 years earlier). Film director Sam Mendes planned to create a documentary about Wainwright's re-creation and the work leading up to it, though the project fell through.

Dutch designers Viktor & Rolf outfitted Wainwright and his family members for the concerts. To return the favor Wainwright wrote the song "Ode to Antidote" and allowed its use in the promotion of the design duo's cologne, "Antidote". He also helped premiere the cologne at the after-party for his first Garland tribute and later performed "Over the Rainbow" at the premiere of their Spring 2007 fashion line. Wainwright wore clothing by Tom Ford at the Hollywood Bowl concert.

To promote the album, Wainwright's website linked to an online store where fans could purchase merchandise, including several shirt designs, concert posters, programs and other collectibles. Like the shirts sold by Marc Jacobs, much of the promotional material mimicked posters used for Garland's concert years before.

Celebrities attending the Carnegie Hall shows included Justin Bond ("Kiki" of Kiki and Herb), Patricia Field, Gina Gershon, Joel Grey, Marc Jacobs, Michael Kors, Tony Kushner, Ann Magnuson, Sarah Jessica Parker, Kate Pierson, Fred Schneider, the Proenza Schouler boys, Chloë Sevigny, John Waters and Viktor & Rolf. Famous faces turned out at the concerts in Europe as well, including Julian Barratt, Keane frontman Tom Chaplin, Julia Davis, David Furnish, Mark Gatiss, Richard E. Grant, Jeremy Irons, Lulu, Paul Morley, Siân Phillips, Imogen Stubbs and Teddy Thompson. Celebrities at the Hollywood Bowl show included Jamie Lee Curtis, Jimmy Fallon, Jake Gyllenhaal, Debbie Reynolds and Rod Stewart.

== Music ==
=== Songs ===
The songs on the album are identical to those performed on Garland's 1961 album, Judy at Carnegie Hall, except Wainwright's album included "Get Happy" as a bonus track in the UK and on iTunes in the US. "Hail[ing] from a golden era dotted with trolley cars, Cadillacs, and glitzy jazz clubs", the set list included more than 25 American swing tunes, jazz and pop standards, including two Rodgers and Hart classics ("This Can't Be Love", "You're Nearer"), three from brothers George and Ira Gershwin ("Who Cares? (As Long as You Care for Me)", "How Long Has This Been Going On?" and "A Foggy Day"), two from duo Howard Dietz and Arthur Schwartz ("Alone Together", "That's Entertainment!"), Harold Arlen, Irving Berlin, Noël Coward and more. Wainwright performed the songs nearly identically to Garland, even "flubb[ing]" the lyrics purposely on "You Go to My Head" to mimic the mistake made by Garland years before.

=== Orchestrations ===
Stephen Oremus, musical director for the tribute concerts, faced the task of resurrecting Mort Lindsey's original concert arrangements written for a 36-piece orchestra. Although it is no longer common to have orchestras so large (Oremus acknowledged that even Wicked on Broadway only had 22 pieces), Wainwright and Oremus insisted the full 36-piece ensemble should be utilized to create "as exact a replica as [they could] muster". Some of the well-known arrangements by orchestrators like Nelson Riddle and Conrad Salinger had to be reconstructed, since their music charts were not available, and most of the songs had to be transposed, since Wainwright was performing them in a different key.

== Gay elements ==
Garland was a gay icon, even before Wainwright was born. Gay identification with Garland was being discussed in the mainstream as early as 1967. Time magazine, in reviewing Garland's 1967 Palace Theatre engagement, disparagingly noted that a "disproportionate part of her nightly claque seems to be homosexual". It goes on to say that "[t]he boys in the tight trousers" would "roll their eyes, tear at their hair and practically levitate from their seats" during Garland's performances. Time then attempted to explain Garland's appeal to the homosexual, consulting psychiatrists who opined that "the attraction [to Garland] might be made considerably stronger by the fact that she has survived so many problems; homosexuals identify with that kind of hysteria" and that "Judy was beaten up by life, embattled, and ultimately had to become more masculine. She has the power that homosexuals would like to have, and they attempt to attain it by idolizing her."

Garland always had a large base of fans in the gay community, which includes Wainwright, who identifies as gay and came out to his parents at the age of 14. A connection is frequently drawn between the timing of Garland's death and funeral, in June 1969, and the Stonewall riots, the flashpoint of the modern Gay Liberation movement. Coincidental or not, the proximity of Garland's death to Stonewall has become a part of LGBT history and lore. Wainwright, having been called the "first post-liberation era gay pop star", was obsessed with The Wizard of Oz (1939) as a child and would dress in his mother's gown, "pretend[ing] to be either the Wicked Witch – melting for hours on end – or the Good Witch, depending on his mood". Wainwright also claims his mother (Canadian folk musician Kate McGarrigle) forced him to perform "Over the Rainbow" for guests while growing up, a song he often included in his concert repertoire as an adult.

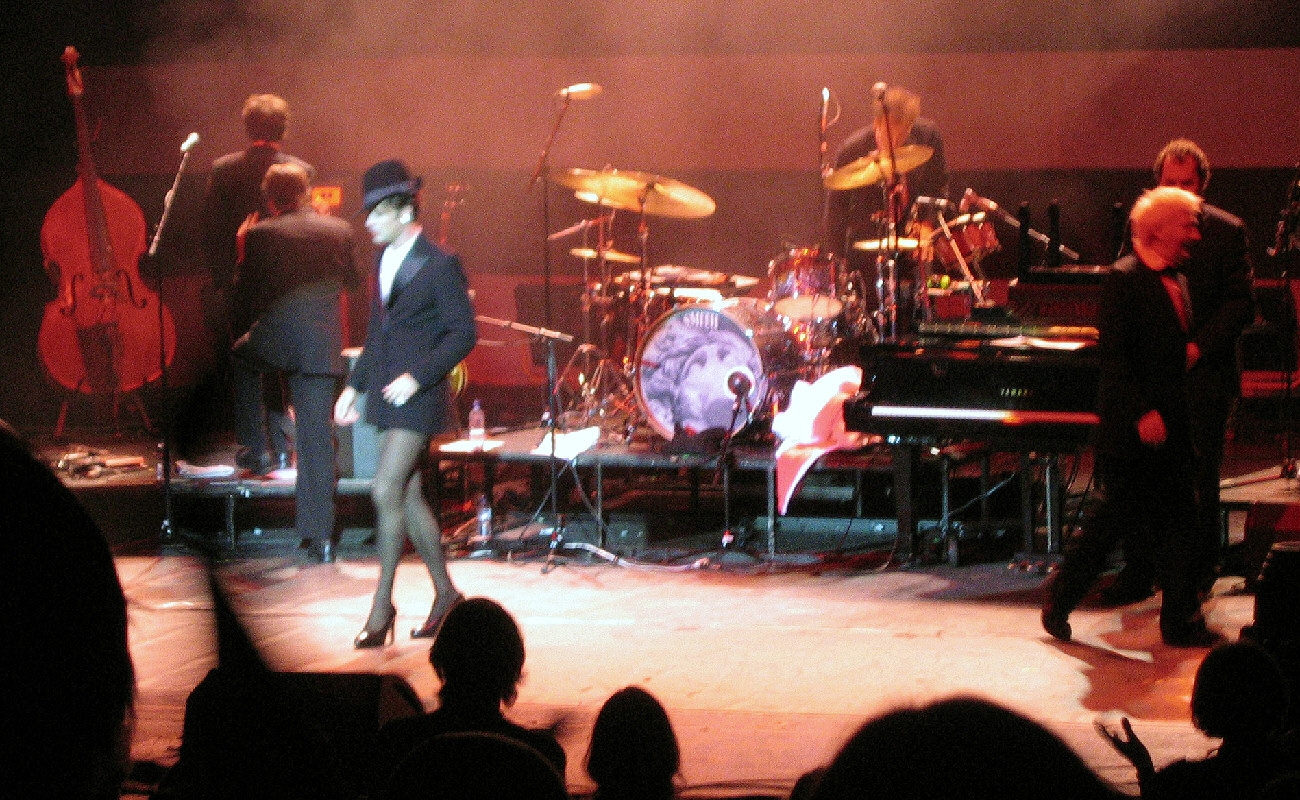
Wainwright, mimicking Judy Garland's appearance in Summer Stock, in 2007

Wainwright never intended to impersonate Garland or create a drag act, but rather to inhabit the songs and expose them to a new generation. However, there was a certain camp style present, of which Wainwright stated the following: "I think that any gay person in the world would be seduced at one point by a certain kind of camp. For certain people it's kind of a saving grace." Regarding the tribute concerts and homosexuality, Wainwright admitted:

I don't think it would have been possible for anyone other than a gay male to do this concert. In a weird way, a gay man has some sort of perspective on it, I believe.

While Wainwright did not dress in drag at any of the tribute shows in New York or Europe, he did return to the stage in "Judy drag" for an encore at the Hollywood Bowl performance, "bedecked in a double-breasted tuxedo jacket sans pants, black stockings, high heels, earrings, lipstick and a tilted fedora". He also took "Get Happy" from the set and performed the tune "Summer Stock"-style during part of his Release the Stars tour to mimic the look of Garland during her performance (pictured on right).

== Critical reception ==
Professional ratings
Aggregate scores
Source	Rating
Metacritic	69
Review scores
Source	Rating
AllMusic	3.5/5 stars
Blender	3.5/5 stars
Entertainment Weekly	B−
The Guardian	4/5 stars
Mojo	3/5 stars
Pitchfork	7.5/10
Rolling Stone	3.5/5 stars
Slant	4/5 stars
The Times	2/5 stars
Uncut	3/5 stars

Overall, reception of the album was positive. Stephen Holden of Blender called Wainwright's tribute "a fabulous stunt in which a gay singer channeled the spirit of the ultimate gay icon", and declared the album was "as good an introduction to the great American songbook as any". Pitchfork Media's Stephen Troussé wrote that Wainwright "elegantly outdoes [Garland] on a couple of the ballads" and also compliments guest performer Martha Wainwright, "who turns in a stunning, showstopping 'Stormy Weather' in an appropriately brazen bid to steal the show". In his review for Rolling Stone, Robert Christgau stated it was "a relief to hear him essay the show tunes and Tin Pan Alley chestnuts of this tribute album". Furthermore, he wrote that the songs "expand [Wainwright's] melodic compass", allowing him to "bring something new to them too – namely, sexuality in the sensuality as opposed to gender-preference sense". Dave Hughes of Slant Magazine had positive comments about the album: "That Wainwright has the temerity to cover such a bona fide classic—and the chops to pull it off without breaking a limb or his brain—speaks both to his ambition and to his prodigious abilities."

The album did receive some criticism. After noting Garland's lifelong attempt to master pitch and articulation, Christgau claimed Wainwright's habit of "slid[ing] past notes and draw[ing] out the final syllables of lines are signatures indistinguishable from tics". Entertainment Weekly's Chris Willman wrote that Wainwright's "delicate upper range is nicely attuned to some of the ballads, but anything that requires belting is pretty much a loss". Mark Edwards of The Times called Wainwright's performance an acquired taste, stating his "trademark delivery" is "lazy and somewhat slurred". Dave Hughes' review pointed out Wainwright's "problem with the brassy high notes in an otherwise energetic take on 'That's Entertainment'", but admits it would be unfair to hold this against him since Garland's live performance was not perfect either. Hughes appropriately notes, "Ain't nobody perfect".

== Chart performance and recognition ==
Despite the popularity of Wainwright's tribute concerts, an abundance of press regarding the album, and generally favorable critical reception, album sales were limited. However, Rufus Does Judy at Carnegie Hall reached a peak position of number 84 in Belgium, number 88 in the Netherlands and number 171 on the United States' Billboard 200. The album was nominated for a 2009 Grammy Award for Best Traditional Pop Vocal Album, but lost to Natalie Cole's Still Unforgettable. In 2012, AfterElton.com included the album on its list of "10 Great Pop Culture Moments from Famous Canadians".

Chart (2007)	Peak position
Belgian Albums Chart (Flanders)	84
Netherlands Albums Chart	88
U.S. Billboard 200	171

== Track listing ==
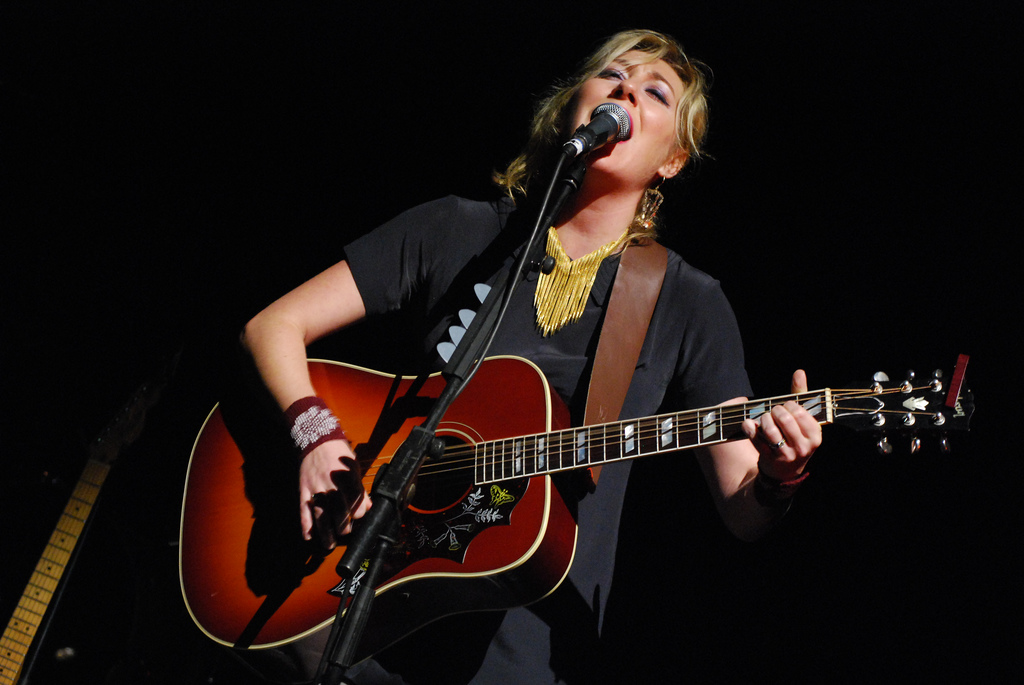
Martha Wainwright performs "Stormy Weather" on the album

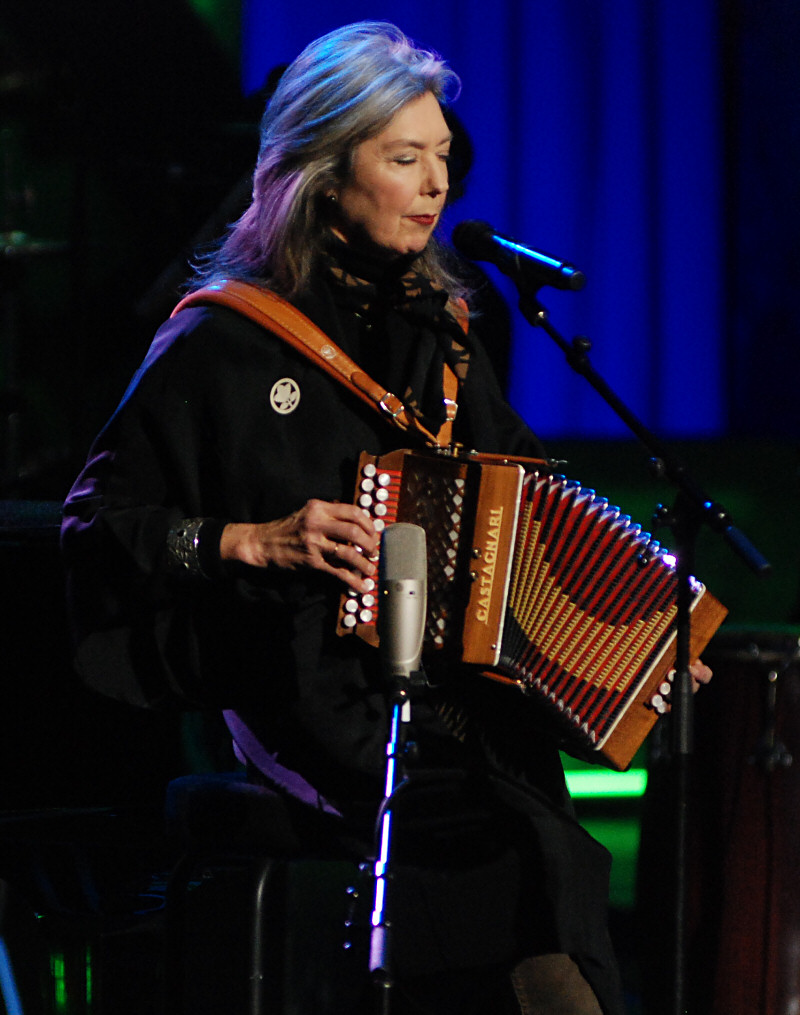
Wainwright's mother, Kate McGarrigle, plays accordion on "Over the Rainbow"

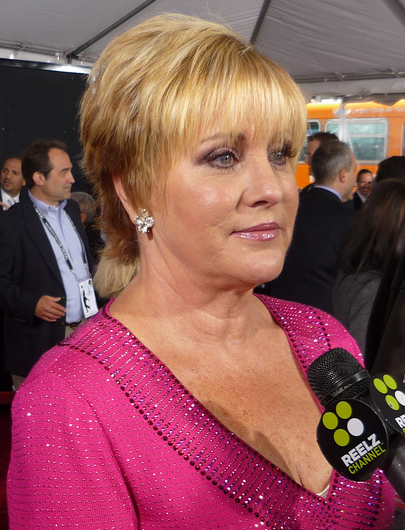
Lorna Luft is featured on "After You've Gone"

Disc 1

1. Overture: "The Trolley Song" / "Over the Rainbow" / "The Man That Got Away"
  (Ralph Blane, Hugh Martin) / (Harold Arlen, Yip Harburg) / (Arlen, Ira Gershwin) – 4:15
2. "When You're Smiling (The Whole World Smiles with You)" (Mark Fisher, Joe Goodwin, Larry Shay) – 3:44
3. Medley: "Almost Like Being in Love" / "This Can't Be Love" (Alan Jay Lerner, Frederick Loewe) / (Richard Rodgers, Lorenz Hart) – 6:10
4. "Do It Again" (George Gershwin, Buddy DeSylva) – 5:15
5. "You Go to My Head" (J. Fred Coots, Haven Gillespie) – 2:40
6. "Alone Together" (Howard Dietz, Arthur Schwartz) – 3:21
7. "Who Cares? (As Long as You Care for Me)" (G. Gershwin, I. Gershwin) – 2:08
8. "Puttin' On the Ritz" (Irving Berlin) – 1:56
9. "How Long Has This Been Going On?" (G. Gershwin, I. Gershwin) – 5:46
10. "Just You, Just Me" (Jesse Greer, Raymond Klages) – 2:03
11. "The Man That Got Away" (Arlen, I. Gershwin) – 4:59
12. "San Francisco" (Walter Jurmann, Gus Kahn, Bronisław Kaper) – 4:53

Disc 2

1. "That's Entertainment!" (Dietz, Schwartz) – 2:27
2. "I Can't Give You Anything but Love" (Dorothy Fields, Jimmy McHugh) – 8:11
3. "Come Rain or Come Shine" (Arlen, Johnny Mercer) – 3:56
4. "You're Nearer" (Rodgers, Hart) – 1:58
5. "A Foggy Day" (G. Gershwin, I. Gershwin) – 2:55
6. "If Love Were All" (Noël Coward) – 2:33
7. "Zing! Went the Strings of My Heart" – (James F. Hanley) – 3:48
8. "Stormy Weather" (Arlen, Ted Koehler) – 6:45 (performed by Martha Wainwright)
9. Medley: "You Made Me Love You" / "For Me and My Gal" / "The Trolley Song" (Joseph McCarthy, James V. Monaco, Roger Edens) / (George W. Meyer, Edgar Leslie, E. Ray Goetz) / (Blane, Martin) – 4:37
10. "Rock-a-Bye Your Baby with a Dixie Melody" (Sam M. Lewis, Fred Schwartz, Joe Young) – 5:45
11. "Over the Rainbow" (Arlen, Harburg) – 4:47 (featuring Kate McGarrigle)
12. "Swanee" (Irving Caesar, G. Gershwin) – 1:54
13. "After You've Gone" (Henry Creamer, Turner Layton) – 2:57 (featuring Lorna Luft)
14. "Chicago" (Fred Fisher) – 4:30

Bonus track

- "Get Happy" (Arlen, Koehler) – 3:12 (offered in the UK and on the US iTunes version)

Track listing adapted from AllMusic.

== Personnel ==
- John Engstead – photography
- Frank Filipetti – engineer
- Peter Gary – digital editing
- John Mark Harris – engineer
- Christian Hebel – concert master
- Alex Lake – photography
- John Loengard – photography
- Kate McGarrigle – performer, liner notes
- John Oddo – piano
- Stephen Oremus – conductor, director, performer, musical direction
- Jack Pierson – art direction, photography, cover photo
- Bucky Pizzarelli – guitar
- Kevin Porter – assistant engineer
- B.J. Ramone – assistant engineer
- Phil Ramone – producer
- Vincent Della Rocca – saxophone
- Jim Saporito – drums
- Richard Sarpola – bass
- Ryan Smith – mastering
- Jeanne Venton – A&R
- Martha Wainwright – performer
- Rufus Wainwright – executive producer
- Missy Webb – assistant engineer

Credits adapted from AllMusic.

== See also ==
- Friend of Dorothy
- List of Judy Garland performances
- List of track-for-track cover albums
