= Who Cares? (Gershwin song) =

1931 song composed by George Gershwin

Song by William Gaxton and Lois Moran

from the album Of Thee I Sing
- Genre: Traditional pop
- Songwriters: George Gershwin; Ira Gershwin

"Who Cares?" is a song composed by George Gershwin, with lyrics by Ira Gershwin, written for their 1931 musical Of Thee I Sing. It was introduced by William Gaxton and Lois Moran in the original Broadway production.

== Notable recordings ==
- Fred Astaire with Benny Goodman and his Orchestra - recorded May 9, 1940 for Columbia Records, catalog No. 35517.
- Kate Smith - for her album Kate Smith (1954).
- Anita O'Day - This Is Anita (1955)
- Sammy Davis Jr. and Carmen McRae - Boy Meets Girl (1957)
- Ella Fitzgerald - Ella Fitzgerald Sings the George and Ira Gershwin Songbook (1959) and the 1983 Pablo release Nice Work if You Can Get It
- Judy Garland - That’s Entertainment (1960), Judy at Carnegie Hall (1961) and on The Judy Garland Show (1963)
- Cannonball Adderley - Know What I Mean? (1961)
- Bill Evans - with Chuck Israels and Larry Bunker on the album Time Remembered (1963)
- Dick Haymes - For You, for Me, Forevermore (1978).
- Tony Bennett - Steppin' Out (1993)
- Michael Feinstein - Nice Work If You Can Get It: Songs by the Gershwins (1996)
- Susannah McCorkle - Someone to Watch Over Me—Songs of George Gershwin (1998).
- Bea Arthur - Bea Arthur on Broadway — Just Between Friends (2002)
- Rufus Wainwright - Rufus Does Judy at Carnegie Hall (2007)
