= Macushla =

1910 Irish song

"Macushla". Sung by tenor Albert Lindquest. Released by Edison Records in 1919.

"Macushla" is the title of an Irish song that was copyrighted in 1910, with music by Dermot Macmurrough (Harold R. White) and lyrics by Josephine V. Rowe.

The title is a anglicization of mo chuisle, an Irish term of endearment meaning "my pulse" (compare cushla machree, from cuisle mo chroí, "pulse of my heart").

== Utilisations in music ==
"Macushla" became the signature tune in the 1912 musical Macushla by Chauncey Olcott.

The song was recorded by a number of operatic tenors including John McCormack, James McCracken, Christian Ketter, Kenneth McKellar and Josef Locke.

== Utilisations in movies ==
- 1938: In Hawaii Calls, Bobby Breen sings it with the Raymond Paige orchestra.
- 1945: In Christmas in Connecticut, starring Barbara Stanwyck, the cow was called Macushla.
- 1996: The song was used in the historical drama, Michael Collins.
- 2004: In Million Dollar Baby, trainer Frankie has "Mo Chuisle" embroidered on the silks of boxer Maggie Fitzgerald (Hilary Swank) for her first overseas fight, and it is subsequently chanted by the various crowds in the film numerous times.
