= Release the Stars =

2007 studio album by Rufus Wainwright

Studio album by Rufus Wainwright
- Released: May 15, 2007
- Studios: Second Story (New York City); Brooklyn Recording (New York City); Legacy (New York City); Saal 4 (Berlin); Strongroom (London); Angel Recording Studios (London)
- Genre: Baroque pop
- Length: 55:09
- Label: Geffen
- Producer: Rufus Wainwright

Rufus Wainwright chronology
Want Two (2004)	Release the Stars (2007)	Rufus Does Judy at Carnegie Hall (2007)

Singles from Release the Stars
- 1. "Going to a Town" Released: April 3, 2007 (US) May 7, 2007 (UK); 2. "Rules and Regulations" Released: July 30, 2007 (UK); 3. "Tiergarten" Released: October 2007 (UK)

Release the Stars is the fifth studio album by Canadian-American singer-songwriter Rufus Wainwright, released through Geffen Records on May 15, 2007. Pet Shop Boys' Neil Tennant was the executive producer; the album was mixed by Record producer Marius de Vries and Andy Bradfield. Wainwright's most commercially successful album to date, Release the Stars charted in 13 countries, reaching Top 10 positions in Denmark, Norway, and the United Kingdom, and was certified gold in Canada and the UK. The album generated three singles: "Going to a Town", which peaked at number 54 on the UK Singles Chart, "Rules and Regulations", and "Tiergarten".

Wainwright planned to create a more simple piano and voice album originally, but began leaning towards more lush sounds once the recording process started. Guests on Release the Stars include: Richard Thompson, longtime friend and fellow singer-songwriter Teddy Thompson, family members Martha Wainwright and Kate McGarrigle, Neil Tennant, Joan Wasser, and actress Siân Phillips. The world tour supporting the album lasted from May 2007 to February 2008, and included appearances in North America, Europe, Asia, and Australia. Wainwright received two Juno Award nominations for Release the Stars, including Adult Alternative Album of the Year and Songwriter of the Year, and won the Outstanding Music Artist award at the 19th GLAAD Media Awards.

== Conception and development ==
"Initially, this was simply going to be an album of piano and voice", Wainwright stated in a May 2007 interview with The Independent's Nick Duerden. That was, however, until he visited Berlin, which influenced the album's lush sound. Wainwright declared, "Basically, a huge wave of German Romanticism descended on the recording process, and almost drowned me." Wainwright cited two reasons for the change in direction and the heightened dramatic flare: the cancer diagnosis received by his mother (folk musician Kate McGarrigle) during the album's genesis, which he found "fueled his creative intensity in some kind of displaced attempt to get her well", and the New York Metropolitan Opera's commissioning Wainwright to write an opera, making Release the Stars a way of training for such a large project. Revealing the overall theme in January 2007, Wainwright declared the album was about opening up and following impulses. "Whether it's the environment, politics or religious warfare", Wainwright stated in an interview with The Japan Times, "it's time to get out there and be a part of the solution, whatever that is."

For his "incredible take on what popular music means in today's world", Wainwright recruited Neil Tennant to advise him, act as executive producer of the album, and assist with the editing process. Parts of the album were recorded at Second Story and Legacy in New York City, Brooklyn Recording in Brooklyn, Saal 4 in Berlin, and Strongroom and Angel Recording Studios in London. Wainwright had his sister Martha Wainwright, half-sister Lucy Wainwright Roche, and mother Kate McGarrigle appear on the album, along with father and son musicians Richard Thompson and Teddy Thompson. Marius de Vries, who produced both of Wainwright's previous albums (Want One and Want Two), worked on the album, as did longtime band members Jeff Hill, Jack Petruzelli, and Matt Johnson.

== Singles ==
"Going to a Town" was released in the United States as a single in digital format on April 3, 2007. The track was later released via digital distribution in the UK on May 7, including "Low Grade Happiness" as a B-side on iTunes. "Going to a Town" entered the UK Singles Chart on May 19, 2007, at number 68. The following week (May 26), the track reached its highest position at number 54. "Going to a Town" lasted on the chart for two weeks in total, and failed to chart in other countries. The music video for the song was directed by Sophie Muller. The video premiered in April 2007, and Logo aired a 20-minute feature on the making of the video on April 27, 2007 (Making the Video: Going to a Town).

The album's second single, "Rules and Regulations", was released digitally in the UK on July 30, 2007. The song failed to chart. Petro Papahadjopoulos directed the music video for "Rules and Regulations", which features a group of men performing a choreographed dance around a long john-wearing Wainwright inside a London mansion.

Released in October 2007, "Tiergarten" was the third single from Release the Stars. A limited edition (500 copies) 12-inch single containing "Supermayer Lost in Tiergarten" was released on October 27. A one-track EP containing the Supermayer remix was released in the UK via iTunes and 7digital on October 29. Both the album version and remix of "Tiergarten" failed to chart.

== Songs and themes ==
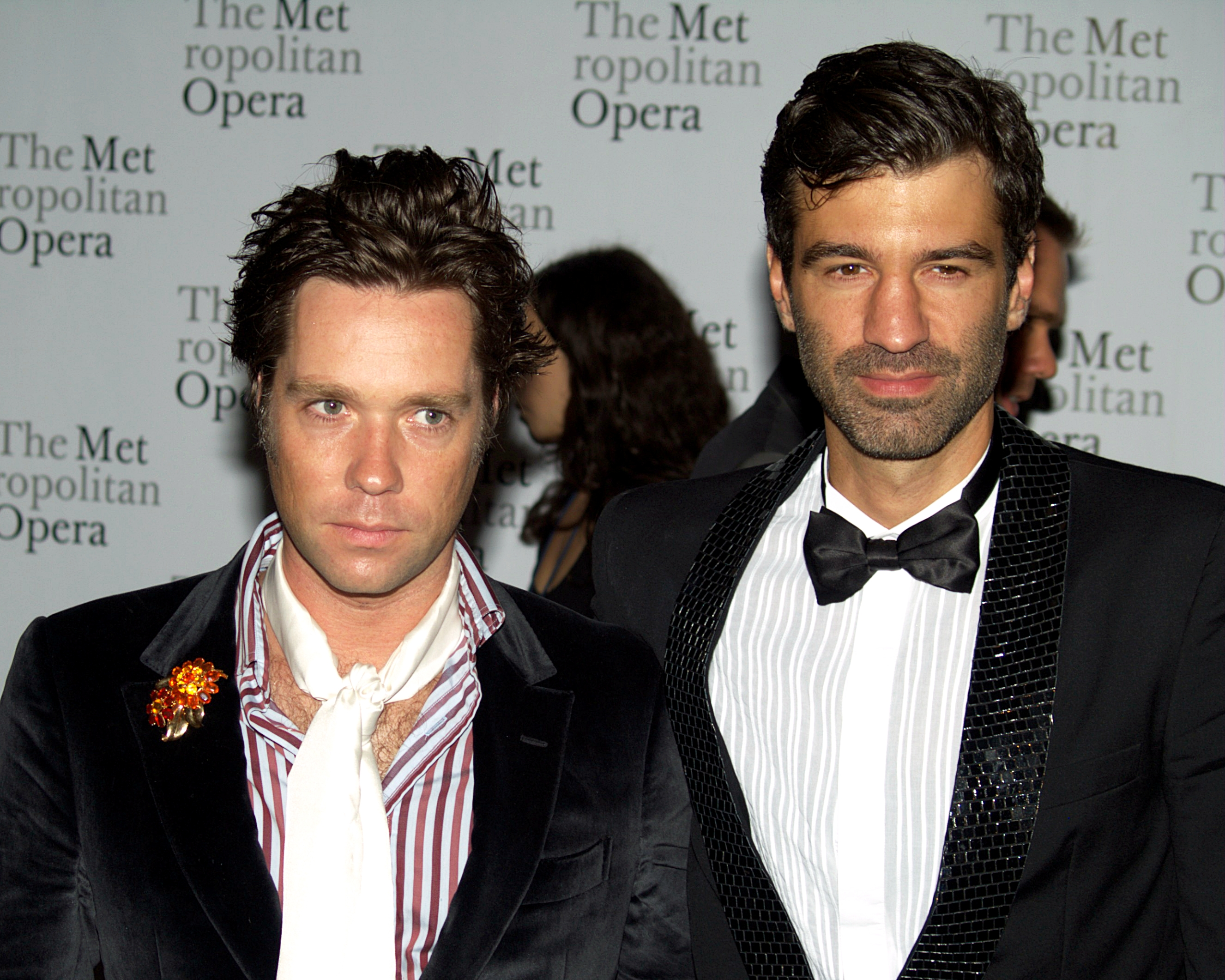
Wainwright and Jörn Weisbrodt at the Metropolitan Opera in 2010; the couple visited Tiergarten in Berlin often while Wainwright recorded the album

"Do I Disappoint You", the album's opener, "sees [Wainwright] present a withering defense of his own human frailties, while one orchestral battalion after another mount their attacks and Martha Wainwright summons 'CHAOS!' and 'DESTRUCTION!' like a marauding Fury". "Going to a Town", the album's lead single, was considered by Uncut's John Mulvey to be among the angriest lyrics Wainwright has written, an "indictment of the country of his birth that hinges on the refrain, 'I'm so tired of you America'". The political track, which Wainwright claimed he wrote in just five minutes on the eve of his departure for Berlin, confronts the Bush administration's perceived damage to the U.S. in the form of a love song. It was his discontent with America at the time that lead Wainwright to spend some time recording the album in Berlin. "Tiergarten", named after a large park in Berlin of the same name, is a song about Wainwright's German boyfriend, Jörn Weisbrodt. While recording parts of Release the Stars in Berlin, the couple visited the park often.

"Nobody's Off the Hook" is written about the singer-songwriter Teddy Thompson, a longtime friend of Wainwright's. Citing Mozart, Beethoven, Schubert, and Mahler as influences, Wainwright stated the string arrangements were his first attempt at writing chamber music. "Between My Legs", which Wainwright wrote about a "boy [he] was infatuated with named Tommy Hotpants", is a "fantasy about being able to save your object of desire when the apocalypse comes, and bring him to some sort of hidden paradise." The last 30 seconds of the song contains the opening notes of the title song from Andrew Lloyd Webber's musical The Phantom of the Opera, along with a dramatic spoken word part by Siân Phillips. According to Wainwright, "Rules and Regulations" was originally written as a slow ballad for Robert Wilson, and is about the perspective of "someone who looks at athletes, but who is not an athlete". "Not Ready to Love" is Wainwright's "surrender to the whole idea of being loved and being able to maintain a relationship."

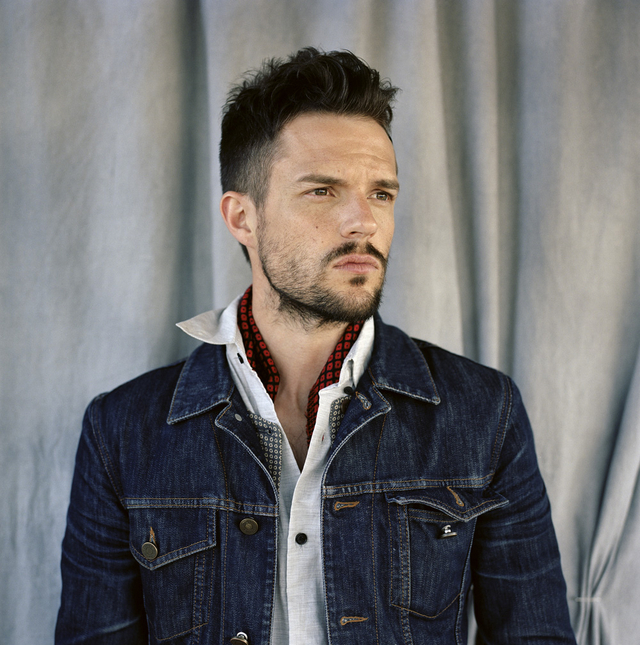
Wainwright wrote "Tulsa" after meeting Brandon Flowers (pictured in 2011) in the city of the same name.

"Slideshow" is about Michael Cavadias, a friend Wainwright took to Australia for a Leonard Cohen tribute concert, who failed to include Wainwright in the computer slide show he put together. Wainwright wrote "Tulsa" after meeting The Killers frontman Brandon Flowers at a bar in Tulsa, Oklahoma. After reuniting with Flowers at the 2007 Glastonbury Festival in England, Wainwright said of their encounter that Flowers was "very flattered" and "somewhat bashful".

"Leaving for Paris N° 2", previously released as "Leaving for Paris" on a bonus CD for Want One in France, differs from the first version with the addition of a second verse along with added instrumental effects. In an April 2007 interview with Scotland on Sunday, Wainwright revealed the inspiration for both "Do I Disappoint You" and "Leaving for Paris N° 2":

[They were] actually written for a musical that I was thinking of writing. They're both about the same person. Essentially it's about an extremely beautiful individual, man or woman, who's deathly attractive, who basically lashes out at his oppressors or fondlers or pursuers. And just tells them that, 'you know, the fact that you love me for my physical attributes is kind of a sin, and in fact I'm a lot like you, and that's the truth. Looking at me physically you don't see my soul.' And that was just [written] during the period when I was obsessed with good-looking people and why people liked them.

Wainwright later stated that the musical was Moulin Rouge!:

"[Leaving for Paris]" is a very old song. I wrote this years ago, and I've sung it for a long time. Initially, it was a piece I wrote for Moulin Rouge!, Baz Luhrmann's movie. I thought it would be great for Nicole Kidman to sing, and kind of walk away from her little village and end up a prostitute in Paris. Slowly, Nicole Kidman morphed into me. Because they didn't use it in the movie, I kept it for myself.

"Sanssouci" was inspired by 18th century Prussian monarch Frederick the Great's Rococo summer palace outside Berlin. Wainwright has said the song is about the discrepancy between expectations from success and its reality. "Release the Stars", the title track and album closer, has a "brassy Broadway swagger". The song's lyrical inspiration comes from Lorca Cohen, Leonard's daughter, "missing the New York show" (referring to one of the Judy Garland tribute concerts Wainwright performed in June 2006 at Carnegie Hall).

== Cover art and liner notes ==
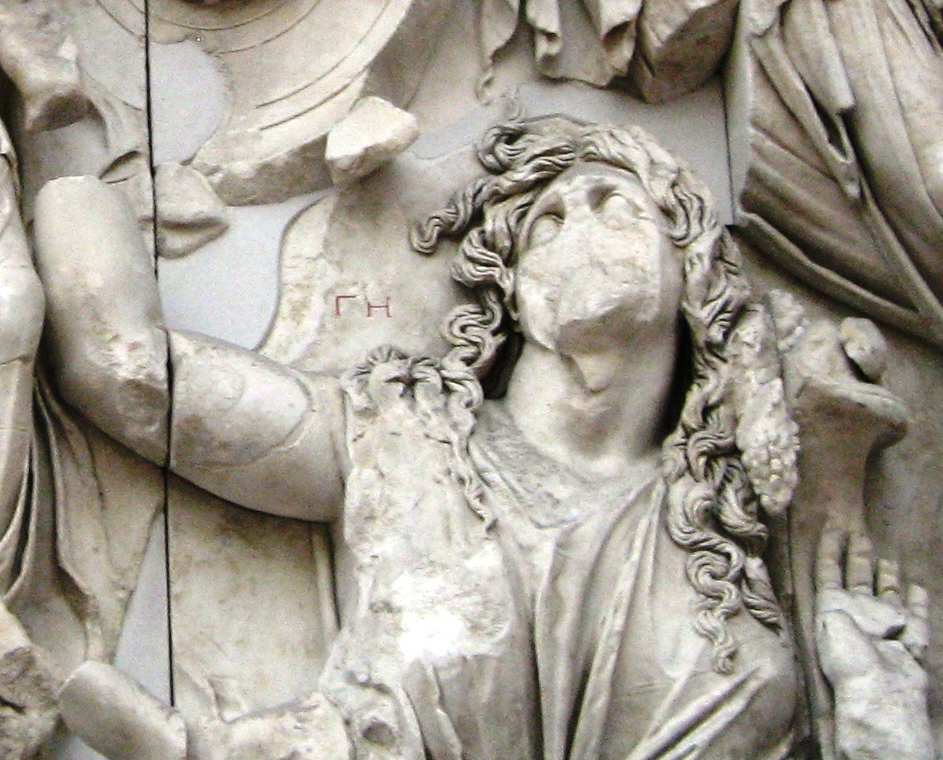
Detail from the gigantomachy frieze at the Pergamon Altar that was used for the album cover

The images on the album's front cover, back cover, and liner notes are from the gigantomachy frieze at the Pergamon Altar in Berlin. The photos were taken by Wainwright. Insert photographs of Wainwright, the altar, the bushes, and the long path were taken by Sam Taylor-Johnson, Wainwright, Lucy Roche, and Weisbrodt. In the liner notes, Wainwright gives "special thanks to all [his] family and friends".

== World tour ==
To promote the album, Wainwright embarked on a tour that lasted for nearly eight months, starting in London in May 2007 and ending in New York City in February 2008. The tour visited the United States and Canada during June–August 2007, the UK in October, Europe during November–December, and Japan and Australia / New Zealand during January–February 2008. Throughout much of the tour, fans could audition to join Wainwright on stage and perform their own rendition of Siân Phillips' spoken word part in "Between My Legs". Candidates posted their audition videos on YouTube, and a winning act was chosen for each concert. Photos of "Between My Legs" contest winners performing on stage with Wainwright were posted on his official MySpace site. The last stop of the tour was Valentine's Day, February 14, 2008, at Radio City Music Hall in NYC.

== Critical reception ==
Professional ratings
Aggregate scores
Source	Rating
Metacritic	72/100
Review scores
Source	Rating
AllMusic	3/5 stars
Robert Christgau	(2-star Honorable Mention)
Entertainment Weekly	B+
The Guardian	4/5 stars
NME	5/10
The Observer	5/5 stars
Pitchfork	6.7/10
Slant	3.5/5 stars
The Times	4/5 stars
Uncut	4/5 stars

Overall, reception of the album was positive. In his review for The Guardian, Alexis Petridis wrote that Release the Stars "is, by anyone's standards, a wonderful album, packed with stunning melodies and brilliant lyrics." Billboard magazine's Susan Visakowitz described the album as Wainwright's "most unabashedly flamboyant record yet", with "larger-than-life melodies wrapped in swelling strings and surging horns and buoyed by the singer's typical swoon-inducing, caramel-covered tenor." The Observer's Stephanie Merritt called the album "complex, melodramatic, ambitious, vain, beautiful and frequently magnificent." While she wrote that Release the Stars may not yield many chart hits, Merritt claimed "it feels like an album that will endure". Music journalist Robert Christgau complimented the album, observing: "To prove he can, [Wainwright] sets just one of this career-topping aggregation of florid melodies to electric guitars, and damn my heterosexual ears for liking it best." Caitlin Moran of The Times declared, "The stars will be released, in batches of fours and fives, in every review." Referring to "Sanssouci", the former summer palace of Frederick the Great and inspiration for the song of the same name, Uncut contributor John Mulvey wrote, "If he keeps making albums as good as this, we should wall him up in there forever."

However, the album did receive some criticism, mostly pertaining to its overly lavish and decadent style. Regarding his attempt at creating radio-friendly music, Petridis claimed that Wainwright "doesn't seem to be trying at all" by employing Neil Tennant (a musician also known for grandiloquence) as executive producer of the album and including extravagant orchestrations. He wrote, "every time Wainwright seems on the verge of making a straightforward appeal for the mainstream, he throws a glittery spanner in the works." He noted the exotic instruments used in "Do I Disappoint You": "It's a marvelous song, but it's lavishly decorated with thundering timpani, fluttering woodwind, pizzicato strings and brass." Petridis questions, "Is this really the way he proposes to win over the punters who pick up two albums a year?" In his review for NME, Priya Elan wrote: "Someone needs to tell Wainwright there's a huge difference between 'epic' and 'over-egged'." Entertainment Weekly's Gregory Kirschling stated that Release the Stars was "adorned with more strings, horns, choirs, and piccolo flute (!) than ever, his melodies — and what melodies they are — are drowned out by the bombast", citing "Nobody's Off the Hook" as an example. "But", Kirschling stated, "he still yearns more beautifully than anyone."

== Track listing ==
All tracks are written by Rufus Wainwright.

Release the Stars track listing
No.	Title	Length
1.	"Do I Disappoint You"	4:40
2.	"Going to a Town"	4:06
3.	"Tiergarten"	3:26
4.	"Nobody's Off the Hook"	4:27
5.	"Between My Legs"	4:26
6.	"Rules and Regulations"	4:05
7.	"Not Ready to Love"	5:51
8.	"Slideshow"	6:21
9.	"Tulsa"	2:20
10.	"Leaving for Paris N° 2"	4:52
11.	"Sanssouci"	5:16
12.	"Release the Stars"	5:20

Bonus tracks
Best Buy bonus tracks via download card: "Old Paint" (with Loudon Wainwright III) – 2:44; "Low Grade Happiness" – 5:24; iTunes pre-order bonus track: "Cowboy Song" – 3:45; UK version bonus track: "Do I Disappoint You" (instrumental version) – 4:39; Deluxe version contains a bonus DVD with album commentary and live performances of "The Art Teacher", "Rebel Prince", "Gay Messiah" and "Vibrate". Wal-Mart online bonus track: "Patience Is a Virtue" – 4:14

== Personnel ==
- Rufus Wainwright – vocals (1–12), piano (1–3, 5, 9, 10), string arrangement (2, 4, 7–9, 12), acoustic guitar (5–8), piano arrangement (4, 9), horn arrangement (6, 8), nylon string guitar (11), percussion (3), orchestral arrangement (1)
- David Adorjan – cello (1, 2, 4, 9)
- Gabriel Adorjan – violin (1, 2, 4, 9)
- Carl Albach – trumpet (1, 6, 8), piccolo trumpet (1, 6, 8)
- Brad Albetta – bass guitar (11)
- Steven Bernstein – trumpet (1, 6, 8, 12), conducting (1, 6, 8), horn arrangement (12)
- Jason Boshoff – programming (1, 3, 5, 6, 11)
- Rob Burger – organ (12)
- Ozan Cakar – French horn (1, 2, 5)
- John Chudoba – trumpet (1, 6, 8)
- Barry Danielian – trumpet (12)
- Marius de Vries – programming (1, 3, 5, 6, 11), conducting (7, 8, 12), breathing (3)
- Dominic Derasse – trumpet (1, 6, 8), piccolo trumpet (1, 6, 8)
- Florian Dorpholz – trumpet (1, 2, 5)
- Lygia Forrest – backing vocals (12)
- Rachelle Garniez – claviola (6), accordion (6)
- Pirmin Grehl – flute (1, 11)
- Jason Hart – backing vocals (5), organ (2)
- Jeff Hill – electric bass (5–8), bass guitar (1, 3, 10), upright bass (2, 6), backing vocals (5)
- Smokey Hormel – guitar (12)
- Matt Johnson – drums (2, 3, 5–8), backing vocals (5), percussion (8), recorder (6)
- Sharon Jones – backing vocals (12)
- Briggan Krauss – baritone saxophone (12)
- Gerry Leonard – guitar (1, 5, 6, 11), electric guitar (3, 7)
- Dan Levine – trombone (1, 6, 8, 12)
- The London Session Orchestra – strings (7, 8, 12)
- Kate McGarrigle – piano (7)
- John Medeski – piano (12)
- Raphael Mentzen – trumpet (1, 2, 5)
- Ronith Mues – harp (3, 5, 11)
- Jenni Muldaur – backing vocals (3, 11)
- Larry Mullins – shaker (1, 2, 6), triangle (1, 2, 5), timpani (1, 5), cymbals (1, 5), tambourine (1, 6), vibes (1, 7), piano percussion (1), bass drum (1), tabla (6), bongos (5), bells (1), cowbells (1), castanets (5), woodblock (6), fish (6), marimba (2), glockenspiel (1)
- Jack Petruzzelli – acoustic guitar (5, 6, 11), electric guitar (5, 7, 8), backing vocals (5), banjo (2)
- Siân Phillips – spoken word (5)
- Anna Prohaska – vocals (5)
- Julianna Raye – backing vocals (2, 5, 8, 11), tambourine (5)
- Rachel Rilling – violin (1, 2, 4, 9)
- Lucy Roche – backing vocals (2, 5, 8, 11)
- Raphael Sachs – viola (1, 2, 4, 9)
- Jorg Sandnar – piano (4)
- Tony Scherr – upright bass (12)
- Louis Schwadron – French horn (5)
- Paul Shapiro – tenor saxophone (12)
- Tom Stephan – additional programming (3)
- Neil Tennant – backing vocals (3, 6, 7), breathing (3), keyboards (7), synthesizer (6), loops (1), samples (1), vibes (7), executive producer
- Ian Thomas – drums (5)
- Richard Thompson – electric guitar (2, 5, 7, 8), acoustic guitar (3)
- Teddy Thompson – backing vocals (3)
- Dave Trigg – trumpet (1, 6, 8), piccolo trumpet (1, 6, 8)
- Martha Wainwright – backing vocals (1,8)
- Joan Wasser – backing vocals (2, 5, 8, 11), electric guitar (5, 8), violin (2)
- Kenny Wollesen – drums (12)

== Chart positions and certifications ==
Release the Stars debuted at number 23 on the US Billboard 200, Wainwright's highest debut chart position as of 2009, selling about 24,000 copies in its first week. The album also achieved Wainwright's highest chart position on the UK Albums Chart, debuting at number 2 with sales approaching 30,000 in the first week. Overall, Release the Stars charted in 13 countries, reaching Top 10 positions in Denmark, Norway, and the United Kingdom. The album was certified gold in both Canada and the UK.

Chart performance for Release the Stars
Chart (2007)	Peak position
Australian Albums (ARIA)	58
Austrian Albums (Ö3 Austria)	72
Belgian Albums (Ultratop Flanders)	22
Canadian Albums (Billboard)	7
Danish Albums (Hitlisten)	8
Dutch Albums (Album Top 100)	27
French Albums (SNEP)	53
German Albums (Offizielle Top 100)	45
Irish Albums (IRMA)	9
Italian Albums (FIMI)	61
Norwegian Albums (VG-lista)	4
Portuguese Albums (AFP)	30
Scottish Albums (Official Charts)	3
Spanish Albums (Promusicae)	40
Swedish Albums (Sverigetopplistan)	14
UK Albums (Official Charts)	2
US Billboard 200	23

Certifications for Release the Stars
Country	Certification
Canada	Gold
United Kingdom	Gold

== Awards and recognitions ==
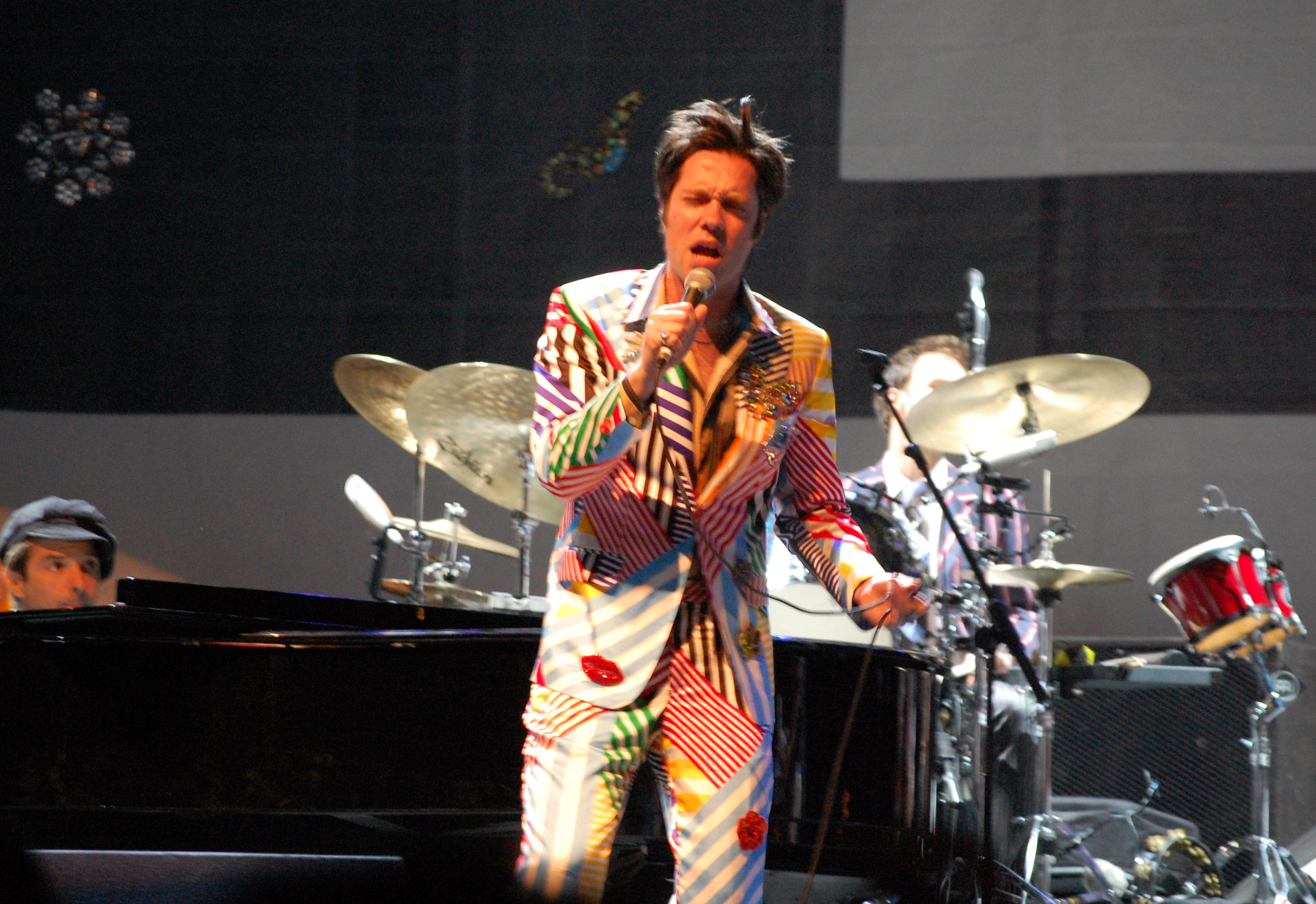
Wainwright performing in 2007

Wainwright received two Juno Award nominations for Release the Stars, including Adult Alternative Album of the Year and Songwriter of the Year for "Going to a Town", "Release the Stars", and "Do I Disappoint You". Wainwright won the Outstanding Music Artist award at the 19th GLAAD Media Awards, an awards ceremony created by the Gay & Lesbian Alliance Against Defamation to recognize and honor LGBT representation in mainstream media. At the same ceremony, Wainwright was presented with the Stephen F. Kolzak Award, an honor given to an openly gay member of the entertainment or media community for his or her work toward eliminating homophobia.

The following table displays some of the 2007 "End of Year" list placements by various publications:

Accolades received by Release the Stars
Publication	Country	Accolade	Rank
Adresseavisen	Norway	Top Albums of 2007 (International)	12
Aftenposten	Norway	Top Albums of 2007	23
Dagbladet	Norway	Top Foreign Albums of 2007	24
Gaffa	Denmark	Top Foreign Albums of 2007	2
Mojo	UK	MOJO Best of 2007	13
Mondo Sonoro	Spain	Top Albums of 2007 (International)	28
The Observer	UK	2007: The Best 50 Albums	21
Q	UK	The 50 Best Albums of 2007	10

== See also ==
- Kate and Anna McGarrigle
- Martha Wainwright discography
