= Sanssouci (song) =

Song by Rufus Wainwright

from the album Release the Stars
- Released: May 15, 2007
- Genre: Pop
- Length: 5:16
- Label: Geffen
- Songwriter(s): Rufus Wainwright
- Producer(s): Rufus Wainwright

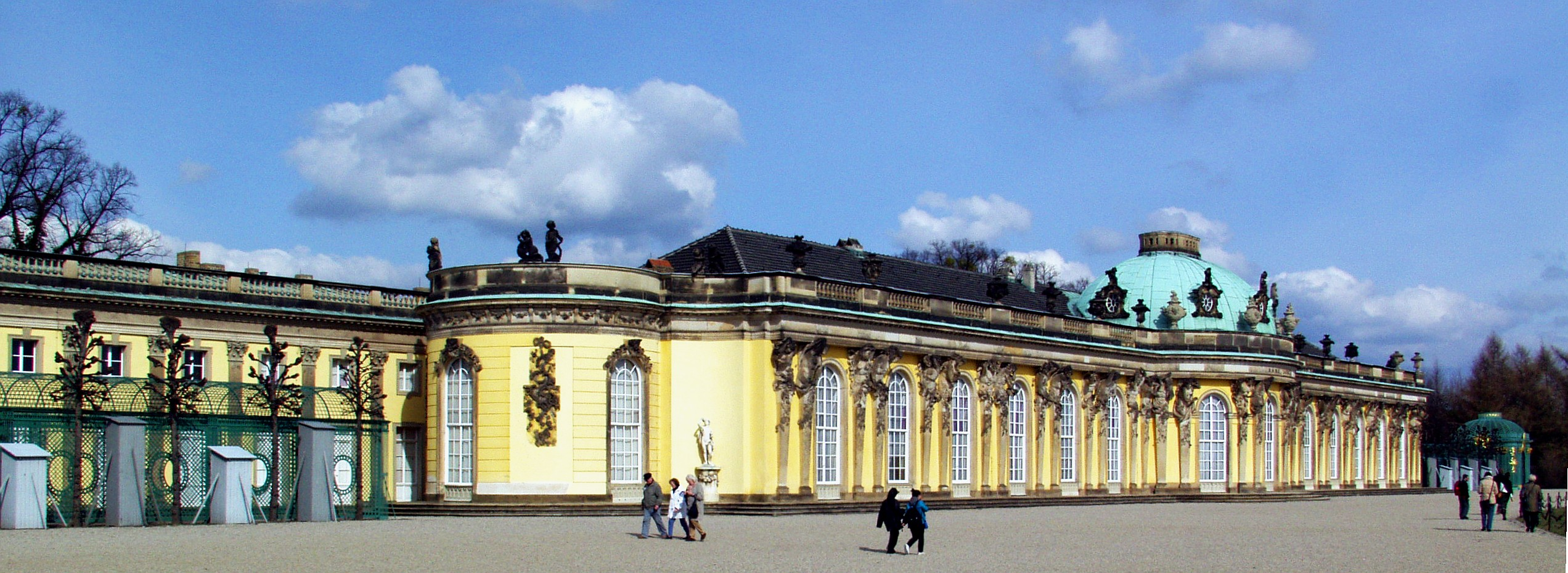
The South or Garden façade and corps de logis of Sanssouci

"Sanssouci" is a song written by Rufus Wainwright; appearing as a track on his fifth studio album, Release the Stars (2007). The name is a reference to the Sanssouci palace built by Frederick the Great in Potsdam, Germany.

The studio recording of the song used in Release the Stars includes both Wainwright's sister, Lucy Wainwright Roche, and his long-term friend singer-songwriter Teddy Thompson, on backing vocals.

Originally a French term, the expression "sans souci" translated into English means roughly "without worry", "without cares", or "carefree".

== Personnel ==
- Rufus Wainwright – vocals, nylon string guitar
- Brad Albetta – bass
- Jason Boshoff – programming
- Marius de Vries – programming
- Pirmin Grehl – flute
- Gerry Leonard – guitar
- Ronith Mues – harp
- Jenni Muldaur – backing vocals
- Jack Petruzelli – acoustic guitar
- Julianna Raye – backing vocals
- Teddy Thompson – backing vocals
- Lucy Wainwright Roche – backing vocals
- Joan Wasser – backing vocals
