= Unfollow the Rules =

Studio album by Rufus Wainwright
- Released: July 10, 2020
- Recorded: Mid-2018 – early 2019
- Genre: Pop
- Length: 51:29
- Label: BMG
- Producer: Mitchell Froom

Rufus Wainwright chronology
Take All My Loves: 9 Shakespeare Sonnets (2016)	Unfollow the Rules (2020)	Rufus Does Judy at Capitol Studios (2022)

Singles from Unfollow the Rules
- 1. "Trouble in Paradise" Released: October 24, 2019; 2. "Damsel in Distress" Released: February 27, 2020; 3. "Peaceful Afternoon" Released: March 13, 2020; 4. "Alone Time" Released: April 24, 2020

Unfollow the Rules is a studio album by Rufus Wainwright, released on July 10, 2020. It marks Wainwright's ninth of original material, his first since Out of the Game (2012), and his first under BMG. The album was produced by Mitchell Froom, and other contributors include Matt Chamberlain, Jim Keltner, and Blake Mills.

"Trouble in Paradise", released in October 2019, served as the album's lead single. "Damsel in Distress", "Peaceful Afternoon", and "Alone Time" were released in February, March, and April 2020, respectively. Originally scheduled to be available on April 24, the album's release date was pushed back to July 24 because of the ongoing coronavirus pandemic.

It was nominated for the Grammy Award for Best Traditional Pop Vocal Album at the 63rd Annual Grammy Awards.

== Background and development ==
After Wainwright released his album Out of the Game in 2012, he focused on Take All My Loves: 9 Shakespeare Sonnets (2016), an album with adaptations of Shakespeare's sonnets, and his second opera Hadrian (2018).

The Guardian reported in June 2018 that Wainwright was recording an album in Los Angeles with producer Mitchell Froom. Wainwright said, "They are songs that bubbled up during my years doing operas, and getting frustrated with directors and conductors and opera houses. So I've been going into a room and singing them all to fuck off." Recording sessions with Froom continued into late 2018 and early 2019.

In January 2019, Billboard said Wainwright had "put the finishing touches" on the album, which was being mixed. In addition to recording with Froom in Los Angeles, he confirmed the involvement of drummers Matt Chamberlain and Jim Keltner, as well as guitarist Blake Mills. Wainwright said the album would possibly be called Unfollow the Rules (a phrase used by his daughter), and acknowledged, "there's a large portion of my audience that will be very excited to get a new pop record and has been very patient". Wainwright suggested a possible 2020 release and teased:

It's a deepening on many levels. Being a dad and being married and being over 45, those are some heavy-duty situations here. I have some funny numbers; I maintain the Wainwright sense of humor, which is a familial trait. But most of it sort of dwells within the eternal feelings that I like to engender in my material, where it can be sung by anyone at any time.

Wainwright signed a new global recordings agreement with BMG in October 2019 to release the studio album, which has been described as "a return to form and his most accessible album to date" and "the bookend" to his 1998 self-titled debut. Wainwright also released the single "Trouble in Paradise" in October, causing further reporting by media outlets about the expected album release in 2020.

== Recording ==
Songs were tracked at United Recording.

== Promotion ==
=== Singles ===
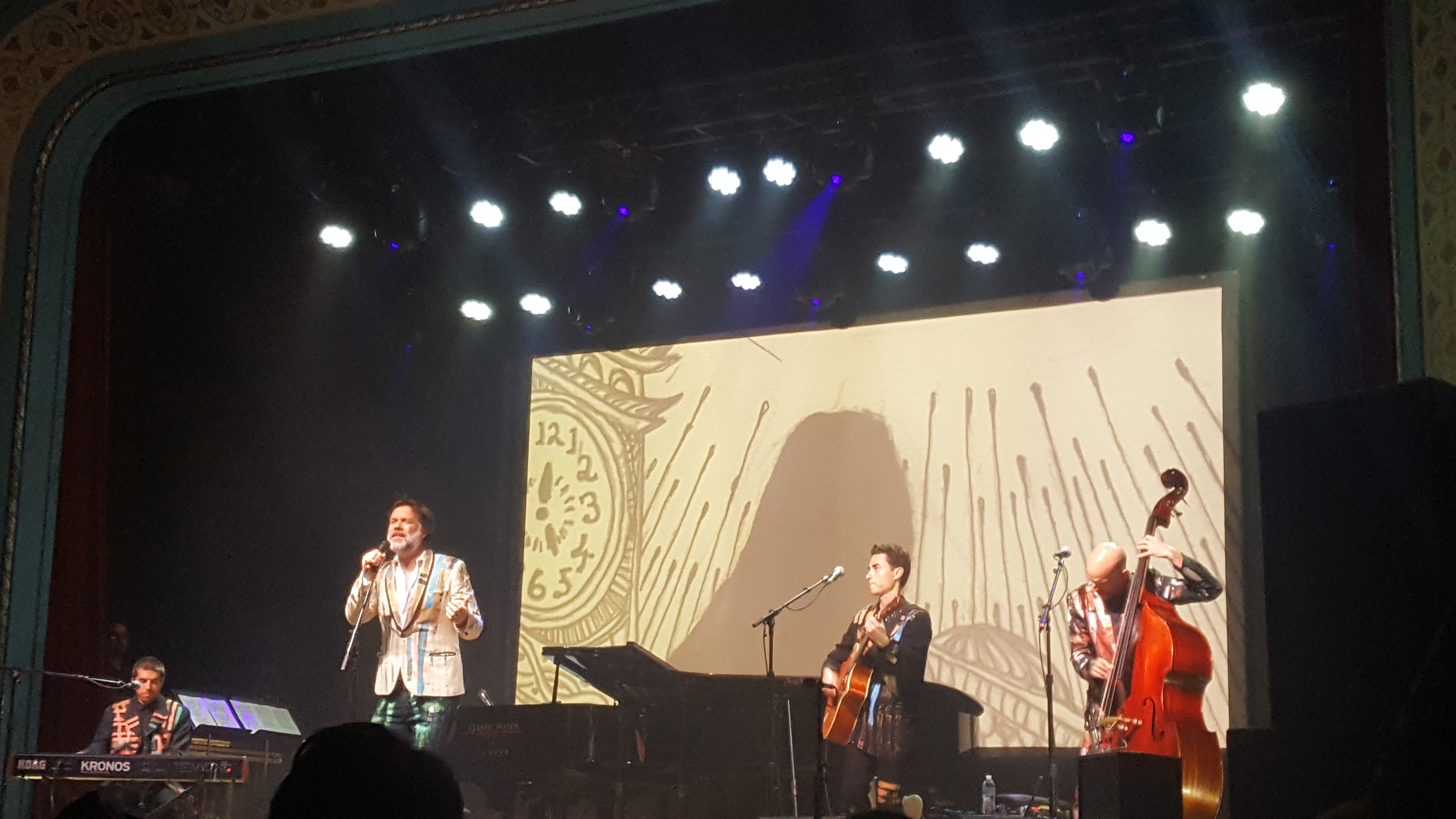
Wainwright performing in Portland, Oregon, as part of the Unfollow the Rules Tour

"Trouble in Paradise" was released as a single in October 2019.

"Damsel in Distress" was released as the second single on February 27, 2020.

"Peaceful Afternoon" was released on March 13, along with a French version of the song called "Pièce à vivre".

"Alone Time" was released as a single on April 24, alongside a black and white music video by animator Josh Shaffner, who used his own drawings as well as others by Wainwright.

A video for "You Ain't Big" was released shortly afterwards and another video was made for "Devils & Angels (Hatred)", which was released in the fall of 2020. The latter was also performed live on a rooftop during the 63rd Grammay Awards in 2021.

== Composition ==
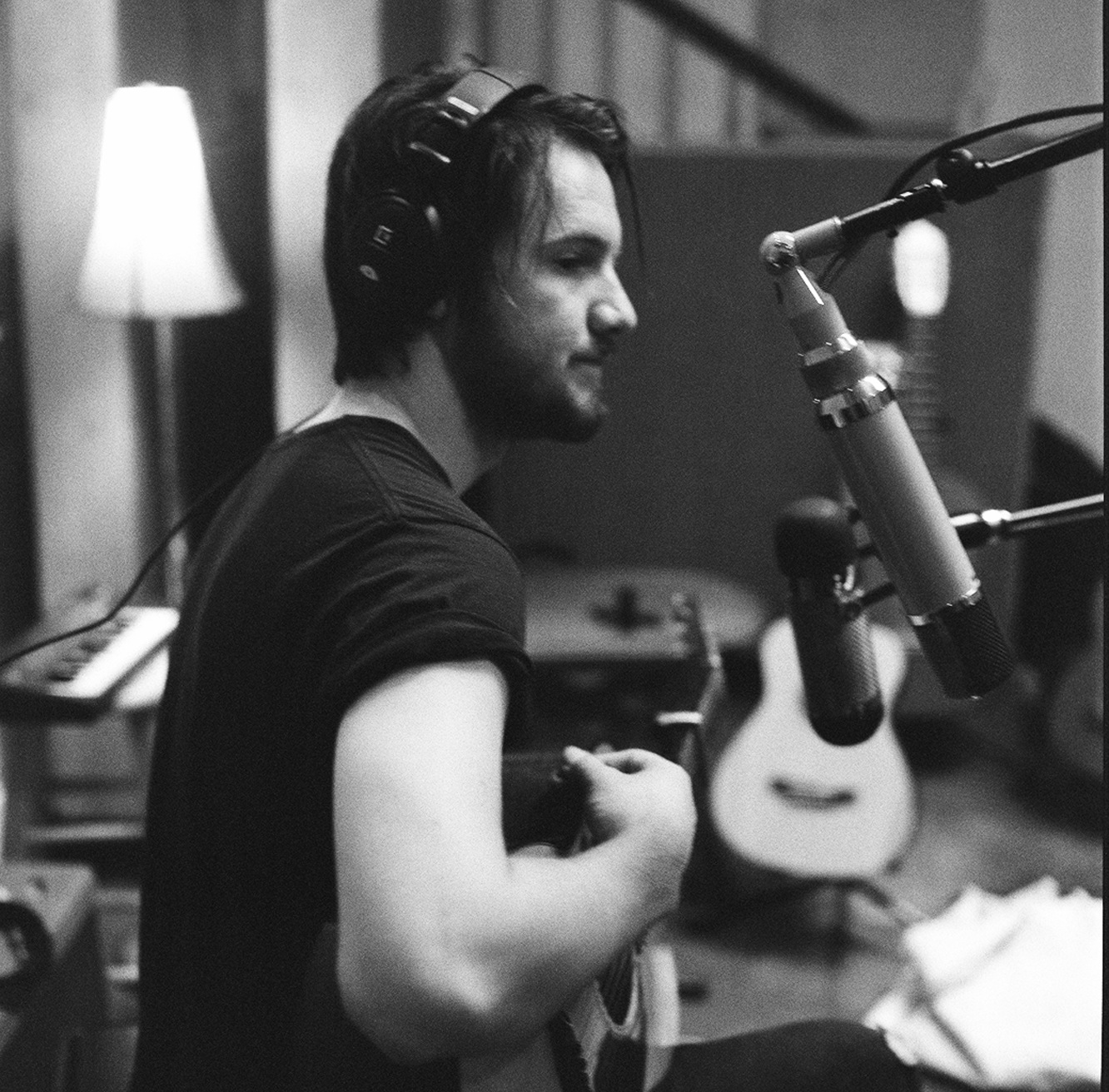
Guitarist Blake Mills (pictured in 2012) contributed to the album.

In mid 2018, newspapers reviewing Wainwright's concerts said he performed a song about his husband Jörn Weisbrodt from his upcoming album called "Peaceful Afternoon". Keith Bruce of The Herald called "Peaceful Afternoon" "a lovely, honest, heartfelt" song and wrote, "in style and structure it could as easily have been written by his father Loudon Wainwright III". Wainwright also performed the song at the 42nd Annual Ann Arbor Folk Festival in January 2019.

"Alone Time" has been described as a "bittersweet lullaby" with lyrics "about needing personal space but still pledges to be there for someone". The song features Wainwright on piano, vocals, and backing vocals.

=== Title track ===
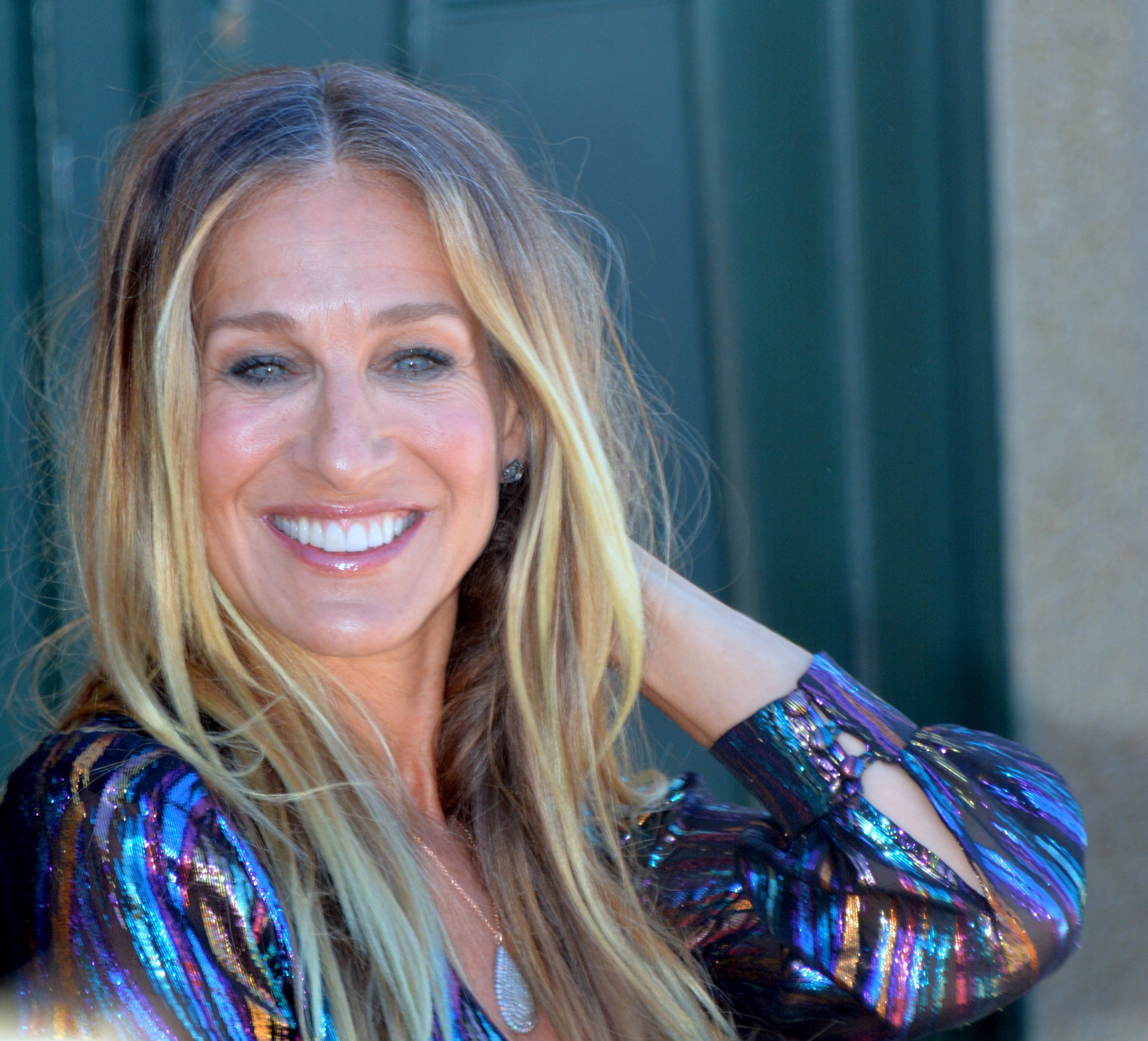
Sarah Jessica Parker (pictured in 2018) sings Wainwright's song "Unfollow the Rules", which was written for the 2018 film Here and Now.

Wainwright wrote the song "Unfollow the Rules" for the 2018 film Here and Now, starring Sarah Jessica Parker, who also served as a producer. Parker, a friend of Wainwright's, asked him to write an original song for the film. He wrote the song after hearing his daughter say, "Daddy, I just want to unfollow the rules." Parker performs "Unfollow the Rules" in the film as Vivienne, an aspiring jazz vocalist. Prior to filming, she rehearsed with Wainwright in his studio along with Scott Wittman. Wainwright and Wittman changed the arrangement and melody to accommodate Parker's voice. She also adjusted her vocal styling based on director Fabien Constant's request that "the performance should be quiet and pulled back".

Parker's performance received a mixed reception. Dan Callahan of TheWrap complimented her singing, but said the musical style did not resemble jazz as intended. Variety's Peter DeBruge wrote, "the scene in which Parker performs it reinforces the degree to which the movie never quite penetrates her point of view (the camera circles, studying her in the blue light of the nightclub, without capturing any sense that those lyrics ought to mean more to her now than ever before)". Jennifer Landes of The East Hampton Star opined, "While she can certainly carry a tune, her breathy delivery doesn't really jibe with the dominance her character is purported to have in her genre." Gotham's Gary Duff called Parker's rendition "magical". Wainwright praised her performance, which he said was "intimate and more interior as opposed to this big, belting number, which it also can be". In late 2018, he told Rolling Stone he planned to record the song for his next studio album. The magazine's Maria Fontoura called the song "appropriately Wainwright-ian, which is to say: dripping in both high-minded intellect and sweeping sentiment".

== Critical reception ==
Professional ratings
Aggregate scores
Source	Rating
AnyDecentMusic?	7.9/10
Metacritic	82/100
Review scores
Source	Rating
The Arts Desk	4/5 stars
Exclaim!	8/10
The Independent	4/5 stars
Loud and Quiet	7/10
MusicOMH	4.5/5 stars
Pitchfork	6.9/10
Record Collector	4/5 stars
Rolling Stone	3/5 stars
The Sydney Morning Herald	3.5/5 stars

Unfollow the Rules was met with positive reviews. At Metacritic, which assigns a normalized rating out of 100 to reviews from professional critics, the album received an average score of 83, based on 8 reviews. The aggregator AnyDecentMusic? has the critical consensus of the album at a 7.9 out of 10. The Independent wrote that the album "finds him settled in domestic bliss and looking back fondly on his hedonistic past" in a mostly positive review. In a review for Pitchfork Zach Schonfeld commented that the "album’s sound is sleek and full of grand, sweeping climaxes that occasionally oversell the songwriting."

The album received a Juno Award nomination for Adult Alternative Album of the Year at the Juno Awards of 2021.

== Track listing ==
1. "Trouble in Paradise" – 3:05
2. "Damsel in Distress" – 4:42
3. "Unfollow the Rules" – 6:39
4. "You Ain't Big" – 2:58
5. "Romantical Man" – 5:27
6. "Peaceful Afternoon" – 4:12
7. "Only the People That Love" – 4:31
8. "This One's for the Ladies (That Lunge!)" – 4:01
9. "My Little You" – 1:47
10. "Early Morning Madness" – 5:32
11. "Devils and Angels (Hatred)" – 4:16
12. "Alone Time" – 4:19

Track listing adapted from Stereogum.

Bonus tracks (European Deluxe edition)
"Haine" (French version of "Hatred") – 4:22; "Pièce à vivre" (French version of "Peaceful Afternoon") – 4:15; These two bonus tracks are translated by Renan Luce

== Personnel ==
- Rufus Wainwright: guitar, piano, vocals
- Matt Chamberlain: drums
- Mitchell Froom: keyboards
- Jim Keltner: drums
- Blake Mills: guitar
- Randy Kerber: piano
- George Doering: mandolin, guitar
- Greg Leisz: pedal steel
- David Piltch: bass
- Dan Higgins: clarinets, saxes, flute
- Rob Moose: violins, violas, string arrangements
- Gabriel Cabezas: cellos
- Davey Faragher: bass
- Laura Brenes: French horn
- Petra Haden: background vocals on "You Ain't Big"
- Gerry Leonard: guitar
- Adam Levy: guitar
- Kaveh Rastegar: bass
- Juliana Raye: background vocals on "Peaceful Afternoon"
- Jennie Kampani: background vocals on "This One's For the Ladies"
- Martha Wainwright: background vocals on "Devils and Angels (Hatred)"
- Thomas Bartlett: piano
- Nick Daley: trombone

== Charts ==
Chart performance for Unfollow the Rules
Chart (2020)	Peak position
Austrian Albums (Ö3 Austria)	29
Belgian Albums (Ultratop Flanders)	45
Dutch Albums (Album Top 100)	28
French Albums (SNEP)	176
German Albums (Offizielle Top 100)	28
Scottish Albums (Official Charts)	7
Swiss Albums (Schweizer Hitparade)	10
UK Albums (Official Charts)	27
US Top Album Sales (Billboard)	46

== Unfollow the Rules: The Paramour Sessions ==
Wainwright released the live album Unfollow the Rules: The Paramour Sessions in 2021.
