= Alone Time =

Single by Rufus Wainwright

from the album Unfollow the Rules
- Released: April 24, 2020
- Songwriter: Rufus Wainwright

Rufus Wainwright singles chronology
"Peaceful Afternoon" (2020)	"Alone Time" (2020)

"Alone Time" is a song by Rufus Wainwright, appearing as the twelfth and final track on his studio album Unfollow the Rules. The single was the album's fourth, released on April 24, 2020 following "Trouble in Paradise", "Damsel in Distress", and "Peaceful Afternoon".

== Composition ==
Like several other songs on Unfollow the Rules, "Alone Time" features Wainwright on vocals as well as backing vocals. The track's producer Mitchell Froom has acknowledged the vocal arrangements are reminiscent of Brian Wilson's music and said, "You can definitely hear a Rufus version of a Beach Boys harmony, but there are a few moments Brian would never do in a thousand years — a dissonance that shouldn't work, but it does."

Jon Pareles of The New York Times offered the following description of the song: "'Alone Time' starts like some other Rufus Wainwright songs, solo with steady piano chords and a long-breathed melody. He asks for 'alone time' but quickly adds, 'Don't worry, I will be back.' But as he offers extravagant promises for his return, his backup vocals sweep in like a tsunami; their entrance is hair-raising before they enfold him in reassurance."

Wainwright has described the track as "an old-school record that attempts to take the listener on a rich journey through the myriad experiences of this thing we call 'life'". The song is dedicated to those who experienced isolation during the COVID-19 pandemic. Wainwright said, "But today, in these dark times, I'm thinking a lot about the thousands of people who, due to COVID-19, are forced to experience intense isolation at the end of their days in order to save others, and the incredible fear that that must entail. This track is humbly dedicated to them; it is a wish of hope and a prayer for grace that they feel some sense of joy and comfort in knowing they are performing such an incredible act of sacrifice for humanity." According to Brendan Kelly of the Montreal Gazette, the song has also been dedicated specifically to "the many seniors around the world who are dying alone in the midst of the COVID-19 crisis".

== Promotion ==
"Alone Time" was released as a single on April 24, 2020, the original release date for Unfollow the Rules before delays were forced by the coronavirus pandemic. Patrick Clarke of NME called the single's release "timely" and said the song is "well-titled"; similarly, NewNowNext.com's Chris Azzopardi called the song "aptly titled". While being quarantined in his Los Angeles home, Wainwright streamed daily performances online. He performed "Alone Time" on April 24.

== Music video ==
The single was released alongside an animated video by Josh Shaffner, who used his own drawings as well as others by Wainwright.

== Track listing ==
Track listing adapted from Spotify.

1. "Alone Time" – 4:18
2. "Peaceful Afternoon" – 4:16
3. "Damsel in Distress" – 4:42
4. "Trouble in Paradise" – 3:05
