= Veneration (disambiguation) =

Veneration is the practice of honoring people and articles of religious significance.

Veneration may also refer to:

== Religion ==
- Veneration of the dead
- Veneration of Mary in the Catholic Church
- Veneration of relics

== Other uses ==
- "Veneration", poem by Lauren K. Alleyne
- Veneration, 2007 album by Wayne Escoffery released by HighNote Records
- Veneration, series of performances by Andrew Ondrejcak
