= All These Poses Anniversary Tour =

2018–19 concert tour by Rufus Wainwright

- Tour by Rufus Wainwright
- Start date: November 9, 2018
- End date: May 23, 2019
- Legs: 3
- No. of shows: 19 in North America; 7 in Australasia; 2 in Asia; 18 in Europe; 46 total

Rufus Wainwright concert chronology
- Rufus in Concert (2016–17); All These Poses Anniversary Tour (2018–19); Oh Solo Wainwright (2019)

The All These Poses Anniversary Tour (also known as the All These Poses Tour) was the ninth headlining concert tour by Canadian-American recording artist, Rufus Wainwright. The tour is a celebration of his career, marking its 20th anniversary in May 2018. Wainwright played nearly 50 concerts in North America, Australasia, Asia and Europe.

== Background ==
Wainwright announced the tour in April 2018, on this official Facebook page. The singer was still in the middle of his 2018 regional tours. The tour celebrates Wainwright's career, coinciding with the release of his eponymous debut studio album. Despite the tour commemorating his first album, Wainwright stated he would perform from songs from this first two albums. The singer further explained the name "All These Poses" was far better than the "Rufus Wainwright Tour"; stating the "poses" were the many elements of the maturing of his career and personal life. All songs stuck to their original production but presenting in a charming manner. With this, he able to explore dichotomy of each song. The concert also features select new material, with the second half of the show, the entire Poses album is performed.

During an interview with Scenestr, Wainwright stated this tour was a ramp-up to his forthcoming eighth studio album, his first since 2012. Speaking of the tour, the singer said:

"Funny how one totally changes and totally doesn’t at the same time. Looking forward to singing the longing melodies of a boy with the voice of a grown man, and share it with you all on my #ALLTHESEPOSEStour. I’ll be traveling with my band, performing material from both my Rufus Wainwright & Poses albums."

== Critical reception ==
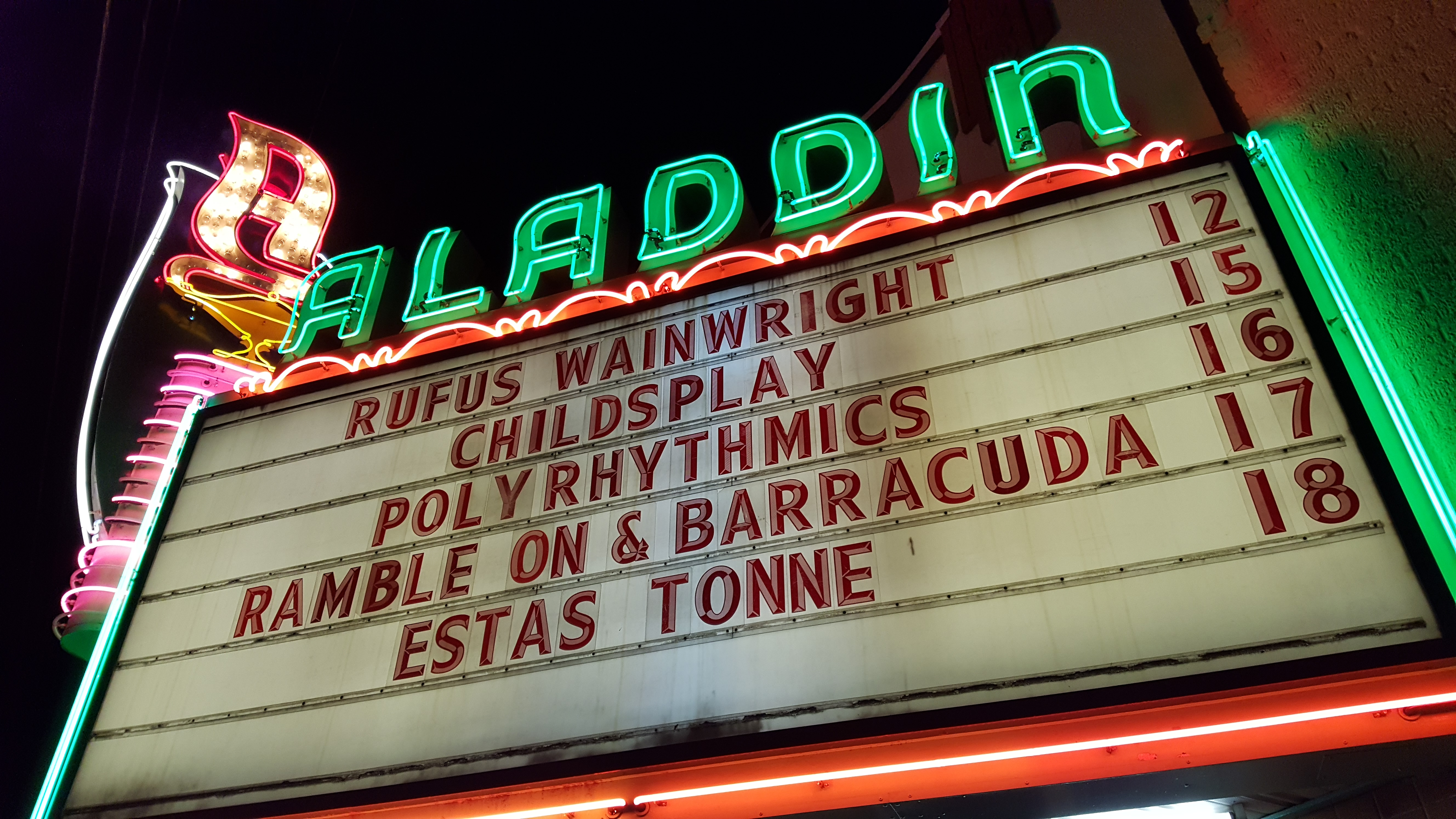
Marquee at the Aladdin Theater in Portland, Oregon, the night of the tour in November 2018

The tour received high praise from critics. Adam Grim of The Cavalier Daily said of the concert in Charlottesville: "Never as famous as his talent merited, Wainwright has matured into a compelling mid-career artist, delving into opera composition and, with 'Sword of Damocles', mastering operatic pop. At the Paramount, Wainwright showcased the triumphs of his prodigious early albums while offering a paradigm for how prodigy matures."

Olivia de Zilva from the Adelaide Review said of the concert in Adelaide: "Ending the set with a cover of The Beatles' 'Across the Universe' (a song which launched him into international prominence courtesy of the I Am Sam (2001) soundtrack), Wainwright modestly bows under a spotlight in a simple red jacket better. At 45, Wainwright seems proud of his accomplishments; looking up into the crowd and smiling humbly, he thanks everyone for supporting him for over 20-years." In Auckland, Gwilym Breese (Radio13) stated the concert was "an experience worth remembering". He further stated: "Somewhere between balladeer and Broadway, the baroque-pop star Rufus Wainwright really showed why he has managed to keep putting out fantastic music for the last twenty years and hopefully, he will do so for another twenty."

For the concert in London, Jazz Monroe (The Guardian) have the shows four-out-of-five stars. She says: "[...]But he is an incorrigible crowd-pleaser, and clearly sees each performance as its own artwork. To open tonight’s show, he strolls on in a pinstripe suit with ankle swingers and a top hat, like an Edwardian circus master."

The shows in Manchester and Glasgow also received four-out-of-five stars. Joe Goggins (Manchester Evening News) wrote: "Still, Rufus Wainwright does precisely nothing in anybody’s image but his own and tonight holds fast to that. When he closes the encore - wearing a lurid bomber jacket not dissimilar to the leather one that Poses describes - he’s doing so in celebratory fashion, with an arms-in-the-air, here’s-to-the-next-twenty sense about him. He never sits still for long, so reflections like tonight should, in the grand scheme of things, be considered welcome rarities." Bill Bain (The Herald) wrote: "All these theatrical poses still work for Rufus, of course. Yet if this tour truly was a funeral for the past, perhaps he’s finally realized if you stay the same too long you turn to stone - becoming nothing but a statue of your former self."

In Ottawa, Daniel Sylvester of Exclaim! said: "Rufus ended the nearly two-and-a-half hour show with his cover of the Beatles' "Across the Universe" before promising that he'll be back next time with "new songs" — clearly showing an exhausted-looking Rufus more than ready to move on from the first 20 years of his career."

== Opening act ==
- Rachel Eckroth (select dates)

== Setlist ==
The following setlist was obtained from the concert held on December 4, 2018, at the Beacon Theatre in New York City, New York. It does not represent every concert for the duration of the tour.

1. "April Fools"
2. "Barcelona"
3. "Danny Boy"
4. "Foolish Love"
5. "Sally Ann"
6. "In My Arms"
7. "Millbrook"
8. "Beauty Mark"
9. "Both Sides, Now"
10. "Sword of Damocles"

Intermission

11. "Cigarettes and Chocolate Milk"
12. "Greek Song"
13. "Poses"
14. "Shadows"
15. "California"
16. "The Tower of Learning"
17. "Grey Gardens"
18. "Rebel Prince"
19. "The Consort"
20. "One Man Guy"
21. "Evil Angel"
22. "In a Graveyard"

Encore

23. "Imaginary Love"
24. "Going to a Town"
25. "Across the Universe"

== Tour dates ==
Date	City	Country	Venue
North America
November 9, 2018	Los Angeles	United States	Orpheum Theatre
November 10, 2018	San Francisco	United States	SF Masonic Auditorium
November 12, 2018	Portland	United States	Aladdin Theater
November 13, 2018	Eugene	United States	Jaqua Concert Hall
November 14, 2018	Seattle	United States	Moore Theatre
November 17, 2018	Boulder	United States	Boulder Theater
November 19, 2018	Minneapolis	United States	State Theater
November 20, 2018	Chicago	United States	The Vic Theatre
November 22, 2018	Toronto	Canada	Queen Elizabeth Theatre
December 4, 2018	New York City	United States	Beacon Theatre
December 5, 2018	Boston	United States	Emerson Colonial Theatre
December 7, 2018	Glenside	United States	Keswick Theatre
December 8, 2018	North Bethesda	United States	The Music Center at Strathmore
December 10, 2018	Charlottesville	United States	Paramount Theater
December 11, 2018	Nashville	United States	CMA Theater
December 12, 2018	Atlanta	United States	Atlanta Symphony Hall
Australasia
February 22, 2019	Adelaide	Australia	Festival Theatre
February 23, 2019^{[A]}	Melbourne	Australia	Melbourne Zoo Pavilions
February 25, 2019	Melbourne	Australia	Elisabeth Murdoch Hall
February 26, 2019	Sydney	Australia	Enmore Theatre
February 28, 2019	Canberra	Australia	Canberra Theatre
March 2, 2019	Auckland	New Zealand	Auckland Town Hall
March 3, 2019	Wellington	New Zealand	The Opera House
Asia
March 28, 2019	Tokyo	Japan	Tokyo International Forum
March 29, 2019	Tokyo	Japan	Tokyo International Forum
Europe
April 1, 2019	Brussels	Belgium	Cirque Royal
April 2, 2019	Arras	France	ArrasThéâtre
April 4, 2019	Mérignac	France	Le Pin Galant
April 5, 2019	Paris	France	L'Olympia
April 7, 2019^{[B]}	Gijón	Spain	Teatro de Laboral Ciudad de la Cultura
April 8, 2019	Madrid	Spain	Teatro Nuevo Apolo
April 9, 2019	Barcelona	Spain	Gran Teatre del Liceu
April 11, 2019	Zürich	Switzerland	Volkshaus
April 13, 2019	Hamburg	Germany	Kampnagel
April 14, 2019	Groningen	Netherlands	De Oosterpoort
April 15, 2019	Amsterdam	Netherlands	Royal Theater Carré
April 17, 2019	Oslo	Norway	Oslo Concert Hall
April 18, 2019	Stockholm	Sweden	Stockholm Concert Hall
April 19, 2019	Copenhagen	Denmark	Koncerthuset
April 21, 2019	London	England	Royal Albert Hall
April 22, 2019	Birmingham	England	Symphony Hall
April 24, 2019	Manchester	England	Bridgewater Hall
April 25, 2019	Glasgow	Scotland	Glasgow Royal Concert Hall
North America
May 21, 2019	Quebec City	Canada	Salle Louis Fréchette
May 22, 2019	Montreal	Canada	Salle Wilfrid-Pelletier
May 23, 2019	Ottawa	Canada	Southam Hall

Festivals and other miscellaneous performances
^{A} This convert was a part of "Zoo Twilights"
^{B} This concert was a part of the "Gijón Sound Festival"

=== Box office score data ===
Venue	City	Tickets sold / available	Gross revenue
The Vic Theatre	Chicago	932 / 932 (100%)	$56,908
