= Peaceful Afternoon =

Single by Rufus Wainwright

from the album Unfollow the Rules
- Released: March 13, 2020
- Songwriter: Rufus Wainwright
- Producers: David Boucher; Mitchell Froom

Rufus Wainwright singles chronology
"Damsel in Distress" (2020)	"Peaceful Afternoon" (2020)	"Alone Time" (2020)

"Peaceful Afternoon" is a song by Rufus Wainwright, released on March 13, 2020, as a single to promote his tenth studio album Unfollow the Rules.

== Composition ==
Stereogum's Tom Breihan described the song as "a lush, warm piece of classic singer-songwriter popcraft". The song about longterm commitment "concisely sums up how hard it is to maintain a relationship". "Peaceful Afternoon" has "strings and horns and sighing backup vocals".

== Release ==
Wainwright confirmed the song's release on Twitter on March 9, 2020. He shared artwork for both the English and French versions of the song on Twitter on March 12. When the song was released, Wainwright tweeted, "Now more than ever, I think there’s nothing we desire more than to simply have a peaceful afternoon. Maybe at this moment, our living rooms are the best places to be. I hope you love this song as I do."

== Reception ==
Spin's Emily Tan called the song "a sweet guitar-driven ballad that will easily your serenade-worthy list".

== Track listing ==
Track listing adapted from Spotify

1. "Peaceful Afternoon" – 4:16
2. "Pièce à vivre" – 4:13
