= Blackoutsabbath =

Blackoutsabbath is a concept created by Canadian-American singer-songwriter Rufus Wainwright, as promoted by the organization Blackout Sabbath. In an attempt to become more environmentally conscious, participants are asked to live "off the grid" as much as possible on a designated date by unplugging appliances, walking or cycling for transportation, turning out lights and decreasing energy usage in any other ways possible.

As the sun sets on the evening of Blackoutsabbath, participants write down a list of ways they can contribute to the earth's well-being throughout the rest of the year. Annual benefit concerts take place to raise awareness of the cause. The organization's official site contains updates about the program and contains links to various tools, green products and services, studies, and groups that promote energy conservation and environmental protection.

== Steps ==
Following is a list of "steps" to take to participate in Blackoutsabbath (dates are geared towards the first celebration in 2008):

1. Log onto the Blackout Sabbath site and check out the proposal and links.
2. (If possible) donate a fridge magnet which will be exhibited on the site and will then be given away at the awareness concert. These can be mailed to my management or given to me at one of my shows. In turn, they will be passed out to members of the audience at the awareness concert to promote the event.
3. Go to the unamplified candle lit concert on March 19 featuring me and my family and many others such as Joan Wasser, Jenni Muldaur, & special guest! at the Angel Orensanz Center.
4. Make plans for what you will do on the day of Blackout Sabbath (June 21), i.e. what you will cook ahead of time, who you will spend it with, etc.
5. On June 21 starting at 12 noon, turn off the lights, unplug your fridge, walk or bike everywhere, do as much as you can to "live off the grid" for the day. But still, even if you just turn off one light, that will be an effort and a contribution.
6. As darkness descends: light your candle, take out your pencil and pad and write down your list of things that you will do in the next year to contribute to the Earth's well-being.
7. Put the list on your fridge with a magnet and keep it there for a year.
8. At midnight, resume your life and try to keep your promises.
9. This exercise will be repeated the next year, at which point you can review your list and make a NEW one!

== Benefit concerts ==
=== 2008 ===
On February 15, Wainwright announced an intimate concert to benefit Blackoutsabbath would take place at Angel Orensanz Foundation in New York City on March 19, 2008. He asked fans to send refrigerator magnets for distribution as part of his initiative, citing "we've moved on from brooches to refrigerator magnets" (brooches were worn throughout his Release the Stars tour). Magnets could be handed to Wainwright directly after concerts or promotional events, or they could be shipped to his management company for collection and later distribution. Special guests performing at the concert included Joan Wasser, Jenni Muldaur and friend and fellow singer-songwriter Teddy Thompson.

=== 2009 ===
The second annual Blackoutsabbath concert with Wainwright and friends, took place on March 4, 2009, in City Winery in NYC. Scheduled to perform are Teddy Thompson, Jenni Muldaur, Lucy Wainwright Roche, Sloan Wainwright, and Sean Lennon.

== Celebrations ==
=== 2008 ===
On June 16, Wainwright posted a message on his site reminding fans to participate on the first annual Blackoutsabbath ritual, which would take place on June 21, 2008, from noon to midnight around the world. Citing that his "message was pretty dry in terms of the comedy section," he attached messages written by his mother, Kate McGarrigle, and boyfriend, Jorn Weisbrodt so that readers could "chuckle a bit". In her message, McGarrigle encouraged readers to "tune out all BlackBerrys, computers, cell phones etc.. turn off all lights and electrical appliances, host a blackoutsabbath, and drop in...preferably outdoors...just like the old celebration of the solstice." While McGarrigle would celebrate the event in Saint-Sauveur, Quebec with "like-minded folks", Weisbrodt revealed in his message that he and Wainwright would be hosting a celebration in Berlin where fans could attend if they RSVP'd appropriately and could find the designated location.

A week following Blackoutsabbath, Wainwright posted messages recapping how he and his friends celebrated the event. He stated the night prior to June 21 involved mostly planning, including food arrangements, how to get his guitar to the apartment ("one of the old Communist towers on Karl Marx Allee"), and how he would be "going down and up five flights of stairs on the hour" to bring guests up to their room. On Blackoutsabbath, Wainwright and Weisbrodt unplugged their appliances at noon and spent the day browsing for magnets at museums, napping and preparing for the party. Once guests arrived, candles were lit and in between trips to greet guests Wainwright and Robert Wilson performed Shakespearean sonnets from a project they were collaborating on. Wainwright admitted he "felt a bit dorky strumming on the guitar and asking everyone to change their lightbulbs, especially since Germany compared to the US is miles ahead in terms of energy conservation." By midnight, guests had completed their refrigerator lists. In his message, Wainwright encouraged fans to continue the Blackoutsabbath tradition by hosting small parties, sharing their stories on the website and inviting friends with knowledge of conservation ("your crazy hippie friend!") to moderate discussion and share their awareness with others.

== Charity events ==
In November 2008, Blackout Sabbath and Global Inheritance partnered with Focus Features to host a charity auction to raise money for the two organizations. The auction winner won an early screening of Gus Van Sant's film, Milk, starring Sean Penn as Harvey Milk. The screening took place at a movie theater local to the winner, who was able to invite up to 50 friends to attend the event. The auction began on November 3 and closed on November 11. 100% of the funds raised was split between the organizations.
