= Dream Requiem =

Work by Rufus Wainwright

- by Rufus Wainwright

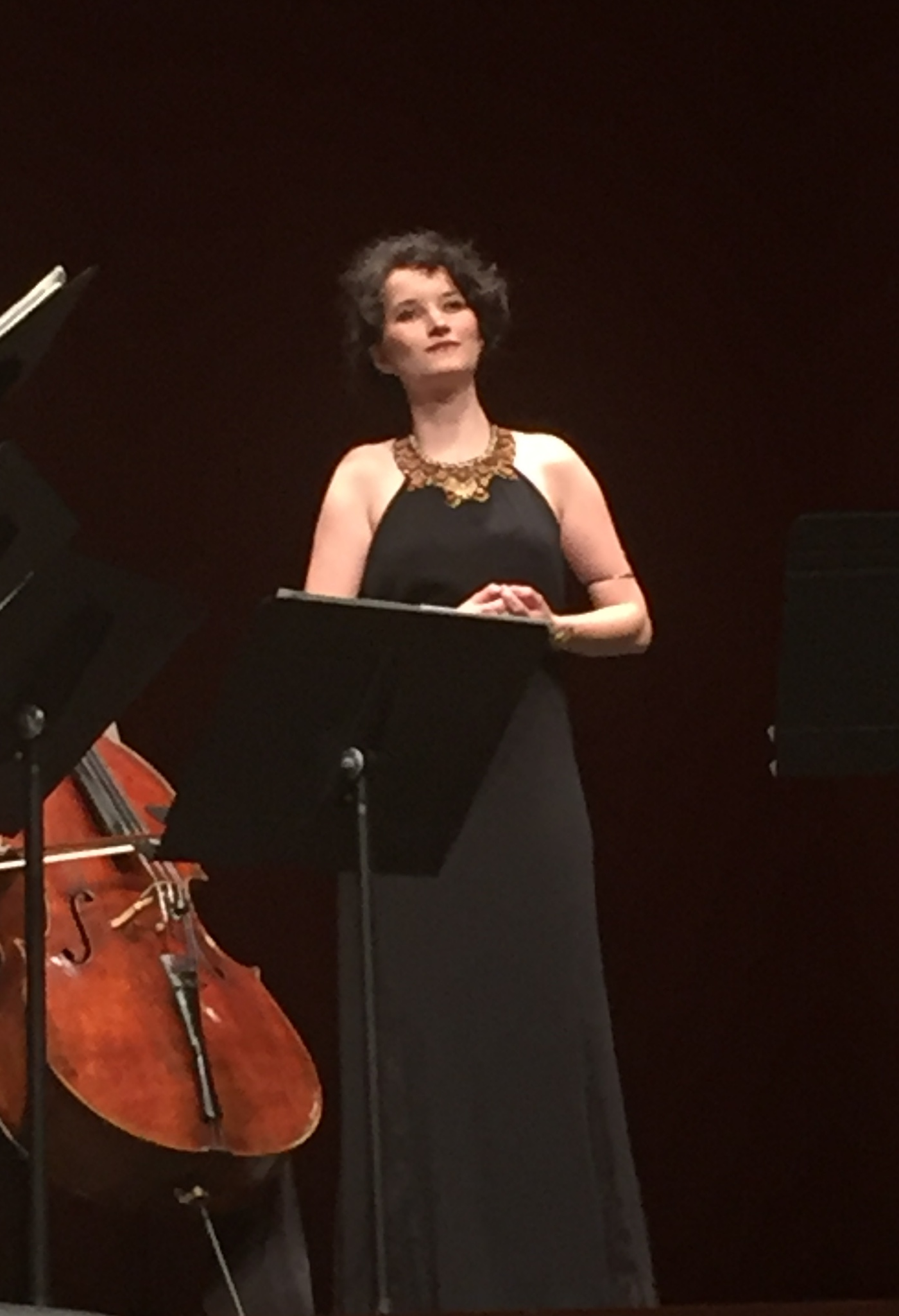
Anna Prohaska (pictured in 2016)

Dream Requiem is a work by Rufus Wainwright, which premiered at the Auditorium de Radio France in Paris on June 14, 2024. The composition is based on a text by Lord Byron and the Requiem Mass.

The Paris premiere featured soprano Anna Prohaska, the Maîtrise de Radio France, the Chœur de Radio France, and the Orchestre philharmonique de Radio France conducted by Mikko Franck. as well as a narration by American actress Meryl Streep.

== Album recording and reception ==
Warner Classics released a recording in 2025, which Andrew Clements of The Guardian rated three out of five stars.
