= Take All My Loves: 9 Shakespeare Sonnets =

2016 studio album by Rufus Wainwright

Studio album by Rufus Wainwright
- Released: April 22, 2016
- Length: 54:26
- Labels: Deutsche Grammophon; Universal Music Canada
- Producers: Marius de Vries; Rufus Wainwright

Rufus Wainwright chronology
Prima Donna (2015)	Take All My Loves: 9 Shakespeare Sonnets (2016)	Unfollow the Rules (2020)

Take All My Loves: 9 Shakespeare Sonnets is a studio album by Rufus Wainwright. It features nine adaptations of Shakespeare's sonnets and guest appearances by Helena Bonham Carter, Fiora Cutler, Peter Eyre, Carrie Fisher, Inge Keller, Siân Phillips, Anna Prohaska, William Shatner, Martha Wainwright, and Florence Welch. Released by Deutsche Grammophon and Universal Music Canada on April 22, 2016, the tribute album commemorates the 400th anniversary of William Shakespeare's death.

== Background ==
The album is a collaboration with Marius de Vries, who produced Wainwright's previous studio albums Want One (2003) and Want Two (2004), and mixed his 2007 album Release the Stars. The concept originated when director Robert Wilson asked Wainwright to compose music for his 2009 production "Shakespeare's Sonnets", which was first staged at the Berliner Ensemble. The San Francisco Symphony later commissioned Wainwright to orchestrate five of the sonnets, which premiered in 2010. Three of the sonnets (Sonnet 10, Sonnet 20, Sonnet 43) appeared on Wainwright's 2010 studio album All Days Are Nights: Songs for Lulu; alternate versions were recorded for Take All My Loves. Wainwright has said, "For me, recording this album has been a marriage made in heaven, as it combines my love of classical music with my love of pop music. It's literally historically fun. And made all the better by working again with Marius." The tribute album commemorates, and was released one day prior to, the 400th anniversary of Shakespeare's death.

Wainwright said of the project:

I guess a fair number of people know the sonnets, but the plays are the centerpiece of Shakespeare's legend. But I've found in working with the sonnets they even transcend the plays, though to even fathom that is inconceivable since the plays are so amazing. But once you start to get into the sonnets it takes on this timeless, ageless, almost futuristic quality. So much of the language and so much of the sentiment is contemporary -- gender and sexuality and love and hate are just so plainly exhibited that it's really searing.

== Composition ==
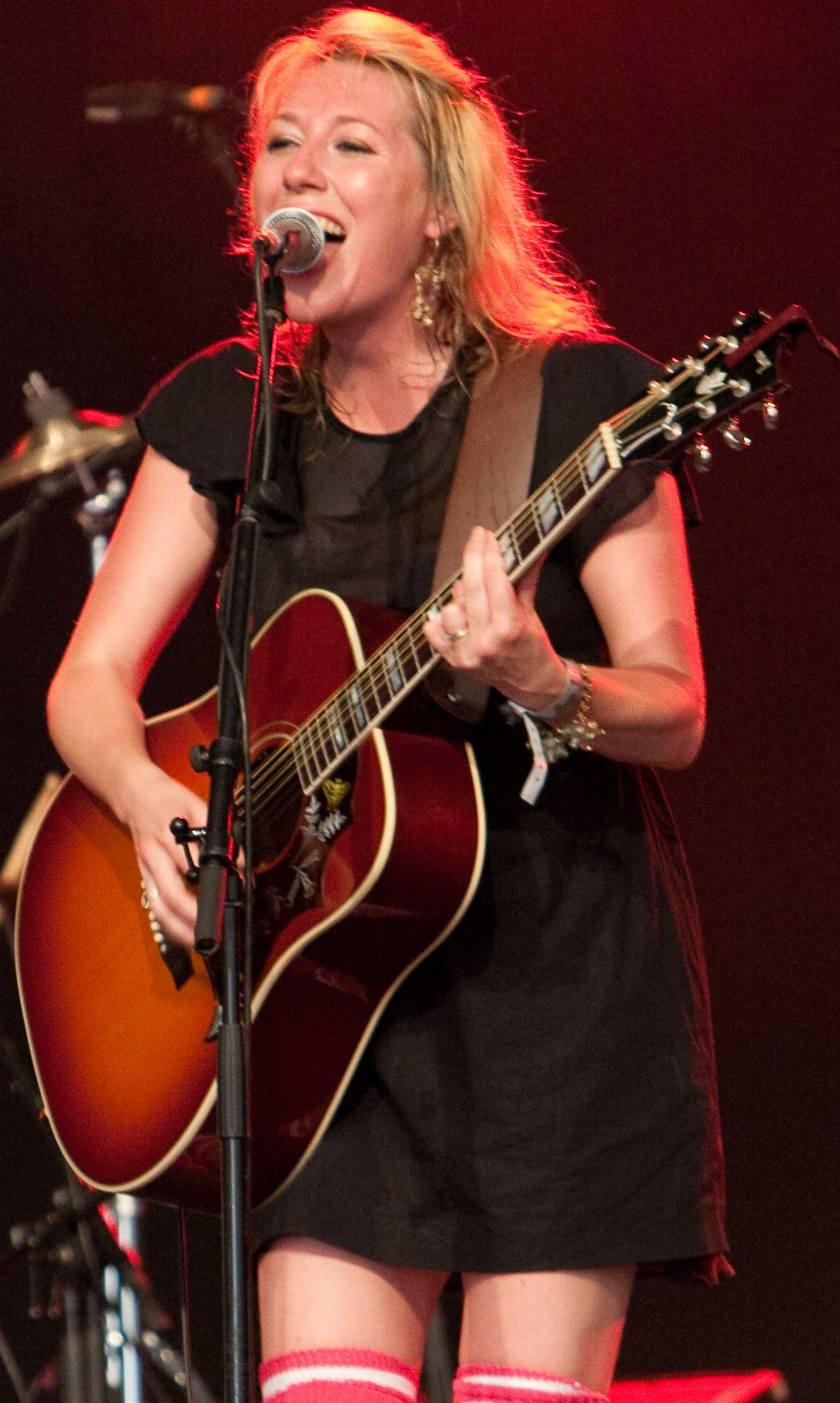
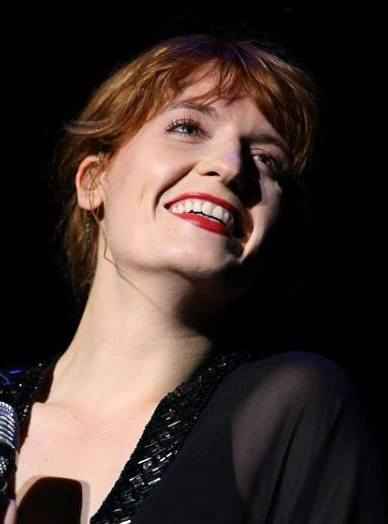
The album features vocal performances by Martha Wainwright (left) and Florence Welch (right).

Take All My Loves, named in honor of Shakespeare's Sonnet 40, includes nine adaptations of Shakespeare's sonnets (Sonnet 10, Sonnet 20, Sonnet 23, Sonnet 29, Sonnet 40, Sonnet 43, Sonnet 66, Sonnet 87, and Sonnet 129) across sixteen tracks. The album features guest appearances by Helena Bonham Carter, Fiora Cutler, Peter Eyre, Carrie Fisher, Inge Keller, Siân Phillips, Anna Prohaska, William Shatner, Martha Wainwright, and Florence Welch. Other contributors include Nicholai Baxter on acoustic guitar, the BBC Symphony Orchestra conducted by Jayce Ogren, the Berlin String Section, Dom Bouffard and Joel Shearer on guitar, Hans-Jörn Brandenburg on piano, Hoon Sun Chae on cello, Chris Chaney and Ralph Graessler on bass, Uhjin Choi on viola, de Vries on keyboard and ROLI Seaboard, Gary Novak on drums, Ilzoo Park and Sophiemarie Yeoungchie Won on violin, and Stefan Rager on drums and percussion.

The album's opening track, "Sonnet 43", is a recitation by Phillips. Prohaska provides vocals on "When Most I Wink (Sonnet 43)". "Take All My Loves (Sonnet 40)" features vocals by Wainwright and a recitation by de Vries. "Sonnet 20" is a recitation by Frally Hynes, and the following two tracks, "A Woman's Face (Sonnet 20)" and "For Shame (Sonnet 10)", feature vocals by Prohaska. "Sonnet 10" is a recitation by Eyre. "Unperfect Actor (Sonnet 23)" is a recitation by Bonham Carter and features vocals by Rufus and Martha Wainwright, and Cutler. "Sonnet 29" is a recitation by Fisher. The following track, "When in Disgrace with Fortune and Men's Eyes (Sonnet 29)" features vocals by Welch and backing vocals by Wainwright and Ben de Vries. "Sonnet 129" is a recitation by Shatner, and the subsequent track "Th'Expense of Spirit in a Waste of Shame (Sonnet 129)" features vocals by Prohaska. "All dessen müd (Sonnet 66)" features vocals by Christopher Nell, Jürgen Holtz, and Wainwright. "A Woman's Face – Reprise (Sonnet 20)" includes vocals by Wainwright and is followed by "Sonnet 87", which is a recitation by Keller. The album's closing track, "Farewell (Sonnet 87)", features vocals by Prohaska.

== Promotion ==
Billboard premiered the reprise version of "A Woman's Face" on March 17, 2016.

== Track listing ==
No.	Title	Length
1.	"Sonnet 43" (featuring Siân Phillips)	1:14
2.	"When Most I Wink (Sonnet 43)" (featuring Anna Prohaska)	4:56
3.	"Take All My Loves (Sonnet 40)" (featuring Marius de Vries)	6:26
4.	"Sonnet 20" (featuring Frally Hynes)	0:52
5.	"A Woman's Face (Sonnet 20)" (featuring Anna Prohaska)	3:49
6.	"For Shame (Sonnet 10)" (featuring Anna Prohaska)	3:12
7.	"Sonnet 10" (featuring Peter Eyre)	0:58
8.	"Unperfect Actor (Sonnet 23)" (featuring Helena Bonham Carter, Martha Wainwright, and Fiora Cutler)	5:43
9.	"Sonnet 29" (featuring Carrie Fisher)	1:02
10.	"When in Disgrace with Fortune and Men's Eyes (Sonnet 29)" (featuring Florence Welch and Ben de Vries)	3:07
11.	"Sonnet 129" (featuring William Shatner)	1:04
12.	"Th'Expense of Spirit in a Waste of Shame (Sonnet 129)" (featuring Anna Prohaska)	2:48
13.	"All dessen müd (Sonnet 66)" (featuring Christopher Nell and Jürgen Holtz)	8:23
14.	"A Woman's Face – Reprise (Sonnet 20)"	3:10
15.	"Sonnet 87" (featuring Inge Keller)	1:17
16.	"Farewell (Sonnet 87)" (featuring Anna Prohaska)	6:30

Track listing adapted from Universal Music Canada and Universal Music Group.

== Personnel ==
- Nicholai Baxter – acoustic guitar (10)
- BBC Symphony Orchestra conducted by Jayce Ogren (2, 5, 6, 12, 16)
- Berlin String Section (3, 8, 13, 14)
- Helena Bonham Carter – recitation (8)
- Dom Bouffard – guitar (8, 13)
- Hans-Jörn Brandenburg – piano (13)
- Hoon Sun Chae – cello
- Chris Chaney – bass guitar (3, 8, 10, 14)
- Uhjin Choi – viola
- Fiora Cutler – vocals (8)
- Ben de Vries – backing vocals (10)
- Marius de Vries – keyboard (3, 8, 10, 14), recitation (3), ROLI Seaboard (3)
- Peter Eyre – recitation (7)
- Carrie Fisher – recitation (9)
- Ralph Graessler – bass guitar (13)
- Jürgen Holtz – vocals (13)
- Frally Hynes – recitation (4)
- Inge Keller – recitation (15)
- Christopher Nell – vocals (13)
- Gary Novak – drums (8, 10)
- Ilzoo Park – violin
- Siân Phillips – recitation (1)
- Anna Prohaska – vocals (2, 5, 6, 12, 16)
- Stefan Rager – drums (13), percussion (8)
- William Shatner – recitation (11)
- Joel Shearer – guitar (8, 10)
- Martha Wainwright – vocals (8)
- Rufus Wainwright – backing vocals (10), vocals (3, 8, 13, 14)
- Florence Welch – vocals (10)
- Sophiemarie Yeoungchie Won – violin

Credits adapted from Universal Music Canada.

== Charts ==
Chart (2016)	Peak position
Belgian Albums (Ultratop Flanders)	89
Dutch Albums (Album Top 100)	53
Spanish Albums (Promusicae)	94
UK Compilations (OCC)	17
US Top Classical Albums (Billboard)	4

== See also ==
- Martha Wainwright discography
- When Love Speaks (2002), a compilation album featuring a recording of Sonnet 29 by Wainwright
- William Shatner's musical career
