= Ambur Braid =

Canadian opera singer

Ambur Dionne Braid
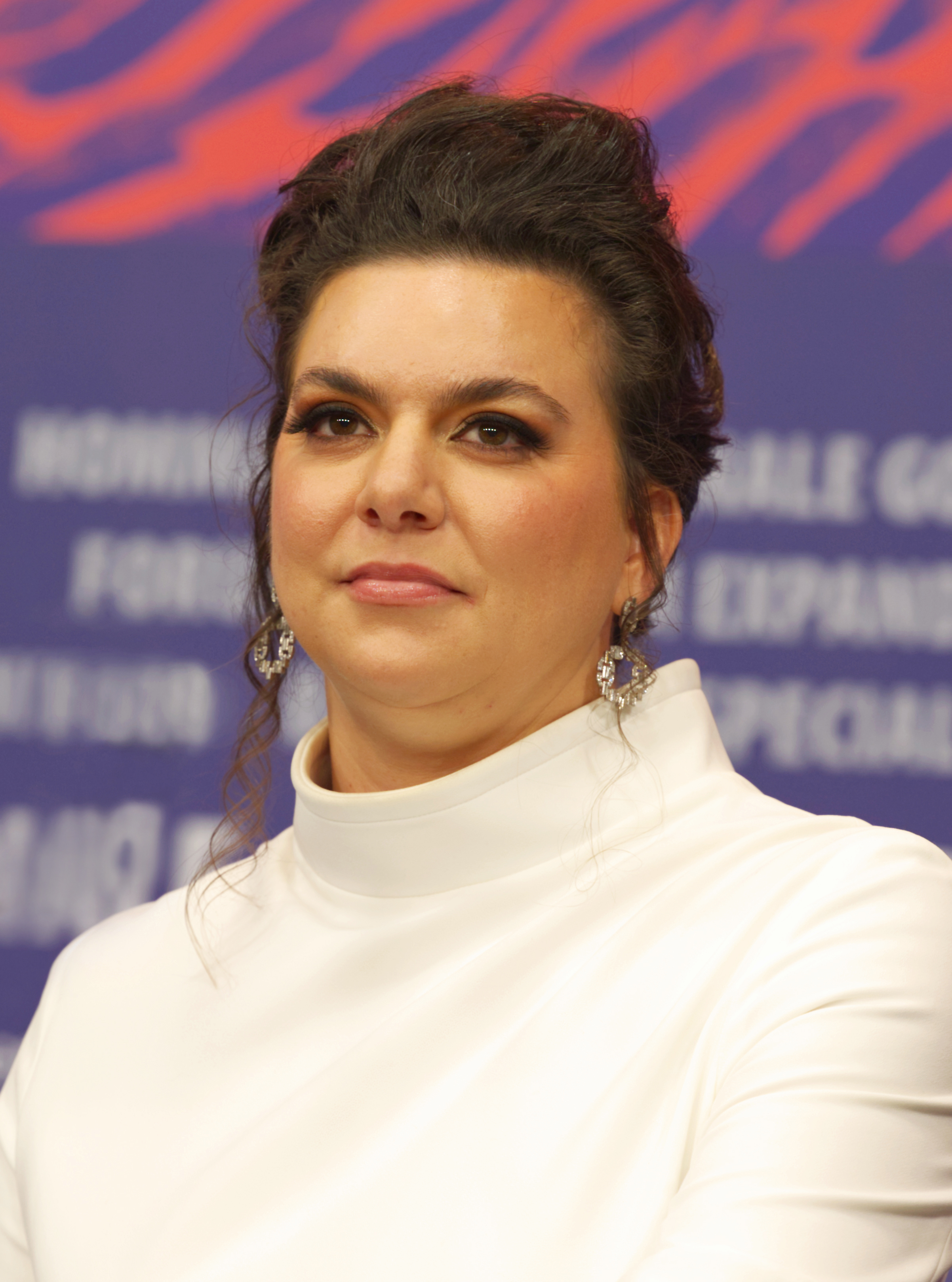
- Braid in 2024
- Born: Terrace, British Columbia, Canada
- Occupation: Operatic soprano
- Years active: 2009–present
- Website: amburbraid.com

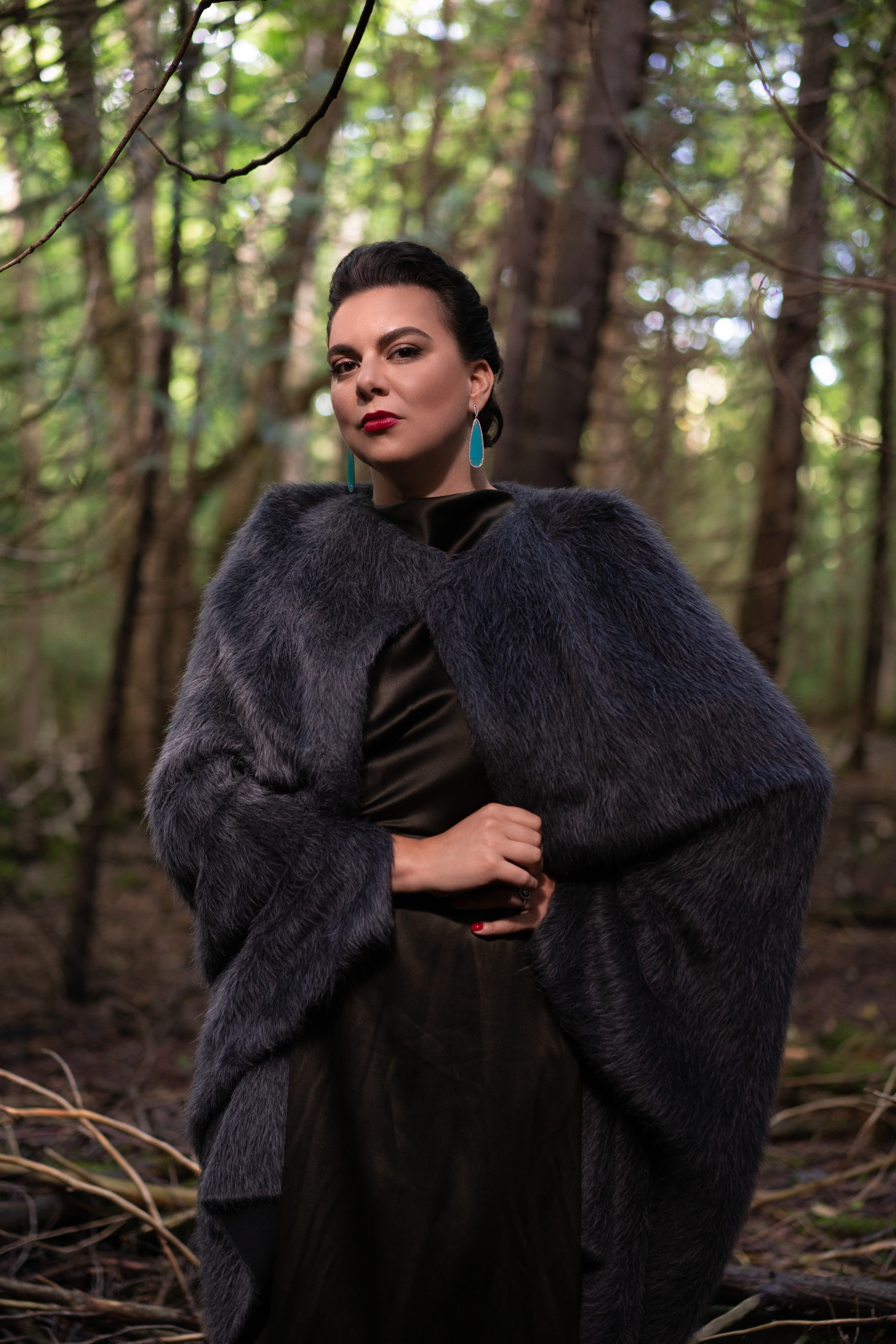
Canadian Opera Singer, Ambur Braid at home in Ontario, Canada.

Ambur Braid is a Canadian soprano.

== Early life and education ==
Braid was born in Terrace, British Columbia. She studied at The Royal Conservatory of Music Glenn Gould School with Donna Sherman from 2002 to 2006, where she achieved her Bachelor of Music and Artist Diploma in Voice Performance.

She then went on to study with Wendy Hillhouse at the San Francisco Conservatory of Music from 2006 to 2008, where she attained her Master of Music. She then continued her studies at Operaworks with Ann Baltz, the Opera Workshop in St. Andrews-By-The-Sea with Wendy Nielsen, the Canadian Opera Company Ensemble Studio (2010–2013) and the Ravinia Festival's Steans Institute (2012).

From 2014 to 2016, Braid moved to Athens, Greece, to work with Marina Krilovici on a repertoire shift to more dramatic soprano roles such as Salome (R. Strauss) and the title role in Puccini's Tosca.

== Career ==
After completing her Master of Music degree, Braid made her professional debut with Opera Atelier as Diane in Gluck's Iphigénie en Tauride in 2009.

As an alumna of the Canadian Opera Company's Ensemble Studio program, Braid has a close relationship with the company, having performed Amor in Gluck's Orfeo ed Euridice (2011), directed by Robert Carsen, conducted by Harry Bicket, the Queen of the Night in Mozart's The Magic Flute (2011, 2017), conducted by Johannes Debus, the Greek Woman in Iphigénie en Tauride (2011) conducted by Pablo Heras-Casado in a production by Robert Carsen, Handel's Semele (2012) conducted by Rinaldo Alessandrini, Adele in Die Fledermaus by J. Strauss (2012) directed by Christopher Alden, and Vitellia in Mozart's La Clemenza di Tito (2013) with the company.

Braid made her European debut in Lisbon in a new production of Stravinsky's The Rake's Progress as Anne Trulove, conducted by Joana Carneiro at Teatro Nacional de São Carlos (2015), and her UK opera debut at the English National Opera as the Queen of the Night directed by Simon McBurney in 2016. She made her US opera debut with the Arizona Opera in 2014 as Violetta in Verdi's La traviata.

From 2016 to 2018, Braid was appeared in various productions of The Magic Flute, at houses including Oper Frankfurt, Calgary Opera, and Canadian Opera Company. The 2016/17 and 2017/18 seasons also included multiple role debuts for her such as Dalinda in Handel's Ariodante (Canadian Opera Company), the Queen in Krenek's Das geheime Königreich (Oper Frankfurt), Elisabetta in Donizetti's Roberto Devereux (Oper Frankfurt), and Tosca (Calgary Opera). All debut performances were highly acclaimed, with reviews praising her for her emotional nuance, vocal power, and strong stage presence.

In the 2018/2019 season Braid sang in productions of Wagner’s Die Walküre (as Helmwige) and Maderna’s Satyricon (as Scintilla) at Oper Frankfurt.

A highlight of that season, Braid appeared in the role of Sabina in the world premiere of Rufus Wainwright’s Hadrian at the Canadian Opera Company, directed by Peter Hinton-Davis and conducted by Johannes Debus. The star-studded cast featured Thomas Hampson as Hadrian and Karita Mattila as Plotina in their company debuts.

In recent seasons, Braid returned to Oper Frankfurt to perform the title role in Barrie Kosky's new production of Salome (2020, conducted Joana Mallwitz) and reprise her role in Das geheimes Königreich.

Braid first performed Tosca in Europe in Andreas Kriegenburg’s production conducted by Carlo Montanaro for Oper Frankfurt, where she is a member of the ensemble, and returned to the Canadian Opera Company as Salome in Atom Egoyan's production under Johannes Debus.

Praised as an artist ‘one would always wish for but seldom find’ (Das Opernglas), recent highlights have included Braid's role and company debuts as both Eva in Schreker's Irrelohe for Opéra de Lyon and Stephana in Giordano's rarely performed Siberia for the Bregenzer Festspiele. In Frankfurt she gave her first performances as Bellini's Norma conducted by Erik Nielsen, as well as Ariadne auf Naxos conducted by Thomas Guggeis. Recent concert highlights have included Schmitt's La Tragédie de Salomé with Frankfurt Radio Symphony conducted by Alain Altinoglu and Beethoven's Ninth Symphony with National Arts Centre Orchestra, Ottawa.

== Other work ==
A strong advocate for attracting younger audiences to classical arts, Braid is a believer in all forms of collaborative art and has performed with Broken Social Scene, The Arkells, Austra, Dragonette, and The Sam Roberts Band.

During the COVID-19 pandemic, Braid began an outdoor concert festival Opera in the Wild, in an effort to feature local, Canadian talent and emerging young artists.

Braid also collaborated on the Starry Opera Night (2020) project with musician/producer Dan Kurtz and designer Isaac Rayment. This immersive event utilised projections from the Van Gogh projection installation in Toronto.

== Film ==
Braid is featured in the 2017 film The Upside, starring Bryan Cranston and Kevin Hart, as well as the 2025 film Seven Veils (film), starring Amanda Seyfried.

== Recognition and awards ==
- 2013: Third Prize, Christina and Louis Quilico Awards
- 2008: Winner San Francisco Conservatory Concerto Competition
- 2006: Palm Beach Opera, Junior Division
