= Andrew Ondrejcak =

American dramatist

- Born: Hattiesburg, Mississippi, U.S.
- Education: Savanah College of Art and Design; Brooklyn College
- Occupations: Playwright, director, filmmaker
- Writing career
- Period: Contemporary
- Website: Official website

Andrew Ondrejcak is an American artist who makes interdisciplinary work at the intersection of film, fashion and theater. He writes, directs, and designs original performances and films that have been produced in the U.S. and internationally. His design work crosses into the fashion industry as the creative director of special live events for luxury fashion brands.

== Background ==
Ondrejcak was born and raised in Hattiesburg, Mississippi and studied architecture and set design at the Savannah College of Art and Design, then playwriting at Brooklyn College, where he studied under playwright Mac Wellman and performance artist Vito Acconci.

== Career ==
Starting in 2008, Ondrejcak assisted artist Robert Wilson at the Watermill Center. In 2010, he reperformed the work of Marina Abramovic The Artist Is Present at MoMA.

He has taught design and theatre workshops at Domaine de Boisbuchet in Lessac, France and, from 2003 - 2013, was a freelance lecturer at the Museum of Modern Art.

In 2013, Vivienne Westwood introduced Ondrejcak to the Ethical Fashion Initiative, a subsidiary of the International Trade Centre which is a joint agency of the United Nations and the WTO. This began a 2015-2020 collaboration during which Ondrejcak worked with artisans in Mali, Burkina Faso, Afghanistan and Haiti on the costumes for a series of original theater works: Elijah Green (2016), Landscape with Figures (2019), Figure Studies (2018), and contributed to The Future is Here and I am It: A Parade to Mark the Moment (2019) by Carrie Mae Weems.

In 2017, a commission by the Los Angeles-based charity Art of Elysium to write a series of music videos in honor of Stevie Wonder led Ondrejcak into filmmaking. His subsequent short films link art historical objects and artifacts with contemporary iconography, often putting a queer perspective on a classical form.

He has been an Artist in Residence at the Park Avenue Armory, The Watermill Center, Governor's Island, Baryshnikov Arts Center, Yaddo, Josef and Anni Albers Foundation’s Thread in Senegal, and MacDowell.

== Works ==
=== Live performance ===
Ondrejcak's performance works bring together theater, dance and music and include performers from a variety of artistic backgrounds, ages and nationalities. His performance have been presented by the Metropolitan Museum of Art; Brooklyn Academy of Music; Holland Festival; Kampnagel; The Kitchen; Ontological-Hysteric Theater; Beaux Arts Museum, Brussels; REDCAT; The Kennedy Center; Contemporary Art Center, New Orleans; Schumannfest, Dusseldorf; Under the Radar Festival at the Public Theater; HERE Arts Center; Carolina Performing Arts; SCAD Museum of Art; Solomon R. Guggenheim Works & Process.

- Dead Songs: Lust & Longing (2025)
- Landscape with Figures (2019)
- The Muses (2019)
- Figure Studies (2018)
- Elijah Green (2016)
- You Us We All (2015) with composer Shara Nova
- Feast (2014)
- Veneration 2 (2013)
- Disco (anti) (2013), curated by Bryce Dessner
- Veneration 1 (2010), curated by Robert Wilson

=== Short films and music videos ===
- Screen Test: Isabel (2023), a Midnight Moment at Times Square Arts Alliance
- The Actress (2020), SCAD Museum of Art, featuring Isabel Sandoval
- The Story and The Writer (2018) Document Journal, narrated by Tilda Swinton
- The Sword of Damocles (2018), Rolling Stone Magazine, featuring Darren Criss and Rufus Wainwright
- Dido's Lament (2018), featuring Gottmik, Nowness
- Objet d'Art (2018), Nowness
- Aukland (2018), for Ben Lanz of The National
- The Three Graces (2018), for Out Magazine
- Signed, Sealed, Delivered I'm Yours (2017), a series of videos honoring Stevie Wonder featuring James Franco, Rufus Wainwright, and Shepard Fairey.
