= Trouble in Paradise (Rufus Wainwright song) =

Single by Rufus Wainwright
- Released: October 24, 2019
- Genre: Pop; pop rock
- Label: BMG
- Producer(s): Mitchell Froom

Rufus Wainwright singles chronology
"Sword of Damocles" (2018)	"Trouble in Paradise" (2019)	"Damsel in Distress" (2020)

"Trouble in Paradise" is a song by American-Canadian singer-songwriter Rufus Wainwright, released on October 24, 2019, as the lead single of his upcoming studio album, slated for release by BMG in 2020. The track was produced by Mitchell Froom. A music video directed by Mia Donovan was released to promote the song on November 5, 2019.

== Composition ==
"Trouble in Paradise" is a pop song about the fashion industry with "general themes applied to the world at large". He sings, "There's always trouble in paradise/ Don't matter if your drinks are neat or on ice/ There's always trouble in paradise/ Don't matter if you're good or bad or mean or awfully nice."

Wainwright said of the song: "A little older, a little wiser, but raring to go, I am excited to re-ignite the darker sensibilities of song matched with a musical sense of humor. 'Trouble in Paradise' is my first offering on this typically intense Wainwright journey. We are in the deep end baby." In a press release, he said the music has "a sense of sophistication and an animalistic instinct", noting, "After the opera world and natural aging, I can now sing at the full power of my abilities, and this record really shows that off." Wainwright also shared a song synopsis in a post for his website about the upcoming album:

Drum beats herald a romp through the inner mind of a bob-haired fashion doyenne on her drive from the town to the country. She reflects on the true price of glamour, and weighs its spiritual costs while eyeing her future legacy, and eternity. The music, a nod to solid pop rock production of previous classic LA era's motors the listener on with both a sense of sophistication and an animalistic instinct.

== Release ==
"Trouble in Paradise" was released in October 2019 as the lead single of Wainwright's upcoming studio album. The song's release marks Wainwright's first pop song since his 2012 album Out of the Game, his first single under BMG, and his first collaboration with Froom.

== Reception ==
Jon Blistein of Rolling Stone described "Trouble in Paradise" as a "clever new pop romp" and wrote, "Over lush pop rock orchestration reminiscent of Billy Joel, Wainwright saunters through a vocal performance that lends a lavish edge to his wry lyrics." Attitude magazine said the song "taps into 2019's tense zeitgeist as Wainwright muses on the fronts we all create for ourselves", and The Times said it has "soaring harmonies and woozy romanticism". Music Week's Ben Homewood wrote, "Crisp drum thwacks and a sweeping arrangement herald the first new music in seven years from Rufus Wainwright, who sounds sublime here."

"Trouble in Paradise" was KCMP's song of the day for October 29, 2019. WXPN's Bruce Warren called the track "a wonderful new song that showcases [Wainwright's] beautiful, rich voice, and penchant for writing ornate pop songs".

== Music video ==
A music video for the song, directed by Canadian photographer and filmmaker Mia Donovan, was released on November 5, 2019.

== Charts ==
Chart (2020)	Peak position
Belgium (Ultratip Bubbling Under Flanders)	40
