= Jörn Weisbrodt =

German arts administrator (born 1973)

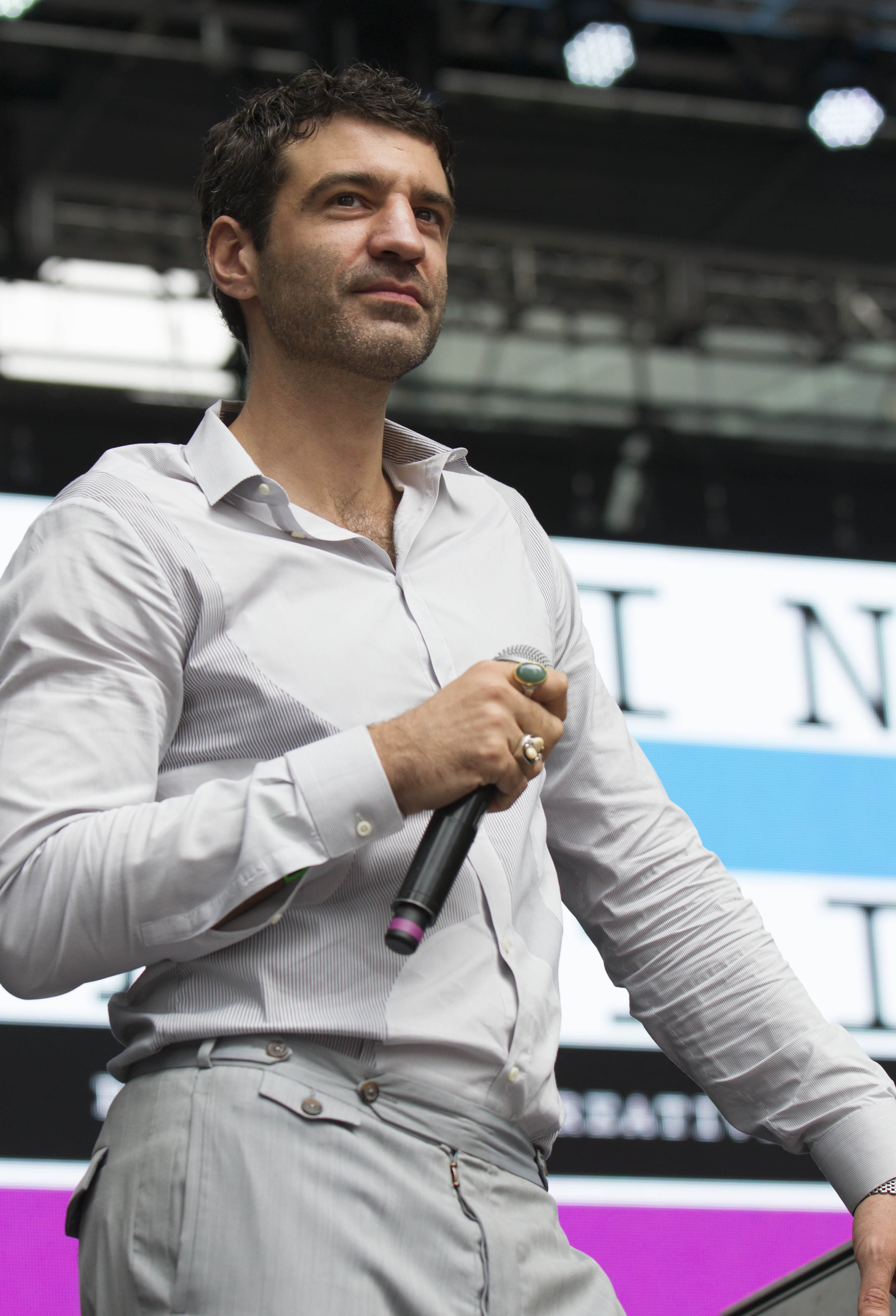
- Weisbrodt in 2013
- Born: 26 January 1973 (age 53); Hamburg, West Germany
- Occupations: Arts administrator and singer
- Spouse: Rufus Wainwright (m. 2012)
- Children: 1

Jörn Weisbrodt (born 26 January 1973) is a German arts administrator, singer, and former artistic director of the Luminato Festival, Toronto's annual Festival of Arts and Creativity. He is currently the artistic director of ALL ARTS, a streaming platform and broadcast channel from WNET.

== Early life and education ==
Weisbrodt was born in Hamburg and studied opera direction at the Hanns Eisler Music Conservatory in Berlin, graduating in 2000. While still a student, he worked closely with directors Ruth Berghaus, Heiner Müller, Peter Stein, Peter Konwitschny and Robert Wilson. He became Wilson's personal assistant and also interned at The Watermill Center, Wilson's Performance Laboratory on Long Island, New York. It was here that Weisbrodt decided he would rather be an arts facilitator—"I realized that I wasn't an artist; I was an enabler of artists”.

== Career ==
After his graduation, Weisbrodt worked for management consulting firm McKinsey & Company and held a number of positions in Germany, including assistant director at Deutsches Theater, co-founder of Zwischenpalastnutzung and Artistic Production Director at the Berlin State Opera.

In 2006, Weisbrodt moved to the United States to become executive director of Robert Wilson's company RW Work Ltd. and Director of the Watermill Center. At Watermill he was responsible for developing inter-disciplinary performances and installations and establishing new partnerships with, among others, the Guggenheim Museum, the Baryshnikov Arts Center, Moscow Biennale, Kampnagel Hamburg, the Donaufestival, the Massachusetts Museum of Contemporary Art, the Purnati Center for the Arts in Indonesia and Columbia University. He also oversaw the launch of a residency for emerging international artists.

Weisbrodt has an international reputation for collaborating with some of the world's leading arts organizations, including La Scala in Milan, the Spoleto Festival, the Barbican Centre in London, the Bolshoi Theatre, the Lincoln Center Festival, the Salzburg Festival and the Manchester International Festival.

In 2018, Weisbrodt was appointed artistic director of ALL ARTS, WNET's new streaming platform and broadcast channel.

== Luminato Festival ==
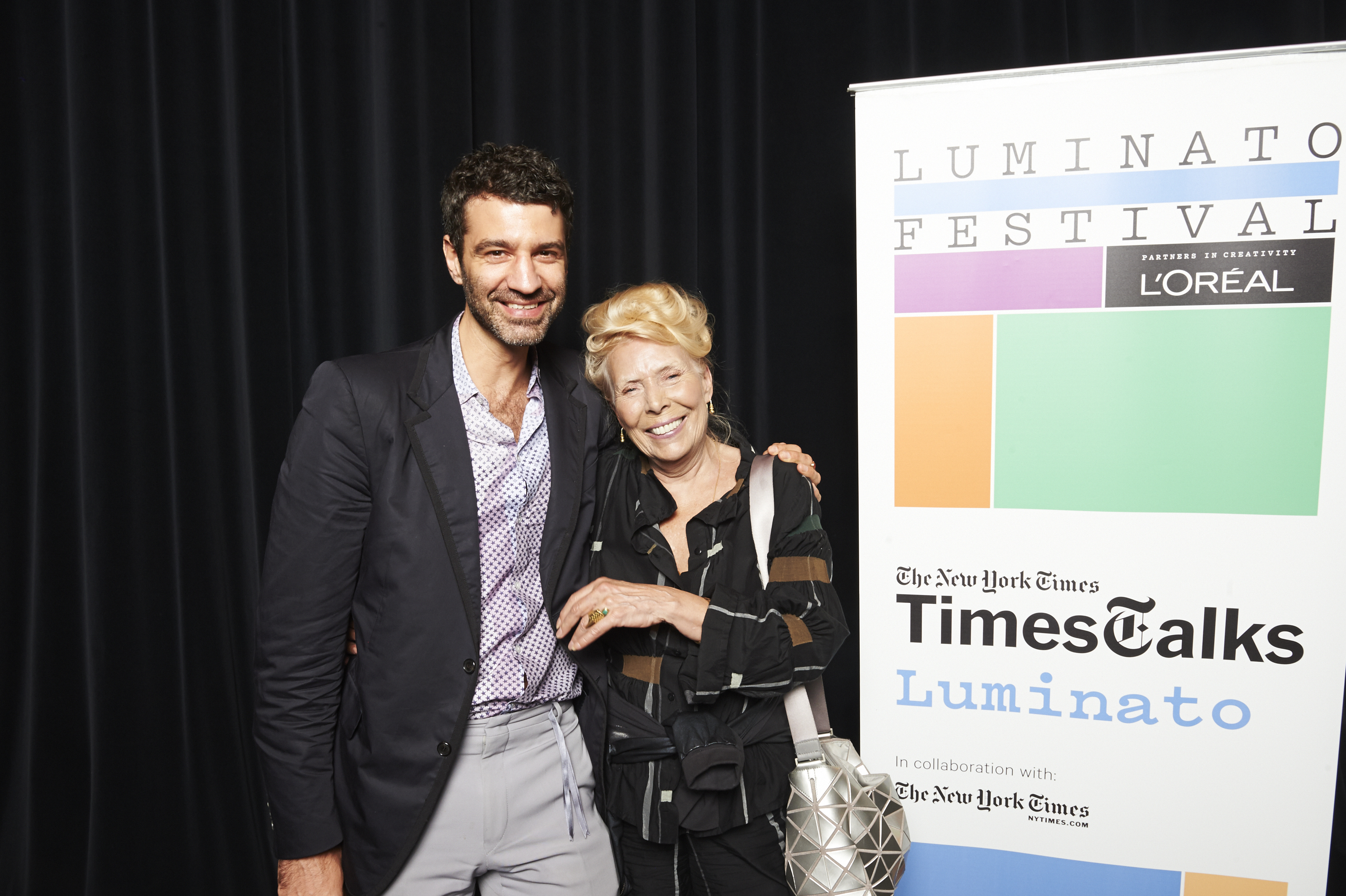
Weisbrodt and Joni Mitchell at the Luminato Festival in June 2013

Weisbrodt first collaborated with Luminato to host the North American premiere of Rufus Wainwright's opera Prima Donna (2010) and the revival of Robert Wilson's production of Philip Glass' opera Einstein on the Beach (2012). He was the Festival's Artistic Director from January 2012 to July 2016.

Luminato has encompassed all creative fields from music to theatre, dance, literature, visual arts, film, magic and food. Weisbrodt's vision for the Festival was to create connections between the disciplines and promote collaborations between artists from different fields. He stated, “I don't think a festival today should just invite productions from the international or national touring circuit; it should encourage artists to create something new.” He also stressed the importance of pre-performance talks, artist interviews and community outreach in order to better engage a modern audience.

Luminato's program of events during Weisbrodt's appointment included the North American premiere of Robert Lepage's Playing Cards: SPADES, Joni Mitchell's 70th birthday tribute concert A Portrait in Song, the North American premiere of Robert Wilson's The Life and Death of Marina Abramović and the world premiere of Marina Abramović Institute—Prototype, the world premiere of Ronnie Burkett's Daisy Theatre, Pina Bausch's Kontakthof by Tanztheater Wuppertal, a retrospective of avant-garde artist Matthew Barney, the world premiere of Kid Koala's Nufonia Must Fall, the world premieres of Terence Koh's tomorrow's snow and a way to the light, the Canadian premiere of Paradisiacal Rites by Saint Genet and the world premiere of If I Loved You: Gentlemen Prefer Broadway—An Evening of Love Duets.

Weisbrodt believed that Toronto was on the verge of becoming a city of global and cultural importance and that the Festival could attract artists to live and work in it—”I would love to be [...] part of making something really extraordinary here,” he said.

== Personal life ==
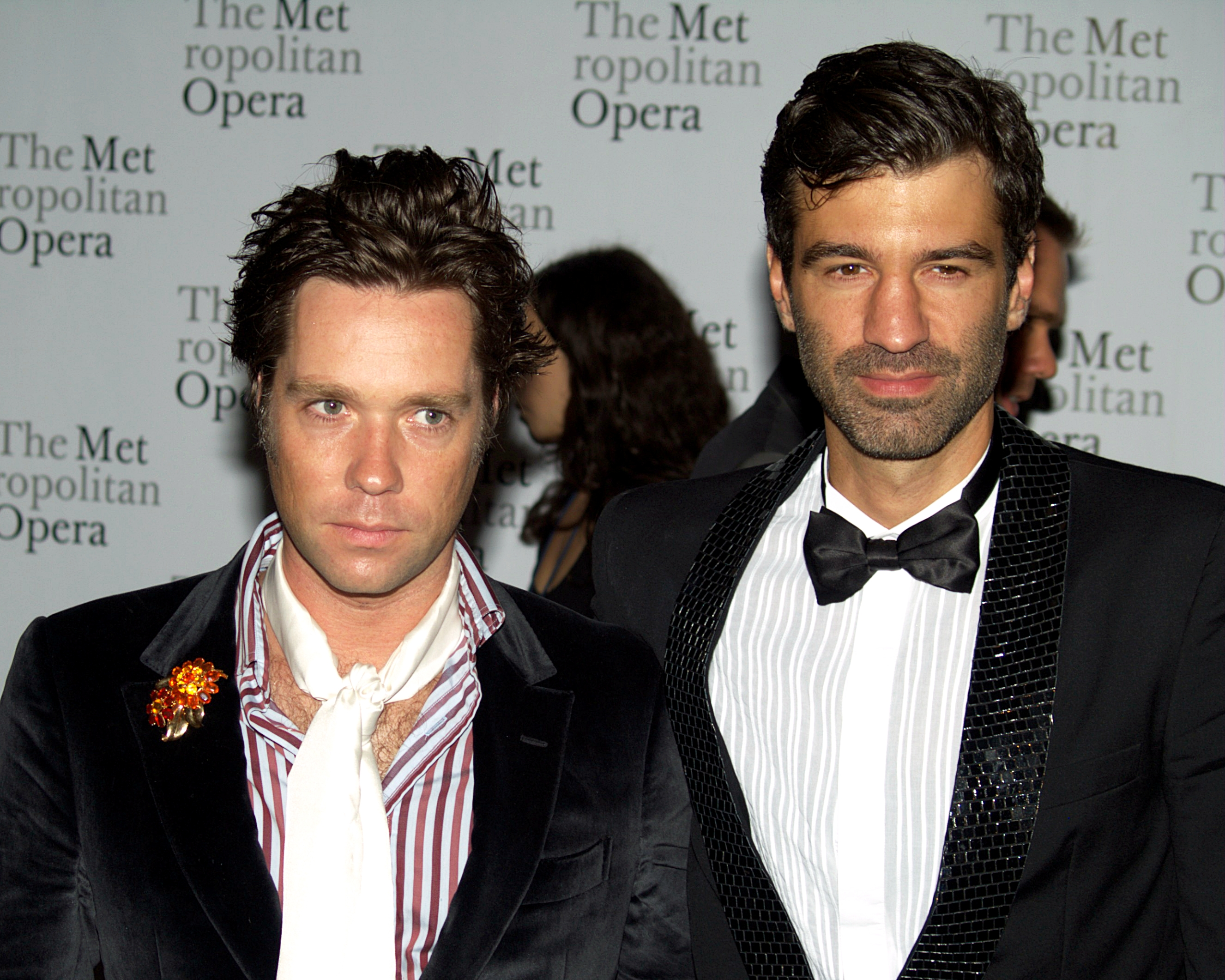
Weisbrodt and his husband Rufus Wainwright, in 2010.

Weisbrodt married his partner, singer-songwriter and composer Rufus Wainwright, in Montauk, Long Island, in August 2012. They have a daughter, in a "parenting partnership" with friend Lorca Cohen, daughter of Leonard Cohen.
