= Hadrian (opera) =

2018 opera by Rufus Wainwright

- Opera by Rufus Wainwright
- Librettist: Daniel MacIvor
- Language: English
- Premiere: 13 October 2018; Four Seasons Centre Toronto, ON

Hadrian is an opera composed by American-Canadian singer-songwriter Rufus Wainwright, with a libretto by Daniel MacIvor, based on the life of Hadrian (76–138 AD), Roman emperor from 117 to 138. First staged by the Canadian Opera Company, the opera premiered October 13, 2018, at the Four Seasons Centre in Toronto, directed by Peter Hinton-Davis.

== Background and development ==
Hadrian is Wainwright's second opera, following Prima Donna, which premiered at the Manchester International Festival in 2009. Wainwright was inspired by Marguerite Yourcenar's Memoirs of Hadrian (1951) and began composing Hadrian before Prima Donna. However, lacking the confidence to "navigate all the emotional possibilities" that Hadrian would require, he concentrated his efforts on Prima Donna as his first opera production. On March 21, 2018, Cincinnati Opera and CCM Opera's joint Opera Fusion: New Works program presented excerpts from Hadrian and answered questions about the upcoming production.

== Description ==
The opera in four acts focuses on Hadrian's relationship with Antinous, who has drowned. According to Wainwright and MacIvor, "You've got everything. A big chorus, lots of characters, the Nile... a love story... a political story... all the elements of traditional grand opera." MacIvor has also said of the opera: "The mystery of why Hadrian's remarkable love for Antinous – underlined by his bottomless grief – has not been celebrated widely as a model of eros points to a fear of same-sex love that has changed little from his age to ours. The deeper I delve into Hadrian's world and his time, the more parallels I see to how we live today."

== Roles ==
Principal roles, as portrayed by the original cast members.

- Hadrian: Thomas Hampson
- Antinous: Isaiah Bell
- Sabina: Ambur Braid
- Turbo: David Leigh
- Plotina: Karita Mattila
- Trajan: Roger Honeywell

== See also ==
- Homosexuality in ancient Rome
