= Damsel in Distress (song) =

Single by Rufus Wainwright

from the album Unfollow the Rules
- Released: February 27, 2020
- Length: 4:42
- Label: BMG
- Songwriter: Rufus Wainwright

Rufus Wainwright singles chronology
"Trouble in Paradise" (2019)	"Damsel in Distress" (2020)	"Peaceful Afternoon" (2020)

"Damsel in Distress" is a song by Rufus Wainwright. On February 27, 2020, the song was released as the second single for his ninth studio album Unfollow the Rules, released by BMG in April 2020.

== Composition ==
Wainwright wrote the song to honor Joni Mitchell. He said, "My husband and I now live in Laurel Canyon. I wasn't that familiar with Joni's music but Jörn [Weisbrodt] became obsessed and took me on a journey into her music. We ended up hanging out with her and I get now why she's one of the greats. So it's part Laurel Canyon, part a song about a personal relationship that I'm trying to come to terms with, but mostly my Mitchell virginity being broken."

== Music video ==
The song's animated music video features "a woman in bellbottoms sauntering through landscapes with the song's lyrics displayed in the clouds".

== Track listing ==
Stream

1. "Damsel in Distress" – 4:42
2. "Trouble in Paradise" – 3:05
