= Rufus Wainwright =

Canadian-American singer-songwriter (born 1973)

- Wainwright at the 2026 Sundance Film Festival
- Born: Rufus McGarrigle Wainwright; July 22, 1973 (age 53); Rhinebeck, New York, U.S.
- Spouse: Jörn Weisbrodt (m. 2012)
- Children: 1
- Parents: Loudon Wainwright III; Kate McGarrigle
- Relatives: Martha Wainwright (sister); Lucy Wainwright Roche (half-sister); Sloan Wainwright (paternal aunt); Anna McGarrigle (maternal aunt); Loudon Wainwright Jr. (paternal grandfather)
- Musical career
- Genres: Baroque pop; art pop; pop rock; soft rock; indie pop; indie rock; opera
- Instruments: Vocals; keyboards; guitar
- Years active: 1988–present
- Labels: Geffen; DreamWorks
- Website: rufuswainwright.com

Signature
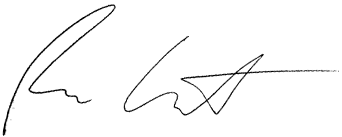

Rufus McGarrigle Wainwright (born July 22, 1973) is a Canadian and American singer, songwriter, and composer. He has recorded eleven studio albums and numerous tracks on compilations and film soundtracks. He has also written two classical operas and set Shakespeare's sonnets to music for a theatre piece by Robert Wilson.

Wainwright's self-titled debut album was released through DreamWorks Records in May 1998. His second album, Poses, was released in June 2001. Wainwright's third and fourth studio albums, Want One (2003) and Want Two (2004), were repackaged as the double album Want in 2005. In 2007, Wainwright released his fifth studio album, Release the Stars, and his first live album, Rufus Does Judy at Carnegie Hall.

His second live album, Milwaukee at Last!!!, was released in 2009, followed by the studio albums All Days Are Nights: Songs for Lulu (2010) and Out of the Game (2012). The double album Prima Donna (2015) was a recording of his opera of the same name. His ninth studio album, Take All My Loves: 9 Shakespeare Sonnets (2016), featured nine adaptions of Shakespeare's sonnets. Rufus' 10th studio album, Unfollow the Rules, was released on July 20, 2020. His eleventh, Folkocracy, was released on June 2, 2023.

Wainwright is the son of musicians Loudon Wainwright III and Kate McGarrigle, the older brother of singer Martha Wainwright, the half-brother of singer-songwriter Lucy Wainwright Roche, the nephew of singer-songwriters Sloan Wainwright (paternal) and Anna McGarrigle (maternal), and the grandson of writer Loudon Wainwright Jr..

== Early life ==
Wainwright was born in Rhinebeck, New York, to folk singers Kate McGarrigle and Loudon Wainwright III. His parents divorced when he was three, and he lived with his mother in Montreal, Canada, for most of his youth. His father is a descendant of Peter Stuyvesant, the 17th-century Dutch governor of New Amsterdam, later New York. Wainwright has dual US and Canadian citizenship. He attended high school at the Millbrook School in New York (which would later inspire his song "Millbrook"), and later briefly studied piano at McGill University in Montreal.

He began playing the piano at age six, and started touring at age 13 with "The McGarrigle Sisters and Family", a folk group featuring Rufus, his sister Martha, his mother Kate, and aunt Anna. His song "I'm a-Runnin'", which he performed in the film Tommy Tricker and the Stamp Traveller at the age of 14, earned him a nomination for a 1989 Genie Award for Best Original Song. He was nominated for a 1990 Juno Award for Most Promising Male Vocalist of the Year.

Wainwright came out as gay in his teens. In 1999, he told Rolling Stone that his father recognized his homosexuality early on. "We'd drive around in the car, he'd play 'Heart of Glass' and I'd sort of mouth the words, pretend to be Blondie. Just a sign of many other things to come as well." Wainwright later said in another interview that his parents "could not even handle me being gay. We never talked about it really."

Wainwright became interested in opera during his adolescent years, and the genre strongly influences his music. For example, the song "Barcelona" features lyrics from the libretto of Giuseppe Verdi's opera Macbeth. During that time, he became interested in Édith Piaf, Al Jolson, and Judy Garland. As a youth he trained at Interlochen Arts Camp, studying classical music.

At age 14, Wainwright was raped in London's Hyde Park after picking up a man at a bar. In an interview years later, he described the event: "I said I wanted to go to the park and see where this big concert was going on. I thought it was going to be a romantic walk in the park, but he raped me and robbed me afterwards and tried to strangle me". Wainwright states that he survived only by pretending to be an epileptic and faking a seizure. He has been reported to have stated that he remained celibate for five or seven years after the incident, but eventually became promiscuous.

== Career ==
=== 1995-1999: Rise to fame, debut album ===
Throughout the summer of 1995, Wainwright played weekly shows at Cafe Sarajevo in Montreal. Eventually, he cut a series of demo tapes produced by Pierre Marchand, who later produced Wainwright's second album Poses. The resulting tapes impressed Wainwright's father Loudon, who passed them on to family friend and musician Van Dyke Parks. Parks then in turn sent the recordings to DreamWorks Records executive Lenny Waronker, who signed Wainwright to the label in 1996.

The singer moved to New York City in 1996, performing regularly at Club Fez. He relocated to Los Angeles that year and began his first studio album, 1998's Rufus Wainwright. Waronker paired Wainwright with producer Jon Brion, and the two spent most of 1996 and 1997 making the record. Wainwright recorded 56 songs in total, on 62 rolls of tape. The sessions cost $700,000.

Wainwright's self-titled debut received critical acclaim; Rolling Stone recognized it as one of the best albums of the year, and named the singer Best New Artist of the year. Wainwright was nominated for four awards by the Gay & Lesbian American Music Awards, including Album of the Year, Pop Recording of the Year and Video of the Year, and won for Best New Artist. Rufus Wainwright won a GLAAD Media Award for Outstanding Music Album and a Juno Award for Best Alternative Album. However, commercial success of the album was limited; the debut failed to chart in any country, though he ranked No. 24 on Billboard's Top Heatseekers chart.

Wainwright toured with Sean Lennon in 1998 and began his first headline tour later that year. In December 1998, he appeared in a Gap commercial directed by Phil Harder, performing Frank Loesser's "What Are You Doing New Year's Eve?". In March 1999, Wainwright began a headlining tour in Hoboken, New Jersey.

=== 2000-2006: Poses and Want ===
Wainwright lived in the Chelsea Hotel in New York City for six months, during which he wrote most of his second album. On June 5, 2001, Wainwright's second album, Poses, was released to critical acclaim but limited sales. The album ranked No. 117 on the Billboard 200 and No. 1 on the Top Heatseekers chart. Poses won a GLAAD Media Award for Outstanding Music Album and a Juno Award for Best Alternative Album, and was nominated by the Juno Awards for Best Songwriter ("Poses" / "Cigarettes and Chocolate Milk" / "Grey Gardens"). From 2001 to 2004, he toured with Tori Amos, Sting, Ben Folds, and Guster, as well as headlining the 2001 and 2002 tour in support of the album.

Wainwright became addicted to crystal meth in the early 2000s and temporarily lost his vision. His addiction reached its peak in 2002, during what he described as "the most surreal week of my life". During that week, he played a cameo role in the UK comedy television program Absolutely Fabulous, spent several nights partying with George W. Bush's daughter Barbara, enjoyed a "debauched evening" with his mother and Marianne Faithfull, sang with Anohni of Antony and the Johnsons for Zaldy's spring 2003 collection, and experienced recurring hallucinations of his father throughout. He decided after that he "was either going to rehab or I was going to live with my father. I knew I needed an asshole to yell at me, and I felt he fitted the bill." He subsequently spent a month in a rehab facility in Minnesota.

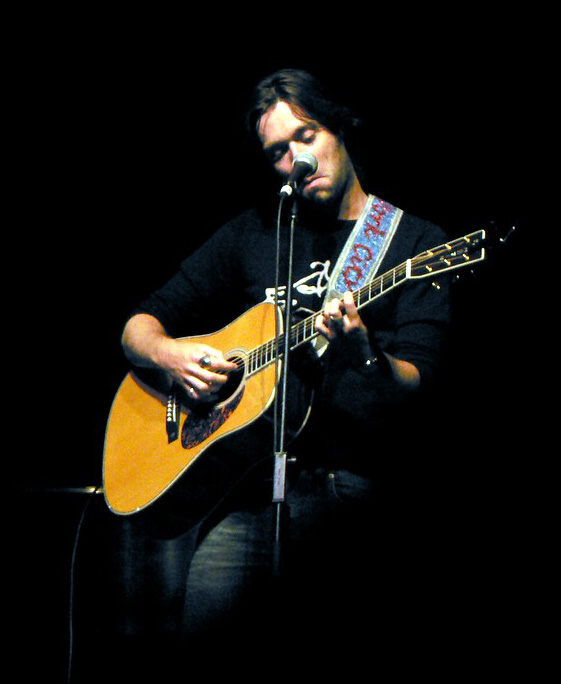
Wainwright in concert in Chicago

In 2003, Rufus released the full-length album Want One. Then Wainwright's album Want Two, from which four songs were released as the EP Waiting for a Want, was released by DreamWorks/Geffen on November 16, 2004. The live iTunes Sessions EP titled Alright, Already: Live in Montréal was released on March 15, 2005. A DVD titled All I Want, featuring a biographical documentary, music videos, and live performances, was released internationally in 2005. That same year, Wainwright made two major contributions as a solo vocalist to a pair of records: the Mercury Prize-winning Antony and the Johnsons' I Am a Bird Now and Burt Bacharach's At This Time.

Want One and Want Two were repackaged as Want for a November 2005 release to coincide with the beginning of a British tour. This version of Want One contains two extra songs: "Es Muß Sein" and "Velvet Curtain Rag". The Want package in the UK has two bonus tracks: "Chelsea Hotel No. 2" (a Leonard Cohen cover) and "In With the Ladies", which replace "Coeur de parisienne – Reprise d'Arletty" and "Quand vous mourez de nos amours" from 2004's augmented edition.

=== 2007-2011: Release the Stars and Rufus Does Judy at Carnegie Hall ===
Wainwright's fifth studio album, Release the Stars, was released by Geffen on May 15, 2007. The album was produced by Wainwright and featured Richard Thompson, friend Teddy Thompson, sister Martha Wainwright, mother Kate McGarrigle, Neil Tennant, Joan Wasser, Julianna Raye, Larry Mullins (also known as Toby Dammit), and actress Siân Phillips. It reached No. 2 on the UK Albums Chart, and debuted at No. 23 on the Billboard 200. The first single, "Going to a Town", was released on April 3, 2007, in the iTunes Music Store. The second single released was "Rules and Regulations", and the third single was a 500-copy (12" vinyl) release of "Tiergarten", a one-track EP with the Supermayer remix of Tiergarten, which was released exclusively through iTunes and 7digital on October 29.

Rufus Wainwright: "Banks of the Wabash" (1997)
30-second sample of Rufus Wainwright singing a cover of Paul Dresser's "On the Banks of the Wabash, Far Away" (1897) for the soundtrack to the 1997 film The Myth of Fingerprints.

Two music videos were released for the album: "Going to a Town", directed by Sophie Muller, and "Rules and Regulations", directed by Petro Papahadjopoulos and styled by J.W. Anderson. Release the Stars was certified gold in the UK. The accompanying world tour saw Wainwright visit North America, Europe, Asia, and Australia, ending on February 14, 2008, with a concert at the Radio City Music Hall in New York City.

On June 10, 2006, NPR's Weekend Edition Saturday broadcast an interview of Wainwright by Scott Simon. The segment concerned Wainwright's sold-out pair of Carnegie Hall shows on June 14 and 15, 2006 in which he performed the entire Judy Garland concert album that was recorded there in 1961. He later repeated his performance at the London Palladium, the Paris Olympia, and the Hollywood Bowl in Los Angeles. Live CD and DVD recordings of the concerts were released on December 4, 2007. The DVD is titled Rufus! Rufus! Rufus! Does Judy! Judy! Judy!: Live from the London Palladium. The CD album, Rufus Does Judy at Carnegie Hall, is a recording of his show at the New York venue. In 2008, Garland's daughter Lorna Luft expressed strong approval of Wainwright's recordings of her mother's songs. The album was nominated for a 2009 Grammy Award for Best Traditional Pop Vocal Album.

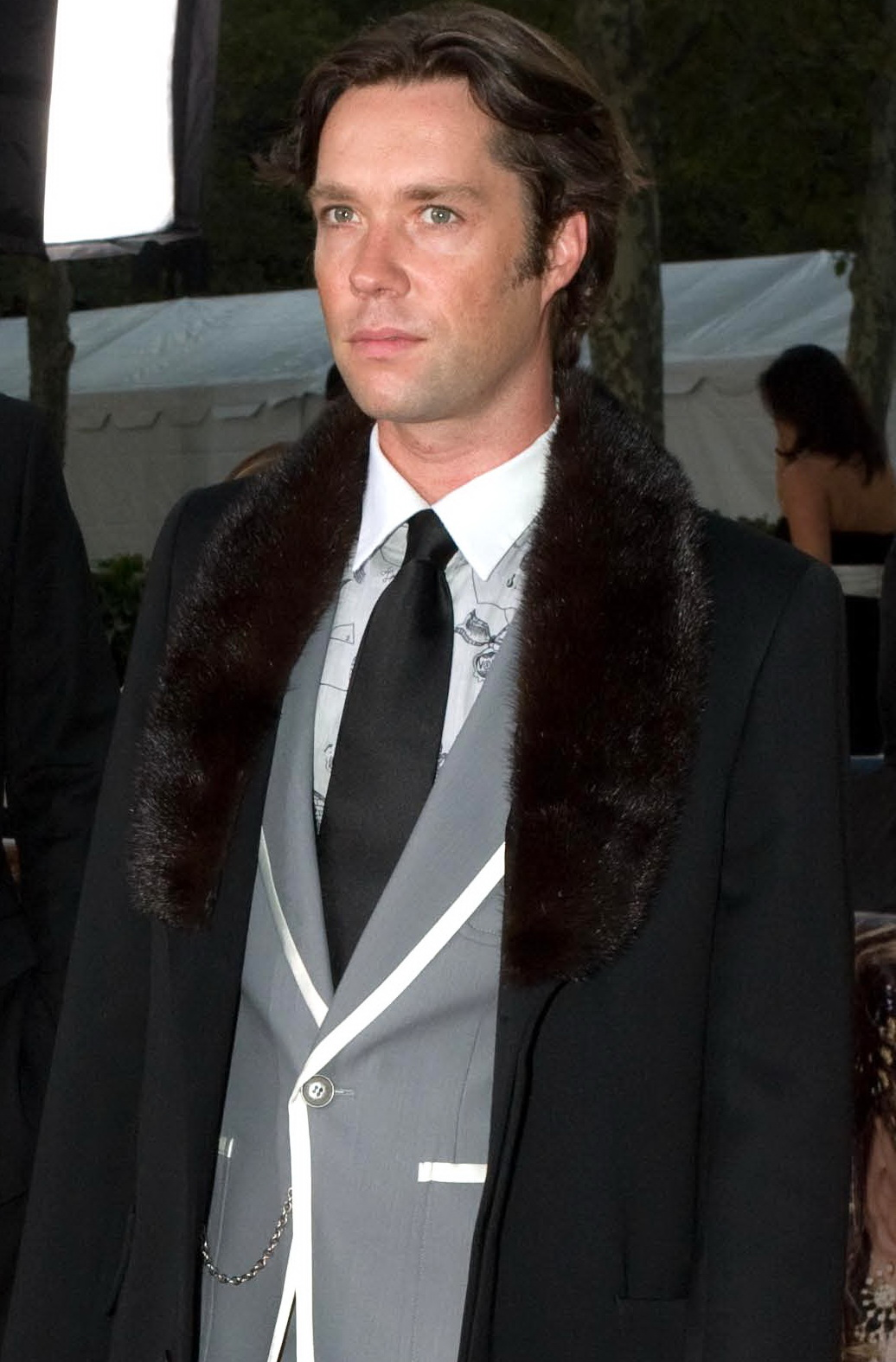
Wainwright in 2008

Wainwright created the concept of Blackoutsabbath in early 2008. In an attempt to become more environmentally conscious, participants are asked to live "off the grid" as much as possible on a designated date by unplugging appliances, walking or cycling for transportation, turning out lights and decreasing energy usage in any other ways possible.

As the sun sets on the evening of Blackoutsabbath, participants write ways they can contribute to the Earth's well-being throughout the rest of the year. Annual benefit concerts take place to raise awareness of the cause. Special guests performing at the concert included Joan Wasser, Jenni Muldaur, and friend and fellow singer-songwriter Teddy Thompson. The organization's official site contains updates about the program and contains links to various tools, green products and services, studies, and groups that promote energy conservation and environmental protection.

In December 2008 Rufus performed alongside his sister, Martha Wainwright, and mother, Kate McGarrigle, as well as many more of his family at the Knitting Factory in downtown Manhattan. Joined by other artists such as Emmylou Harris, Lou Reed, and Laurie Anderson, the cast performed original and traditional Christmas-themed songs. In November 2009 Revelation Films released the concert on DVD.

Following his 2007–08 tour, Wainwright began writing his first opera, Prima Donna, about "a day in the life of an opera singer", anxiously preparing for her comeback, who falls in love with a journalist. There are four characters, and the libretto is in French. The opera was originally commissioned by Metropolitan Opera general manager Peter Gelb. However, because of a dispute over Wainwright's decision to write the libretto in French and the Met's inability to schedule an opening in the 2009 season, Wainwright and the Met ended their relationship. Instead of a New York opening, Prima Donna was staged during the Manchester International Festival, where the first performance took place at the Palace Theatre on July 10, 2009. Reviews for the performance were mixed, with one publication suggesting Wainwright "may struggle to convince critics he is worthy of a place among the greats". Prima Donna won a Dora Mavor Moore Award for Outstanding New Musical/Opera in June 2011.

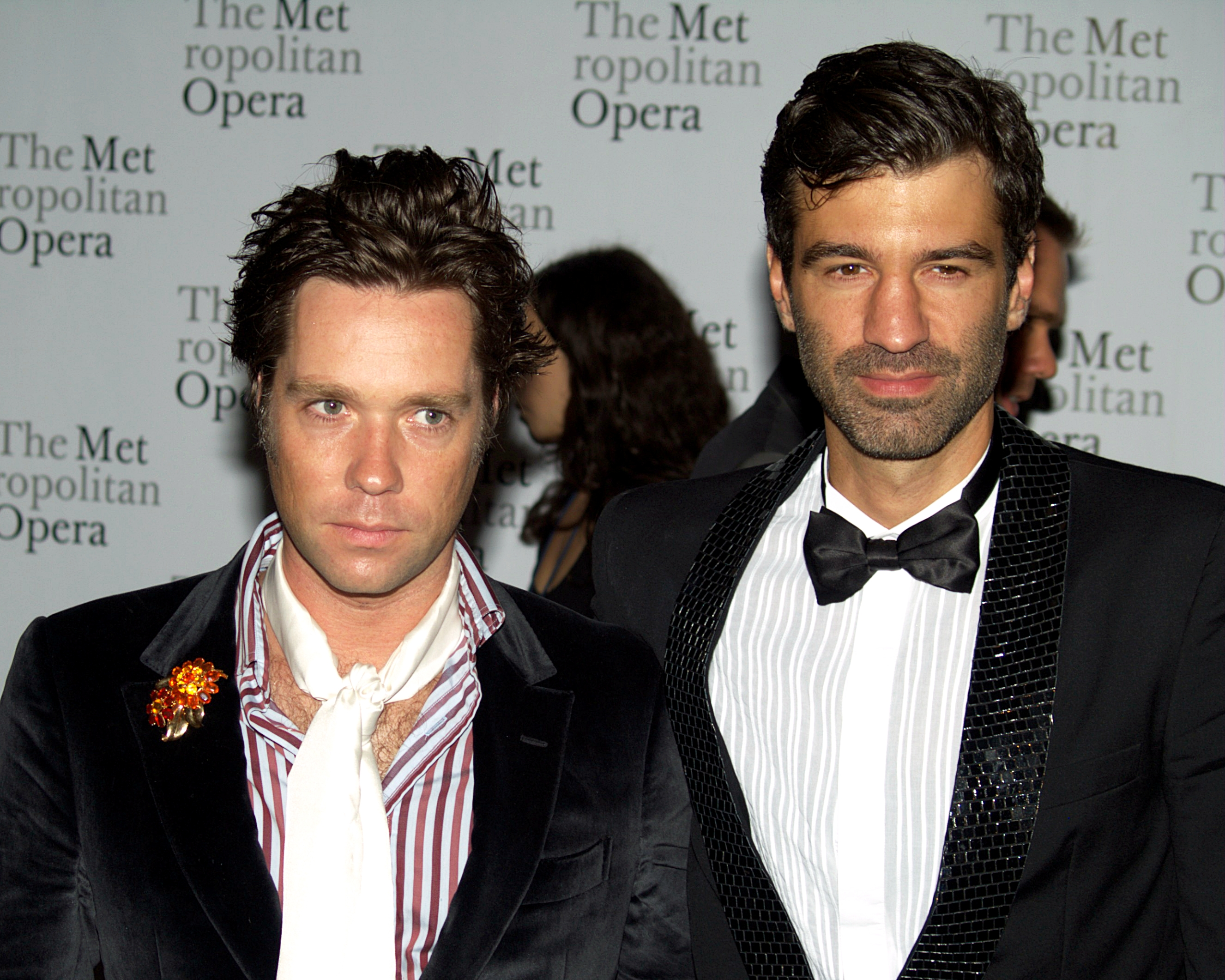
Wainwright and his husband, German arts administrator Jörn Weisbrodt, in 2010

In November 2009, Wainwright announced that he had finished recording his sixth studio album, and was calling it All Days Are Nights: Songs for Lulu. The album was released on March 23 in Canada, April 5 in the UK and April 20 in the US, with the first single "Who Are You New York?".

In December 2009, Wainwright appeared with sister Martha Wainwright and mother Kate McGarrigle at the Royal Albert Hall in London, raising $55,000 for the Kate McGarrigle Fund, which was established in 2008 to raise awareness of sarcoma, a rare cancer that affects connective tissue such as bone, muscle, nerves, and cartilage. It was the last performance made by his mother before her death in January 2010.

In late 2010 Wainwright became engaged to his partner Jörn Weisbrodt. The couple moved to Toronto, Ontario, in early 2012 after Weisbrodt was named artistic director of Toronto's annual Luminato festival.

In 2011, Wainwright announced the birth of his first child, with childhood friend Lorca Cohen, daughter of Leonard Cohen.

In July 2011 a 19-disc box set called House of Rufus containing all his studio and live recordings as well as previously unreleased material was released.

=== 2012-2017: Out of the Game and marriage ===
Wainwright recorded his seventh studio album with producer Mark Ronson. He described the new songs as more "danceable" than his previous material. The album, titled Out of the Game, was released in late April 2012 in the UK and Canada and in early May in the US.

On August 23, 2012, Wainwright and Jörn Weisbrodt married in Montauk, New York. Artist Justin Vivian Bond officiated.

Wainwright's second opera, called Hadrian, premiered at the Canadian Opera Company as their opening production of the 2018 mainstage season at the Four Seasons Centre in Toronto, directed by Canadian Director Peter Hinton-Davis, with libretto written by Canadian playwright Daniel MacIvor. Hadrian attended the workshop Opera Fusion: New Works, a collaboration of Cincinnati Opera and University of Cincinnati College-Conservatory of Music, before its premiere.

In 2015, Wainwright launched a new version of his first opera, accompanied by a film directed by Francesco Vezzoli, featuring Cindy Sherman as the Prima Donna. The finale was shot in Paris during spring 2015 and produced by Petite Maison Production, before it premiered in Athens in September.

=== 2018-2022: Unfollow the Rules ===
Almost a year after releasing the stand-alone single "Sword of Damocles" in October 2018, Rufus signed a record deal with music publisher and record label BMG Rights Management for a new album. Soon after, the new song "Trouble in Paradise" was released as the first single from the album. In February 2020, the album, Unfollow the Rules, was announced alongside the release of the Joni Mitchell-inspired single "Damsel in Distress" and was slated for an April release. A third single, "Peaceful Afternoon", was released on digital platforms in March, with a French version, "Pièce à vivre", as a B-side. In early April, the album release was delayed until July after escalation of the COVID-19 pandemic, Wainwright stating that "The CD's and vinyl LP's of my new album Unfollow The Rules are stuck in the warehouses they had to shut down to make way for all essential businesses being able to operate at full speed", adding "You know that I am an old school guy and for me the physical product is extremely important. I am incredibly proud of this album and the way I want you to experience it ideally is listening to it from front to back in the comfort of your living room, reading the lyrics, and looking at the booklet that I carefully designed." This announcement was accompanied by the announcement of a fourth single, "Alone Time", which was released on April 24, 2020, the date the LP was originally due to be released. One more single, a tongue-in-cheek commentary on fame and status relative to geographic location titled "You Ain't Big", was released in early June. On July 10, Rufus Wainwright's 10th studio album, Unfollow the Rules, was released. The album was met with a warm reception upon release and has amassed mostly positive critic reviews, with an aggregate score of 82 on Metacritic, which is his highest score on the site equal only to his 2001 LP Poses.

On 7 October 2022, Wainwright was featured on "The Loneliest Time", a single by singer Carly Rae Jepsen.

=== 2023-present: Folkocracy, BBC Proms and Dream Requiem ===
On March 7, 2023, Wainwright announced his eleventh studio album, Folkocracy, would be released in June 2023. He said, "This album is almost like a recorded birthday party and birthday present to myself. I just invited all the singers that I greatly admire and always wanted to sing with." On the same day, Wainwright released "Down in the Willow Garden", which features Brandi Carlile. On March 24, 2023, Wainwright released the single "Dear World", a piano ballad about healing the world.

On September 5, 2023, Wainwright appeared at the Royal Albert Hall in the BBC Proms, performing songs from his albums Want One and Want Two specially arranged for the BBC Concert Orchestra, with conductor Sarah Hicks.

Wainwright's opera, Dream Requiem, premiered in 2024. A soundtrack album is due for release in February 2025; actress Meryl Streep is featured.

Wainwright sang the Canadian national anthem before Game 5 of the 2025 World Series. He changed the lyrics from "In all of us command" to "That only us command", which was viewed as protest against US threats of annexation.

On 21 November 2025, Wainwright released the live album I'm A Stranger Here Myself: Wainwright Does Weill, in collaboration with Pacific Jazz Orchestra. The album contains performances of songs written by Kurt Weill.

In January 2026, Wainwright performed after the premiere of Marianne Faithfull tribute documentary at that year's Sundance Film Festival.

== Artistry ==
In addition to his tenor singing voice, Wainwright plays piano and guitar, often switching between the two instruments when performing live. While some songs feature just Wainwright and his piano, his later work is often accompanied by rock instrumentation or a symphony orchestra, displaying complex layering and harmonies with an operatic feel. Wainwright is an opera enthusiast and likes Franz Schubert's lieder. Wainwright's music has been described as "popera" (pop opera) or "baroque pop". Many of his compositions are densely packed amalgams of strings, horns, operatic choruses, and ragtime rhythms, with a warm vocal timbre.

He often performs with his sister, Martha Wainwright, on backup vocals. Despite critical acclaim, Wainwright has experienced limited commercial success in the United States, although the release of Release the Stars saw increased media attention there, as did the associated 2007 U.S. tour.

=== Themes ===
Wainwright's work contains several recurring themes: opera, literature, pop culture, politics, and love (often unrequited love). "Foolish Love" and "Danny Boy" are about a crush he once had on a straight man. Other songs address full-blown love and the consequences of falling out of love ("This Love Affair", "Leaving for Paris", and "Peach Trees"). Wainwright also sings about his family relationships. "Beauty Mark", "Little Sister" and "Martha", and "Dinner at Eight" address, respectively, his experiences with his mother, sisters, and father. Several songs deal with his experiences with addiction ("Go Or Go Ahead", "Early Morning Madness" "Baby" and "I Don't Know What It Is").

The song "Matinee Idol" was written about River Phoenix. "Memphis Skyline" is a tribute to the late singer Jeff Buckley, whom he met briefly in the 1990s when Wainwright was an up-and-coming act. By this time, Buckley had already released his first album Grace, and was well on his way to stardom. The two met several months prior to Buckley's drowning, during a gig by Wainwright. The song references "Hallelujah", a Leonard Cohen song covered by Buckley (and later by Wainwright). "Nobody's Off the Hook" is written to close friend and fellow musician Teddy Thompson.

=== Legacy ===
Wainwright and his music have influenced several artists in the music industry. They include Katy Perry, Olly Alexander of Years & Years, Liv Bruce of Pwr Bttm, and Kimbra.

In Nick Hornby's 2007 book Slam, the child born to the young protagonists gets named "Rufus" (or Roof for short) because his mother listened to Rufus Wainwright while recovering from the ordeal of giving birth.

== Personal life ==
Wainwright, a gay man, married German art administrator Jörn Weisbrodt on August 23, 2012. Wainwright has a daughter, born on February 2, 2011, conceived via sperm donation by Wainwright to photographer and antique dealer Lorca Cohen, daughter of Leonard Cohen. She lives with her mother.

=== Political views ===
Wainwright identifies as "a complete libertarian" and stated in 2008, "I don't think any government should encroach on what goes on in the bedroom at all." In April 2010, Wainwright came out publicly in favour of legalizing same-sex marriage in the United States because he wanted to marry Weisbrodt. Wainwright stated, "I wasn't a huge gay marriage supporter before I met Jörn because I love the whole old-school promiscuous Oscar Wilde freak show of what 'being gay' once was. But since meeting Jörn, that all changed." In 2014, Wainwright reiterated he was a "complete libertarian", and explained that while he did not initially support President Barack Obama, he said he has "become a very big Obama fan", expressing support for his agenda, including women's healthcare and government-provided health coverage.

Wainwright has publicly opposed 45th US President Donald Trump, addressing him in the music video for his song "Sword of Damocles" in 2018 and stating "It's impossible to minimise the ineptitude and pure evil of the Trump administration" in a 2020 interview with NME. In October 2024, he issued a statement in response to the use of his cover of Leonard Cohen's "Hallelujah" at a Trump rally in Pennsylvania on October 14. He described its use at the rally as "the height of blasphemy" but hoped, without much expectation, that listening to the lyrics of the song might engender a sense of remorse in Trump. He also endorsed Kamala Harris' presidential campaign.

== Work in film, television, and theatre ==
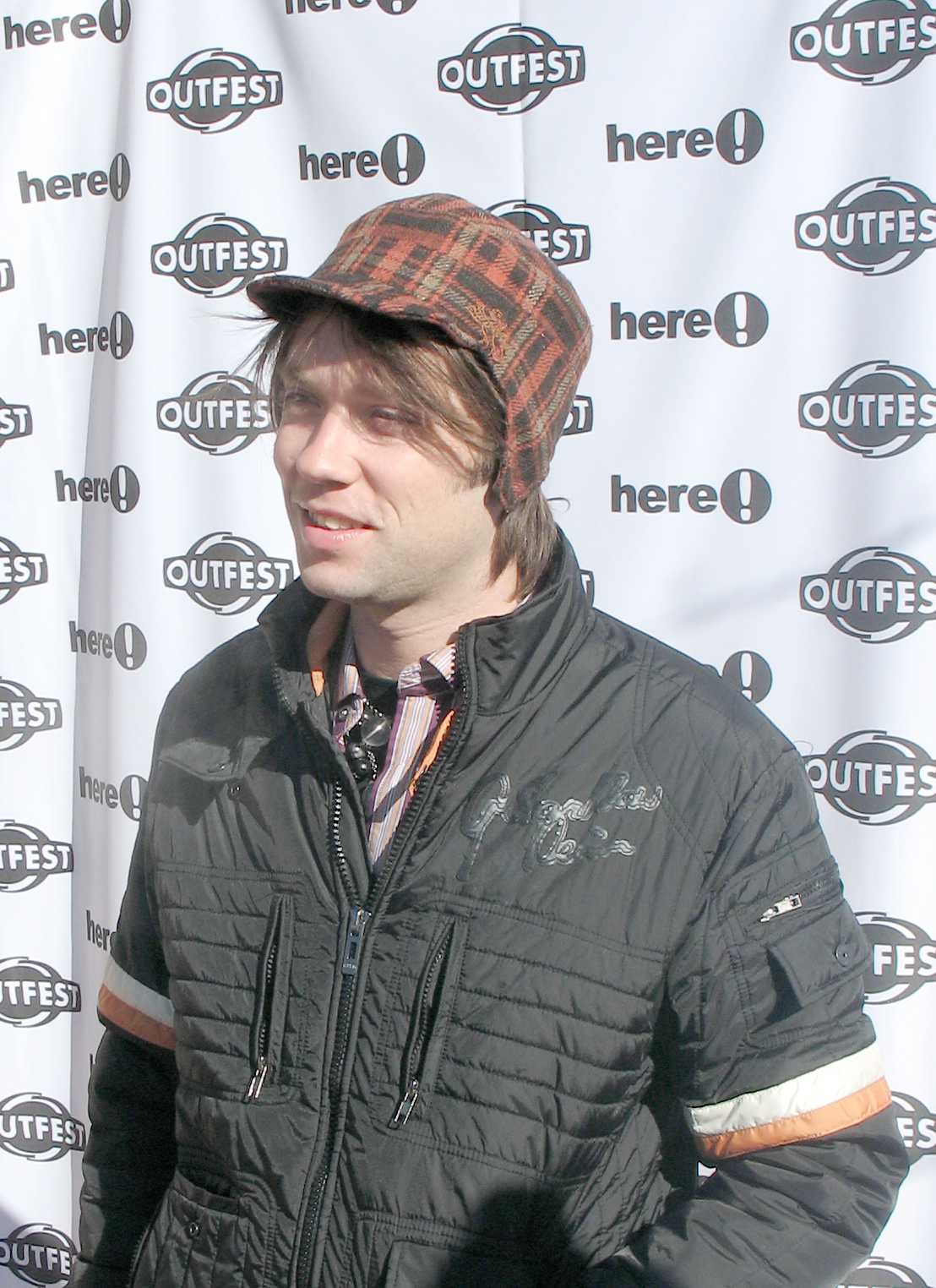
Wainwright at the Sundance Film Festival in 2006

Wainwright has appeared in the films The Aviator (2004), Silver Bullets (2011) and its extended footage follow-up, Stray Bullets, and Heights (2005) in addition to his role in Tommy Tricker and the Stamp Traveller but said in a 2010 interview "I definitely enjoy seeing myself thirty feet high, but it's not something that I'm running toward passionately". He has also recorded tracks specially for films, including Brokeback Mountain, I Am Sam, Moulin Rouge!, Shrek, Meet the Robinsons, Big Daddy, Zoolander, and Leonard Cohen: I'm Your Man. His recording of "Bewitched, Bothered, and Bewildered" plays during the closing credits of the film The History Boys. He is seen in the Denys Arcand film Days of Darkness (L'Âge des ténèbres), performing two arias.

The All I Want DVD, released in 2005, features a full-length documentary (A Portrait of Rufus Wainwright), performances at Central Park Summerstage and Cambridge Corn Exchange, studio sessions, music videos, and two bonus Easter eggs: a 12-minute documentary from 1998, featuring Wainwright and his family, and a short tribute to the McGarrigle sisters featuring Rufus and Martha.

In February 2005, the Pennsylvania Ballet premiered a ballet by Matthew Neenan that was set to Wainwright's music. The Pennsylvania Ballet has performed the work (titled 11:11) several times, including during an eponymous program in June 2006. It has been an audience favorite, although critical reviews have been mixed.

Stephen Petronio commissioned Wainwright to write a score for his dance production BLOOM, which was performed at Joyce Theater in New York in April 2006. For the lyrics, the two selected poems by Walt Whitman and Emily Dickinson, and Petronio arranged for the Young People's Choir of New York to sing them.

In May 2006, Wainwright was one of three guests (along with Robbie Williams and Frances Barber) to star with the Pet Shop Boys in a concert at London's Mermaid Theatre. He covered the Pet Shop Boys' "Casanova in Hell" (from Fundamental). The critically acclaimed show was broadcast on the UK's BBC Radio 2 and repeated on BBC 6 Music, and released as a CD (Concrete) in October 2006.

In June 2007, Wainwright was a part of the multi-artist True Colors Tour, which traveled through 15 cities in the United States and Canada. The tour, sponsored by the Logo channel, began on June 8, 2007. Hosted by comedian Margaret Cho and headlined by Cyndi Lauper, the tour included Debbie Harry, the Gossip, the Indigo Girls, the Dresden Dolls, the MisShapes, and Erasure. Profits went to the Human Rights Campaign. In August 2007, Wainwright said that he considered it a "great honor" to perform on the gay rights tour.

Wainwright continued to tour during 2007 and embraced forms of expression not usually part of mainstream American music concerts. These included dressing in red lipstick and stiletto heeled shoes to perform Judy Garland songs, and expressing his concerns against the current U.S. political situation. His performances were critically acclaimed.

In April 2009, Wainwright worked with the Berliner Ensemble and the avant-garde director Robert Wilson, who hired Wainwright to supply the music for a joint staging of Shakespeares Sonette based on Shakespeare's sonnets.

In June 2012, Wainwright released a comedy video on the Funny or Die website, giving his interpretation of a number of jingles from chewing gum commercials. Also in 2012, Wainwright wrote and sang "Metaphorical Blanket" in the film Any Day Now.

In December 2023, Wainwright performed "Hushabye Mountain" from the 1968 movie Chitty Chitty Bang Bang on the primetime CBS special Dick Van Dyke: 98 Years of Magic.

In March 2024, a new adaptation of John Cassavetes's Opening Night, for which Wainwright wrote the music and lyrics (with book by Ivo van Hove) opened at the Gielgud Theatre in London.

In 2024, Wainwright was featured in Bear McCreary's song "Old Tom Bombadil" from the score to The Lord of the Rings: The Rings of Power. Wainwright also appeared on Bear McCreary's epic rock concept album, graphic novel, and concert experience titled "The Singularity".

== Discography ==
Studio albums

- Rufus Wainwright (1998)
- Poses (2001)
- Want One (2003)
- Want Two (2004)
- Release the Stars (2007)
- All Days Are Nights: Songs for Lulu (2010)
- Out of the Game (2012)
- Prima Donna (2015)
- Take All My Loves: 9 Shakespeare Sonnets (2016)
- Unfollow the Rules (2020)
- Folkocracy (2023)
- Dream Requiem (2025) - Soundtrack album of live performance in Paris

== Tours ==
=== Headlining ===
- 1999: 1999 Tour
- 2001: Poses Tour
- 2003–04: Rufus Wainwright: Live in Concert
- 2007–08: Release the Stars Tour
- 2011: An Evening with Rufus Wainwright
- 2012–13: Out of the Game Tour
- 2014: The Best of Rufus Wainwright
- 2016–17: Rufus in Concert
- 2018–19: All These Poses: Anniversary Tour
- 2019: Oh Solo Wainwright Tour
- 2021–23: Unfollow the Rules Tour

=== Co-headlining ===
- 2004: Triple-Headliner Tour (with Ben Folds and Guster)
- 2005: Odd Man Out Tour (with Ben Folds and Ben Lee)

=== Opening act ===
- 1998: Navy Blues Tour (Sloan)
- 2001: Roxy Music World Tour (Roxy Music)
- 2001: Strange Little Tour (Tori Amos)
- 2004: Sacred Love Tour (Sting)
- 2005: Hopes and Fears Tour (Keane)
- 2007: True Colors (Cyndi Lauper, Debbie Harry and Erasure)

== Awards and nominations ==
Rufus Wainwright won two Juno Awards for Best Alternative Album, one in 1999 for Rufus Wainwright and one in 2002 for Poses. At the age of 15, in 1989, he was nominated for a Genie Award for Best Original Song. A year later he received a nomination for a Juno Award for Most Promising Male Vocalist. He was also nominated for a BRIT Award for Best International Male Artist in 2008 and a Grammy Award for Best Traditional Pop Vocal Album in 2009 and 2020.
