= Sword of Damocles (song) =

Single by Rufus Wainwright
- Released: October 2018
- Length: 5:34
- Songwriter(s): Rufus Wainwright

"Sword of Damocles" is a song by Rufus Wainwright, released in October 2018. Wainwright made the song available for purchase after a premiere performance on The Late Late Show with James Corden on October 18, with a portion of proceeds benefiting voter registration efforts. The song's music video, directed by Andrew Ondrejcak, features Wainwright as Dionysius II of Syracuse and Darren Criss as Damocles.

== Development and composition ==
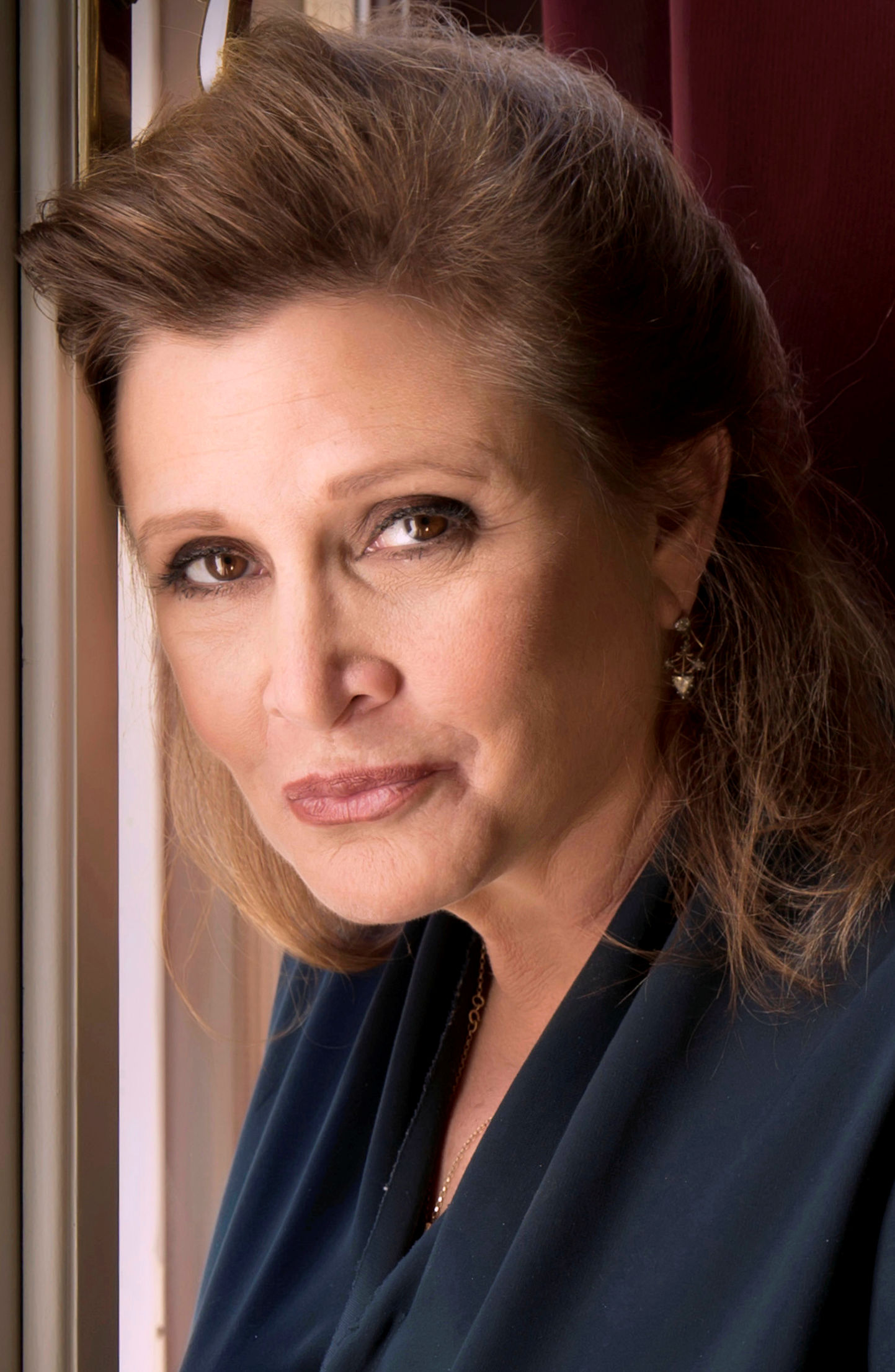
Wainwright wrote the song after hearing Carrie Fisher (pictured in 2013) use the anecdote "the Sword of Damocles" in conversation.

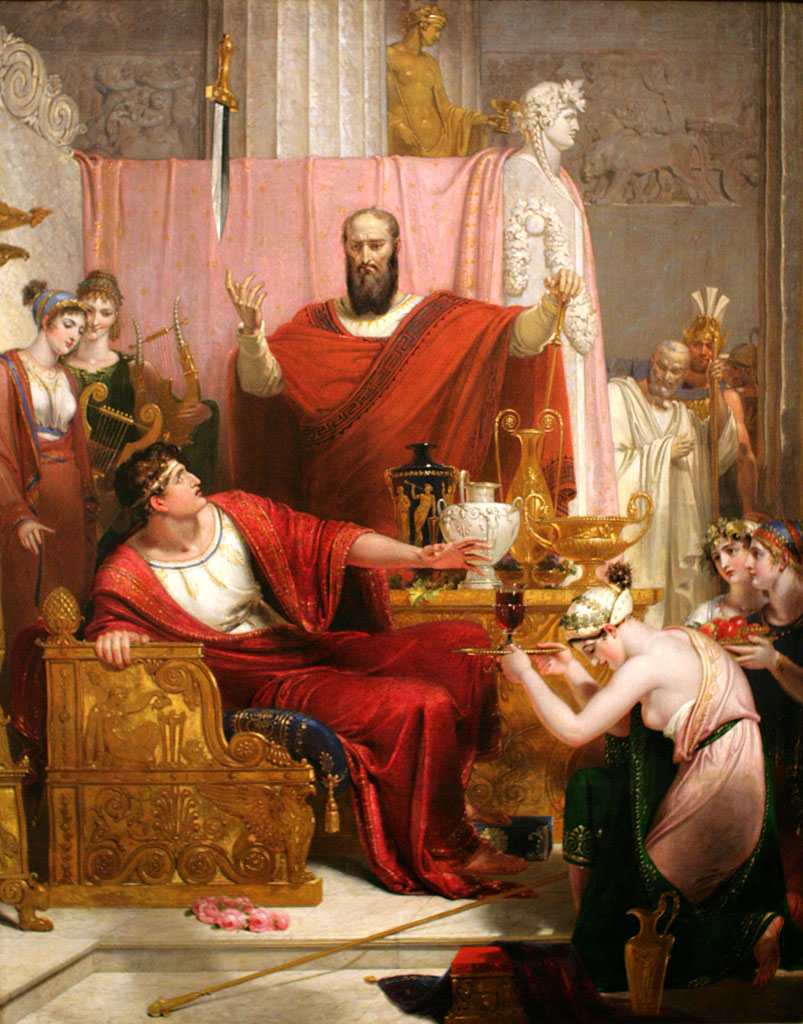
Richard Westall's Sword of Damocles (1812) depicts Dionysius II of Syracuse drawing Damocles's attention to the sword hanging above him; similar imagery is seen in the song's music video.

"Sword of Damocles", written by Wainwright around the United States presidential election in 2016, alludes to the story of Damocles and the perils faced by those in positions of power. Wainwright developed the song after hearing his friend Carrie Fisher use the anecdote "the Sword of Damocles" in conversation to describe her "troubled state of mind". The singer recalled, "I had no idea what [Carrie] was referring to, but it rang into one ear and didn't leave the other one. It was just stuck in my head. And it became this uneasy thread that I started writing about. It wasn't even about politics at the time, more about this gnawing feeling that something was occurring." Following the 2016 election, Wainwright researched the story of Damocles and finished writing the song. He recorded "Sword of Damocles" in 2017, and started performing the song at concerts.

Wainwright released the song in 2018, prior to the mid-term elections, to encourage people to vote. He described the song as his "artistic response to what [he sees] currently transpiring within the American government and how its collapse is affecting every aspect of existence for us all". Furthermore, Wainwright said in a statement:

With the Midterm Elections around the corner, it’s important for everyone to take a stand and contribute in some way – whether it’s bringing awareness to issues in your community, protesting/demonstrating, watching the news to formulate your own opinions, creating, yelling – it’s all hands on deck... The famed, ancient expression 'Sword of Damocles' is a parable of impending doom of and to those in positions of power. This timeless tale points out the hard fact that with great power, comes great responsibility, and for all concerned, great danger. VOTE.

The song's lyrics, which are critical of President Donald Trump, were described as "doomy" by Brooke Bajgrowicz of Billboard. The music magazine's Nicole Engelman called "Sword of Damocles" as a "swelling" piano ballad "[dripping] in political satire." Rolling Stone's Ryan Reed described the song as a ballad in which Wainwright "croons over stately piano chords". Colin Bertram of Bloomberg.com called the song a "political anthem".

== Release and promotion ==
Wainwright debuted the song on The Late Late Show with James Corden on October 18, 2018. He was accompanied by a pianist and illuminated by purple lights. According to Bajgrowicz, Wainwright's performance "instantly captivat[ed] the audience".

The studio version of "Sword of Damocles" was first made available on Bandcamp, with some proceeds benefitting voter registration efforts via the progressive political group Swing Left.

=== Music video ===
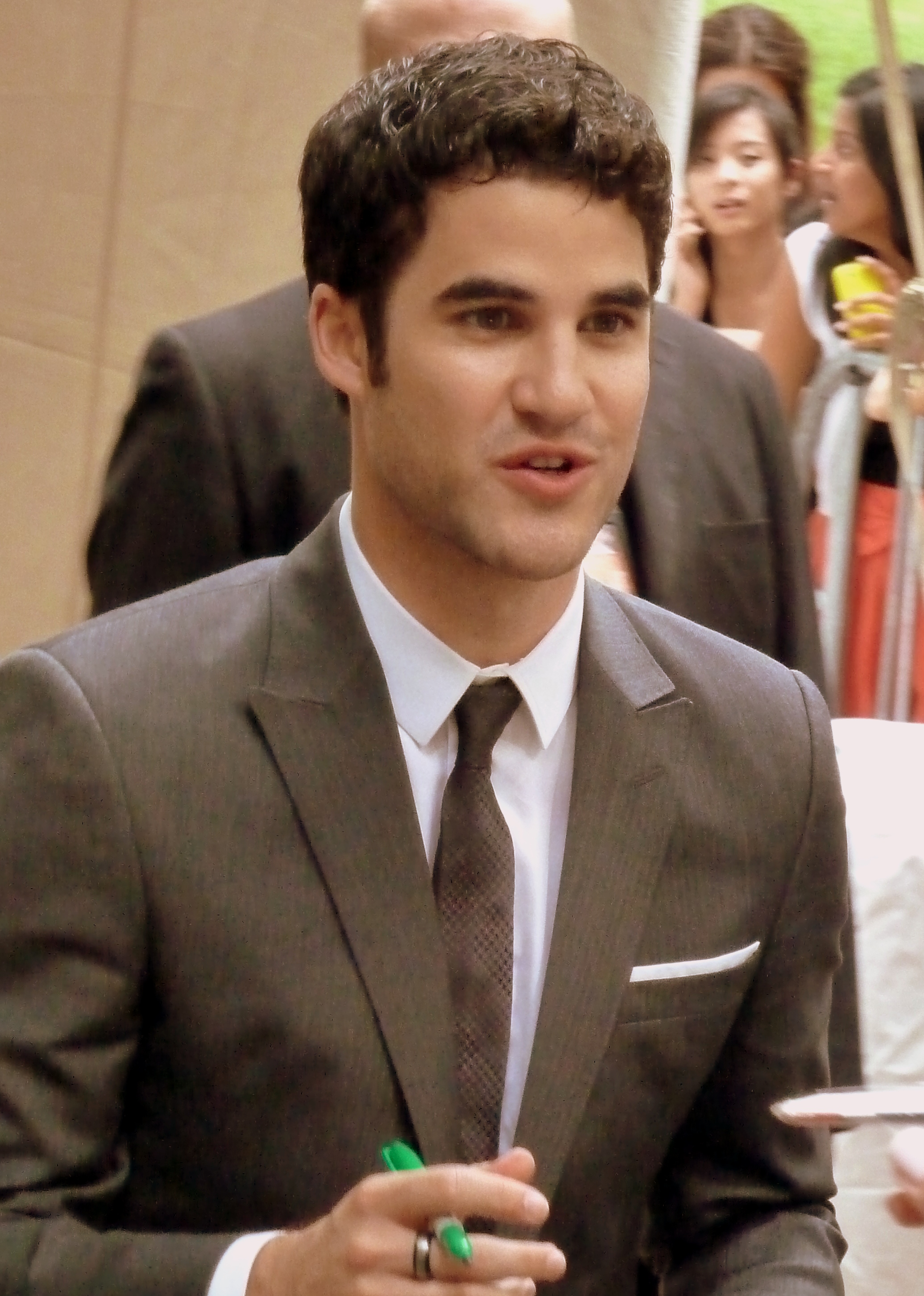
The song's music video features Darren Criss (pictured in 2012) as Damocles.

The song's music video, released on October 30, was directed by Andrew Ondrejcak and features Wainwright as Dionysius II of Syracuse and Darren Criss portraying Damocles. Trump is not referenced directly, but the introduction displays the text: "Dear Mr. President, This ancient story, from the 4th century, reminds me of you. Love, Rufus". Then, text describes the story of Damocles:

At a lavish banquet, King Dionysius is confronted by his servant Damocles – a brat who is jealous of the king's splendor and power. Through supernatural forces, the two roles are switched. The smug, inexperienced commoner becomes the king. But his joy is short-lived. He quickly realizes that being king isn't all crowns and cheeseburgers. With great power comes great responsibility.

The two men sit at opposite ends of a table, and Dionysius is showered with fortunes before he shares them with Damocles. The background visuals become increasingly "absurd" as the fortunes are transferred; among the colorful effects are golden orbs and a maggot-infested hamburger. Damocles is shown with a sword hovering above his head, and the video ends with the text "Vote."

Wainwright and Criss wore costumes designed by Vivienne Westwood. Reed described the music video as "experimental". Wainwright said of its simplicity, "I think if I had gone out being really overwrought politically, it doesn't hit the mark. You're speaking to the converted at this point. America is so divided now that any message shot across the bow has to be put within a larger context... In the end we are all the king, and we all have this sword above our heads that is about to fall."

== Reception ==
American Songwriter's Brianna Goebel called the song "heartfelt" and the music video "compelling". Reed described "Sword of Damocles" as "artful" and "ornate".

== See also ==
- Greek mythology in popular culture
