= Rufus Wainwright discography =

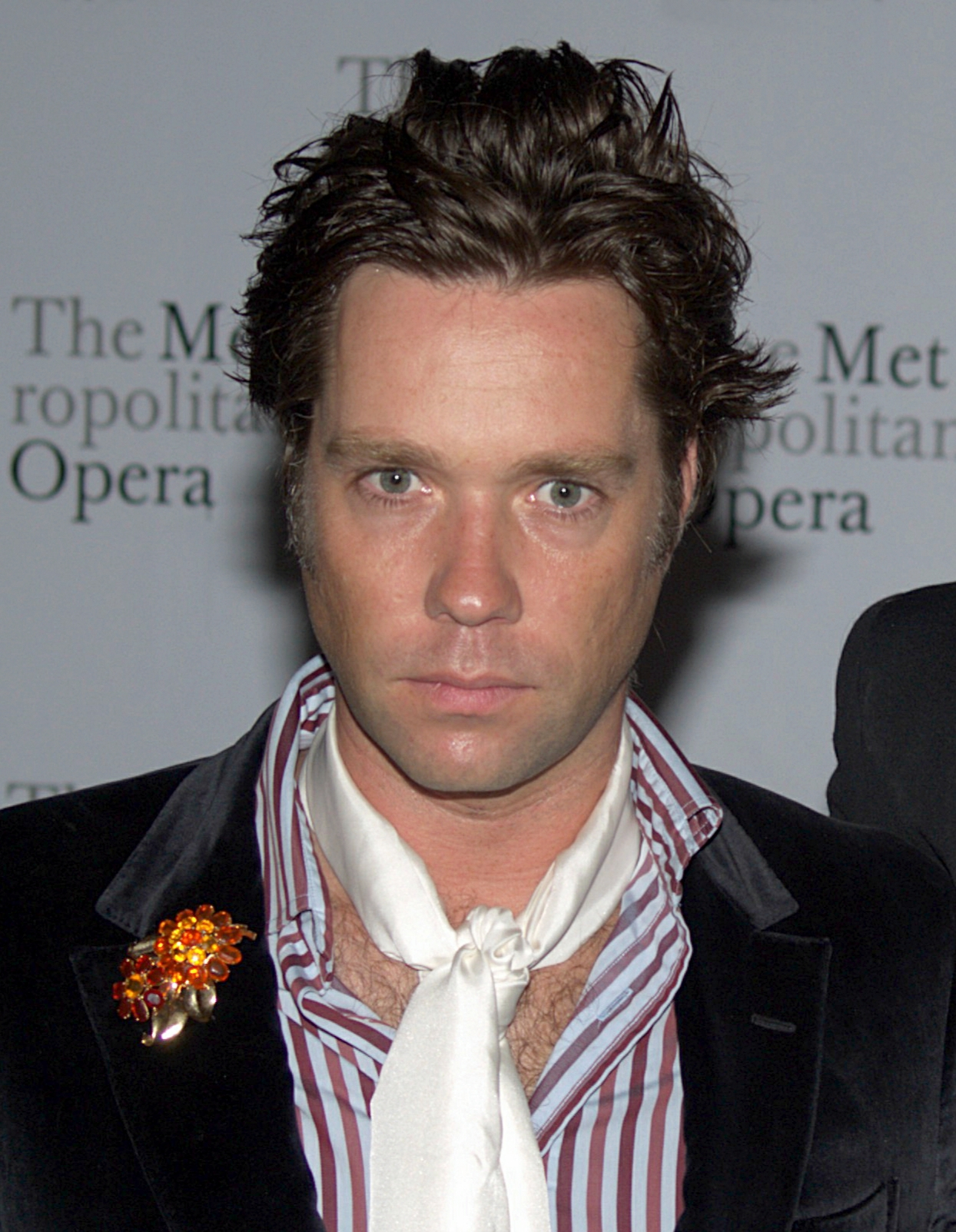
- Rufus Wainwright
- Studio albums: 11
- Extended plays: 3
- Live albums: 7
- Compilation albums: 3
- Singles: 22
- Video albums: 4
- Music videos: 9
- Contributions: 81

The discography of Rufus Wainwright, a Canadian-American singer-songwriter, consists of eleven studio albums, seven live albums, three compilations, three extended plays (EPs), three video albums, twenty-two singles, and nine music videos. Wainwright's self-titled debut album was released through DreamWorks Records in May 1998. Wainwright reached number 24 on Billboard's Top Heatseekers chart, and Rolling Stone named him 1998's Best New Artist. Wainwright's second album, Poses, was released through the same label in June 2001, resulting in a number one on the Heatseekers Chart and number 117 on the Billboard 200. With material recorded from the same session, Want One was released through DreamWorks in September 2003, and Want Two was released through Geffen Records in November 2004.

Wainwright's first EP, Waiting for a Want, was released through DreamWorks in June 2004, previewing songs that later appear on Want Two. His first music DVD, Live at the Fillmore, accompanied Want Two and features live concert footage from a March 2004 performance at The Fillmore in San Francisco, California. Wainwright's second EP, Alright, Already: Live in Montréal, was released by Geffen via iTunes in the United States and Canada on March 15, 2005. All I Want, released through Geffen in April 2005, contains various pieces of work, including a documentary (A Portrait of Rufus Wainwright), live performances, and music videos. Want, a repackaging of Want One and Want Two as one album, was released through DreamWorks/Geffen in November 2005, and contains two extra tracks.

Release the Stars, Wainwright's self-produced fifth studio album, was released through Geffen in May 2007. His most successful album to date, Release the Stars charted in 12 countries and was certified gold in both the United Kingdom and Canada. To promote the album, Tiergarten was distributed digitally and in limited vinyl format as Wainwright's third EP. Rufus Does Judy at Carnegie Hall became Wainwright's sixth album, a live recording released through Geffen in December 2007. The album earned Wainwright his first Grammy Award nomination, the 2009 award for Best Traditional Pop Vocal Album. Coinciding with the album, Rufus! Rufus! Rufus! Does Judy! Judy! Judy!: Live from the London Palladium is a DVD release of Wainwright's tribute concert to Judy Garland recorded in London in February 2007. Wainwright's August 27, 2007, performance at Pabst Theater in Milwaukee, Wisconsin was released in September 2009 as a live CD and video album titled Milwaukee at Last!!!. Wainwright's sixth studio album, All Days Are Nights: Songs for Lulu, was first released in Canada through Decca on March 23, 2010. House of Rufus, a career-spanning box set, was released on July 18, 2011. Wainwright's seventh studio album, Out of the Game was released in May 2012. In 2014, Wainwright released the compilation album Vibrate: The Best of Rufus Wainwright and live album Rufus Wainwright: Live from the Artists Den.

== Albums ==
=== Studio albums ===
| Title | Album details | Peak chart positions | | | | | | | | | | Certifications (sales thresholds) |
| Title | Album details | US | AUT | BEL | CAN | DEN | FRA | GER | NLD | NOR | UK | Certifications (sales thresholds) |
|---|---|---|---|---|---|---|---|---|---|---|---|---|
| Rufus Wainwright | Released: May 19, 1998; Label: DreamWorks; Formats: CD, LP | — | — | — | — | — | — | — | — | — | 171 | BPI: Silver |
| Poses | Released: June 5, 2001; Label: DreamWorks; Format: CD | 117 | — | — | — | — | — | — | — | — | 132 | BPI: Silver; MC: Gold |
| Want One | Released: September 23, 2003; Label: DreamWorks; Formats: CD, LP | 60 | — | — | — | — | 130 | — | 77 | — | 88 | BPI: Gold |
| Want Two | Released: November 16, 2004; Label: Geffen; Formats: CD, LP | 103 | — | 69 | — | — | 160 | — | 68 | — | 21 | BPI: Silver |
| Release the Stars | Released: May 15, 2007; Label: Geffen; Format: CD | 23 | 72 | 22 | 7 | 8 | 53 | 45 | 27 | 4 | 2 | BPI: Gold; MC: Gold |
| All Days Are Nights: Songs for Lulu | Released: March 23, 2010; Label: Decca; Formats: CD, LP | 75 | 75 | 52 | 4 | 31 | 160 | — | 38 | 27 | 21 | |
| Out of the Game | Released: May 1, 2012; Label: Decca, Polydor; Format: CD, LP | 35 | 32 | 26 | 11 | 5 | — | 22 | 12 | 29 | 5 | |
| Prima Donna | Released: October 2, 2015; Label: Deutsche Grammophon; Formats: CD, LP | — | — | — | — | — | — | — | — | — | — | |
| Take All My Loves: 9 Shakespeare Sonnets | Released: April 22, 2016; Label: Deutsche Grammophon; Formats: CD | — | — | 89 | — | — | — | — | 53 | — | — (Note: "Take All My Loves: 9 Shakespeare Sonnets" did not enter the UK Albums Chart, but peaked at number 17 on the UK Compilation Albums Chart.) | |
| Unfollow the Rules | Released: July 10, 2020; Label: BMG; Formats: CD, LP | — | 29 | 45 | — | — | 176 | 28 | 28 | — | 27 | |
| Folkocracy | Released: June 2, 2023; Label: BMG; Formats: CD, LP, DD | — | — | — | — | — | — | — | — | — | — (Note: "Folkocracy" did not enter the UK Albums Chart, but peaked at number 9 on the UK Albums Downloads Chart and at number 8 on the UK Independent Albums Chart.) | |
"—" denotes releases that did not chart.

=== Live albums ===
| Year | Album details | Peak chart positions | | | |
| Year | Album details | US | BEL | NLD | UK |
|---|---|---|---|---|---|
| Rufus Does Judy at Carnegie Hall | Released: December 4, 2007; Label: Geffen; Format: CD | 171 | 84 | 88 | 171 |
| Milwaukee at Last!!! | Released: September 22, 2009; Label: Decca; Format: CD | — | — | — | — |
| Rufus Wainwright: Live from the Artists Den | Released: March 4, 2014; Label: Artists Den/Universal Music; Format: CD | — | — | — | — |
| Unfollow the Rules: The Paramour Session | Released: September 10, 2021; Label: BMG, Modern Recordings; Format: LP, digital | — | — | — | — |
| Rufus Wainwright and Amsterdam Sinfonietta Live | Released: November 26, 2021; Label: BMG, Modern Recordings; Format: CD, LP, digital | — | — | — | — |
| Rufus Does Judy at Capitol Studios | Released: June 10, 2022; Label: BMG; Formats: CD, LP, DD | — | — | — | — |
| I'm a Stranger Here Myself: Wainwright Does Weill (with Pacific Jazz Orchestra) | Released: November 21, 2025; Label: Rock & Roll Credit Card Inc; Format: CD, vinyl, digital download, streaming | — | — | — | — |

=== Compilation albums ===
| Title | Album details | Notes |
|---|---|---|
| Want | Released: November 27, 2005; Label: DreamWorks/Geffen; Format: CD | Want One and Want Two re-packaged as one album in the UK; Two new tracks: "Chelsea Hotel No. 2" and "In with the Ladies" |
| Yellow Lounge compiled by Rufus Wainwright | Released: May 25, 2007; Label: Universal Music Classics & Jazz; Format: CD | Mix Tape of Classical Music compiled by Rufus Wainwright; Tracks 1 and 19 written by Rufus Wainwright |
| House of Rufus | Released: July 18, 2011; Label: Universal Music; Format: CD, DVD | 19-disc box set featuring six studio albums, two live albums, DVDs and unreleased material |
| Vibrate: The Best of Rufus Wainwright | Released: March 3, 2014; Label: Universal Music; Format: CD | One-disc standard edition and deluxe edition with a bonus disc of rarities and live recordings; Two new tracks: "Me & Liza", "Chic and Pointless" (deluxe version); First release of "WWIII" on CD |

== Extended plays ==
| Title | EP details | Notes |
|---|---|---|
| Waiting for a Want | Released: June 29, 2004; Label: DreamWorks; Format: Digital download | Contains four songs that later appeared on Want Two |
| Alright, Already: Live in Montréal | Released: March 15, 2005; Label: Geffen; Format: Digital download | Available only on iTunes in the US, Canada, and Germany; Contains six live tracks, recorded in Montreal |
| Tiergarten | Released: October 29, 2007 (UK); Label: Geffen; Formats: Digital download, vinyl | Contains one track: "Supermayer Lost in Tiergarten" remix; Available digitally and in limited vinyl release (500 copies) |
| Technopera | Released: 2021 (UK); Label: BMG Management; Formats: Digital download | Contains four tracks; with Ampersounds |

== Singles ==
| Title | Year | Peak chart positions | | | | | Album |
| Title | Year | US Rock | BEL (FL) | JPN | NLD | UK | Album |
|---|---|---|---|---|---|---|---|
| "I Don't Know What It Is" | 2004 | — | — | — | — | 74 | Want One |
| "Oh What a World" | 2004 | — | — | — | — | — | Want One |
| "The One You Love" | 2005 | — | — | — | — | — | Want Two |
| "Crumb by Crumb" | 2005 | — | — | — | — | — | Want Two |
| "Hallelujah" | 2007 | 16 | — | — | — | 97 | Shrek soundtrack |
| "Going to a Town" | 2007 | — | — | — | — | 54 | Release the Stars |
| "Rules and Regulations" | 2007 | — | — | — | — | — | Release the Stars |
| "Tiergarten"^{[a]} | 2007 | — | — | — | — | — | Release the Stars |
| "Hallelujah" (re-release) | 2009 | — | — | — | — | — | Non-album single |
| "Out of the Game" | 2012 | — | 31 | 55 | 99 | 182 | Out of the Game |
| "Jericho" | 2012 | — | 38 | — | — | — | Out of the Game |
| "Me and Liza" | 2014 | — | 59 | — | — | — | Vibrate: The Best of Rufus Wainwright |
| "A Woman's Face Reprise (Sonnet 20)" | 2016 | — | — | — | — | — | Take All My Loves: 9 Shakespeare Sonnets |
| "Sword of Damocles" | 2018 | — | — | — | — | — | Non-album single |
| "Trouble in Paradise" | 2019 | — | 40 | — | — | — | Unfollow the Rules |
| "Damsel in Distress" | 2020 | — | — | — | — | — | Unfollow the Rules |
| "Dear World" | 2023 | — | — | — | — | — | Non-album single |
| "Down in the Willow Garden" (featuring Brandi Carlile) | 2023 | — | — | — | — | — | Folkocracy |
| "Heading Home" (featuring John Legend) | 2023 | — | — | — | — | — | Folkocracy |
| "Dream Requiem: Sequentia V. Confutatis" (with Orchestre Philharmonique de Radio France, Chœur de Radio France & Meryl Streep) | 2024 | — | — | — | — | — | Dream Requiem |
| "Dream Requiem: Offertorium" (with Orchestre Philharmonique de Radio France) | 2024 | — | — | — | — | — | Dream Requiem |
| "Mack the Knife" (with Pacific Jazz Orchestra) | 2025 | — | — | — | — | — | I'm a Stranger Here Myself: Wainwright Does Weill |
"—" denotes releases that did not chart.

a Released in a 12-inch single format, limited to 500 copies; features the "Supermayer Lost in Tiergarten" remix

=== As featured performer ===
| Title | Year | Album |
|---|---|---|
| "To America" (Joan as Police Woman duet) | 2008 | To Survive |
| "Wolves" (Martha Wainwright featuring Rufus Wainwright) | 2020 | Non-album single |
| "Just a Bend" (Crane Like The Bird featuring Rufus Wainwright) | 2021 | TBA |
| "A Wanderer in the Sleeping City" (Wu Qing-feng featuring Rufus Wainwright) | 2022 | L'Après-midi d'un faune |
| "The Loneliest Time" (Carly Rae Jepsen featuring Rufus Wainwright) | 2022 | The Loneliest Time |

== Video albums ==
| Title | Video details | Notes | US Video | Certifications |
|---|---|---|---|---|
| Live at the Fillmore | Released: November 16, 2004; Label: Geffen; Format: DVD | Accompanied the release of Want Two; 20 songs performed live; recorded at The Fillmore in March 2004 | 8 | |
| All I Want | Released: April 8, 2005; Label: Geffen; Format: DVD | Features documentary, live concert footage, and music videos | — | CAN: Gold |
| Rufus! Does Judy!... | Released: December 4, 2007; Label: Geffen; Format: DVD | Wainwright's tribute concert to Judy Garland; Recorded in London in February 2007 | — | |
| Milwaukee at Last!!! | Released: September 22, 2009; Label: Decca; Format: DVD | 23 songs performed live; filmed August 27, 2007, by Albert Maysles at Pabst Theater in Milwaukee, Wisconsin | — | |
"—" denotes releases that did not chart.

== Music videos ==
| Year | Title | Album | Director |
|---|---|---|---|
| 1998 | "April Fools" | Rufus Wainwright | Sophie Muller |
| 2001 | "Cigarettes and Chocolate Milk" | Poses | Giles Dunning |
| 2001 | "California" | Poses | Giles Dunning |
| 2002 | "Across the Universe" | I Am Sam | Len Wisemen |
| 2005 | "The One You Love" | Want Two | George Scott |
| 2006 | "The Maker Makes" | Brokeback Mountain | Doug Biro |
| 2007 | "Going to a Town" | Release the Stars | Sophie Muller |
| 2007 | "Rules and Regulations" | Release the Stars | Petro Papahadjopoulos |
| 2008 | "Zing! Went the Strings of My Heart" | Rufus! Does Judy!... | Russell Thomas |
| 2012 | "Out of the Game" | Out of the Game | Philip Andelman |
| 2014 | "Bitter Tears" | Out of the Game | Charly Braun |
| 2017 | "Signed, Sealed, Delivered (I'm Yours)" | Stand-alone single | Andrew Ondrejcak |
| 2018 | "Sword of Damocles" | Stand-alone single | Andrew Ondrejcak |
| 2019 | "Trouble in Paradise" | Unfollow the Rules | Mia Donovan |
| 2019 | "Damsel in Distress" | Unfollow the Rules | Josh Shaffner |
| 2020 | "Alone Time" | Unfollow the Rules | Josh Shaffner |
| 2020 | "Devils & Angels (Hatred)" | Unfollow the Rules | Jorn Weisbrodt |
| 2020 | "Haine" | Unfollow the Rules | Jorn Weisbrodt |
| 2022 | "The Man That Got Away" | Rufus Does Judy at Capitol Studios | unknown |
| 2023 | "Down In The Willow Garden" | Folkocracy | unknown |
| 2023 | "Heading For Home" | Folkocracy | unknown |
| 2023 | "Twelve-Thirty" | Folkocracy | unknown |

Note: Promotional music videos consisting of live concert footage exist for "Beautiful Child", "Hallelujah", "Vibrate", and "Want".

== Other contributions ==
=== Soundtracks ===
| Year | Album | Song(s) | Label | Ref. |
|---|---|---|---|---|
| 1988 | Tommy Tricker and the Stamp Traveller (Les Aventuriers du Timbre Perdu) | "I'm a-Runnin'" | Les éditions La Fête | |
| 1997 | The Myth of Fingerprints | "Le Roi D'Ys" "Banks of the Wabash" | Velvel Records | |
| 1999 | Big Daddy | "Instant Pleasure" | Sony | |
| 2001 | Moulin Rouge! | "Complainte de la Butte" | Interscope | |
| 2001 | Shrek Original Soundtrack | "Hallelujah" | DreamWorks | |
| 2001 | Zoolander | "He Ain't Heavy, He's My Brother" | Hollywood Records | |
| 2002 | I Am Sam | "Across the Universe" | V2/BMG | |
| 2003 | Stormy Weather: The Music of Harold Arlen | "It's Only a Paper Moon" "I Wonder What Became of Me" | Sony | |
| 2004 | Bridget Jones: The Edge of Reason | "I Eat Dinner (When the Hunger's Gone)" (with Dido) | Geffen Records | |
| 2004 | The Aviator | "I'll Build a Stairway to Paradise" | Sony | |
| 2005 | Prime | "Peach Trees" | Varèse Sarabande | |
| 2005 | Brokeback Mountain | "King of the Road" (duet with Teddy Thompson) "The Maker Makes" | Verve Forecast | |
| 2006 | Leonard Cohen: I'm Your Man | "Chelsea Hotel No. 2" "Everybody Knows" | Verve Forecast | |
| 2006 | The History Boys: The Original Soundtrack | "Bewitched" | Rhino/Wea | |
| 2007 | Meet the Robinsons | "Another Believer" "The Motion Waltz (Emotional Commotion)" | Walt Disney Records | |
| 2012 | Any Day Now | "Metaphorical Blanket" | Lakeshore Records | |
| 2013 | Boardwalk Empire Volume 2: Music from the HBO Original Series | "Jimbo Jambo" | ABKCO | |

=== Compilations ===
| Year | Album | Song(s) | Label | Ref. |
|---|---|---|---|---|
| 2002 | When Love Speaks | "Sonnet 29 – When in Disgrace..." | EMI Classics | |
| 2003 | Wig in a Box | "The Origin of Love" | Off Records | |
| 2003 | Maybe This Christmas Too? | "Spotlight on Christmas" | Nettwerk Records | |
| 2005 | Elton John's Christmas Party | "Spotlight on Christmas" | Hear Music | |
| 2005 | Sweetheart 2005: Love Songs | "My Funny Valentine" | Hear Music | |
| 2006 | Plague Songs | "Katonah" | 4AD | |
| 2006 | Rogue's Gallery... | "Lowlands Away" (with Kate McGarrigle) | ANTI- | |
| 2007 | Sounds Eclectic: The Covers Project | "Harvest" (with Chris Stills) | Hear Music | |
| 2007 | Stockings by the Fire | "What are You Doing New Year's Eve?" | Hear Music | |
| 2008 | Groupes de Pamplemousse | "Il pleure dans mon cœur" (composed music) | Jajou Productions | |
| 2008 | Born to the Breed: A Tribute to Judy Collins | "Albatross" | Wildflower | |
| 2009 | War Child Presents Heroes | "Wonderful/Song for Children" | Parlophone | |
| 2012 | Every Mother Counts 2012 | "Instead of the Dead" | Hear Music | |
| 2013 | Sing Me the Songs: Celebrating the Works of Kate McGarrigle | "Kiss and Say Goodbye" "Southern Boys" "Entre Lajeunesse et la sagesse" "I Eat Dinner" "First Born" "Walking Song" "I Am a Diamond" "I Cried for Us" "Oliver" "Dink's Song" "Love Over and Over" | Nonesuch | |

=== Guest appearances ===
| Year | Artist | Album | Song(s) | Description | Ref. |
|---|---|---|---|---|---|
| 1983 | Kate & Anna McGarrigle | Love Over and Over | "A Place in Your Heart" | Guest vocalist | |
| 1990 | Kate & Anna McGarrigle | Heartbeats Accelerating | "I'm Losing You" | Guest vocalist | |
| 1991 | Various Artists | Songs of the Civil War | "Better Times are Coming" "Hard Times Come Again No More" | Co-lead vocalist (with Kate & Anna McGarrigle); Backing vocalist | |
| 1998 | Cecil Seaskull | Whoever | "La Song" | Guest vocalist | |
| 1998 | Kate & Anna McGarrigle | The McGarrigle Hour | "Schooldays" "What'll I Do?" "Heartburn" "Talk to Me of Mendocino" "Goodnight Sweetheart" | Co-lead vocalist, Background vocals on various other tracks | |
| 1999 | Shoofly | Dirty White Town | "You Don't Know" | Guest vocalist | |
| 1999 | Various Artists | Gzowski in Compilation | "Talk to Me of Mendocino" | Guest vocalist | |
| 2000 | Teddy Thompson | Teddy Thompson | "So Easy" "Missing Children" | Guest vocalist Co-wrote | |
| 2000 | Kiki and Herb | Do You Hear What We Hear? | "Those Were the Days" | Co-lead vocalist | |
| 2001 | Jordi Rosen | Madame Xavier | "Three Angels" "Mistletoe" | Backing vocalist | |
| 2001 | Elton John | Songs from the West Coast | "American Triangle" | Backing vocalist | |
| 2002 | Julianna Raye | Restless Night | "More Wine" | Co-written, vocal duet | |
| 2002 | Kristian Hoffman | & | "Scarecrow" | Duet | |
| 2002 | Linda Thompson | Fashionably Late | "All I See" | Guest vocalist | |
| 2004 | David Byrne | Grown Backwards | "Au Fond du Temple Saint" | Duet | |
| 2005 | Antony and the Johnsons | I Am a Bird Now | "What Can I Do?" | Lead vocals | |
| 2005 | Kiki and Herb | Kiki and Herb Will Die for You | "Those Were the Days" | Co-vocalist | |
| 2005 | Martha Wainwright | Martha Wainwright | "Don't Forget" "The Maker" | Arranged vocals Backing vocalist | |
| 2005 | Jason Hart | If I Were You | "Mona Lisas and Mad Hatters" | Co-lead vocalist | |
| 2005 | Burt Bacharach | At This Time | "Go Ask Shakespeare" | Solo vocalist | |
| 2006 | Jane Birkin | Fictions | "Waterloo Station" | Wrote lyrics | |
| 2006 | Sloan Wainwright | Life Grows Back | "Tired of Wasting Time" | Duet | |
| 2006 | Pet Shop Boys | Concrete | "Casanova in Hell" | Solo vocalist | |
| 2007 | Teddy Thompson | Upfront & Down Low | "My Blue Tears" | Arranged strings | |
| 2007 | Linda Thompson | Versatile Heart | "Beauty" | Wrote song | |
| 2007 | Ann Wilson | Hope & Glory | "A Hard Rain's a-Gonna Fall" | Co-vocalist | |
| 2008 | Martha Wainwright | I Know You're Married; But I've Got Feelings Too | "The George Song" | Guest vocalist | |
| 2008 | Joan as Police Woman | To Survive | "To America" | Guest vocalist | |
| 2008 | Mareva Galanter | Happy Fiu | "Serge et Jane" | Guest vocalist | |
| 2008 | Marianne Faithfull | Easy Come, Easy Go | "Children of Stone" | Guest vocalist | |
| 2009 | Loudon Wainwright III | High Wide & Handsome: The Charlie Poole Project | "Old and Only in the Way" | Backing vocalist | |
| 2009 | Rosanne Cash | The List | "Silver Wings" | Guest vocalist | |
| 2009 | Shirley Bassey | The Performance | "Apartment" | Wrote song | |
| 2010 | Marlango | Life in the Treehouse | "The Answer" | Backing vocals, piano | |
| 2010 | Josh Groban | Illuminations | "Au Jardin des Sans-Pourquoi" | Co-wrote lyrics | |
| 2011 | Lulu Gainsbourg | From Gainsbourg to Lulu | "Je Suis Venu Te Dire Que Je M'en Vais" | Solo vocalist | |
| 2011 | Carole Pope | Landfall | "Landfall" | Guest, vocal duet with C. Pope | |
| 2011 | Ben Folds | The Best Imitation of Myself: A Retrospective | "Careless Whisper" | Guest vocalist | |
| 2012 | Loudon Wainwright III | Older Than My Old Man Now | "The Days That We Die" | Guest vocalist | |
| 2013 | Pink Martini | Get Happy | "Kitty Come Home" | Guest vocalist | |
| 2013 | Pink Martini | Get Happy | "Get Happy/Happy Days" | Guest vocalist | |
| 2013 | Robbie Williams | Swings Both Ways | "Swings Both Ways" | Guest vocalist | |
| 2016 | Robbie Williams | The Heavy Entertainment Show | "Hotel Crazy" | Guest vocalist | |
| 2019 | Heart | Live in Atlantic City | "Barracuda" | Guest, vocal duet with Jerry Cantrell, Dave Navarro, Duff McKagan, Gretchen Wilson and Carrie Underwood | |
| 2019 | Heart | Live in Atlantic City | "Dog & Butterfly" | Quest vocalist | |
| 2020 | Francesco Bianconi | Forever | "Andante" | Guest vocalist | |
| 2023 | Glüme | Main Character | "Main Character" | Guest vocalist | |
| 2024 | Linda Thompson | Proxy Music | "Darling This Will Never Do" | Lead vocals | |
| 2025 | Jordan Firstman | Secrets | "Passed out drunk making mac and cheese woke up to a fireman in my apartment" | Guest vocals | |

== See also ==
- Martha Wainwright discography
