= Want (Rufus Wainwright album) =

Studio album by Rufus Wainwright
- Released: November 28, 2005 (UK)
- Genre: Pop
- Length: 62:31 + 54:08
- Label: DreamWorks/Geffen
- Producer: Marius de Vries

Want is a repackaged double album by Canadian-American singer-songwriter Rufus Wainwright, released in the United Kingdom on November 28, 2005. It contains all the tracks from both Want One and Want Two, along with two bonus tracks: a cover of Leonard Cohen's "Chelsea Hotel No. 2" along with "In with the Ladies".

== Track listing ==
All songs written by Wainwright, unless otherwise noted.

Disc 1

1. "Oh What a World" – 4:23
2. "I Don't Know What It Is" – 4:51
3. "Vicious World" – 2:50
4. "Movies of Myself" – 4:30
5. "Pretty Things" – 2:40
6. "Go or Go Ahead" – 6:38
7. "Vibrate" – 2:44
8. "14th Street" – 4:44
9. "Natasha" – 3:28
10. "Harvester of Hearts" – 3:35
11. "Beautiful Child" – 4:15
12. "Want" – 5:10
13. "11:11" – 4:27
14. "Dinner at Eight" – 4:33

Disc 2

1. "Agnus Dei" – 5:45
2. "The One You Love" – 3:44
3. "Peach Trees" – 5:59
4. "Little Sister" – 3:22
5. "The Art Teacher" – 3:51
6. "Hometown Waltz" – 2:33
7. "This Love Affair" – 3:13
8. "Gay Messiah" – 3:14
9. "Memphis Skyline" – 4:51
10. "Waiting for a Dream" – 4:14
11. "Crumb by Crumb" – 4:13
12. "Old Whore's Diet" – 9:09
13. "Chelsea Hotel No. 2" (Leonard Cohen) – 3:55
14. "In with the Ladies" (Alex Gifford, Wainwright) – 3:52

== Personnel ==
Want One

- Rufus Wainwright – voice (1–14), piano (2,5,8,10,14), fender rhodes piano (3), recorders (3), acoustic guitar (4,6,11–13), keyboards (9), orchestral arrangements (1,2,7,9,14), choral arrangements (7)
- Marius de Vries – piano (1,7,8,12,13), programming (1–4,6–14), vibraphone (10,12), orchestral arrangements (1,2,7,14), choral arrangements (7)
- Joy Smith – harp (1,2,13,14)
- Nick Hitchens – tuba (1)
- Isobel Griffiths – orchestra contractor (1,2,7,14)
- Gavyn Wright – orchestra leader (1,2,7,14)
- Alexis Smith – programming (1–4,6–14)
- Simon C Clarke – alto sax (1,8,11), baritone sax (1,8,10,11), flute (1,2,14), alto flute (1), piccolo (1)
- Tim Sanders – tenor sax (1,8,10,11)
- Roddy Lorimer – trumpet (1,2,8,10,11), flugelhorn (10)
- Paul Spong – trumpet (1,2,8,11)
- Annie Whitehead – trombone (1,2,8,10,11)
- Dave Stewart – bass trombone (1,2,11)
- Sterling Campbell – drums (2–4,13)
- Jeff Hill – bass (2,4,6,8,11–13)
- Gerry Leonard – guitar (2,8), electric guitar (4,6,11–13), mandolin (13)
- Charlie Sexton – guitar (2,8), electric guitar (4,6,11,12)
- Jimmy Zhivago – guitar (2), electric guitar (4), piano (8)
- Alexandra Knoll – oboe (2)
- David Sapadin – clarinet (2)
- Daniel Shelly – bassoon (2)
- Bernard O'Neill – bass (3,9,10)
- Matt Johnson – drums (6,9,11,12)
- The London Oratory Choir – choir (7)
- Levon Helm – drums (8)
- Kate McGarrigle – banjo (8), accordion (14)
- Martha Wainwright – additional vocals (8,12)
- Jenni Muldaur – additional vocals (8,12)
- Adrian Hallowell – bass trombone (8,11)
- Maxim Moston – concertmaster (9), orchestral arrangements (1,2,7,9,14)
- Teddy Thompson – additional vocals (10)
- Linda Thompson – additional vocals (10)
- Chris Elliott – orchestral arrangements (1,2,7,9,14)

Want Two

- Rufus Wainwright – voice (1–12), piano (1–7,9,10), additional vocals (2,3,8,11), acoustic guitar (2,3,8,11), keyboards (11), orchestral arrangements (1,4,7,9–11)
- Sophie Solomon – violin (1)
- Pit Hermans – cimbalom (1)
- Marius de Vries – keyboards (1,10,11), vibraphone (3,9), programming (2–4,8,9–11), orchestral arrangements (1,4,7,9–11)
- Stefano de Silva – engineer
- Isobel Griffiths – orchestra contractor (1,4,9,11), horn contractor (5,10)
- Gavyn Wright – orchestral leader (1,4,9,11)
- Martha Wainwright – additional vocals (2,3,6,8,12), violin (6)
- Gerry Leonard – electric guitar (2,3), guitars (9)
- Charlie Sexton – electric guitar (2,3)
- Jeff Hill – bass (2,3,8–12), additional vocals (12)
- Levon Helm – drums (2)
- Roberto Rodriguez – percussion (3)
- Sterling Campbell – drums (3,9)
- Matt Johnson – drums (3,8)
- Kate McGarrigle – additional vocals (6), banjo (6)
- Anna McGarrigle – additional vocals (6), accordion (6)
- Lily Lanken – additional vocals (6), recorder (6)
- Brad Albetta – bass (6)
- Maxim Moston – violin (7,10,12), concertmaster (7,10), orchestral arrangements (1,4,7,9–11)
- Antoine Silverman – violin (7,10)
- Joan Wasser – violin (7,10), viola (12)
- Julianne Klopotic – violin (7,10)
- Vivienne Kim – violin (7,10)
- Fiona Murray – violin (7,10)
- Cenovia Cummins – violin (7,10)
- Christopher Cardona – violin (7,10)
- Danielle Farina – viola (7,10)
- Alison Gordon – viola (7,10)
- Eric Hammelman – viola (7,10)
- Kathryn Lockwood – viola (7,10)
- Anja Wood – cello (7,10)
- Jane Scarpantoni – cello (7,10)
- Julia Kent – cello (7,10,12)
- Carlo Pellettieri – cello (7,10)
- Troy Rinker Jr – bass (7,10)
- Alexandra Knoll – oboe (7)
- David Sapadin – clarinet (7)
- Daniel Shelly – bassoon (7)
- Teddy Thompson – additional vocals (8,12)
- Jenni Muldaur – additional vocals (8)
- Suzzy Roche – additional vocals (8)
- Leona Naess – additional vocals (11)
- David Theodore – oboe (11)
- Rob Burger – Hammond organ (11)
- Gina Gershon – jaw harp (11)
- Antony – voice (12)
- Julianna Raye – additional vocals (12)
- Roger Greenawalt – ukulele (12), banjo (12)
- Steven Wolf – djembe (12), tambourine (12), additional programming (12)
- Alexis Smith – programming (2–4,8–11)
- Van Dyke Parks – orchestral arrangements (1,4,7,9–11)
