= Rufus Wainwright and Amsterdam Sinfonietta Live =

Live album by Rufus Wainwright and Amsterdam Sinfonietta
- Released: November 26, 2021
- Recorded: 2017
- Length: 57:52
- Label: BMG; Modern

Rufus Wainwright and Amsterdam Sinfonietta chronology
Unfollow the Rules (2020)	Rufus Wainwright and Amsterdam Sinfonietta Live (2021)

Rufus Wainwright and Amsterdam Sinfonietta Live is a live album by Rufus Wainwright and the Amsterdam Sinfonietta, released via BMG/Modern Recordings on November 26, 2021.

== Release and promotion ==
The album was originally scheduled for release on April 24, 2021, but delayed by disruptions to physical product distribution attributed to the COVID-19 pandemic.

A promotional single, "Gay Messiah", was released ahead of the album. The studio version of "Gay Messiah" was included on Wainwright's 2004 album Want Two, after premiering on the 2004 EP Waiting for a Want.

== Track listing ==
Rufus Wainwright and Amsterdam Sinfonietta Live track listing
No.	Title	Length
1.	"How Deep Is the Ocean"	4:00
2.	"Foolish Love"	5:50
3.	"Excursion à Venise"	3:44
4.	"Tristes apprêts"	3:31
5.	"Go Leave"	4:05
6.	"Gay Messiah"	3:46
7.	"Who by Fire (song)"	5:20
8.	"All I Want"	3:48
9.	"Argentina"	2:45
10.	"I'm Going In"	8:26
11.	"L'île inconnue"	3:50
12.	"Arachne"	4:17
13.	"Amsterdam"	4:30
Total length:		57:52
