= Tiergarten =

Tiergarten (German for "zoo") may refer to:

== Places ==
- Tiergarten (park), an urban public park in Berlin
  - Berlin-Tiergarten station, a railway station adjacent to the park
  - Kleiner Tiergarten, a smaller public park in Berlin
  - Tiergarten (district), a locality within the borough of Mitte which includes the park
  - Tiergartenstraße, a street in the Tiergarten locality

== Music ==
- "Tiergarten" (song), a song from Rufus Wainwright's album Release the Stars
  - Tiergarten (EP), a digital EP with a remix of the song
- "Tiergarten", an instrumental track, by Tangerine Dream, from their 1985 album, Le Parc
