= World Soundtrack Awards 2001 =

Belgian music awards ceremony

1st World Soundtrack Awards

October 18, 2001

Best Original Soundtrack:

Le fabuleux destin
d'Amélie Poulain

The 1st World Soundtrack Awards were given on 18 October 2001 in Ghent, Belgium.

== Winners ==
- Soundtrack Composer of the Year:
  - A.I.: Artificial Intelligence – John Williams
- Best Original Soundtrack of the Year:
  - Le fabuleux destin d'Amélie Poulain (Amélie) – Yann Tiersen
- Best Original Score of the Year Not Released on an Album:
  - Bridget Jones's Diary – Patrick Doyle
- Best Original Song Written for a Film:
  - "Come What May" – Moulin Rouge!
    - Composed by David Baerwald
- Most Creative Use of Existing Material on a Soundtrack:
  - Moulin Rouge! – Baz Luhrmann, Craig Armstrong and Marius De Vries
- Public Choice Award:
  - A.I.: Artificial Intelligence – John Williams
- Discovery of the Year:
  - Craig Armstrong – Moulin Rouge!
- Lifetime Achievement Award:
  - Elmer Bernstein
