= Igor (soundtrack) =

Igor (Original Motion Picture Soundtrack)

Film score by Patrick Doyle
- Released: September 30, 2008
- Recorded: 2008
- Studio: Bulgarian National Radio, Bulgaria; Abbey Road Studios, London; AIR-Edel Studios, London
- Genre: Film score
- Length: 61:29
- Label: Varèse Sarabande
- Producer: Maggie Rodford

Patrick Doyle chronology
Nim's Island (2008)	Igor (2008)	Main Street (2010)

Igor (Original Motion Picture Soundtrack) is the film score soundtrack to the 2008 film Igor directed by Tony Leondis. The film score is composed by Patrick Doyle and released through Varèse Sarabande label on September 30, 2008.

== Development ==
Leondis considered Doyle as one of his favorite film composers. He approached him during October 2007 and showed him the film without music and concept drawings, which got the composer "immediately excited." Doyle had a huge respect for animated films, recalling his experiences on watching Fantasia (1940) at his childhood and fascinated on its homage of music and drama in the form of animation. Hence, he would score animated films the same way he did for live action, as the process of scoring was all about heightening the drama and capturing the character's image.

When Leondis presented him the opening minutes of the film as a piece of music, Doyle found it to be dark and needed more action and rhythm, but Leondis wanted something "slightly eastern" referencing Bulgarian and Hungarian music. He provided Doyle musical inspirations from composers Béla Bartók—one of the first composers he studied during his school times—who uses Hungarian music, as did Ralph Vaughan Williams. As a result, he was influenced by Bartók's work and borrowed his inspiration for the thematic writing. Since the film had gothic elements, Doyle used choral samples which merged into the film's dark themes.

Doyle wrote themes for different types of characters, resulting in a score that incorporates multiple styles and providing a "rich pallet for thematic material." This includes the use of tango tinge to Dr. Schadenfreude's dance-y side and a piano concerto for Eva's theme. Doyle predominantly used clarinet because of its versatility on providing both melancholic and comic side. The piano was also a recurring instrument, especially for Eve's theme as it provides action and drama, which utilized through the use of basses and cellos. The music had to be played for real with sincerity, which was the main objective of the score. One of the challenges he considered working on an animated film, was allowing the score to be "very precise, very exact" and use specific instruments in a traditional way, instead of a cheesy way of scoring animated films.

The soundtrack also includes five Louis Prima songs. According to producer, Max Howard, "The combination creates an unusual effect and adds a surprise element to the film". "Pocketful of Sunshine" by Natasha Bedingfield was featured in the film's end credits, but not included on the soundtrack.

== Critical reception ==
According to Jonathan Broxton of Movie Music UK, "three-and-a-half stars is in no way a bad rating. It's more a case of Doyle himself, and of me expecting great things with each and every new score. The fact that Igor, by Doyle's incredibly high standards, is just not as compelling as the majority of his other works, leaves me feeling a tiny bit disappointed." Christian Clemmensen of Filmtracks wrote "The listening experience on album requires significant editing into your own compilations, but Doyle's overall approach is fresh and affable. The highlights, from solo piano to massive gothic harmonics, are too strong to brush aside because of the genre's limitations or this particular film's flaws."

Jeanette Catsoulis of The New York Times noted that Doyle's score accompanied with the soundtrack "bobbing with the bawdy sentiments of Louis Prima". Justin Chang of Variety and Stephen Farber of The Hollywood Reporter described the score "gothic" and "funny". A reviewer from Animated Antic wrote "Speaking of music, the score by Patrick Doyle was very bad. Normally, I love his work and think he's an excellent composer but he didn't bring his A-game here."

== Track listing ==
No.	Title	Length
1.	"Eva"	3:07
2.	"Igor"	4:47
3.	"Scamper & Brain"	2:32
4.	"Schadenfreude"	1:39
5.	"Hi Heidi"	1:05
6.	"Except the King"	1:41
7.	"Evil Bone"	3:30
8.	"Blind Orphans"	1:24
9.	"Brain Wash"	1:29
10.	"Oven Bun"	3:18
11.	"Acting Me Me Me"	1:58
12.	"Cliff Chase"	2:42
13.	"Plucky Eva"	3:15
14.	"Opening Night Presents"	3:45
15.	"Hot Tub Rub"	3:16
16.	"Falling for Director"	2:36
17.	"Evil Science Fair"	3:08
18.	"Secret Passage"	1:36
19.	"Through the Clouds"	2:13
20.	"Let's Get Evil"	1:17
21.	"Evil Annie"	6:51
22.	"Malaria Community Theatre"	2:41
23.	"Wistful Thinking"	1:39
Total length:		61:29

== Personnel ==
Credits adapted from CD liner notes:

- Music composer – Patrick Doyle
- Music producer – Maggie Rodford
- Performer – The Bulgarian Symphony Orchestra and Choir
- Orchestration – Geoff Alexander, James Shearman, Patrick Doyle
- Conductor – James Shearman
- Programming – Christian Howes
- Recording – Nick Wollage, Nick Taylor
- Mixing – Nick Wollage, Tom Bullen, Vladislav Boyadjiev
- Mastering – Andy Walter
- Score editor – Chris Benstead
- Executive producer – Robert Townson
- Production manager – Asen Kanchev
- Music preparation – Jill Streater, Vic Fraser
