= Alright, Already: Live in Montréal =

Alright, Already - Live in Montréal

EP by Rufus Wainwright
- Released: March 15, 2005
- Genre: Pop
- Label: Geffen

Rufus Wainwright chronology
Want Two (2003)	Alright, Already - Live in Montréal (2005)	Release the Stars (2007)

Alright, Already - Live in Montréal is Rufus Wainwright's second EP, released electronically by Geffen Records via iTunes in the United States and Canada on March 15, 2005, and later in Germany on March 29. It contains six live tracks, recorded during a snowstorm in Montreal.

== Track listing ==
1. "Poses" (5:17)
2. "This Love Affair" (3:41)
3. "The Art Teacher" (3:50)
4. "Rebel Prince" (3:40)
5. "Crumb by Crumb" (3:55)
6. "Gay Messiah" (3:29)

Track listing adapted from the iTunes Store
