= Live in Montreal =

Live in Montreal may refer to:

- Live in Montreal (Quo Vadis album)
- Live in Montreal (October Sky album)
- Live in Montreal, album by Bobby McFerrin
- Live in Montreal 1977, album by Emerson Lake and Palmer
- Live in Montreal, album by Gino Vannelli
- Live in Montreal, album by Hiromi Uehara and Edmar Castañeda
- Live in Montreal, album by Nikki Yanofsky
- Live in Montreal, album by Zachary Richard
- Alright, Already: Live in Montréal Rufus Wainwright's second EP
- Absent Lovers: Live in Montreal live album (2-CD set) by the band King Crimson
- Satchurated: Live in Montreal
