= Road Trip Elegies =

Road Trip Elegies: Montreal to New York is an Audible Original production by Canadian-American musician Rufus Wainwright, released in November 2020. The "audio-only musical narrative" sees Wainwright recreate a trip from Montreal to New York City that he often took with his late mother, Kate McGarrigle. It includes field recordings, songs from Wainwright's discography, and live performances recorded at McCabe's Guitar Shop in California.
