= World Soundtrack Award for Best Original Score of the Year Not Released on an Album =

Belgian music award

Best Original Score of the Year Not Released on an Album is one of two categories at the World Soundtrack Awards that was retired after the first year of the World Soundtrack Awards. The other was the World Soundtrack Award for Most Creative Use of Existing Material on a Soundtrack.

== Winner and nominees ==
- 2001 Bridget Jones's Diary - Patrick Doyle
  - Antitrust - Don Davis
  - Blow - Graeme Revell
  - Moulin Rouge! - Craig Armstrong
  - Pauline & Paulette - Frédéric Devreese
