= Waiting for a Want =

EP by Rufus Wainwright
- Released: June 29, 2004
- Genre: Pop
- Length: 14:43
- Label: DreamWorks
- Producer: Marius de Vries

Rufus Wainwright chronology
Want One (2003)	Waiting for a Want (2004)	Want Two (2004)

Waiting for a Want is the first EP by Canadian-American singer-songwriter Rufus Wainwright, released through DreamWorks Records electronically on June 29, 2004. At the time it was released, the collection previewed Wainwright's forthcoming album, Want Two. Initially planned to be released shortly after Want One, after plans of a double album fell through, the purchase of DreamWorks by Interscope delayed the release of Want Two. The EP provided listeners with new material during this period. Admitting that he wanted to release "a couple of ditties" before the United States presidential election of 2004, Wainwright described the collection as "some of the more daunting tracks, the operatic, weird stuff, some heavy numbers that relate to my classical sensibilities".

Songs from the EP were produced by Marius de Vries, who collaborated with Wainwright for both Want albums, with mixing by Andy Bradfield (de Vries and Bradfield both mixed "Waiting for a Dream"). Guests include family members Martha Wainwright and Suzzy Roche, fellow musicians Teddy Thompson and Joan Wasser, and orchestral arrangements by Van Dyke Parks. Album artwork was made available for download from Wainwright's official website. Critical reception of the EP was mixed, and it did not win awards or chart in any nation.

== Songs ==
"The Art Teacher" has been compared to a short story "in which a lonely woman looks back on a delirious schoolgirl crush". This version, recorded live at Le Metropolis in Montreal, is slightly different from the version that would appear on Want Two, and does not feature the overdubbed horn solo. Wainwright has stated the song was inspired by a straight man that he met at the gym who told stories about his female students that had crushes on him.

Wainwright stated the following of "Gay Messiah", which describes a savior who will descend from the stars of Studio 54 and sunbathe on the beaches of Fire Island:

Interestingly enough this started off as a party song. What Passion of the Christ is to Christians this song is to the gay world. It's definitely a protest song, and I want people to hear it so I wrote it so that musically, it would be rather simple and accessible.

The ballad "This Love Affair" "finds Wainwright trying his hand at concocting a modern-day standard and pulling it off with just the right mood and texture". Wainwright believes the song represents a perfect example of one of his own songs, being "emotional yet structured", "melancholy yet tough", and "very personal and universal at the same time".

"Waiting for a Dream" has been characterized as a "lush, enveloping, surreal excursion through a troubled subconscious". The political song addresses George W. Bush's first term as President of the United States, claiming, "There's a fire in the priory, and an ogre in the Oval Office".

== Critical reception ==
Professional ratings
Review scores
Source	Rating
Entertainment Weekly	(B+)
Paste	(unfavorable)

Reception of the EP was mixed. Making the case that EPs are "outlets for rejected or leftover material too out-there to fit onto an album", David Browne of Entertainment Weekly wrote that Waiting for a Want is just that, a "series of pop-opera reveries more rococo than Wainwright's norm". Browne complimented "Waiting for a Dream" and "Gay Messiah".

Paste's Bud Scoppa claimed that the four-track collection lacked the "psychologically potent songs and gorgeous arrangements" that appeared on Want One, insisting that sociocultural commentary is not Wainwright's "sweet spot". Expanding on this, Scoppa asserted that the politically driven songs "Gay Messiah" and "Waiting for a Dream" are earnest, but not worth listening to multiple times. Scoppa did, however, praise "The Art Teacher" and "This Love Affair".

In his review for Salon.com, Thomas Bartlett called "Gay Messiah" boring and criticized the "clumsy, literal-minded" lyrics in "The Art Teacher". Bartlett complimented "This Love Affair" and "Waiting for a Dream", comparing the latter's downtempo electronic pop style to the "better" songs on Wainwright's second album, Poses.

== Track listing ==
All songs written by Wainwright.

1. "The Art Teacher" – 3:58
2. "Gay Messiah" – 3:14
3. "This Love Affair" – 3:15
4. "Waiting for a Dream" – 4:16

== Personnel ==
- Rufus Wainwright – vocals (1–4), piano (1,3–4), additional vocals (2), acoustic guitar (2), orchestral arrangements (3–4)
- Christopher Cardona – violin (3–4)
- Cenovia Cummins – violin (3–4)
- Marius de Vries – programming (2,4), orchestral arrangements (3–4), keyboards (4)
- Danielle Farina – viola (3–4)
- Alison Gordon – viola (3–4)
- Isobel Griffiths – horn contractor (4)
- Eric Hammelman – viola (3–4)
- Jeff Hill – bass (2,4)
- Matt Johnson – drums (2)
- Julia Kent – cello (3–4)
- Vivienne Kim – violin (3–4)
- Julianne Klopotic – violin (3–4)
- Alexandra Knoll – oboe (3)
- Kathryn Lockwood – viola (3–4)
- Maxim Moston – violin (3–4), concertmaster (3–4), orchestral arrangements (3–4)
- Jenni Muldaur – additional vocals (2)
- Fiona Murray – violin (3–4)
- Van Dyke Parks – orchestral arrangements (3–4)
- Carlo Pellettieri – cello (3–4)
- Troy Rinker Jr. – bass (3–4)
- Suzzy Roche – additional vocals (2)
- David Sapadin – clarinet (3)
- Jane Scarpantoni – cello (3–4)
- Daniel Shelly – bassoon (3)
- Antoine Silverman – violin (3–4)
- Alexis Smith – programming (2,4)
- Teddy Thompson – additional vocals (2)
- Martha Wainwright – additional vocals (2)
- Joan Wasser – violin (3–4)
- Anja Wood – cello (3–4)
