= Dinner at Eight (song) =

Song by Rufus Wainwright

from the album Want One
- Released: 2003
- Length: 4:33
- Songwriter: Rufus Wainwright

"Dinner at Eight" is a song written and performed by American-Canadian singer-songwriter Rufus Wainwright. It originally appeared on his third studio album, Want One (2003).

== Composition ==
"Dinner at Eight" is the final track on Wainwright's third studio album, Want One (2003), and later appeared on Vibrate: The Best of Rufus Wainwright, his 2014 greatest hits album. The ballad describes a confrontation over dinner at a restaurant between Wainwright and his father, Loudon Wainwright III. Wainwright recalled:

We had just done a shoot for Rolling Stone together, and I told him he must be really happy that I got him back in that magazine after all these years. That sort of kicked things off. Later in the evening he threatened to kill me. So I went home and wrote 'Dinner at Eight' as a vindictive retort to his threat.

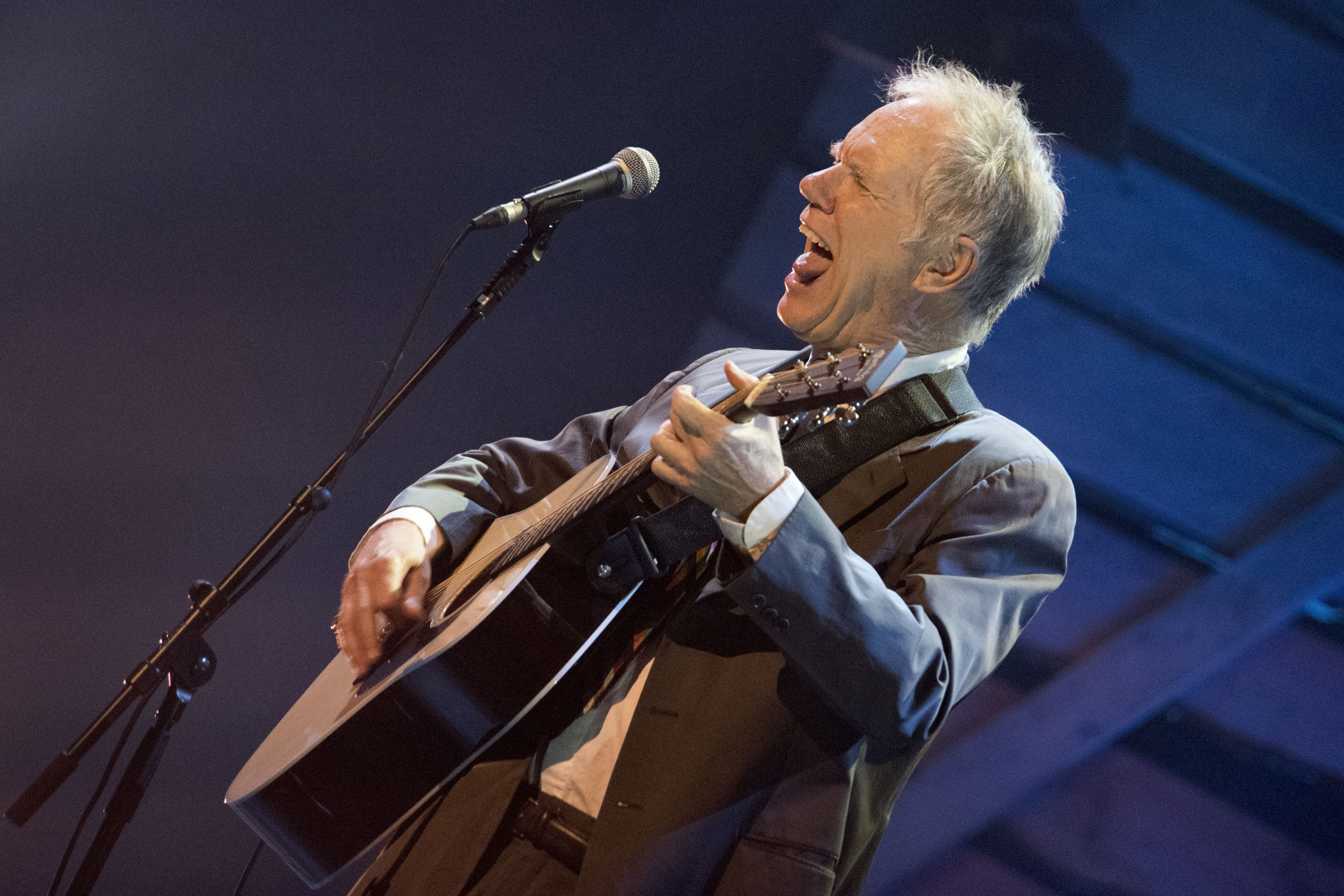
The song's lyrics describe a confrontation between Wainwright and his father, Loudon Wainwright III (pictured in 2015).

The song's lyrics compare Wainwright and his father to David and Goliath, respectively, and refer to "those old magazines". Wainwright takes some blame for their conflict, but also accuses his father of abandonment. According to Vanity Fair, "A seductive melody belies the angry first verse, prefiguring the compassionate final couplet, which has Rufus recalling a moment from his boyhood when he wept as Loudon was leaving Montreal after one of his infrequent visits." During the bridge, the singer invites his father to settle their differences, even if a long time into the future, and wants to see him cry. Wainwright acknowledges his father's love, but then repeats the opening verse, which is critical of their relationship, suggesting reconciliation will be difficult.

According to Wainwright, "Dinner at Eight" is a "good representation" of his relationship with his father, and "starts a little rough but is ultimately a love song". He has also said of his father and the song:

[My father] has, for better or worse, no filter whatsoever for what he does. And I admire that, because never have I known a more tormented artist than him. And I mean that respectfully, because he's just so affected by his artistic radar. We've had our feuds, on my part with 'Dinner at Eight', but I tend to be a little more romantic in my songs. He lives out every word of his.

Musically, the song has "classically-tinged" piano chords and "tender" strings. The music and Wainwright's vocals intensify during the bridge.

== Performances ==
Wainwright sings "Dinner at Eight" on the video album Live at the Fillmore, which was released in DVD format and accompanied his fourth studio album, Want Two (2004), as well as All I Want (2005), a DVD featuring a documentary film about Wainwright and live performances.

Wainwright has also performed the song live in concert throughout his career, since the release of Want One.

== Reception ==
The song has received a positive critical reception. The Guardian's Tim Adams described "Dinner at Eight" as "extraordinary" and the "most poignant expression" of Wainwright's many songs about desire. Jim Beviglia of American Songwriter said the song is "beautiful but devastating", and "sits at the end like a silent killer, creeping up to break your heart". Furthermore, he wrote, "On 'Dinner at Eight,' [Wainwright] delivered the kind of towering ballad that all artists crave, even if it took unearthing some ugly family history to do it... The wounds engendered from a fractious father-son relationship often run deep... Rufus Wainwright suggests that maybe the only way to truly set about healing those wounds is to pick at the scab." The Advocate's Michael Giltz called the song "wrenching", and in his review of Want One, said "Dinner at Eight" was one of three tracks on the album that made Wainwright's music "more convincingly personal and sincere than ever". In 2015, Wainwright selected "Dinner at Eight" as one of eight "songs that defined him".
