= Rufus Does Judy at Capitol Studios =

2021 virtual concert by Rufus Wainwright

Live album by Rufus Wainwright
- Released: June 10, 2022
- Length: 41:41
- Label: BMG

Rufus Wainwright chronology
Unfollow the Rules (2020)	Rufus Does Judy at Capitol Studios (2022)	Folkocracy (2023)

Rufus Does Judy at Capitol Studios is a live album by Rufus Wainwright released by BMG on June 10, 2022. The album was recorded at Capitol Studios, during a virtual concert of the same name, which saw Wainwright re-create Judy Garland's live album Judy at Carnegie Hall. The filmed performance premiered on Veeps on June 10, 2021, which would have been Garland's 99th birthday. The concert featured an in-studio duet with Kristin Chenoweth and a virtual duet with Martha Wainwright.

Previously, Wainwright performed the set at Carnegie Hall in 2006, which was released as the live album Rufus Does Judy at Carnegie Hall (2007). He also released the DVD Rufus! Rufus! Rufus! Does Judy! Judy! Judy!: Live from the London Palladium, featuring live recordings from his 2007 show at London Palladium, and performed the set again at Carnegie Hall in 2016.

== Description ==
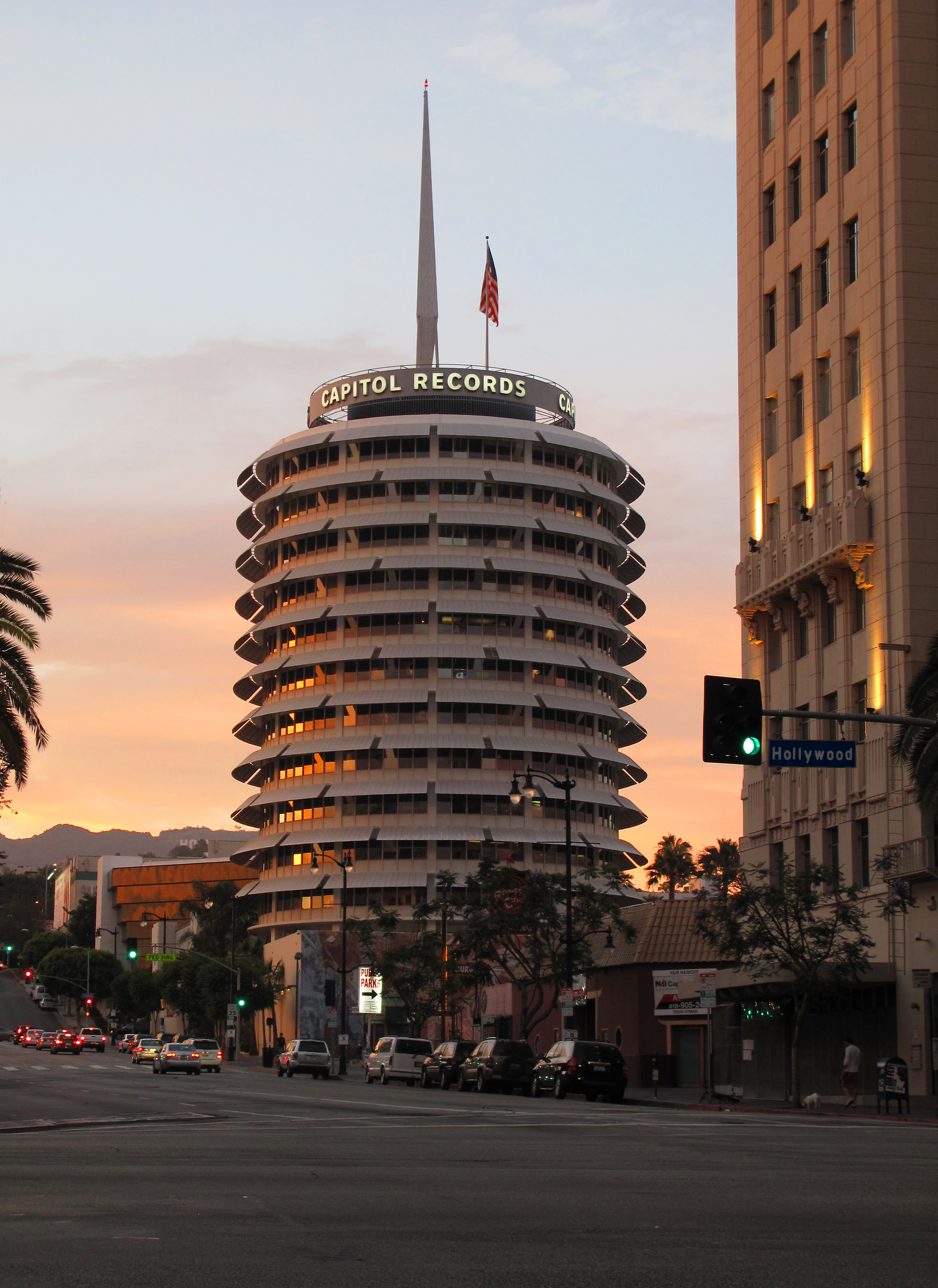
The album was recorded at Capitol Studios, which is located in the basement of the Capitol Records building in Hollywood, California.

Wainwright was backed by a four-piece band. Renée Zellweger was the only live audience member.

== Promotion ==
The concert was promoted with the release of "Over the Rainbow" and a limited edition T-shirt created in collaboration with Michael Kors. Wainwright performed "Come Rain or Come Shine" on The Late Late Show with James Corden.

== Track listing ==
Rufus Does Judy at Capitol Studios track listing
No.	Title	Length
1.	"Come Rain or Come Shine"	3:57
2.	"Alone Together"	2:51
3.	"I Can't Give You Anything but Love"	6:39
4.	"Puttin' On the Ritz"	1:56
5.	"The Man That Got Away"	4:58
6.	"A Foggy Day"	3:01
7.	"How Long Has This Been Going On?"	5:04
8.	"Just You, Just Me"	1:23
9.	"You're Nearer"	1:46
10.	"Happy Days Are Here Again / Get Happy" (featuring Kristin Chenoweth)	2:26
11.	"Medley: You Made Me Love You / For Me and My Gal / The Trolley Song"	3:22
12.	"Over the Rainbow"	4:18
Total length:		41:41
