= All I Want (Rufus Wainwright DVD) =

Video by Rufus Wainwright
- Released: April 8, 2005
- Genre: Pop
- Length: Approx. 200 min.
- Label: Geffen
- Director: George Scott

All I Want is a 2005 DVD that contains the documentary, A Portrait of Rufus Wainwright, along with live performances, music videos, interviews and more. The documentary features background information about Rufus' childhood, teen years and family, and how each of his first four albums were influenced. Celebrities providing commentary during the film include Elton John, Sting, Keane, and Jake Shears and Babydaddy of the Scissor Sisters; family members interviewed include his mother, Kate McGarrigle, and sister Martha Wainwright.

The DVD was produced by Nick de Grunwald and Martin R. Smith.

== Track listing for live performances ==
1. "Gay Messiah"
2. "Crumb by Crumb"
3. "Rebel Prince"
4. "The Art Teacher"
5. "This Love Affair"
6. "Poses"
7. "Movies of Myself"
8. "Go or Go Ahead
9. "I Don't Know What It Is"
10. "Beautiful Child"
11. "Beauty Mark"
12. "Cigarettes and Chocolate Milk"
13. "Dinner at Eight"

== Easter Eggs ==
- Rufus and Martha's parody sketch for the Governor General's Award ceremony honoring Kate & Anna McGarrigle
- 1998 holiday Gap commercial featuring Rufus' performance of "What Are You Doing New Year's Eve?"
