= Want One =

Studio album by Rufus Wainwright
- Released: September 23, 2003
- Recorded: The Maid's Room (NYC), Bearsville Studio A, Loho Studios (NYC), Looking Glass Studios (NYC) and The Strongroom (London)
- Genres: Pop; baroque pop; chamber pop; rock
- Length: 58:17
- Label: DreamWorks
- Producer: Marius de Vries

Rufus Wainwright chronology
Poses (2001)	Want One (2003)	Want Two (2004)

Singles from Want One
- 1. "I Don't Know What It Is" Released: July 26, 2004 (UK); 2. "Oh What a World" Released: November 8, 2004 (UK)

Want One is the third studio album by the Canadian-American singer-songwriter Rufus Wainwright, released through DreamWorks Records on September 23, 2003. The album was produced by Marius de Vries and mixed by Andy Bradfield, with Lenny Waronker as the executive in charge of production. Want One spawned two singles: "I Don't Know What It Is", which peaked at number 74 on the UK Singles Chart, and "Oh What a World". The album charted in three countries, reaching number 60 on the Billboard 200, number 130 in France, and number 77 in the Netherlands.

Want One features guest vocals from Martha Wainwright, Joan Wasser, Teddy Thompson and Linda Thompson, as well as a banjo solo on "14th Street" by Wainwright's mother Kate McGarrigle. For the album, Wainwright won the award for Outstanding Music Artist at the 15th GLAAD Media Awards, won Best New Recording and received a nomination for Best Songwriter at the OutMusic Awards, and was nominated for the 2004 Shortlist Music Prize.

It was the first part of what was intended to be a double album called Want. The second part, Want Two, was released the following year. Want One was later repackaged along with Want Two as a two-disc set titled Want and was released on November 28, 2005 in the UK to coincide with Wainwright's tour.

== Promotion ==
=== Singles ===
Want One's first single was "I Don't Know What It Is", released in a slim-line jewel case on July 26, 2004 in the UK. It included two B-sides: "L'absence" (a French aria from Hector Berlioz's Les nuits d'été, op. 7) and "14th Street", both of which were recorded live at The Fillmore in San Francisco in March 2004. "I Don't Know What It Is" appeared on the UK Singles Chart for one week, entering on August 7, 2004 and reaching its peak position at number 74. "Oh What a World" was the second single from the album, released digitally via iTunes and 7digital in the UK on November 8, 2004. Promotional copies were distributed to radio stations.

=== Other forms of promotion ===
The album was released as a double vinyl promo, retaining the original artwork. Vinyl was never pressed for commercial outlets at the time of release and these promo copies sell for over $75 US in the secondary market. While no official music videos were produced to promote the album, live videos of "Beautiful Child" and "Vibrate" were made available for download on iTunes. A thirty-second commercial which contained audio samples of "Oh What a World" and "I Don't Know What It Is" aired on television just prior to the album's release. "Vibrate" and "Natasha" featured in season two of Nip/Tuck.

Wainwright made several television appearances in 2003, including the Late Show with David Letterman on June 27 ("Dinner at Eight"), The Sharon Osbourne Show on November 4 ("Vibrate"), Letterman's show again on October 6 ("I Don't Know What It Is"), The Late Late Show on November 11 ("Vibrate"), and Breakfast with the Arts on December 21 ("Dinner at Eight" and "Spotlight on Christmas"). 2004 television appearances included Jimmy Kimmel Live! on March 3 ("Gay Messiah"), The Vicki Gabereau Show on April 9 ("Dinner at Eight"), Later... with Jools Holland on May 14 ("Vibrate"), and The Frank Skinner Show on November 4 ("Oh What a World"). Wainwright also appeared on Play, CNN's "Headline News" and a local airing of Central Park SummerStage to promote Want One. Live at the Fillmore, which contained songs from Want One and later accompanied the release of Want Two, originally aired as a special on the cable television network Trio in May 2004.

== Songs ==
The album's opener, "Oh What a World", has been described as a, "choir of harmonies building to a full orchestra that finds Wainwright leading what can only be described as a masterpiece of horns, harmonies and hope". "I Don't Know What It Is", the album's first single, "climbs to a soaring Beatles-esque climax of train rides". Wainwright revealed the source and meaning of the song:

When I first came up with the lines, I don't know what it is, but you got to do it/ I don't know where to go but you got to be there, I was at this party for The Strokes in New York. There was this prevailing sense of, 'We're not quite sure what's happening or what is cool, but we know that it's somewhere around here, in this room.' It was this vague confusion, with everybody kind of sniffing for blood. It wasn't that it was a bad party, or that I don't like The Strokes; I just think there's a lot of confusion right now in the music business. Then, later on, I realized the song was really personal. I didn't know where I was, and I didn't know I was actually lost. It wasn't about the party at all; it's about searching but not knowing what you're searching for. There's the train motif, being on this train heading for either oblivion or salvation – and just holding on for dear life. That song came down from some mountain somewhere, because it was right after I wrote it that I sort of packed it in.

"Vicious World", which features "soft, Björkian keyboards and twinkling electronic sounds" and "sounds like it's got about 350 multi-tracked vocals", has been characterized by Wainwright as "one of those happy/sad songs", referring to the song's joyous sound but negative lyrics. Wainwright said the following of "Movies of Myself", with its "straight-ahead bounce, drum-led clip, and aberrant guitar crunch":

The song is about knowing the end result of every situation you're in, and being able to play it out in your mind and see it before it happens. It's about addiction, really, about knowing how it's all going to end up. In that sense, you're watching a movie of yourself all the time – and then you want out of that movie.

Slant Magazine's Sal Cinquemani described "Go or Go Ahead" as a "multi-tiered, emotionally-charged epic that could pass for a paranoid Radiohead song".

"Dinner at Eight" is one of many songs from the Wainwright family about inter-familial strife. It was composed in response to a fight with Rufus's father, acclaimed singer-songwriter Loudon Wainwright III. The two had recently finished a photo shoot for Rolling Stone and were eating together when Rufus joked that his success had gotten his father back into the magazine. This escalated into a very heated exchange. Rufus composed the song later that night; its title refers to the meal and makes reference to the fight in the lyrics. It also recounts his father leaving the family when Rufus was young. Though unreleased as a single in the U.S., Rufus performed the song on Late Show with David Letterman on October 6, 2013.

== Album references ==
The title of the first track comes from The Wizard of Oz, in which the Wicked Witch of the West screams "Oh, what a world! What a world!" as she is melting away. Maurice Ravel's Boléro is musically referenced throughout the track. "I Don't Know What It Is" contains several allusions to the American sitcom Three's Company, specifically the opening theme song, with phrases such as "Take a step that is new", "...thinks Three's Company", and "So I knock on the door". The lyrics "Taking the Santa Fe and the Atchison, Topeka" is a reference to Judy Garland's 1946 musical film The Harvey Girls, which itself contains a reference to the Atchison, Topeka and Santa Fe Railway with the song "On the Atchison, Topeka and the Santa Fe". "I Don't Know What It Is" also mentions several geographic locations, including Calais, Dover, Poland, Limbo, and Lower Manhattan.

The flute arrangement in "Vicious World" is a reference to Richard Wagner's opera Die Meistersinger von Nürnberg. "Movies of Myself" mentions a Saturday Evening Post edition by Jesus as well as "an old piece of bacon never eaten by Elvis", referring to a story that Wainwright heard about someone who purchased a framed piece of bacon on eBay that at one time belonged to musician Elvis Presley. "Go or Go Ahead" contains celestial and mythological references, from angels, stars, planets, and Mars to vampires and Medusa (along with the phrase "Look in her eyes"), a female chthonic monster that turns onlookers to stone.

"Vibrate" references pop star Britney Spears and fairy tale character Pinocchio, while "14th Street" refers to the nursery rhyme about Little Bo Peep. The latter also has the phrase "And there'll be rainbows", referring to Judy Garland's classic ballad "Over the Rainbow" from The Wizard of Oz. "Natasha" was written for and about Wainwright's friend, actress Natasha Lyonne, who has had public struggles with substance abuse and health problems.

The album's title track, "Want", alludes to Wainwright's parents Loudon Wainwright III and Kate McGarrigle, and mentions musicians John Lennon and Leonard Cohen as well as 3rd Rock from the Sun cast members John Lithgow and Jane Curtin. In "11:11", "Put away your posies, I'm gonna have a drink before we ring around the rosies" refers to the nursery rhyme "Ring Around the Rosie", which is commonly said to be about the black plague. The last verse, which mentions "something burning" in Manhattan, alludes to the September 11 attacks and the collapse of the World Trade Center towers. "Dinner at Eight" was written about a disagreement Wainwright and his father had at a photo shoot for Rolling Stone. The song contains an allusion to the Biblical story of David and Goliath with the phrase "I'm gonna take you down with one little stone".

== Critical reception ==
Professional ratings
Aggregate scores
Source	Rating
Metacritic	72/100
Review scores
Source	Rating
AllMusic	2.5/5 stars
Entertainment Weekly	A−
The Independent	3/5 stars
Los Angeles Times	4/4 stars
Mojo	4/5 stars
NME	7/10
Pitchfork	6.9/10
Q	4/5 stars
Rolling Stone	4/5 stars
Spin	C−

Overall, reception of the album was positive. AllMusic's Zac Johnson described the album as "another set of obscenely lush and opulent pop operettas... meticulously layered and richly textured, with full orchestral passages and many-throated harmonies". After praising the album, Johnson concluded that Wainwright "could be singing lists of names out of the phone book and it would still be more exciting and inventive than 99 percent of the other albums out there". Wainwright's style caused Sal Cinquemani of Slant to draw comparisons to a giant peacock's kaleidoscopic tail, and he insisted that producer Marius de Vries "[kept] the singer's opulent poperas and lush ballads in check while bringing them to a new level of lovely pageantry". Cinquemani also asserted that Want One had a "balanced mix of rollicking rock operas" and "quiet piano ballads".

Entertainment Weekly's Marc Weingarten characterized the album as a "gorgeous meditation on emotional displacement", with "clever, gently ironic wordplay". In his review for Rolling Stone, David Fricke called the album a record of "breathtaking, eccentric opulence" and a "loving nod to the vocal and poetic gifts he inherited from his parents", folk musicians Loudon Wainwright III and Kate McGarrigle. Fricke concluded: "With the sumptuous honesty of Want One, their son is now his own man".

However, the album did receive some criticism, mostly pertaining to its lavish and decadent style. Blender's RJ Smith called Wainwright's "carnival-esque piano playing... so thick, the music all but drowns in pretty surfaces". The Independent mostly complimented Want One, though its review revealed a preference for the simpler tracks like "Want" and "Dinner at Eight", "when it's just him and his piano". The review also criticized "Movies of Myself", describing the song as having "plaintive vocals [that] jar against stadium-rock guitars and dubious Eighties keyboards". Contrastingly, Pitchfork's review singles out "Vibrate", "Natasha", "Pretty Things", and "Want" for being "simply too sparse to offer any real substance".

"Dinner at Eight" in particular has received two other prominent raves. In 2010, while promoting the release of a live double album, David Bowie praised "Dinner at Eight" as "the best" father/son song he knew, calling Rufus "simply one of the great writers." In 2011, in Planet Word, author and BBC producer John-Paul Davidson, in a discussion of poetry and song, called Dinner at Eight "no finer expression of an argument between a son and a father who abandoned him."

== Legacy ==
The album was included in the book 1001 Albums You Must Hear Before You Die.

== Track listing ==
All songs on the album written by Wainwright:

1. "Oh What a World" – 4:23
2. "I Don't Know What It Is" – 4:51
3. "Vicious World" – 2:50
4. "Movies of Myself" – 4:31
5. "Pretty Things" – 2:40
6. "Go or Go Ahead" – 6:39
7. "Vibrate" – 2:44
8. "14th Street" – 4:44
9. "Natasha" – 3:29
10. "Harvester of Hearts" – 3:35
11. "Beautiful Child" – 4:16
12. "Want" – 5:11
13. "11:11" – 4:27
14. "Dinner at Eight" – 4:33

Bonus tracks

15. "Es Muß Sein" (UK and Japan releases) – 2:19
16. "Velvet Curtain Rag" (UK release) – 4:31

Bonus disc

The Black Session, No. 199 is a limited edition bonus disc that was included with the first pressing of the French release of Want One. It was recorded live on October 9, 2003.

1. "Want" (live)
2. "Leaving for Paris" (live)
3. "Dinner at Eight" (live)
4. "Coeur de Parisienne" (live)

== Personnel ==
- Rufus Wainwright – voice (1–14), piano (2,5,8,10,14), fender rhodes piano (3), recorders (3), acoustic guitar (4,6,11–13), keyboards (9), orchestral arrangements (1,2,7,9,14), choral arrangements (7)
- Sterling Campbell – drums (2–4,13)
- Simon C. Clarke – alto sax (1,8,11), baritone sax (1,8,10–11), flute (1,2,14), alto flute (1), piccolo (1)
- Marius de Vries – piano (1,7–8,12–13), programming (1–4,6–14), vibraphone (10,12), orchestral arrangements (1–2,7,14), choral arrangements (7)
- Chris Elliott – orchestral arrangements (1–2,7,9,14)
- Isobel Griffiths – orchestra contractor (1–2,7,14)
- Adrian Hallowell – bass trombone (8,11)
- Levon Helm – drums (8)
- Jeff Hill – bass (2,4,6,8,11–13)
- Nick Hitchens – tuba (1)
- Matt Johnson – drums (6,9,11–12)
- Alexandra Knoll – oboe (2)
- Gerry Leonard – guitar (2,8), electric guitar (4,6,11–13), mandolin (13)
- The London Oratory Choir – choir (7)
- Roddy Lorimer – trumpet (1,2,8,10–11), flugelhorn (10)
- Kate McGarrigle – banjo (8), accordion (14)
- John Holbrook, Bob Ebeling, Andy Bradfield, Marius de Vries – engineer
- Jack McKeever – Audio Engineering Assistance to Marius de Vries, Maids Room
- Struan Oglanby, Ian Dowling, Bill Synan, Sean Gould and Tom Gloady – Assistant Audio Engineer
- Maxim Moston – concertmaster (9), orchestral arrangements (1–2,7,9,14)
- Jenni Muldaur – additional vocals (8,12)
- Bernard O'Neill – Double bass (3,9–10)
- Tim Sanders – tenor sax (1,8,10–11)
- David Sapadin – clarinet (2)
- Charlie Sexton – guitar (2,8), electric guitar (4,6,11–12)
- Daniel Shelly – bassoon (2)
- Alexis Smith – programming (1–4,6–14)
- Joy Smith – harp (1–2,13–14)
- Paul Spong – trumpet (1–2,8,11)
- Dave Stewart – bass trombone (1–2,11)
- Linda Thompson – additional vocals (10)
- Teddy Thompson – additional vocals (10)
- Martha Wainwright – additional vocals (8,12)
- Annie Whitehead – trombone (1–2,8,10–11)
- Gavyn Wright – orchestra leader (1–2,7,14)
- Jimmy Zhivago – guitar (2), electric guitar (4), piano (8)

== Charts ==
Want One debuted at No. 60 on the Billboard 200, Wainwright's highest position on the chart until the release of his fifth studio album, Release the Stars (2007). The album reached peak positions of No. 130 in France and No. 77 in the Netherlands. Want One won Wainwright the award for Outstanding Music Artist at the 15th GLAAD Media Awards, an awards ceremony created by the Gay & Lesbian Alliance Against Defamation to recognize and honor the mainstream media for their fair representations of the gay community. The album also won the award for Best New Recording and earned Wainwright a nomination for Best Songwriter at the OutMusic Awards. Want One was nominated for the 2004 Shortlist Music Prize.

In 2006, both Want One and Want Two were included in Robert Dimery's book 1001 Albums You Must Hear Before You Die, and two years later Out ranked Poses No. 50 and Want One No. 80 on their "100 Greatest, Gayest Albums" list. "Want" is featured in Toby Creswell's 2006 book, 1001 Songs: The Great Songs of All Time and the Artists, Stories and Secrets Behind Them. The album was recognized as one of the "50 best albums of the decade" by Paste in 2009, appearing as No. 16 on the list.

Chart	Peak position
French Albums (SNEP)	130
Dutch Albums (Album Top 100)	77
US Billboard 200	60
Scottish Albums (Official Charts)	97
UK Albums (Official Charts)	88

The following table displays some of the 2003 "End of Year" list placements by various publications.

Publication	Country	Accolade	Rank
Gaffa	Denmark	Top 20 Foreign Albums	7
Mojo	UK	Albums of the Year	21
Paste	US	Albums of the Year	1
Rolling Stone	US	Albums of the Year	5
Uncut	UK	Uncut Albums of the Year	37
VH1	US	The Best Albums of 2003	1
