= The Art Teacher =

2004 song by Rufus Wainwright

Song by Rufus Wainwright

from the EP Waiting for a Want
- Released: June 29, 2004
- Length: 4:00 (Waiting for a Want); 3:51 (Want Two)
- Songwriter: Rufus Wainwright
- Producer: Marius de Vries (Want Two)

"The Art Teacher" is a song written and performed by American-Canadian singer-songwriter Rufus Wainwright. It originally appeared on his extended play (EP), Waiting for a Want, released by DreamWorks Records in June 2004 as a preview of his fourth studio album, Want Two, which was released by Geffen Records in November 2004. The lyrics in the piano ballad describe a middle-aged woman's recollection of an unrequited love for her teacher. The song explores gender and sexuality, and its music has been compared to work by Philip Glass.

"The Art Teacher" has received a generally positive reception, and appears on other releases in Wainwright's discography, including Live at the Fillmore, a concert film accompanying Want Two. The song also appears on Vibrate: The Best of Rufus Wainwright, a greatest hits album, and the live album Rufus Wainwright: Live from the Artists Den, both of which were released in 2014.

== Composition ==
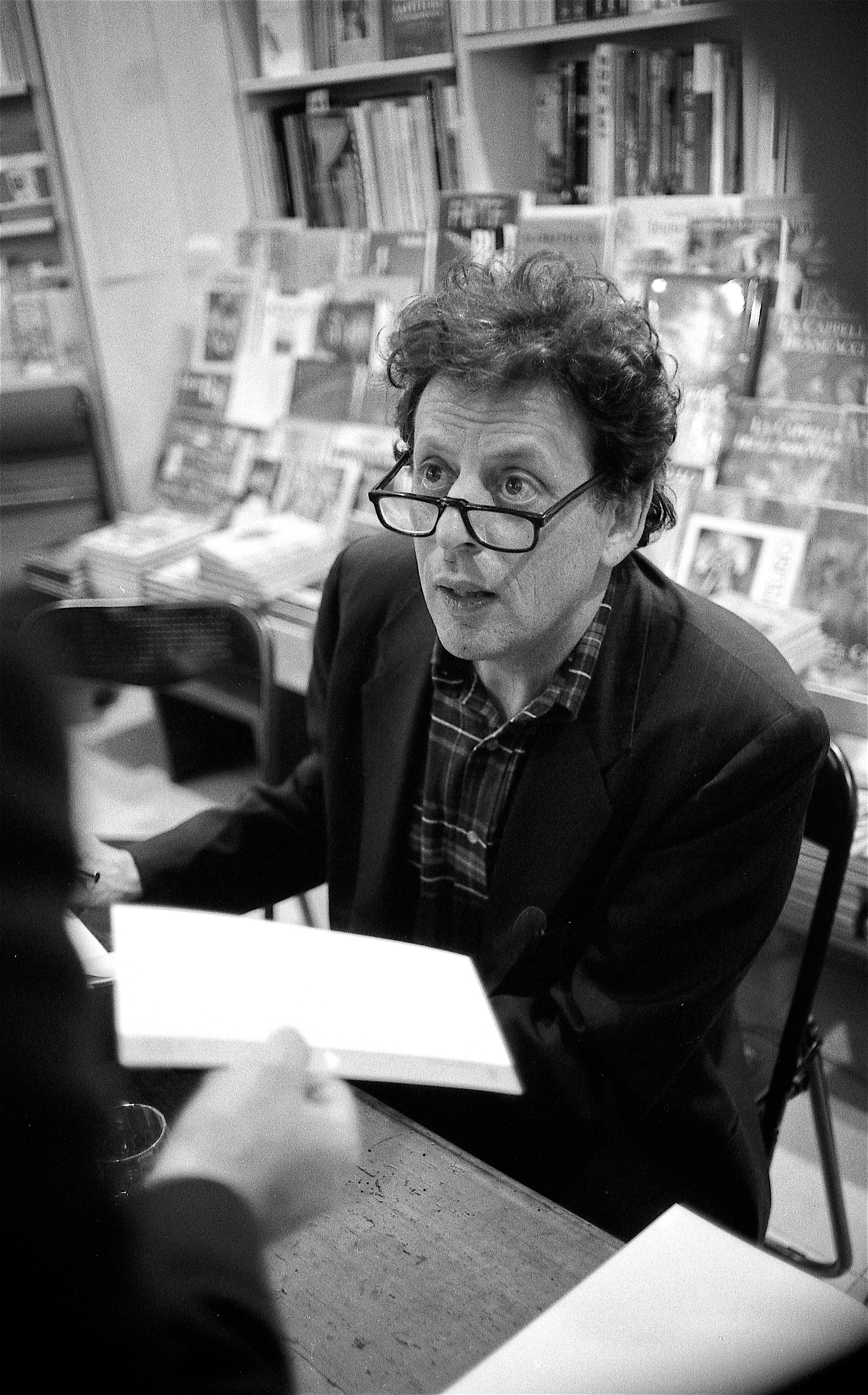
The song's music has been compared to work by composer Philip Glass (pictured in 2006)

"The Art Teacher" was written by Rufus Wainwright. According to the singer, the song was inspired by a heterosexual male teacher who spoke of his infatuated female students. Wainwright recalled:

It's a song about a guy I met at the gym who of course was straight. He'd tell me stories about his female students who were ravenous for him. So I put myself in their shoes to write the song. I played it for him and it went totally over his head!

The music in the song has been compared to Philip Glass's work, with Wainwright's "round vocals [leaping] from deep lows to piqued highs". According to The Guardian, the ostinato song has a simple harmony and melody, and sounds like a Philip Glass composition." Pitchfork's Stephen Deusner described "The Art Teacher" as "a woman remembering her first love, the instructor of the title who turned her on to Romantic painter J. M. W. Turner", with the story told "over a Philip Glass prism of piano chords, a plaintive horn, and a slightly sped-up tempo". Youa Vang of City Pages described the song as melancholic, with a "rumbling" piano.

The lyrics in the piano ballad describe a middle-aged woman's recollection of an "unrequited schoolgirl crush". Bud Scoppa of Paste characterized the song as a short story "in which a lonely woman looks back on a delirious schoolgirl crush", and Mojo's Danny Eccleston said Wainwright "[inhabits] a woman's lifelong obsession with the titular pedagogue, as she relives a school trip to an art museum". According to Vang, the song tells the story "of a young girl who fell in love with her art teacher, telling how first loves are always the most intense and how no one after can compare". In 2014, Drowned in Sound's Marc Burrows called the song an exploration of Wainwright's sexuality. In addition to Turner, the song's lyrics reference the painters Peter Paul Rubens, Rembrandt, and John Singer Sargent as the teacher escorts his students through the Metropolitan Museum of Art.

== Recordings and performances ==
"The Art Teacher" originally appeared on Wainwright's EP, Waiting for a Want, released by DreamWorks Records in June 2004 as a preview of his fourth studio album, Want Two, which was released by Geffen Records in November 2004. The track was recorded live at Le Metropolis in Montreal by Guillaume Bengle and Rod Shearer; Marius de Vries is credited as the producer. According to The Guardian's Alexis Petridis, the live recording is "unadorned – you can hear Wainwright gasping for breath between each line". The EP version is slightly different from the Want Two version, which features an overdubbed horn solo.

The song appears on other releases in Wainwright's discography, including Live at the Fillmore, a concert film accompanying Want Two. The Want Two version also appears on Vibrate: The Best of Rufus Wainwright, a greatest hits album released in February 2014 by Universal Music Enterprises in Australia and Ireland, and in other nations subsequently. Wainwright performs "The Art Teacher" on the live album Rufus Wainwright: Live from the Artists Den, which was recorded in 2012 and released by Artists Den Records and Universal Music Enterprises in March 2014.

Wainwright performed the song on NPR Music's "Tiny Desk Concerts" series in August 2012. In December 2012, he sang "The Art Teacher", among other songs, at the Grammy Museum at L.A. Live's Clive Davis Theater as part of the museum's "An Evening With" series. Wainwright performed the song on the 22nd episode of American Public Media's program Wits ("Kristen Schaal with Rufus Wainwright"), which aired in April 2013, and during his appearance at Royal Albert Hall for The Proms, which was broadcast by the BBC in September 2014.

Wainwright has also performed the song live in concert. In his review of Wainwright's 2016 concert at Bristol's Colston Hall, Lou Trimby wrote: "Wainwright also writes brilliantly from the point of view of a woman – a prime example being 'The Art Teacher' which tells one of the saddest stories committed to music. His rendition convinced you that he was the female protagonist, not just playing a part but inhabiting her psyche."

== Reception ==
"The Art Teacher" has received a generally positive critical reception. Alexis Petridis called the song "lovely". In a review of Waiting for a Want, Bud Scoppa said "The Art Teacher" and "This Love Affair" were more engaging than the EP's two other tracks ("Gay Messiah" and "Waiting for a Dream"). Robert Christgau said the song "is worth saving" in his review of Want Two, in which he gave the album a "B−" rating.

In Danny Eccleston's review of Live from the Artists Den, he describes "The Art Teacher" as "a great, great song" and one of Wainwright's "best-loved numbers and for good reason". He writes, "It's transformational ... the tragedy of her unspoken love seems to resonate endlessly, as if bouncing mercilessly around in your chest." Sarah Metz, a media arts specialist for the National Endowment for the Arts and a contributor to its "Art Works Blog", related "The Art Teacher" to one of her own experiences in her 2015 article, "My Artist Crush: Rufus Wainwright": "I had developed a huge crush on one of my English teachers in high school, and was in awe of how he perfectly captured those feelings in a four-minute song." In The Cambridge Companion to the Singer-Songwriter (2016), Katherine Williams said the pronoun shifts within the song's lyrics allow Wainwright "play between genders", and noted that the singer usually sings in the first person.

In 2008, Brandon Summers of The Helio Sequence said the song introduced him to Wainwright's music, and that he now considers the singer-songwriter an artist he most admires. "The Art Teacher" appears on the soundtrack to Peter Hinton's 2013 stage adaptation of Oscar Wilde's Lady Windermere's Fan (1892).

== Credits and personnel ==
Credits adapted from the liner notes of Want Two.

- Rufus Wainwright – voice, piano
- Guillaume Bengle – engineering
- Marius de Vries – producer
- Isobel Griffiths – contracting (horns)
- Rod Shearer – engineering
