= Folkocracy =

2023 Rufus Wainwright album

Studio album by Rufus Wainwright
- Released: June 2, 2023
- Genres: Folk, Americana
- Length: 60:50
- Label: BMG
- Producer: Mitchell Froom

Rufus Wainwright chronology
Rufus Does Judy at Capitol Studios (2022)	Folkocracy (2023)

Folkocracy is a studio album by Rufus Wainwright, released by BMG on June 2, 2023.

== Composition ==
Folkocracy was produced by Mitchell Froom. Guests on the album include Anohni, Andrew Bird, David Byrne, Brandi Carlile, Sheryl Crow, Madison Cunningham, Susanna Hoffs, Chaka Khan, John Legend, Anna McGarrigle, Van Dyke Parks, Nicole Scherzinger, Chris Stills, and Chaim Tannenbaum.

== Promotion ==
"Down in the Willow Garden" served as the lead single. "Heading for Home" was the second single released. "Harvest" was released as the third single soon after.

A video for "Twelve-Thirty (young girls are coming to the canyon)", a short promotional video for "Hush Little Baby" and a live performance video in the studio of "Alone" were released as well in June and July 2023.

Over the summer, the album was promoted by the Folkocracy tour, on which most of the album was performed live with a band that included Rufus' sister, Lucy Wainwright Roche.

== Reception ==
Professional ratings
Review scores
Source	Rating
Pitchfork	7.3/10

Pitchfork rated the album 7.3 out of 10.

== Track listing ==
Folkocracy track listing
No.	Title	Writer(s)	Length
1.	"Alone" (featuring Madison Cunningham)	Ewan MacColl	3:14
2.	"Heading for Home" (featuring John Legend)	Peggy Seeger	4:22
3.	"Twelve-Thirty (Young Girls Are Coming to the Canyon)" (featuring Susanna Hoffs, Chris Stills and Sheryl Crow)	John E.A. Phillips	3:42
4.	"Down in the Willow Garden" (featuring Brandi Carlile)	Charlie Monroe	3:05
5.	"Shenandoah"	Traditional	3:17
6.	"Nacht und Träume"	Franz Schubert; Matthäus von Collin	2:41
7.	"Harvest" (featuring Andrew Bird and Chris Stills)	Neil Young	3:03
8.	"Going to a Town" (featuring Anohni)	Rufus Wainwright	4:16
9.	"High on a Rocky Ledge" (featuring David Byrne)	Louis Hardin	4:25
10.	"Kaulana Nā Pua" (featuring Nicole Scherzinger)	Ellen Keho'ohiwaokalani Wright Prendergast	3:37
11.	"Hush Little Baby" (featuring Martha Wainwright and Lucy Wainwright Roche)	Traditional	3:54
12.	"Black Gold" (featuring Van Dyke Parks)	Van Dyke Parks	4:40
13.	"Cotton Eyed Joe" (featuring Chaka Khan)	Traditional	3:15
14.	"Arthur McBride"	Traditional	7:33
15.	"Wild Mountain Thyme" (featuring Anna McGarrigle, Chaim Tannenbaum, Lily Lanken, Lucy Wainwright Roche, and Martha Wainwright)	Traditional	5:46
Total length:			60:55

== Personnel ==
Musicians

- Rufus Wainwright – vocals (all tracks), guitar (track 11), piano (14)
- Madison Cunningham – guitar (1, 2, 4, 7, 10, 11)
- David Piltch – bass (2–5, 7, 8, 10, 11)
- Rob Moose – arrangement, strings (2, 8)
- Patrick Sauber – banjo (2)
- Val McCallum – guitar (3, 5, 8)
- Mitchell Froom – harpsichord, Mellotron (3); piano (5, 6), electric piano (8)
- Pete Thomas – drums (3)
- Steve Amedée – tambourine (3)
- Patrick Warren – organ (5)
- Greg Leisz – lap steel guitar (7, 10), guitar (10), mandolin (11)
- Andrew Bird – violin (7)
- Jacob Mann – piano (8, 13)
- Blake Mills – guitar (9)
- Ted Poor – percussion (10)
- Van Dyke Parks – accordion, piano (12)
- Richard Parks – mandolin (12)
- Anna McGarrigle – accordion (15)
- Chaim Tannenbaum – banjo (15)

Technical

- Mitchell Froom – production
- Bob Ludwig – mastering
- David Boucher – mixing, engineering

== Charts ==
Chart performance for Folkocracy
Chart (2023)	Peak position
Scottish Albums (Official Charts)	18
UK Album Downloads (Official Charts)	23
UK Independent Albums (Official Charts)	8
UK Americana Albums (Official Charts)	3
US Top Album Sales (Billboard)	63
