= Patrick Doyle =

Scottish film composer (born 1953)

Patrick Doyle CBE
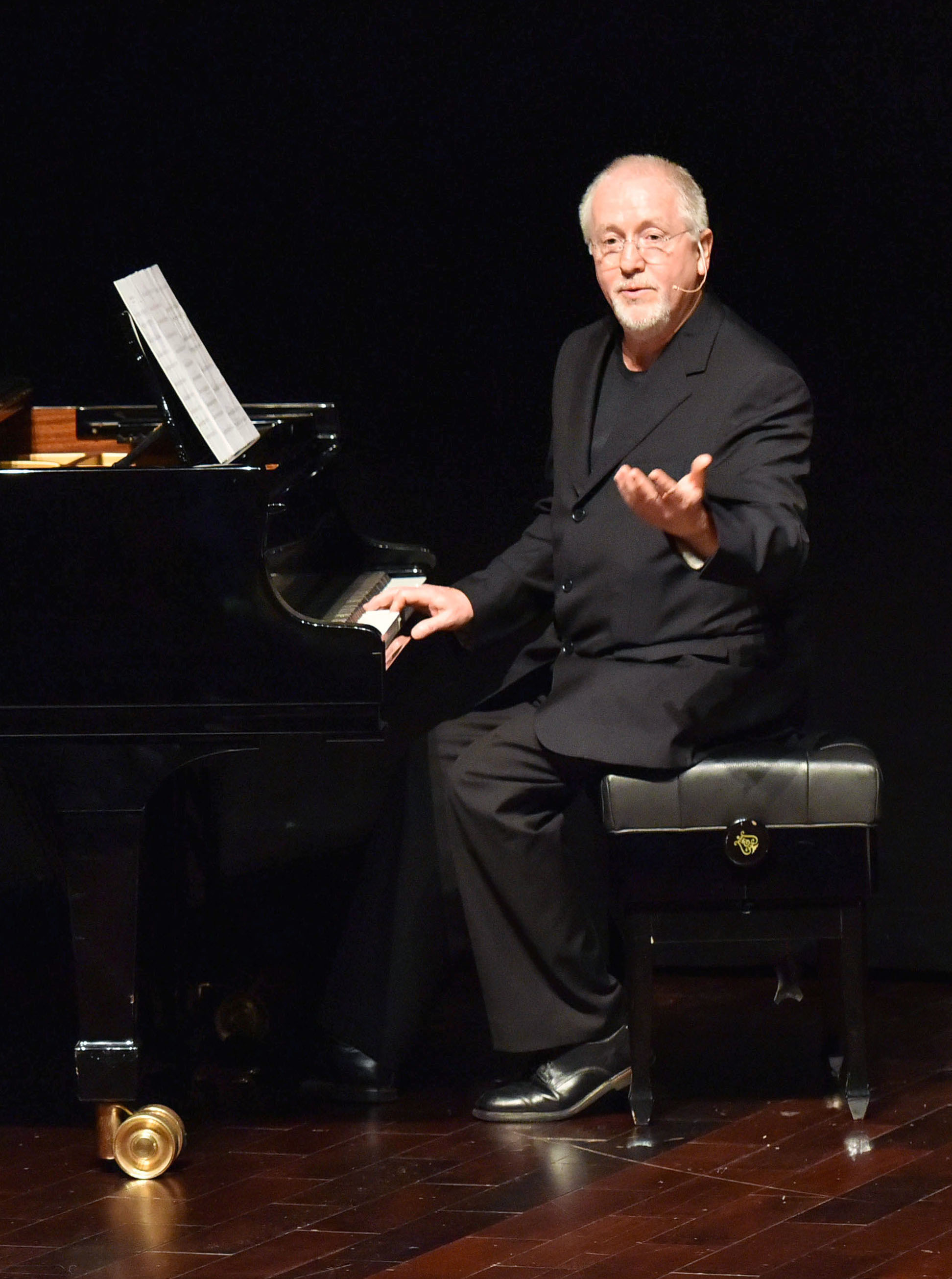
- Doyle at the Doha Film Institute in 2016

Background information
- Born: 6 April 1953 (age 73); Uddingston, Lanarkshire, Scotland
- Genres: Film score, classical, Celtic, electronic, ambient
- Occupations: Composer, actor
- Years active: 1979–present

Patrick Doyle CBE (born 6 April 1953) is a Scottish composer and occasional actor best known for his film scores. During his 50-year career in film, television and theatre, he has composed the scores for over 60 feature films. A longtime collaborator of actor-director Kenneth Branagh, Doyle is known for his work on films such as Henry V, Sense and Sensibility, Hamlet, Carlito's Way, Quest for Camelot, and Gosford Park, as well as Harry Potter and the Goblet of Fire, Rise of the Planet of the Apes, Thor, Brave, Cinderella, Murder on the Orient Express and Death on the Nile.

He has scored the films of many renowned directors including Tony Leondis, Robert Altman, Ang Lee, Alfonso Cuarón, Mike Newell, Brian De Palma, Chen Kaige, Amma Asante, Régis Wargnier and Kenneth Branagh.

Doyle has been nominated for two Academy Awards and two Golden Globe Awards, one BAFTA and two Caesars and he won the Ivor Novello Award for Best Film Theme, for 'Henry V'. He has been awarded the Lifetime Achievement Award from both The World Soundtrack Awards and Scottish BAFTA, the PRS Award for Extraordinary Achievement in Music and received the ASCAP Henry Mancini Award for "outstanding achievements and contributions to the world of film and television music."

== Life and career ==
=== Early life ===
Patrick Doyle was born in Uddingston, South Lanarkshire, Scotland. He is a classically trained composer who studied at the Royal Scottish Academy of Music graduating in 1975, and from which he was made a Fellow in 2001.

=== Film and television career ===
Patrick Doyle began his career as an actor in the mid-1970s, appearing in television as well as film. His first television acting role was as Archie in a 1978 episode of the BBC teen drama series Scene. In 1981, he played the role of Jimmie in the BAFTA and Academy Award winning historical sports drama film Chariots of Fire. The same year, he appeared in a prominent role as Alexander Smith in the Scottish television drama programme Maggie, which ran for two series on BBC Two. From 1982 until 1983, he played the role of Percy Simmonds/Alec Simmonds in the ITV children's television series No. 73. Other roles include Balthazar in the 1993 romantic comedy film Much Ado About Nothing, and Amiens in the 2006 romantic drama film As You Like It, both adapted from plays by William Shakespeare and directed by Kenneth Branagh.

Doyle joined Kenneth Branagh's Renaissance Theatre Company in 1987 as composer and musical director, composing music for plays such as Hamlet, As You Like It, and Look Back in Anger. It was here that he established his relationship with Kenneth Branagh, scoring his first film, Henry V, in 1989 with the score being conducted by Sir Simon Rattle. The song "Non Nobis, Domine" from Henry V won the 1989 Ivor Novello Award for Best Film Theme. He has since composed for 14 more Branagh films, including Dead Again (1991), Much Ado About Nothing (1993), Mary Shelley's Frankenstein (1994), Sense and Sensibility (1995), Hamlet (1996), Love's Labour's Lost (2000), As You Like It (2006), Sleuth (2007), Thor (2011), Jack Ryan: Shadow Recruit (2014), Cinderella (2015), Murder on the Orient Express (2017), Artemis Fowl (2020) and Death on the Nile (2022).

In October 1997, shortly after composing for Great Expectations, directed by Alfonso Cuarón, Doyle was diagnosed with leukemia. He managed to write the entire score for the animated fantasy Quest for Camelot (1998) in hospital whilst undergoing treatment, and eventually made a full recovery.

Other films he scored in the 1990s have become cult gangster classics, such as Brian De Palma's Carlito’s Way (1993) and Mike Newell's Donnie Brasco (1997).

In the 2000s, Doyle composed for iconic British movies such as Bridget Jones' Diary (2001), Gosford Park (2001) and Calendar Girls (2003).

He collaborated with Mike Newell again on Harry Potter and the Goblet of Fire in 2005.

In the 2010s, he wrote scores for Hollywood blockbusters including Thor (2011), Rise of the Planet of the Apes (2011) and Cinderella (2015).

Other notable work includes his scores for family movies such as Brave (2012), Nanny McPhee (2005) and A Little Princess (1995).

He has scored multiple films for celebrated French director Régis Wargnier, including Indochine (1992), Une femme française (1995) and Est-ouest (1999). His scores for Indochine and Est-ouest were nominated for a César Award for Best Music Written for a Film.

=== Artist collaborations ===
Doyle regularly collaborates with artists from other fields in his scores. From the classical music world, Plácido Domingo sang "In Pace" on Hamlet and Jane Eaglen sang "Weep You No More Sad Fountains" on Sense & Sensibility, with both films earning Doyle Oscar nominations for Best Film Score.

Pop artists Doyle has collaborated with include Jarvis Cocker on Harry Potter and the Goblet of Fire, as well as Pulp and Tori Amos on Great Expectations. He co-wrote "I find your love" with Nashville-based singer Beth Neilsen Chapman for Calendar Girls, and co-wrote the song "Never Forget" with Kenneth Branagh for Murder on the Orient Express, which was performed by Michelle Pfeiffer.

=== Concert works and original commissions ===
Doyle's Music from the Movies concert, in aid of Leukaemia Research UK, was staged at the Royal Albert Hall in 2007. Directed by Kenneth Branagh and written by Daniel Hill, it included appearances from Emma Thompson, Sir Derek Jacobi, Dame Judi Dench, Alan Rickman, Imelda Staunton, Richard E. Grant, Adrian Lester, and Robbie Coltrane, with music from Doyle's scores performed by the London Symphony Orchestra.

Doyle's work was celebrated in two concerts at the Celtic Connections festival in Glasgow in 2019, both performed by the BBC Scottish Symphony Orchestra and conducted by Dirk Brossé. The first concert was the world's first live performance to film of the music Doyle composed for Pixar's Brave, which took place at the Glasgow Concert Hall. The second, "Patrick Doyle – A Celebration", took place at the Glasgow City Halls and featured two original works composed by Doyle for the concert: "Sweet Rois of Vertew" and "Scottish Overture". The concert also featured a performance of "Corarsik", a solo violin piece he originally composed for Emma Thompson's 50th birthday.

Doyle has composed numerous concert pieces, including "The Thistle and the Rose," a song cycle commissioned by Prince Charles in honour of the Queen Mother's 90th birthday, produced by George Martin and premiered at Buckingham Palace; "The Face in the Lake", commissioned by Sony and narrated by Kate Winslet; and "Tam O Shanter," commissioned by the Scottish Schools Orchestra Trust.

The Syracuse International Film Festival commissioned Doyle to write a film score for the classic silent movie ‘It’ in 2012. In 2015 it was subsequently performed by members of both the Royal Conservatoire of Scotland Junior Orchestra as well as Lanarkshire's Arts and Film Orchestra, as part of pioneering music education initiatives which Doyle supports.

Several French film festivals have hosted Doyle as their guest of honour, including Festival international du film d'Aubagne, where Cinderella was screened; Festival International Musique et Cinéma à Auxerre Congrexpo; and the 1er Salon du Cinema.

In 2023, Doyle was asked to compose the Coronation March for the coronation of Charles III and Camilla. His composition, King Charles III Coronation March, was performed during the Commonwealth Processions.

=== Recorded works ===
In 2013, Doyle composed an original concert suite, Impressions of America, released by Varèse Sarabande. It was performed in 2012 by the National Schools Symphony Orchestra, of which Doyle is a patron.

Doyle recorded a solo piano album in 2015, performing pieces from his film scores; it was released by Varèse Sarabande.

In 2020, Doyle contributed the opening track "Château Ferguson" of the album Fresh Air… Breathe In, in aid of the not-for-profit organisation Breathe Arts Health Research, in response to the COVID-19 pandemic.

In 2022, Doyle released a recorded album entitled Robert Burns – Love Songs for Solo Piano in which he performs a newly arranged collection of works penned by Scotland's world-famous National Baird.

=== Awards and honours ===
In June 2013, at the 28th annual Film & Television Music Awards, Doyle received the ASCAP Henry Mancini Award in recognition of his "outstanding achievements and contributions to the world of film and television music". ASCAP President and Chairman Paul Williams observed, "Patrick Doyle's extensive body of work is some of the most compelling and affective in the industry. His flawless ability to cross genres in film, TV and beyond is why he can successfully score everything from Carlito's Way to Harry Potter and the Goblet of Fire."

In October 2015, Doyle received the Lifetime Achievement Award from the World Soundtrack Academy during the Gent Film Festival in Belgium.

In 2018 Doyle received an Honorary Doctorate from the University of the West of Scotland.

In June 2026, Doyle was awarded a CBE in the King's Birthday Honours for services to film.

=== Personal life ===
Doyle lives with his wife Lesley, with whom he has four children.

== Filmography ==
Year	Title	Director	Notes
1978	Scene	Robert Behrens	TV series, as actor (Archie)
1979	Charles Endell Esquire	Gerry Mill	TV series, as actor (Andy)
1981	Holding the Fort	Derrick Goodwin	TV series, as actor (Andy)
1981	Chariots of Fire	Hugh Hudson	as actor (Jimmie)
1981	Maggie	Renny Rye	TV series, as actor (as Alexander Smith)
1982	No. 73	Nigel Pickard	TV series, as actor (as Alec Simmons/Percy Simmons)
1988	Twelfth Night	Paul Kafno	Videotaped TV drama
1989	Look Back in Anger	Judi Dench	Videotaped TV drama
1989	Henry V	Kenneth Branagh	Ivor Novello Award for Best Film Theme
1990	Shipwrecked	Nils Gaup	
1991	Dead Again	Kenneth Branagh	Nominated – Golden Globe Award for Best Original Score
1992	Indochine	Régis Wargnier	Nominated – César Award for Best Music Written for a Film
1992	Into the West	Mike Newell	
1993	Much Ado About Nothing	Kenneth Branagh	also as Balthazar, Don Pedro's musician
1993	Needful Things	Fraser C. Heston	
1993	Carlito's Way	Brian De Palma	
1994	Mary Shelley's Frankenstein	Kenneth Branagh	Nominated – Saturn Award for Best Music
1994	Exit to Eden	Garry Marshall	
1995	Une femme française	Régis Wargnier	
1995	A Little Princess	Alfonso Cuarón	Los Angeles Film Critics Association Award for Best Music
1995	Sense and Sensibility	Ang Lee	Nominated – Academy Award for Best Original Score; Nominated – BAFTA Award for Best Film Music; Nominated – Golden Globe Award for Best Original Score
1996	Mrs. Winterbourne	Richard Benjamin	
1996	Hamlet	Kenneth Branagh	Nominated – Academy Award for Best Original Score; Nominated – Satellite Award for Best Original Score
1997	Donnie Brasco	Mike Newell	
1998	Great Expectations	Alfonso Cuarón	
1998	Quest for Camelot	Frederik Du Chau	First score for an animated film
1999	East/West	Régis Wargnier	Nominated – César Award for Best Music Written for a Film
2000	Love's Labour's Lost	Kenneth Branagh	
2001	Blow Dry	Paddy Breathnach	
2001	Bridget Jones's Diary	Sharon Maguire	World Soundtrack Award for Best Original Score of the Year Not Released on an Album
2001	Gosford Park	Robert Altman	World Soundtrack Award for Soundtrack Composer of the Year
2002	Killing Me Softly	Chen Kaige	
2003	Calendar Girls	Nigel Cole	
2003	Secondhand Lions	Tim McCanlies	
2003	The Galíndez File	Gerardo Herrero	
2004	Battle of the Brave (Nouvelle-France)	Jean Beaudin	
2005	Man to Man	Régis Wargnier	
2005	Wah-Wah	Richard E. Grant	
2005	Nanny McPhee	Kirk Jones	
2005	Harry Potter and the Goblet of Fire	Mike Newell	Theme by John Williams; ASCAP Award for Top Box Office Films; Nominated – Saturn Award for Best Music
2006	Jekyll & Hyde	Nick Stillwell	
2006	As You Like It	Kenneth Branagh	
2006	Eragon	Stefen Fangmeier	
2007	Have Mercy on Us All	Régis Wargnier	
2007	The Last Legion	Doug Lefler	
2007	Sleuth	Kenneth Branagh	
2008	Nim's Island	Jennifer Flackett; Mark Levin	
2008	Igor	Tony Leondis	
2010	Main Street	John Doyle	
2011	La Ligne droite	Régis Wargnier	Nominated – World Soundtrack Award for Soundtrack Composer of the Year
2011	Thor	Kenneth Branagh	Nominated – World Soundtrack Award for Soundtrack Composer of the Year
2011	Jig	Sue Bourne	Documentary; Nominated – World Soundtrack Award for Soundtrack Composer of the Year
2011	Sarajevo	—N/a	Short film
2011	Rise of the Planet of the Apes	Rupert Wyatt	
2012	Brave	Mark Andrews; Brenda Chapman	Also voice of Martin
2012	Sir Billi	Sascha Hartmann	Also voice of The Admiral
2013	It	Clarence G. Badger	Silent movie from 1927
2013	Puppeteer	Gavin Moore	Video game
2014	Jack Ryan: Shadow Recruit	Kenneth Branagh	
2014	Effie Gray	Richard Laxton	as actor (Wedding Minister)
2015	Cinderella		
2016	A United Kingdom	Amma Asante	
2016	Whisky Galore!	Gillies MacKinnon	
2017	The Emoji Movie	Tony Leondis	
2017	Murder on the Orient Express	Kenneth Branagh	
2018	Sgt. Stubby: An American Hero	Richard Lanni	
2018	All Is True	Kenneth Branagh	
2020	Artemis Fowl	Kenneth Branagh	
2022	Death on the Nile	Kenneth Branagh	

== Awards and nominations ==
Award	Year	Project	Category	Result
Academy Award	1995	Sense and Sensibility	Best Original Score	Nominated
Academy Award	1996	Hamlet	Best Original Score	Nominated
ASCAP Film and Television Music Awards	2006	Harry Potter and the Goblet of Fire	Top Box Office Films	Won
ASCAP Film and Television Music Awards	2012	Rise of the Planet of the Apes	Top Box Office Films	Won
ASCAP Film and Television Music Awards	2012	Thor	Top Box Office Films	Won
ASCAP Film and Television Music Awards	2013	Brave	Top Box Office Films	Won
ASCAP Film and Television Music Awards	2013		Henry Mancini Award	Won
BAFTA Award	1995	Sense and Sensibility	Best Film Music	Nominated
César Awards	1993	Indochine	Best Music	Nominated
César Awards	2000	Est-Ouest	Best Music	Nominated
D.I.C.E. Awards	2014	Puppeteer	Outstanding Achievement in Original Music Composition	Nominated
Golden Globe Awards	1991	Dead Again	Best Original Score	Nominated
Golden Globe Awards	1995	Sense and Sensibility	Best Original Score	Nominated
Ivor Novello Awards	1989	Henry V	Best Film Theme	Won
Los Angeles Film Critics Association Awards	1995	A Little Princess	Best Music	Won
Satellite Award	1996	Hamlet	Best Original Score	Nominated
Saturn Awards	1994	Frankenstein	Best Music	Nominated
Saturn Awards	2005	Harry Potter and the Goblet of Fire	Best Music	Nominated
World Soundtrack Awards	2001	Bridget Jones's Diary	Best Original Score of the Year Not Released on an Album	Won
World Soundtrack Awards	2002	Gosford Park	Soundtrack Composer of the Year	Won
World Soundtrack Awards	2006	Harry Potter and the Goblet of Fire	Best Original Song Written for Film ("Magic Works")	Nominated
World Soundtrack Awards	2011	La ligne droite, Thor, Jig	Soundtrack Composer of the Year	Nominated
World Soundtrack Awards	2015	Cinderella	Best Original Film Score of the Year	Nominated
World Soundtrack Awards	2015		Lifetime Achievement Award	Won

== See also ==
- Harry Potter music
