= The One You Love (Rufus Wainwright song) =

Single by Rufus Wainwright

from the album Want Two
- Released: February 28, 2005 (UK)
- Genre: Baroque pop
- Length: 3:44
- Label: Geffen
- Songwriter(s): Rufus Wainwright
- Producer(s): Marius de Vries

Rufus Wainwright singles chronology
"Oh What a World" (2004)	"The One You Love" (2005)	"Crumb by Crumb" (2005)

"The One You Love" is a song written and performed by Canadian-American singer-songwriter Rufus Wainwright. It served as the first single from Wainwright's fourth studio album, Want Two, and was released digitally in the UK on February 28, 2005. Promotional singles distributed to radio stations contained both the album version and a radio edit.

The song failed to chart in any country.

== Track listing ==
=== UK digital single ===
1. "The One You Love"

== Personnel ==
- Rufus Wainwright – voice, piano, additional vocals, acoustic guitar
- Marius de Vries – programming
- Martha Wainwright – additional vocals
- Gerry Leonard – electric guitar
- Charlie Sexton – electric guitar
- Jeff Hill – bass
- Levon Helm – drums
- Alexis Smith – programming

== Music video ==
The music video for "The One You Love" was directed by George Scott, and features footage from Montreal, London, Cambridge, Brighton and New York City. The video was used to promote the single in the UK, and also appears on Wainwright's music DVD, All I Want.
