= Oh What a World (song) =

Single by Rufus Wainwright

from the album Want One
- Released: 2004
- Genre: Baroque pop
- Length: 4:23
- Label: DreamWorks
- Songwriter(s): Rufus Wainwright
- Producer(s): Marius de Vries

Rufus Wainwright singles chronology
"I Don't Know What It Is" (2004)	"Oh What a World" (2004)	"The One You Love" (2005)

"Oh What a World" is a song written and performed by Canadian-American singer-songwriter Rufus Wainwright. It was released as the second single from Wainwright's third studio album, Want One (2003), released digitally via iTunes and 7digital in the United Kingdom on November 8, 2004. Promotional copies were also distributed to radio stations in an attempt to increase awareness of the song and album. The song includes several arrangements from Maurice Ravel's Boléro.

"Oh What a World" also appears on Rufus Wainwright: Live at the Fillmore, the bonus DVD that accompanies Want Two (2004), the repackaged double album released in the UK simply titled Want, and the 2005 compilation album Acoustic 05.

The song contains an interpolation of Maurice Ravel's Boléro, which premiered in 1928.

== Track listing ==
UK digital single

1. "Oh What a World"

UK promotional CD

1. "Oh What a World" (album version)
2. "Oh What a World" (radio edit)

== Personnel ==
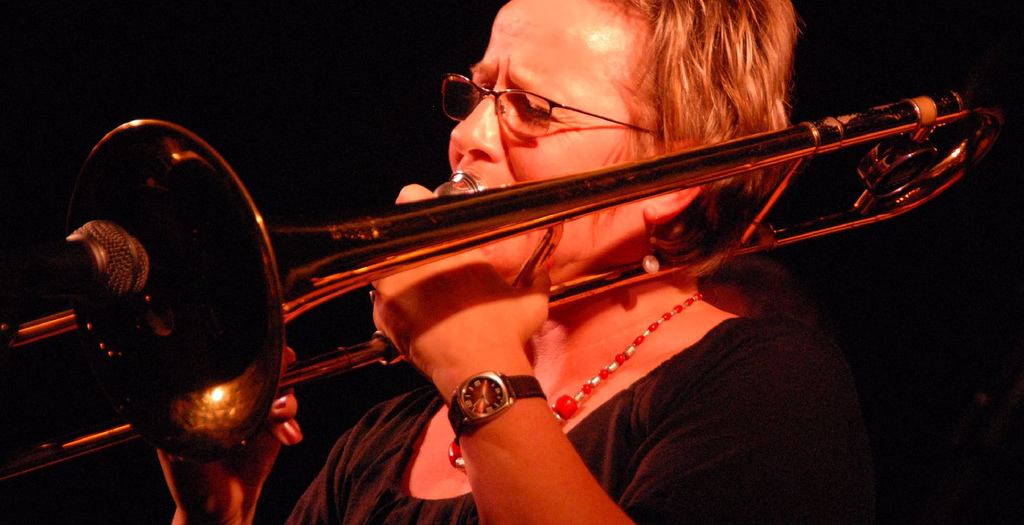
Annie Whitehead

- Rufus Wainwright – voice, orchestral arrangements
- Marius de Vries – piano, programming, orchestral arrangements
- Joy Smith – harp
- Nick Hitchens – tuba
- Isobel Griffiths – orchestra contractor
- Gavyn Wright – orchestra leader
- Alexis Smith – programming
- Simon C Clarke – alto sax, baritone sax, flute, alto flute, piccolo
- Tim Sanders – tenor sax
- Roddy Lorimer – trumpet
- Paul Spong – trumpet
- Annie Whitehead – trombone
- Dave Stewart – bass trombone
- Maxim Moston – orchestral arrangements
- Chris Elliott – orchestral arrangements

== Television performances ==
- The Frank Skinner Show - November 4, 2004

== Live performances ==
- Nobel Banquet - December 10, 2022
