= I Don't Know What It Is =

Single by Rufus Wainwright

from the album Want One
- Released: 2004
- Genre: Baroque pop
- Length: 4:51
- Label: DreamWorks Records
- Songwriter(s): Rufus Wainwright
- Producer(s): Marius de Vries

Rufus Wainwright singles chronology
"I Don't Know What It Is" (2004)	"Oh What a World" (2004)

"I Don't Know What It Is" is a single by Canadian-American singer-songwriter Rufus Wainwright, released in a slim-line jewel case format in 2004. It is from his third studio album Want One (2003). In addition to the UK and Japanese versions of Want One, the song also appears on the bonus DVD that accompanies Want Two (Rufus Wainwright: Live at the Fillmore), All I Want (DVD), and Want, a repackaged UK double album that contains Want One and Want Two.

== Composition ==
In All I Want, producer Marius de Vries admitted that "I Don't Know What It Is" was one of the most complex production challenges he had ever faced, with its hundreds of layers of separate orchestral, choral, and vocal parts. Between "running around" and "chugging along" "on a train going God knows where to" in a sort of aimless wander, transportation is a major theme of the song. Wainwright alludes to several locations, from precise ones such as Calais, Dover, Poland and Lower Manhattan to more abstract locales like Heaven, Hell, and Limbo. Wainwright said of the song:

"When I first came up with the lines, I don't know what it is, but you got to do it/ I don't know where to go but you got to be there, I was at this party for The Strokes in New York. There was this prevailing sense of, 'We're not quite sure what's happening or what is cool, but we know that it's somewhere around here, in this room.' It was this vague confusion, with everybody kind of sniffing for blood. It wasn't that it was a bad party, or that I don't like The Strokes; I just think there's a lot of confusion right now in the music business. Then, later on, I realized the song was really personal. I didn't know where I was, and I didn't know I was actually lost. It wasn't about the party at all; it's about searching but not knowing what you're searching for. There's the train motif, being on this train heading for either oblivion or salvation and just holding on for dear life. That song came down from some mountain somewhere, because it was right after I wrote it that I sort of packed it in."

— Rufus Wainwright, rufuswainwright.com Biography

References are also made to the American sitcom Three's Company; "knock on the door", "take a step that is new", and "three's company" all allude to the TV show's theme song. "Taking the Santa Fe and the Atchison, Topeka" is a reference to Judy Garland's The Harvey Girls, which itself contains an allusion to the Atchison, Topeka and Santa Fe Railway.

== Promotion ==
Wainwright performed the song on Late Show with David Letterman on October 6, 2003.

== Track listing ==
1. "I Don't Know What It Is"
2. "L'Absence" (from Hector Berlioz's Les nuits d'été, op. 7)
3. "14th Street"

Both B-sides were recorded live at The Fillmore in San Francisco in March 2004.

== Chart performance ==
"I Don't Know What It Is" appeared on the UK Singles Chart for one week, entering on August 7, 2004, and reaching a peak chart position at No. 74.

Chart	Peak
UK Singles Chart	74

== Personnel ==
- Rufus Wainwright – voice, piano, orchestral arrangements
- Marius de Vries – programming, orchestral arrangements
- Joy Smith – harp
- Isobel Griffiths – orchestra contractor
- Gavyn Wright – orchestra leader
- Alexis Smith – programming
- Simon C Clarke – flute
- Roddy Lorimer – trumpet
- Paul Spong – trumpet
- Annie Whitehead – trombone
- Dave Stewart – bass trombone
- Sterling Campbell – drums
- Jeff Hill – bass
- Gerry Leonard – guitar
- Charlie Sexton – guitar
- Jimmy Zhivago – guitar
- Alexandra Knoll – oboe
- David Sapadin – clarinet
- Daniel Shelly – bassoon
- Maxim Moston – orchestral arrangements
- Chris Elliott – orchestral arrangements
