= World Soundtrack Award for Most Creative Use of Existing Material on a Soundtrack =

Belgian music award

The award for Most Creative Use of Existing Material on a Soundtrack was an award for the World Soundtrack Awards. It was awarded only in the first year of the World Soundtrack Awards, in 2001. There were no other nominees, just a winner.

== Winners ==
- 2001: Moulin Rouge! - Baz Luhrmann, Craig Armstrong & Marius de Vries
