= Technopera / Solitude of Heart / Do It to the Music =

EP by Ampersounds and Rufus Wainwright
- Released: July 16, 2021
- Label: West End Records

Technopera / Solitude of Heart / Do It to the Music is the debut extended play (EP) by Ampersounds (Fred Falke and Zen Freeman), featuring Rufus Wainwright, released via West End Records and BMG Records on July 16, 2021.

== Composition ==
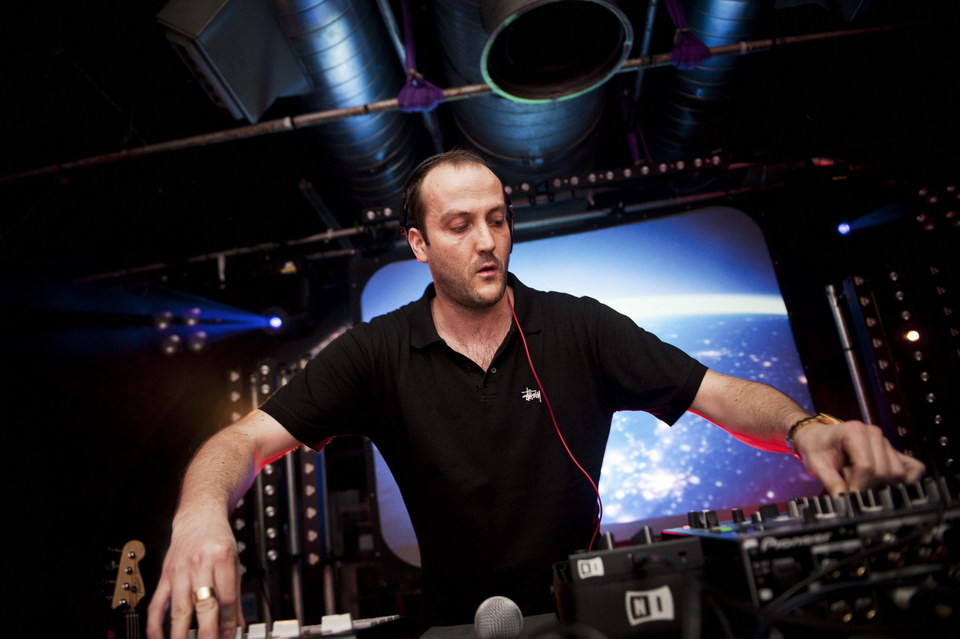
Fred Falke in 2012

Wainwright provides guest vocals on "Technopera" and "Solitude of Heart". The EP also features a remix of Raw Silk's "Do It to the Music" (1982).

== Promotion and release history ==
"Technopera" was released on June 2, 2021. The music videos for "Technopera" and "Solitude of Heart" were directed by Cédric Hervet and Sean Augustine, respectively.

The EP is slated for vinyl release on November 12, 2021.

== Track listing ==
1. "Technopera", feat. Rufus Wainwright
2. "Solitude of Heart", feat. Rufus Wainwright
3. "Do It to the Music" [2012 Club Mix Remaster]
4. "Do It to the Music" [Fred Falke x Zen Freeman Remix]

Track listing adapted from the Apple Store
