= Main Street (2010 film) =

- Theatrical release poster
- Directed by: John Doyle
- Written by: Horton Foote
- Produced by: Adi Shankar; Megan Ellison; Jonah Hirsch; Spencer Silna
- Starring: Orlando Bloom; Colin Firth; Andrew McCarthy; Ellen Burstyn; Amber Tamblyn; Patricia Clarkson
- Cinematography: Donald McAlpine
- Edited by: Richard Francis-Bruce
- Music by: Patrick Doyle
- Production company: 1984 Films
- Distributed by: Magnolia Pictures; Myriad Pictures (International)
- Release dates: October 21, 2010 (Austin Film Festival); September 9, 2011 (United States)
- Country: United States
- Language: English
- Box office: $2,560

Main Street is a 2010 American drama film about several residents of Durham, North Carolina, a city in the Southern U.S., whose lives are changed by the arrival of a stranger with a controversial plan to save their decaying hometown.

== Plot ==
Each of the colorful citizens of a close-knit North Carolina community—from a once-wealthy tobacco heiress to the city's mayor to a local police officer—will search for ways to reinvent themselves, their relationships and the very heart of their neighborhood.

== Cast ==
- Colin Firth as Gus Leroy
- Ellen Burstyn as Georgiana Carr
- Patricia Clarkson as Willa Jenkins
- Orlando Bloom as Harris Parker
- Amber Tamblyn as Mary Saunders
- Margo Martindale as Myrtle Parker
- Andrew McCarthy as Howard Mercer
- Victoria Clark as Miriam
- Isiah Whitlock Jr. as Mayor
- Tom Wopat as Frank
- Viktor Hernandez as Estaquio
- Juan Piedrahita as Jose (as Juan Carlos Piedrahita)
- Thomas Upchurch as Trooper Williams
- Dennis Regling as Robert Dunning
- Reid Dalton as Crosby Gage
- Amy da Luz as Rita

== Production ==
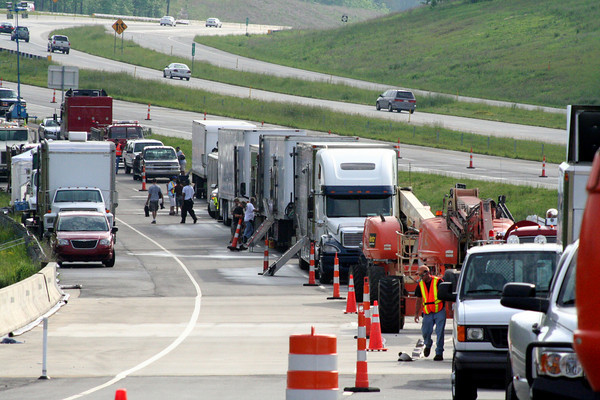
Filming an action sequence on NC-540 near Durham, NC

The film was shot nearly entirely in Durham, North Carolina in April and May 2009. The screenplay was written by Pulitzer Prize–winning writer Horton Foote after he found downtown Durham empty on a weekend visit several years earlier.

Myriad Pictures bought the international distribution rights in May 2009. The film was promoted at the 2009 Cannes Film Festival by its producers and stars.

== Reception ==
Reception for the film has been generally negative. On review aggregation website Rotten Tomatoes, the film has a 14% approval rating based on reviews from seven critics, with an average score of 4.7/10.

Blog Critics reviewed the film, saying, "Everything that occurs in the film feels shallow somehow, and it’s a shame because Main Street had all of the basic elements that would have made it truly, a great film."
