= Tiergarten (EP) =

EP by Rufus Wainwright
- Released: October 29, 2007 (UK)
- Genre: Pop
- Label: Geffen

Rufus Wainwright chronology
Release the Stars (2007)	Tiergarten (EP) (2007)	Rufus Does Judy at Carnegie Hall (2007)

Tiergarten is a digital extended play (EP) recording by Rufus Wainwright, released under Geffen Records in the United Kingdom on October 29, 2007. The EP contains one track: "Supermayer Lost in Tiergarten." This track, a remix of "Tiergarten" from Wainwright's album Release the Stars, was also featured as a single in limited vinyl release (500 copies total).

== Track listing ==
1. "Supermayer Lost in Tiergarten"
