= Rufus! Rufus! Rufus! Does Judy! Judy! Judy!: Live from the London Palladium =

Video by Rufus Wainwright
- Released: December 3, 2007
- Recorded: February 25, 2007, at the London Palladium in London
- Genre: Pop
- Label: Geffen

Rufus! Rufus! Rufus! Does Judy! Judy! Judy!: Live from the London Palladium is a DVD by the Canadian-American singer-songwriter Rufus Wainwright, released under Geffen Records in December 2007. The film consists of live recordings from his sold-out February 25, 2007, tribute concert at the London Palladium to the legendary American actress and singer Judy Garland. The DVD complements the release of Wainwright's Grammy Award-nominated double album, Rufus Does Judy at Carnegie Hall, which contains the same songs from Garland's well-known 1961 album, Judy at Carnegie Hall. The DVD also includes several songs not included on Wainwright's album release.

Guests on the DVD include Martha Wainwright ("Stormy Weather", "Someone to Watch Over Me"), one of Garland's daughters, Lorna Luft ("After You've Gone", "Hello Bluebird"), along with Kate McGarrigle (piano—"Over the Rainbow" and "Ev'ry Time We Say Goodbye").

== Tribute concerts ==
Due to popular demand, Wainwright's tribute was performed a total of six times. After tickets for the first show (June 14, 2006, at Carnegie Hall in New York City) sold out, a second show was added at the same venue for the following night (June 15). Increased demand resulted in three concerts in Europe: February 18, 2007, at the London Palladium in London, February 20 at L'Olympia in Paris, and February 25 once again at the London Palladium. The final performance was on September 23, 2007, at the Hollywood Bowl in Los Angeles, California.

== Track listing ==
1. Overture: "The Trolley Song" / "Over the Rainbow" / "The Man That Got Away"
  (Ralph Blane, Hugh Martin) / (Harold Arlen, Yip Harburg) / (Arlen, Ira Gershwin) – 5:26
2. "When You're Smiling (The Whole World Smiles With You)" (Mark Fisher, Joe Goodwin, Larry Shay) – 3:37
3. Medley: "Almost Like Being in Love" / "This Can't Be Love"
  (Alan Jay Lerner, Frederick Loewe) / (Richard Rodgers, Lorenz Hart) – 6:20
4. "Do It Again" (George Gershwin, Buddy DeSylva) – 6:01
5. "You Go to My Head" (J. Fred Coots, Haven Gillespie) – 2:47
6. "Alone Together" (Howard Dietz, Arthur Schwartz) – 3:57
7. "Who Cares? (As Long as You Care for Me)" (G. Gershwin, I. Gershwin) – 1:44
8. "Puttin' on the Ritz" (Irving Berlin) – 1:52
9. "How Long Has This Been Going On?" (G. Gershwin, I. Gershwin) – 4:56
10. "Just You, Just Me" (Jesse Greer, Raymond Klages) – 1:21
11. "The Man That Got Away" (Arlen, I. Gershwin) – 4:28
12. "San Francisco" (Walter Jurmann, Gus Kahn, Bronislaw Kaper) – 4:58
13. "That's Entertainment!" (Dietz, Schwartz) – 4:20
14. "I Can't Give You Anything But Love" (Dorothy Fields, Jimmy McHugh) – 7:40
15. "Come Rain or Come Shine" (Arlen, Johnny Mercer) – 4:27
16. "You're Nearer" (Rodgers, Hart) – 2:00
17. "A Foggy Day" (G. Gershwin, I. Gershwin) – 3:16
18. "If Love Were All" (Noël Coward) – 2:43
19. "Zing! Went the Strings of My Heart" – (J. F. Hanely) – 4:04
20. "Stormy Weather" (Arlen, Ted Koehler) – 5:44 (performed by Martha Wainwright)
21. Medley: "You Made Me Love You" / "For Me and My Gal" / "The Trolley Song"
  (Joseph McCarthy, James V. Monaco, Roger Edens) / (George W. Meyer, Edgar Leslie, E. Ray Goetz) / (Blane, Martin) – 4:42
22. "Rock-a-Bye Your Baby with a Dixie Melody" (Sam M. Lewis, Fred Schwartz, Joe Young) – 4:55
23. "Over the Rainbow" (Arlen, Harburg) – 4:47 – 5:02 (featuring Kate McGarrigle, piano)
24. "Swanee" (Irving Caesar, G. Gershwin) – 1:50
25. "After You've Gone" (Henry Creamer, Turner Layton) – 4:57 (duet with Lorna Luft)
26. "Chicago" (Fred Fisher) – 4:35
27. "Get Happy" (Arlen, Koehler) – 4:21
28. "Hello Bluebird" – 5:12 (performed by Lorna Luft)
29. "Someone to Watch Over Me" (G. Gershwin, I. Gershwin) – 4:21 (performed by Martha Wainwright and Kate McGarrigle)
30. "Ev'ry Time We Say Goodbye" (Cole Porter) – 3:13 (featuring Kate McGarrigle, piano)
31. "San Francisco [Reprise]" – 6:37
32. Credits – 0:52

== Personnel ==
- Frank Filipetti – mixing
- Lorna Luft – performer
- Kate McGarrigle – piano
- Stephen Oremus – conductor, director
- Barry Taylor – executive producer
- Martha Wainwright – performer
- Rufus Wainwright – performer
