= Want Two =

Studio album by Rufus Wainwright
- Released: November 16, 2004
- Recorded: Bearsville Studios, Woodstock, NYC; also London
- Genres: Baroque pop; alternative rock
- Length: 54:08
- Label: Geffen
- Producers: Marius de Vries; Rufus Wainwright

Rufus Wainwright chronology
Want One (2003)	Want Two (2004)	Release the Stars (2007)

Singles from Want Two
- 1. "The One You Love" Released: February 28, 2005 (UK)

Professional ratings
Aggregate scores
Source	Rating
Metacritic	78/100
Review scores
Source	Rating
AllMusic	4/5 stars
Entertainment Weekly	B
The Guardian	4/5 stars
Los Angeles Times	4/4 stars
NME	9/10
Pitchfork	6.0/10
Q	4/5 stars
Rolling Stone	4/5 stars
Spin	B−
The Village Voice	B−

Want Two is the fourth album by American-Canadian singer-songwriter Rufus Wainwright. The album was released on November 16, 2004. Four of the tracks on this album were released in the summer of 2004 as the EP Waiting for a Want on the iTunes music store.

Want Two is, according to Wainwright, the darker sibling of 2003's Want One – its subject matter concerned with "the world we live in" (RW Geffen Bio) after Want One's focus on the intensely personal. The artist's song selections here show his range to be broad, veering from romantic ballad ("Peach Trees") to tragic ballad ("This Love Affair"), sophisticated pop ("The One You Love") to third person/first person narrative lament ("The Art Teacher"), personal tongue in cheek manifesto ("Gay Messiah"), to a classical pop hybrid written about Jeff Buckley ("Memphis Skyline") and songs beyond category. "Agnus Dei" is used in the trailer for the 2007 film Trade.

Mother Kate McGarrigle and aunt Anna (McGarrigle) both perform and sing on "Hometown Waltz". Anohni of 2005 Mercury Prize winners Antony and the Johnsons sings lead vocal alongside Wainwright on "Old Whore's Diet". The initial UK version of the record contains bonus live tracks, "Coeur de Parisienne – Reprise d'Arletty" and "Quand vous mourrez de nos amours" (written by French Canadian songwriter Gilles Vigneault).

== Legacy ==
The album was also included in the book 1001 Albums You Must Hear Before You Die.

== Track listing ==
1. "Agnus Dei" – 5:45
2. "The One You Love" – 3:44
3. "Peach Trees" – 5:59
4. "Little Sister" – 3:22
5. "The Art Teacher" – 3:51
6. "Hometown Waltz" – 2:33
7. "This Love Affair" – 3:13
8. "Gay Messiah" – 3:14
9. "Memphis Skyline" – 4:51
10. "Waiting for a Dream" – 4:14
11. "Crumb by Crumb" – 4:13
12. "Old Whore's Diet" – 9:09

=== Bonus tracks ===
1. "Coeur de Parisienne — Reprise d'Arletty" (live) (UK & EU bonus track) – 2:46
2. "Quand vous mourez de nos amours" (live) (UK bonus track) – 3.23
3. "Chelsea Hotel, No. 2" (live) (bonus track on Want) – 3:47
4. "In with the Ladies" (bonus track on Want) – 3:52

=== Live at the Fillmore DVD ===
1. "DVD Intro" – 1:26
2. "L'Absence" – 4:00
3. "14th Street" – 4:33
4. "Harvester of Hearts" – 3:41
5. "Natasha" – 3:24
6. "The Art Teacher" – 3:34
7. "Hallelujah" – 4:22
8. "Matinee Idol" – 2:58
9. "Vibrate" – 3:17
10. "Gay Messiah" – 4:17
11. "Want" – 5:27
12. "Greek Song" – 3:52
13. "Foolish Love" – 5:35
14. "I Don't Know What It Is" – 5:40
15. "Dinner at Eight" – 5:00
16. "Beautiful Child" – 6:28
17. "Oh What a World" – 4:13
18. "Liberty Cabbage" – 4:56
19. "California" – 3:28
20. "As in Happy" – 3:40
21. "DVD Credits" – 1:35

== Personnel ==
- Rufus Wainwright – voice (1–12), piano (1–7,9,10), additional vocals (2,3,8,11), acoustic guitar (2,3,8,11), keyboards (11), orchestral arrangements (1,4,7,9–11)
- Sophie Solomon – violin (1)
- Pit Hermans – cimbalom (1)
- Marius de Vries – keyboards (1,10,11), vibraphone (3,9), programming (2–4,8–11), orchestral arrangements (1,4,7,9–11)
- Isobel Griffiths – orchestra contractor (1,4,9,11), horn contractor (5,10)
- Gavyn Wright – orchestral leader (1,4,9,11)
- Martha Wainwright – additional vocals (2,3,6,8,12), violin (6)
- Gerry Leonard – electric guitar (2,3), guitars (9)
- Charlie Sexton – electric guitar (2,3)
- Jeff Hill – bass (2,3,8–12), additional vocals (12)
- Levon Helm – drums (2)
- Roberto Rodriguez – percussion (3)
- Sterling Campbell – drums (3,9)
- Matt Johnson – drums (3,8)
- Kate McGarrigle – additional vocals (6), banjo (6)
- Anna McGarrigle – additional vocals (6), accordion (6)
- Lily Lanken – additional vocals (6), recorder (6)
- Brad Albetta – bass guitar (6)
- Maxim Moston – violin (7,10,12), concertmaster (7,10), orchestral arrangements (1,4,7,9–11)
- Antoine Silverman – violin (7,10)
- Joan Wasser – violin (7,10), viola (12)
- Julianne Klopotic – violin (7,10)
- Vivienne Kim – violin (7,10)
- Fiona Murray – violin (7,10)
- Cenovia Cummins – violin (7,10)
- Christopher Cardona – violin (7,10)
- Danielle Farina – viola (7,10)
- Alison Gordon – viola (7,10)
- Eric Hammelman – viola (7,10)
- Kathryn Lockwood – viola (7,10)
- Anja Wood – cello (7,10)
- Jane Scarpantoni – cello (7,10)
- Julia Kent – cello (7,10,12)
- Carlo Pellettieri – cello (7,10)
- Troy Rinker Jr – bass guitar (7,10)
- Alexandra Knoll – oboe (7)
- David Sapadin – clarinet (7)
- Daniel Shelly – bassoon (7)
- Teddy Thompson – additional vocals (8,12)
- Jenni Muldaur – additional vocals (8)
- Suzzy Roche – additional vocals (8)
- Leona Naess – additional vocals (11)
- David Theodore – oboe (11)
- Rob Burger – Hammond organ (11)
- Gina Gershon – Jew's harp (11)
- Antony – voice (12)
- Julianna Raye – additional vocals (12)
- Roger Greenawalt – ukulele (12), banjo (12)
- Steven Wolf – djembe (12), tambourine (12), additional programming (12)
- Alexis Smith – programming (2–4,8–11)
- Van Dyke Parks – orchestral arrangements (1,4,7,9–11)
- Jack McKeever – engineer

== Chart positions ==
Chart (2004)	Peak position
French Albums (SNEP)	160
Dutch Albums (Album Top 100)	68
Portuguese Album Chart	30
UK Albums Chart	21
U.S. Billboard 200	103
Scottish Albums (Official Charts)	21

== Awards ==
Year	Nominee / work	Award	Result
2005	Want Two	GLAAD Media Award – Outstanding Music Artist	Nominated
2005	Want Two	Juno Award – Adult Alternative Album of the Year	Nominated
