= Marius de Vries =

English music producer and composer (born 1961)

- Born: 1961 (age 64–65); London, England
- Genres: Electronic; trip hop; rock
- Occupations: Record producer; composer; engineer
- Instruments: Keyboards; drum programming; guitar

Marius de Vries (born 1961) is an English record producer and composer. He has won two Grammy Awards from five nominations, two BAFTA Awards, and an Ivor Novello Award.

== Education ==
Marius de Vries was educated at St Paul's Cathedral School, Bedford School (between 1975 and 1980) and then at Peterhouse, Cambridge.

== Career ==
=== Music producer ===
Recording artists he has collaborated with include Björk, Madonna, Massive Attack, The Cranberries, David Bowie, U2, FKA twigs, Rufus Wainwright, Chrissie Hynde, Neil Finn, Annie Lennox, Bebel Gilberto, David Gray, P.J. Harvey, Elbow, Josh Groban, Alice Martineau and Melanie C.

De Vries served as the executive music producer for the 2016 film La La Land and produced the accompanying soundtrack. He also co-wrote the song "Start a Fire" alongside John Legend, Justin Hurwitz, and Angelique Cinelu, and had a small role in the film as a casting director.

=== Composer/film scores ===
De Vries was the music director of the 2001 film Moulin Rouge! and worked with Nellee Hooper on the film soundtrack of Romeo + Juliet (1996) as co-composer, programmer, and co-producer. Both of these projects won de Vries British Academy Film Awards. He was also awarded an Ivor Novello Award for his compositional work on the former.

He also wrote the scores for Stephan Elliott's surreal thriller Eye of the Beholder as well as Elliott's adaptation of the Noël Coward comedy Easy Virtue. The latter film is notable musically for using the real singing voices of leading actors Ben Barnes, Jessica Biel, and Colin Firth.

In 2010, he co-wrote the score of Kick-Ass with John Murphy, Henry Jackman and Ilan Eshkeri. He co-produced, along with Tyler Bates and Zack and Deborah Snyder, and performed on the soundtrack of Snyder's 2011 film Sucker Punch.

In 2020 and 2021, he composed the score for Sian Heder's CODA, which won Best Picture at the 2022 Academy Awards. He served as executive music producer on Leos Carax's Annette.

De Vries recently scored Daniel Roher's Navalny, which won Best Documentary at the 2023 Academy Awards. With Joshua Schmidt, he composed the score for Joshua Oppenheimer's apocalyptic musical film, The End (2024), starring Tilda Swinton.

== Partial list of songs produced ==
Songs by Teddy Thompson

- "A Piece of What You Need"
- "Can't Sing Straight"
- "Don't Know What I Was Thinking"
- "In My Arms"
- "Jonathan's Book"
- "One of These Days"
- "Slippery Slope (Easier)"
- "The Things I Do"
- "Turning The Gun on Myself"
- "What's This?!!"
- "Where to Go From Here"

Songs by Rufus Wainwright

- "11:11"
- "14th Street"
- "Agnus Dei"
- "Beautiful Child"
- "Crumb By Crumb"
- "Dinner at Eight"
- "Gay Messiah"
- "Go or Go Ahead"
- "I Don't Know What It Is"
- "Little Sister"
- "Memphis Skyline"
- "Movies of Myself"
- "Natasha"
- "Oh What a World"
- "Old Whore's Diet" (co-produced by Wainwright)
- "Peach Trees"
- "Pretty Things"
- "The Art Teacher"
- "The One You Love"
- "This Love Affair"
- "Vibrate"
- "Vicious World"
- "Waiting For a Dream"
- "Want"

== Awards and nominations ==
BAFTA Awards

Year	Recipient	Category	Result	Ref.
1998	Romeo + Juliet	Best Film Music	Won	
2002	Moulin Rouge!	Best Film Music	Won	

Grammy Awards

Year	Recipient	Category	Result	Ref.
1998	Ray of Light	Album of the Year	Nominated	
1998	Contact from the Underworld of Redboy	Best Engineered Album, Non-Classical	Nominated	
2001	Moulin Rouge!	Best Compilation Soundtrack for Visual Media	Nominated	
2017	La La Land	Best Compilation Soundtrack for Visual Media	Won	
2026	Eusexua	Best Dance/Electronic Album	Won	

Ivor Novello Awards

Year	Recipient	Category	Result	Ref.
1998	Romeo + Juliet	Best Original Film Score	Won	

World Soundtrack Awards

Year	Recipient	Category	Result	Ref.
2001	Moulin Rouge!	Best Original Score of the Year	Nominated	
2001	Moulin Rouge!	Most Creative Use of Existing Material on a Soundtrack	Won	
