= Gay Messiah =

Song by Rufus Wainwright

from the EP Waiting for a Want
- Released: 2004
- Length: 3:14
- Composer: Rufus Wainwright

"Gay Messiah" is a song written and performed by American-Canadian singer-songwriter Rufus Wainwright. It originally appeared on his EP, Waiting for a Want, released by DreamWorks Records in June 2004 as a preview of his fourth studio album, Want Two, released by Geffen Records in November 2004.

== Composition ==
"Gay Messiah" features both Christian and gay iconography, and has been described as an example of Wainwright expressing his sexuality within his work. In the song, Wainwright addresses being labeled a gay icon, which he rejects. Instead, Wainwright declares he is "Rufus the Baptist", referring to John the Baptist, and sings: "I won't be the one/Baptised in cum". He says of the titular subject: "He will then be reborn from 1970s porn/wearing tube socks with style/and such an innocent smile". In his review of Want Two, Pitchfork's Stephen Deusner described the savior character as "Wainwright's own personal Jesus".

According to Wainwright, the song was inspired in part by the Israeli–Palestinian conflict. In 2004, he told The Independent:

Religious wars are back in fashion, and the main problem is that I don't empathise with religious sentiment. Gay people are not represented in that literature. So even though it's silly, I feel like I can't enter the conversation. So I decided to write a song about how the next messiah would be a homosexual. The Bible needs a gay gospel.

In 2005, he said of the song's origins:

It was written ages ago as a party song, to kind of liven up a dinner table. And then as the political climate thickened it became a kind of liberal anthem. On stage I began to preface it with a plea to go out and vote Democrat. And now it has become a kind of literal prayer. We do actually need this divine porn star to come down and teach us what it means to be human again...

== Reception ==
In his review of Want Two, BBC's Chris Jones said the song "is a fine example of [Wainwright's] tongue-in-cheek ability to mix the sacred and profane, heralding a Republican-baiting prophet".
