= Out of the Game Tour =

2012–13 concert tour by Rufus Wainwright

- Tour by Rufus Wainwright
- Promotional poster for the tour
- Associated album: Out of the Game
- Start date: April 23, 2012
- End date: November 2, 2013
- Legs: 10
- No. of shows: 62 in Europe; 64 in North America; 6 in Asia; 9 in Australasia; 4 in South America; 145 total

Rufus Wainwright concert chronology
- An Evening with Rufus Wainwright (2011); Out of the Game Tour (2012–13); The Best of Rufus Wainwright (2014)

The Out of the Game Tour was a concert tour by singer-songwriter Rufus Wainwright. The tour supports his seventh studio album, Out of the Game. Beginning in April 2012, the tour has played over 100 shows in the Americas, Asia, Europe and Australasia.

== Background ==
The tour was announced on Wainwright's official website, coinciding with the singer's album release. Behind the scenes, Wainwright married his long-term partner Jörn Weisbrodt while the singer had a break in his tour schedule. Wainwright explained his personal life would not only reflect in the album but also the tour. The singer continued to say that he would be touring less in the forthcoming years, while concentrating on being a parent.

The tour began with two rehearsal shows at Under the Bridge, a nightclub located within Stamford Bridge in London. The tour officially kicked off in Denmark. Some of the tour dates in Europe included festival appearances at the Montreux Jazz Festival, Melt! festival and the North Sea Jazz Festival.

== Opening acts ==
- Teddy Thompson (Europe—select dates) (New York City, Los Angeles, Melbourne— September 16)
- Krystle Warren (Europe—select dates) (Oakland, San Diego, Melbourne—September 15)
- Adam Cohen (North America—select dates)
- Megan Washington (Australia)
- Ingrid Michaelson (Vienna, Boston, Nashville)
- Lucy Wainwright Roche (Nashville)

== Setlist ==
North America

May 9, 2012 – New York City, NY – Howard Gilman Opera House

1. "Candles"
2. "Rashida"
3. "Barbara"
4. "Welcome to the Ball"
5. "Song of You"
6. "Greek Song"
7. "April Fools"
8. "The One You Love"
9. "Saratoga Summer Song" (performed by Teddy Thompson)
10. "I Don't Know" (performed by Krystle Warren)
11. "Respectable Dive"
12. "Out of the Game"
13. "Jericho"
14. "Sometimes You Need"
15. "Perfect Man"
16. "One Man Guy" (performed with Charysse Blackman and Teddy Thompson)
17. "Going to a Town"
18. "Montauk"
19. "14th Street"
20. "The Art Teacher"
21. "Tell My Sister" (performed by Martha Wainwright)
22. "Bitter Tears"

Encore

23. "Poses"

August 8, 2012 – Chicago, IL – The Vic Theatre

1. "Candles"
2. "Rashida"
3. "Barbara"
4. "April Fools"
5. "Song of You"
6. "The One You Love"
7. "Saratoga Summer Song" (performed by Teddy Thompson)
8. "I Don't Know" (performed by Krystle Warren)
9. "Respectable Dive"
10. "Out of the Game"
11. "Jericho"
12. "Perfect Man"
13. "The Man that Got Away"
14. "One Man Guy" (performed with Charysse Blackman and Teddy Thompson)
15. "The Art Teacher"
16. "Going to a Town"
17. "Montauk"
18. "14th Street"
19. "Bitter Tears"

Encore

23. "Grey Gardens"
24. "Chelsea Hotel #2" (performed with Adam Cohen)
25. "Cigarettes and Chocolate Milk"
26. "Poses"

April 13, 2013 – Saint Paul, MN – Fitzgerald Theater

1. "The Art Teacher"
2. "The Maker Makes"
3. "Vibrate"
4. "Out of the Game"
5. "Jericho"
6. "Who Are You New York?"
7. "Memphis Skyline"
8. "Hallelujah"

Intermission

1. "Going to a Town"
2. "Montauk"
3. "Zebulon"
4. "Cigarettes and Chocolate Milk"

Encore

13. "Millbrook"
14. "Walking Song"
15. "Complainte de la Butte"
16. "Foolish Love"

== Tour dates ==
| Date | City | Country | Venue |
|---|---|---|---|
Europe
| April 23, 2012 | Copenhagen | Denmark | Falconer Salen |
| April 25, 2012 | Berlin | Germany | Konzertsaal der Udk |
| April 27, 2012 | Amsterdam | Netherlands | Melkweg Rabozaal |
| April 29, 2012^{[A]} | London | England | indigO_{2} |
| April 30, 2012 | London | England | Lyceum Theatre |
| May 2, 2012 | Paris | France | La Cigale |
| May 4, 2012 | Granada | Spain | Auditorio del Generalife |
North America
| May 9, 2012 | New York City | United States | Howard Gilman Opera House |
| May 11, 2012 | Oakland | United States | Fox Oakland Theatre |
| May 12, 2012 | Los Angeles | United States | Orpheum Theatre |
| May 13, 2012 | San Diego | United States | Humphrey's by the Bay |
Europe
| June 1, 2012^{[B]} | Barcelona | Spain | Parc del Fòrum |
Asia
| June 3, 2012 | Yakum | Israel | Ronit Farm Amphitheater |
| June 4, 2012 | Tel Aviv | Israel | Reading 3 |
Europe
| June 6, 2012 | A Coruña | Spain | Palacio de la Ópera |
| June 8, 2012^{[C]} | Porto | Portugal | Parque da Cidade do Porto |
North America
| June 10, 2012^{[D]} | Toronto | Canada | Pecaut Square |
| June 15, 2012^{[E]} | Toronto | Canada | Massey Hall |
| June 28, 2012^{[F]} | Montreal | Canada | Quartier des Spectacles |
| June 30, 2012 | Ann Arbor | United States | Power Center for the Performing Arts |
| July 1, 2012 | Grand Rapids Charter Township | United States | Meijer Gardens Amphitheater |
Europe
| July 5, 2012^{[G]} | Montreux | Switzerland | Miles Davis Hall |
| July 6, 2012 | Vienna | Austria | Vienna State Opera House |
| July 7, 2012^{[H]} | Rotterdam | Netherlands | Rotterdam Ahoy |
| July 8, 2012^{[I]} | Liège | Belgium | Parc Reine Astrid |
| July 12, 2012^{[J]} | Ostrava | Czech Republic | Dolní oblast Vítkovice |
| July 13, 2012^{[K]} | Gräfenhainichen | Germany | Ferropolis |
| July 15, 2012^{[KA]} | Beccles | England | Henham Park |
| July 16, 2012 | Bath | England | The Forum |
| July 18, 2012 | Dublin | Ireland | Iveagh Gardens |
| July 20, 2012 | Venice | Italy | Teatro Verde |
North America
| July 24, 2012 | Vienna | United States | Filene Center |
| July 27, 2012 | Purchase | United States | The Performing Arts Center at Purchase |
| July 28, 2012 | Westhampton Beach | United States | Westhampton Beach Performing Arts Center |
| July 29, 2012 | Boston | United States | Bank of America Pavilion |
| July 31, 2012 | Portland | United States | State Theatre |
| August 1, 2012^{[L]} | South Burlington | United States | Higher Ground |
| August 3, 2012 | Cleveland | United States | House of Blues |
| August 4, 2012 | Munhall | United States | Carnegie Library Music Hall |
| August 5, 2012 | Louisville | United States | Iroquois Amphitheatre |
| August 7, 2012 | Bloomington | United States | Buskirk-Chumley Theater |
| August 8, 2012 | Chicago | United States | The Vic Theatre |
| August 10, 2012 | Milwaukee | United States | Pabst Theater |
| August 11, 2012 | Apple Valley | United States | Minnesota Zoo Amphitheater |
| August 26, 2012^{[M]} | East Hampton | United States | Guild Hall |
Australasia
| September 8, 2012 | Canberra | Australia | Canberra Theatre |
| September 9, 2012 | Sydney | Australia | Sydney Opera House |
| September 12, 2012^{[N]} | Brisbane | Australia | QPAC Concert Hall |
| September 15, 2012 | Melbourne | Australia | Hamer Hall |
| September 17, 2012 | Adelaide | Australia | Her Majesty's Theatre |
| September 19, 2012 | Perth | Australia | Riverside Theatre |
| September 21, 2012 | Auckland | New Zealand | Auckland Civic Theatre |
North America
| September 28, 2012 | Big Sur | United States | Henry Miller Memorial Library |
| October 1, 2012 | Seattle | United States | Benaroya Hall |
| October 2, 2012 | Vancouver | Canada | Orpheum Theatre |
| October 4, 2012 | Arcata | United States | Van Duzer Theatre |
| October 9, 2012 | Isla Vista | United States | UCSB Campbell Hall |
| October 11, 2012 | Riverside | United States | Riverside Fox Theater |
| October 13, 2012^{[O]} | Austin | United States | Zilker Metropolitan Park |
| October 14, 2012 | Dallas | United States | Meyerson Symphony Center |
| October 15, 2012 | Houston | United States | Bayou Music Center |
| October 18, 2012 | Conway | United States | Reynolds Performance Hall |
| October 19, 2012 | Nashville | United States | Ryman Auditorium |
| October 20, 2012 | Atlanta | United States | The Tabernacle |
| October 22, 2012 | Durham | United States | Carolina Theatre |
| October 23, 2012 | York | United States | Pullo Center |
| October 24, 2012 | Portsmouth | United States | The Music Hall |
| October 26, 2012 | Montreal | Canada | Saint-Jean-Baptiste Church |
| October 27, 2012 | Quebec City | Canada | Salle Albert-Rousseau |
| October 28, 2012 | Saguenay | Canada | Théâtre du Palais Municipal |
Europe
| November 13, 2012 | Dublin | Ireland | Vicar Street |
| November 14, 2012 | Belfast | Northern Ireland | Ulster Hall |
| November 16, 2012 | Oxford | England | New Theatre Oxford |
| November 17, 2012 | Birmingham | England | Symphony Hall |
| November 18, 2012 | London | England | Hammersmith Apollo |
| November 20, 2012 | Nottingham | England | Nottingham Royal Concert Hall |
| November 21, 2012 | York | England | Barbican Centre |
| November 23, 2012 | Bristol | England | Colston Hall |
| November 24, 2012 | Brighton | England | Brighton Dome |
| November 25, 2012 | Amsterdam | Netherlands | Heineken Music Hall |
| November 27, 2012 | Brussels | Belgium | Ancienne Belgique |
| November 28, 2012 | Hamburg | Germany | Laeiszhalle |
| November 29, 2012 | Randers | Denmark | Værket |
| December 1, 2012 | Stockholm | Sweden | Berns Salonger |
| December 2, 2012 | Oslo | Norway | Sentrum Scene |
| December 3, 2012 | Gothenburg | Sweden | Restaurang Trädgårn |
| December 5, 2012 | Frankfurt | Germany | Gibson Club |
| December 7, 2012 | San Sebastián | Spain | Auditorio Kursaal |
| December 8, 2012 | Madrid | Spain | Sala La Riviera |
| December 10, 2012 | Paris | France | Folies Bergère |
| December 11, 2012 | Manchester | England | O_{2} Apollo Manchester |
| December 13, 2012 | Edinburgh | Scotland | Usher Hall |
| December 14, 2012 | Glasgow | Scotland | O_{2} Academy Glasgow |
North America
| February 6, 2013 | Princeton | United States | McCarter Theatre |
| February 8, 2013 | Atlantic City | United States | Borgata Music Box |
| February 12, 2013 | Washington, D.C. | United States | 9:30 Club |
Asia
| March 16, 2013 | Seoul | South Korea | Uniqlo AX |
| March 18, 2013 | Osaka | Japan | Matsushita IMP Hall |
| March 19, 2013 | Tokyo | Japan | Shibuya Public Hall |
| March 21, 2013^{[P]} | Central Area | Singapore | Fort Canning |
Australia
| March 24, 2013^{[Q]} | Fremantle | Australia | Fremantle Park |
| April 1, 2013^{[R]} | Byron Bay | Australia | Tyagarah Tea Tree Farm |
| North America | | Australia | |
| April 11, 2013 | Milwaukee | United States | Pabst Theater |
| April 13, 2013^{[S]} | Saint Paul | United States | Fitzgerald Theater |
| April 14, 2013 | Chicago | United States | Maurer Hall |
| April 18, 2013 | Bay Shore | United States | YMCA Boulton Center for the Performing Arts |
| April 21, 2013^{[T]} | Philadelphia | United States | Verizon Hall |
| April 23, 2013^{[U]} | Toronto | Canada | Koerner Hall |
| May 7, 2013 | Mexico City | Mexico | Auditorio BB |
South America
| May 9, 2013 | São Paulo | Brazil | HSBC Brasil |
| May 10, 2013 | Porto Alegre | Brazil | Teatro do Bourbon Country |
| May 13, 2013 | Santiago | Chile | Teatro Nescafe de les Artes |
| May 15, 2013 | Buenos Aires | Argentina | Teatro Gran Rex |
Europe
| May 23, 2013 | Norrköping | Sweden | Louis De Geer |
| May 31, 2013 | The Hague | Netherlands | Dr. Anton Philipszaal |
| June 1, 2013 | The Hague | Netherlands | Dr. Anton Philipszaal |
| June 2, 2013^{[V]} | Dresden | Germany | Albertinum Inner Courtyard |
North America
| June 8, 2013 | Los Angeles | United States | Valley Performing Arts Center |
| June 9, 2013 | San Francisco | United States | Davies Symphony Hall |
| June 13, 2013 | Fort Worth | United States | Bass Performance Hall |
Europe
| June 30, 2013^{[W]} | Pilton | England | Worthy Farm |
| July 1, 2013 | Liverpool | England | Liverpool Philharmonic Hall |
| July 3, 2013 | Leicester | England | De Montfort Hall |
| July 5, 2013^{[X]} | Barcelona | Spain | Parc del Fòrum |
| July 6, 2013 | Antwerp | Belgium | Openluchttheater Rivierenhof |
| July 7, 2013 | Eindhoven | Netherlands | Muziekgebouw Frits Philips Eindhoven |
| July 10, 2013^{[Y]} | Lyon | France | Théatre Odéon Antique de Lyon |
| July 11, 2013 | Copenhagen | Denmark | Tivolis Koncertsal |
| July 13, 2013^{[Z]} | Riehen | Switzerland | Wenkenhof |
| July 16, 2013^{[AA]} | La Rochelle | France | La Coursive Grand Théâtre |
| July 22, 2013 | Madrid | Spain | Teatro Real |
| July 25, 2013^{[AB]} | São Julião da Barra | Portugal | Jardins do Marquês de Pombal |
| July 26, 2013^{[AC]} | Dubrovnik | Croatia | Revelin Fort Terrace |
| July 28, 2013^{[AD]} | Verbier | Switzerland | Eglise de Verbier |
North America
| October 4, 2013 | Tarrytown | United States | Tarrytown Music Hall |
| October 6, 2013 | Morristown | United States | Mayo Performing Arts Center |
| October 11, 2013 | Toronto | Canada | Roy Thomson Hall |
Europe
| October 21, 2013^{[AE]} | Prague | Czech Republic | Estates Theatre |
North America
| October 24, 2013 | Medford | United States | Craterian Theatre at the Collier Center |
| October 25, 2013 | Eugene | United States | Jaqua Concert Hall |
| October 26, 2013 | Portland | United States | Aladdin Theater |
| October 28, 2013 | Edmonds | United States | Edmonds Center for the Arts |
| October 29, 2013 | Olympia | United States | Washington Center for the Performing Arts |
| October 30, 2013 | Tacoma | United States | Pantages Theater |
| November 2, 2013 | Ottawa | Canada | Southam Hall |

Festivals and other miscellaneous performances

^{A} This concert was a part of the "Sundance London Music and Film Festival"
^{B} This concert was a part of "San Miguel Primavera Sound"
^{C} This concert was a part of "Optimus Primavera Sound"
^{D} This concert was a part of "Luminato"
^{E} This concert was a part of "Love Over and Over: The Songs of Kate McGarrigle"
^{F} This concert was a part of the "Festival International de Jazz de Montréal"
^{G} This concert was a part of the "Montreux Jazz Festival"
^{H} This concert was a part of the "North Sea Jazz Festival"
^{I} This concert was a part of "Les Ardentes"
^{J} This concert was a part of the "Colours of Ostrava"
^{K} This concert was a part of the "Melt! festival"
^{KA} This concert was a part of the "Latitude Festival"
^{L} This concert was a part of "Concerts on the Green"
^{M} This concert was a part of "Salomé Music Festival"
^{N} This concert was a part of the "Brisbane Festival"
^{O} This concert was a part of the "Austin City Limits Music Festival"

^{P} This concert was a part of "Timbre: Rock & Roots"
^{Q} This concert is a part of the "West Coast Blues & Roots Festival"
^{R} This concert is a part of the "Byron Bay Bluesfest
^{S} This concert was a part of "The Current Sessions"
^{T} This concert was a part of the "Philadelphia International Festival of the Arts"
^{U} This concert was a part of the "Shakespeare Slam"
^{V} This concert is a part of the "Dresden Music Festival"
^{W} This concert is a part of the "Glastonbury Festival"
^{X} This concert is a part of "Festival Cruïlla"
^{Y} This concert is a part of "Nuits de Fourvière"
^{Z} This concert is a part of the "Stimmen-Festival"
^{AA} This concert is a part of "Les Francofolies de La Rochelle"
^{AB} This concert is a part of "EDP Cool Jazz"
^{AC} This concert is a part of the "Dubrovnik Summer Festival"
^{AD} This concert is a part of the "Verbier Festival"
^{AE} This concert is a part of "Struny Podzimu"

Cancellations and rescheduled shows

| July 25, 2012 | Philadelphia | Festival Pier | Cancelled |
| August 1, 2012 | Shelburne, Vermont | The Green at Shelburne Museum | Moved to Higher Ground in South Burlington, Vermont |
| October 30, 2012 | New York City | Beacon Theatre | Cancelled due to Hurricane Sandy. This concert was a part of the "Freedom To Love Now!". |
| February 9, 2013 | Bay Shore, New York | YMCA Boulton Center for the Performing Arts | Rescheduled for April 18, 2013 |

=== Box office score data ===
| Venue | City | Tickets sold / available | Gross revenue |
|---|---|---|---|
| Howard Gilman Opera House | New York City | 2,026 / 2,097 (97%) | $115,500 |
| Fox Oakland Theatre | Oakland | 1,548 / 1,766 (88%) | $67,740 |
| Canberra Theatre | Canberra | 574 / 1,195 (48%) | $68,084 |
| Sydney Opera House | Sydney | 1,753 / 2,239 (78%) | $250,516 |
| QPAC Concert Hall | Brisbane | 692 / 1,518 (46%) | $81,646 |
| Hamer Hall | Melbourne | 2,716 / 4,786 (57%) | $334,283 |
| Her Majesty's Theatre | Adelaide | 557 / 1,009 (55%) | $65,557 |
| Riverside Theatre | Perth | 634 / 1,118 (57%) | $70,817 |
| Ryman Auditorium | Nashville | 1,460 / 2,211 (66%) | $56,670 |
| Saint-Jean-Baptiste Church | Montreal | 1,268 / 1,459 (87%) | $88,729 |
| Salle Albert-Rousseau | Quebec City | 756 / 900 (84%) | $48,190 |
| Théâtre du Palais Municipal | Saguenay | 495 / 620 (80%) | $26,681 |
| 9:30 Club | Washington, D.C. | 899 / 1200 (75%) | $35,960 |
| Auditorio Blackberry | Mexico City | 724 / 2,051 (35%) | $15,855 |
| TOTAL | | 16,102 / 24,169 (67%) | $1,326,228 |

== Critical reception ==
The tour was met with mixed reviews from music critics. For the first North American concert in New York City, Jon Pareles (The New York Times), felt the concert was a nice blend of Wainwright current and past songs. He continues to say "At times there was friction between Mr. Wainwright's long melody lines and the shuffle and strut of their settings. But his supposed turn to pop isn’t a drastic change; older songs like 'April Fools' and 'Greek Song' showed he has been in that territory before".

The show was also praised by Simon Vozick-Levinson (Rolling Stone). He says "But for the most part, this was a night of pure pop joy. Afterward, he took a deep bow, accepted a bouquet from someone in the front rows—his second of the night—and walked offstage with a delighted grin". For the concert at the Ronit Farm Amphitheater, Rachel Marder (The Jerusalem Post) felt Wainwright channelled Elton John. She writes, "The show felt like a true ensemble performance, with the saxophone-player, clarinetist, drummer and backup singers all taking solos".

In Louisville, Selna Frye (louisville.com) thinks the singer gave a stellar night of song. She comments, "As entertaining and musically rich as this show was, one primary thing I came away with—and maybe others did too—was an appreciation of Wainwright's unselfishness in giving these other fine artists their moments in the spotlight". At the Chicago show, Megan Ritt (Consequence of Sound), stated Wainwright was a "consummate performer". She goes on to say "The rarities he played certainly will stick with long-time fans, but the most impressive feature of the show was how the sometimes somber Wainwright appeared to enjoy the experience as much as the audience". At the Pabst Theatre in Milwaukee, Piet Levy stated, "His gorgeous operatic croon, heard alone, essentially served as the light".

The concert at the famed Sydney Opera House received a less favorable review. Iain Shedden (The Australian) writes that following a magnificent show, Wainwright ended it like a "high school end-of-term pantomime". He further explains, "The 90 minutes was a near-perfect blend of pop smarts and raw emotion, of which the singer seems to have an unlimited supply. The encore, however, was a horror of such significance, it threatened to undo everything that came before". At the Vicar Street in Dubin, Lauren Murphy (The Irish Times) gave the show three out of five stars. She writes, "Roving the aisles singing 'Gay Messiah', his intention to entertain is acknowledged—but another two or three songs in place of the pantomime-style silliness would have been more heartily appreciated. It's an unfortunate end to an otherwise stirring show".

== Band ==
- Keyboard: Andy Burton
- Guitar: Sharief Hobley and Teddy Thompson
- Bass guitar: Brad Albetta
- Drums: Ben Perowsky
- Horns: Tim Ries
- Supporting vocals: Charysse Blackman and Krystle Warren
