= Vibrate: The Best of Rufus Wainwright =

Greatest hits album by Rufus Wainwright
- Released: February 28, 2014
- Length: 76:59 (standard), 134:57 (deluxe)
- Label: Universal Music Enterprises

Rufus Wainwright chronology
Out of the Game (2012)	Vibrate: The Best of Rufus Wainwright (2014)	Rufus Wainwright: Live from the Artists Den (2014)

Singles from Vibrate: The Best of Rufus Wainwright
- 1. "Me and Liza" Released: January 20, 2014

Vibrate: The Best of Rufus Wainwright, sometimes referred to simply as Vibrate: The Best Of, is the greatest hits album by American-Canadian singer-songwriter Rufus Wainwright, released on February 28, 2014 in Australia and Ireland by Universal Music Enterprises and in other nations subsequently. The standard issue of the album includes eighteen songs from six of Wainwright's studio releases, including his self-titled debut album (1998), Poses (2001), Want One (2003), Want Two (2004), Release the Stars (2007) and Out of the Game (2012), plus soundtrack contributions and one previously unreleased track ("Me and Liza"). The deluxe version includes a bonus disc with sixteen rare and unreleased recordings, both live and studio recorded. Featured are "Chic and Pointless", previously unreleased and produced by Guy Chambers, and "WWIII", a song that was co-written by Chambers and had not been released in a physical form until Vibrate.

The compilation and associated tour dates were announced on Wainwright's official website in December 2013. The "greatest hits" tour, called The Best of Rufus Wainwright, had Wainwright performing more than thirty shows in over twenty countries throughout Europe and the United States during March–April 2014. The tour began in Dublin on March 4 and ended in Coventry on April 27. Tracks for the compilation were selected by Wainwright and Neil Tennant. "Me and Liza", released on January 20, 2014, served as the album's lead single.

== Composition ==
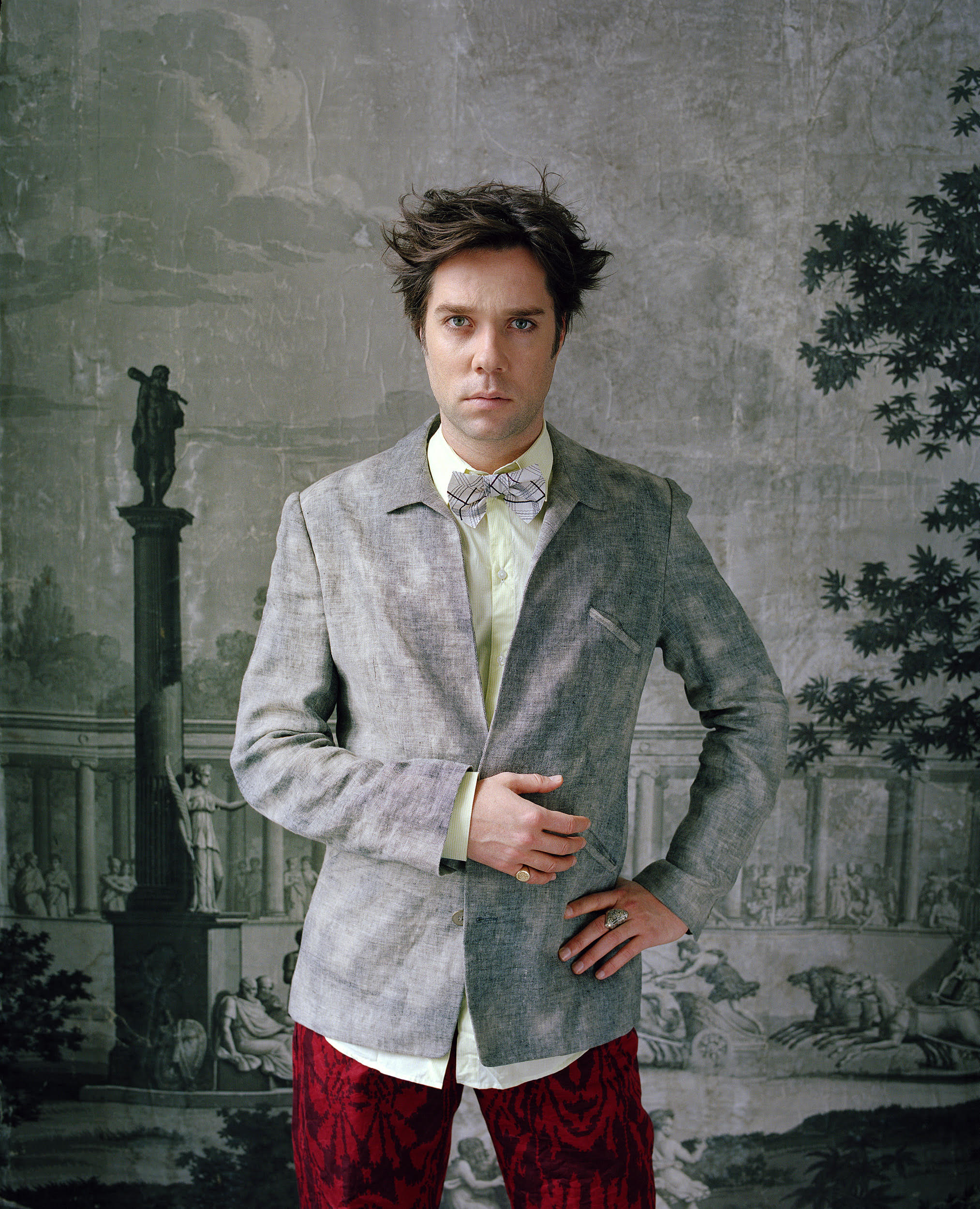
Wainwright in 2010

The standard issue of Vibrate includes eighteen tracks that span Wainwright's career, from his eponymous debut album (1998) to Out of the Game (2012), plus one previously unreleased track. The songs were chosen by Wainwright, his publicist and Neil Tennant. Tracks from Rufus Wainwright include "April Fools" and "Foolish Love". "Poses", "Cigarettes and Chocolate Milk" and "Grey Gardens" originally appeared on Wainwright's second studio album, Poses (2001). Five tracks are from his third studio album Want One (2003): "Oh What a World", "Vibrate" (the album's namesake), "I Don't Know What It Is", "Go or Go Ahead" and "Dinner at Eight". "The One You Love" and "The Art Teacher" appeared on Want Two (2004). Two of the compilation's songs originally appeared on Wainwright's fifth studio album Release the Stars (2007): "Going to a Town" and "Tiergarten". Songs from Out of the Game include the title track and "Sometimes You Need". "Hallelujah", written by Leonard Cohen, originally appeared on the soundtrack to the 2001 film Shrek. "Me and Liza", previously unreleased, was co-written by Guy Chambers.

The deluxe edition includes a bonus disc with sixteen rare and unreleased live and studio recordings. Featured are "Chic and Pointless", previously unreleased and produced by Chambers, and "WWIII", co-written by Chambers; Vibrate marks the latter's first physical release. Chris Coplan of Consequence of Sound described "Chic and Pointless" as a "disco-fied homage to Nile Rodgers & Co." "One Man Guy", written by Wainwright's father Loudon Wainwright III, originally appeared on Poses. The version on Vibrate was recorded live at KCRW in June 2001 and features Butch, Richard Causon, Jeff Hill, Teddy Thompson and Martha Wainwright. "Across the Universe" (Lennon–McCartney) originally served as a bonus track on a 2002 re-issue of Poses, released following a recording for the soundtrack to the film I Am Sam (2001). "Chelsea Hotel No. 2", co-written by Cohen and Ron Cornelius, was previously included as a bonus track for Want Two and was also featured in the film and soundtrack for Leonard Cohen: I'm Your Man (2005). Other soundtrack releases include "The Maker Makes", from the soundtrack to Brokeback Mountain (2005), and "La Complainte de la Butte" (Jean Renoir), from the soundtrack to Moulin Rouge! (2001).

"Jericho" and "Montauk" were recorded for Live from the Artists Den in 2012. Studio versions originally appeared on Out of the Game, as did "Bitter Tears", the opening track for Vibrate's bonus disc. "If Love Were All" (Noël Coward), "Do It Again" (Buddy DeSylva, George Gershwin) and "Zing! Went the Strings of My Heart" (James F. Hanley), all recorded live at Kenwood House in London in 2010, were performed on Wainwright's live album Rufus Does Judy at Carnegie Hall (2007), a re-creation of Judy Garland's 1961 album Judy at Carnegie Hall. "Memphis Skyline" and "Martha" were also recorded at Kenwood House in 2010. Studio versions originally appeared on Want Two and All Days Are Nights: Songs for Lulu (2010), Wainwright's sixth studio album, respectively. The disc's final track is a BBC interview with Jo Whiley, recorded at the Royal Opera House on July 28, 2011 for the program In Concert.

== Promotion ==
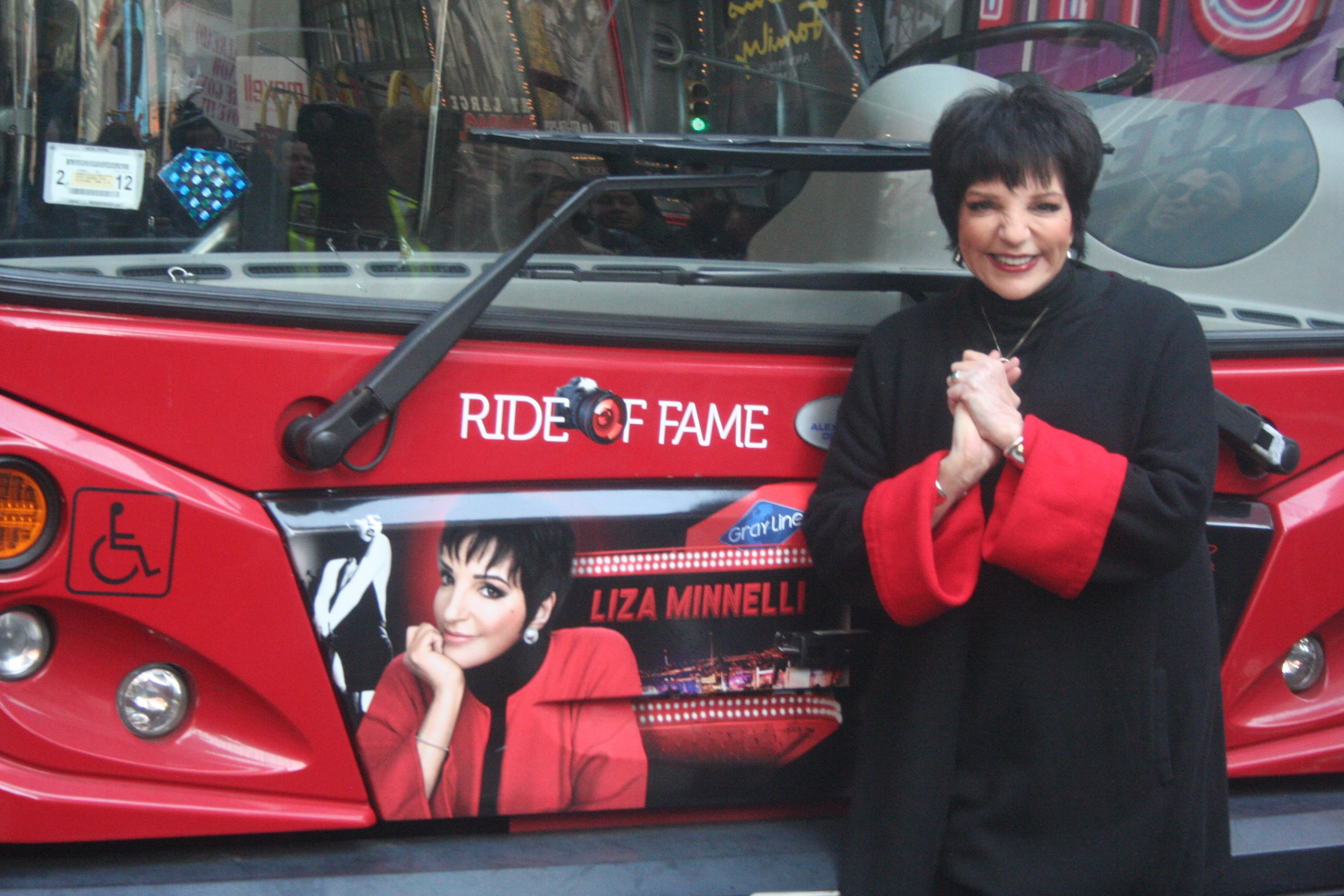
Liza Minnelli, the subject of the album's lead single, in 2011

News of the compilation was picked up by outlets following the December 9, 2013 announcement on Wainwright's official site. In the January 2014 issue of Gay Times, Wainwright said of the album: "I hit 40 recently, and in that time span a lot has happened. I lost my mother, I had a daughter, I wrote an opera, I'm married... so we've kind of come full circle. I wanted to return to a more industry-friendly stance and Vibrate makes a nice bookend. Sort of an encapsulation of my youth. I'm still vaguely young, but 40 is a whole other ball game." An interactive sampler was published to YouTube and Wainwright's official site on February 20, 2014.

"Me and Liza" served as the album's lead single and has been described as a "sultry, Bowie-esque pop-rock ballad". The song premiered on BBC Radio 2's Weekend Wogan on January 12, 2014 and was officially released on January 20. "Me and Liza" is about Wainwright's relationship with Liza Minnelli, who was reportedly upset by his 2006 tribute concerts to her mother, American actress and singer Judy Garland. Wainwright re-created Garland's concert album Judy at Carnegie Hall (1961), later releasing his own live album Rufus Does Judy at Carnegie Hall (2007). Wainwright said of the song: "I have to be very diplomatic with the track. Let's just say it's about legend and arson. It's very playful. A playful jab. Oh, and you know, possibly a hit?" In Belgium (Flanders), "Me and Liza" entered the Ultratop singles chart at number 98 and reached a peak position of number 59. An official lyric video was released for the song on February 24, 2014.

=== Tour ===
On December 11, 2013, Wainwright's official website announced a 23-date "greatest hits" tour throughout Europe, during which Wainwright will perform in twenty countries in the months of March and April 2014. The tour, called The Best of Rufus Wainwright, began on March 4 at Vicar Street in Dublin, Ireland. On December 20, it was announced that the tour would be extended to include two shows in France (April 23 and 25). In January 2014, additional concerts were announced for New York, Washington, D.C., Los Angeles and San Francisco, plus Coventry, United Kingdom, extending the tour to April 27. Wainwright's half-sister, Lucy Wainwright Roche, has been confirmed as the opening act for several performances.

== Reception ==
Vibrate has received a generally positive reception, with most music critics offering commentary on the collection's previously unreleased tracks. Fife Today's John Murray complimented the live tracks that appear on the bonus disc. Pete Mitchell of Radio Times called the compilation a "wonderful compendium of his classic style and his experimental edge that makes him unique". Nick Collings of the New Zealand magazine Rip It Up called the album a "delight" for fans of Wainwright's work and a "solid gold introduction" for those who were unfamiliar with his repertoire.

== Track listing ==
Standard edition
No.	Title	Writer(s)	Length
1.	"Going to a Town" (from Release the Stars, 2007)	Rufus Wainwright	4:07
2.	"Out of the Game" (from Out of the Game, 2012)	Wainwright	4:06
3.	"Me and Liza"	Guy Chambers, Wainwright	3:21
4.	"Hallelujah" (from Shrek: Music from the Original Motion Picture, 2001)	Leonard Cohen	4:12
5.	"Oh What a World" (from Want One, 2003)	Wainwright	4:25
6.	"April Fools" (from Rufus Wainwright, 1998)	Wainwright	5:03
7.	"Poses" (from Poses, 2001)	Wainwright	5:01
8.	"Cigarettes and Chocolate Milk" (from Poses, 2001)	Wainwright	4:42
9.	"Vibrate" (from Want One, 2003)	Wainwright	2:45
10.	"The One You Love" (from Want Two, 2004)	Wainwright	3:45
11.	"I Don't Know What It Is" (from Want One, 2003)	Wainwright	4:53
12.	"The Art Teacher" (from Want Two, 2004)	Wainwright	3:53
13.	"Go or Go Ahead" (from Want One, 2003)	Wainwright	6:40
14.	"Dinner at Eight" (from Want One, 2003)	Wainwright	4:34
15.	"Foolish Love" (from Rufus Wainwright, 1998)	Wainwright	5:46
16.	"Sometimes You Need" (from Out of the Game, 2012)	Wainwright	3:23
17.	"Grey Gardens" (from Poses, 2001)	Wainwright	3:06
18.	"Tiergarten" (from Release the Stars, 2007)	Wainwright	3:27

Deluxe edition bonus disc
No.	Title	Writer(s)	Length
1.	"Bitter Tears" (from Out of the Game, 2012)	Wainwright	3:33
2.	"The Maker Makes" (from Brokeback Mountain: Original Motion Picture Soundtrack, 2005)	Wainwright	3:49
3.	"Across the Universe" (from Poses [bonus track], 2002)	Lennon–McCartney	4:09
4.	"La Complainte de la Butte" (from Moulin Rouge! Music from Baz Luhrmann's Film, 2001)	George Van Parys, Jean Renoir	3:08
5.	"Chelsea Hotel No. 2" (from Want Two [bonus track], 2004)	Cohen, Ron Cornelius	3:56
6.	"Chic and Pointless"	Wainwright	3:49
7.	"WWIII" (from Out of the Game [bonus track], 2012)	Chambers, Wainwright	3:57
8.	"Jericho" (Live from the Artist's Den)	Wainwright	3:42
9.	"Montauk" (Live from the Artist's Den)	Wainwright	3:54
10.	"If Love Were All" (Live at Kenwood House 2010)	Noël Coward	2:40
11.	"Do It Again" (Live at Kenwood House 2010)	Buddy DeSylva, George Gershwin	5:10
12.	"Zing! Went the Strings of My Heart" (Live at Kenwood House 2010)	James F. Hanley	2:36
13.	"Memphis Skyline" (Live at Kenwood House 2010)	Wainwright	4:46
14.	"Martha" (Live at Kenwood House 2010)	Wainwright	3:17
15.	"One Man Guy" (Live at KCRW 2001)	Loudon Wainwright III	4:44
16.	"BBC Interview with Jo Whiley" (Royal Opera House 2011)	—	0:58

== Personnel ==
- Mark Allan – photography
- Butch – primary artist
- Richard Causon – primary artist
- Simone Ceeehetti – photography
- Guy Chambers – composer
- Matthias Clamer – photography
- Leonard Cohen – composer
- Bernadette Colomine – translation
- Noël Coward – composer
- Buddy DeSylva – composer
- Joséphine Douet – photography
- Pam Duns – photography
- Natalia Faulkner – photography
- David Gahr – photography
- George Gershwin – composer
- Tim Hailand – photography
- James F. Hanley – composer
- Rune Hellestad – photography
- Jeff Hill – primary artist
- The Kick Horns – ensemble, orchestra
- Gie Knaeps – photography
- Alex Lake – back cover photo, illustrations
- John Lennon – composer
- Paul McCartney – composer
- Anna McGarrigle – accordion, liner Notes
- Kate McGarrigle – piano
- John-Paul Pietrus – back cover photo, cover photo
- Stefan M. Prager – photography
- Liesbeth R. – photography
- Jean Renoir – composer
- Teddy Thompson – primary artist
- Bonnie Tompkins – illustrations
- Georges Van Parys – composer
- Loudon Wainwright III – composer
- Martha Wainwright – primary artist
- Rufus Wainwright – composer, primary artist
- Teddy Wainwright – tributee
- Alex Wharton – mastering
- Jo Whiley – interviewer
- Joel Zifkin – violin

== Charts ==
Chart (2014)	Peak position
Belgian Albums (Ultratop Flanders)	63
Belgian Albums (Ultratop Wallonia)	92
Dutch Albums (Album Top 100)	43
French Albums (SNEP)	121
Scottish Albums (Official Charts)	26
UK Albums (Official Charts)	39

== Release history ==
Region	Date	Label
Australia	February 28, 2014	Universal Music Australia
Ireland	February 28, 2014	Universal Music Ireland
United Kingdom	March 3, 2013	Universal Music UK
United States	March 3, 2014	Universal
Canada	March 4, 2014	Universal Music Canada
Spain	March 4, 2014	Universal Music Spain
New Zealand	March 7, 2014	Universal Music
