= Me and Liza =

Single by Rufus Wainwright

from the album Vibrate: The Best of Rufus Wainwright
- Released: January 20, 2014
- Genre: Pop rock
- Length: 3:21
- Label: Universal
- Songwriters: Rufus Wainwright, Guy Chambers

"Me and Liza" is a song by American-Canadian singer-songwriter Rufus Wainwright for his greatest hits album, Vibrate: The Best of Rufus Wainwright (2014); it appears as the third track on the album's standard issue, serving as its lead single. The song is about Wainwright's relationship with Liza Minnelli, who was reportedly upset by his 2006 tribute concerts to her mother, Judy Garland. It premiered on BBC Radio 2's Weekend Wogan on January 12, 2014 and was officially released on January 20. "Me and Liza" reached a peak position of number 59 on Belgium's Ultratop singles chart.

== Background and composition ==
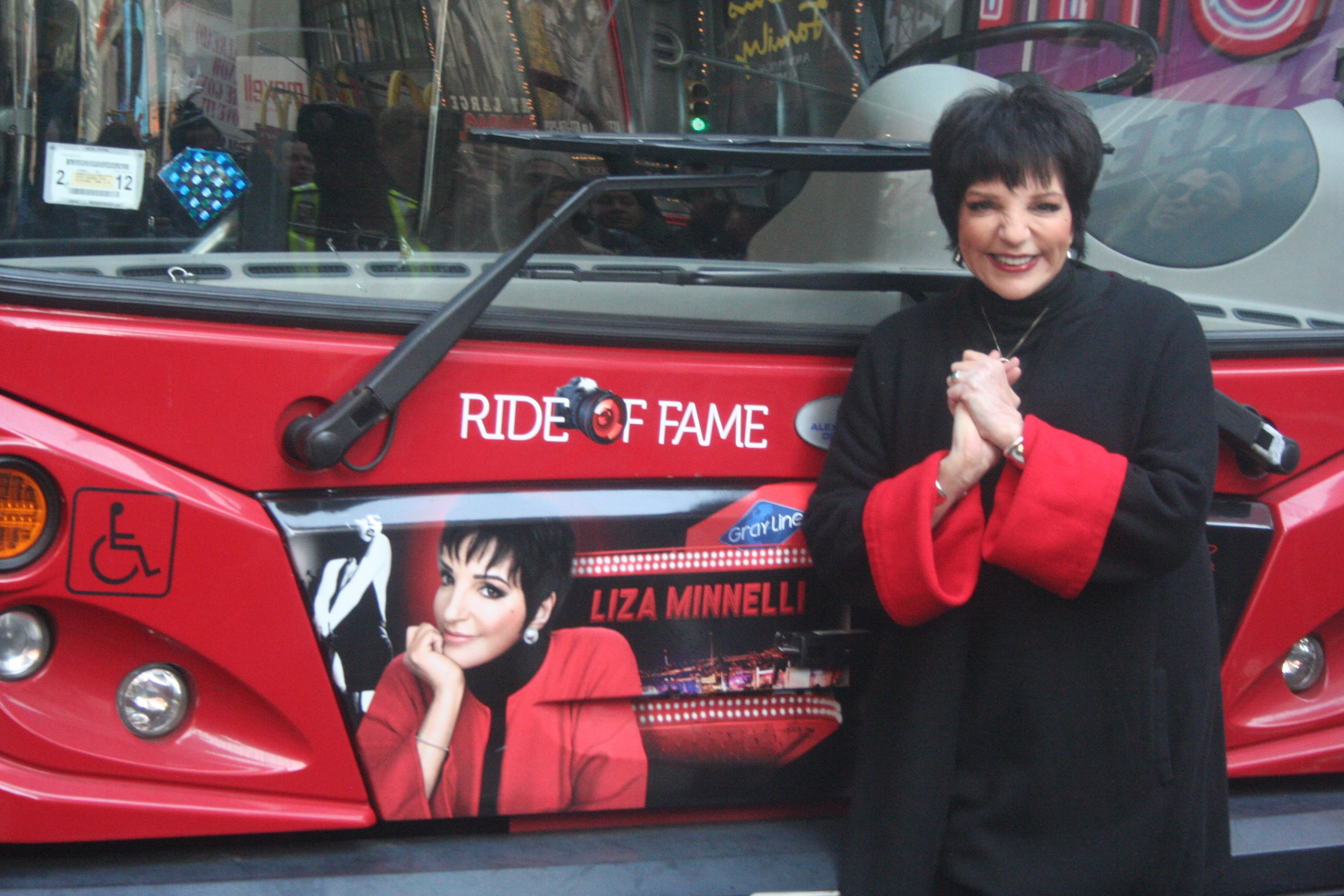
Liza Minnelli, the subject of the album's lead single, in 2011

"Me and Liza" is about Wainwright's relationship with Liza Minnelli, who was reportedly upset by his 2006 tribute concerts to her mother, American actress and singer Judy Garland. Wainwright re-created Garland's concert album Judy at Carnegie Hall (1961), later releasing his own live album Rufus Does Judy at Carnegie Hall (2007). Wainwright said of the song: "I have to be very diplomatic with the track. Let's just say it's about legend and arson. It's very playful. A playful jab. Oh, and you know, possibly a hit?" In a March 2014 interview published by Radio Times, Wainwright went into more detail:

"I'm trying to be as chivalrous as possible here. I'm a big Liza fan and a big Judy fan and I can't say that Ms Minnelli has been too thrilled by my ovations. When I performed the Judy Garland show, she really didn't really get it. I could not tell you what's wrong, I suppose anything to do with her mother makes it very difficult for her. My dad grew up with Liza for a couple of years in Beverly Hills, so they were friends as kids. I think I've become her recurring nightmare."

Chris Coplan of Consequence of Sound described the song as a "sultry, Bowie-esque pop-rock ballad". The song begins with a bass drum and cymbal rhythm, accompanied by acoustic guitar; David Whiteway of Renowned for Sound wrote that the song's beginning is "saturated in a sense of hesitance and tenseness, a parallel to how his relationship with Liza stood at the time". As a driving bass line emerges, lyrically Wainwright references his father's "connection" to Minnelli years ago. The chorus describes the "perils" that come with fame and being members of well-known families. Wainwright sings that he and "Liza" are now friends, that he looks forward to their next reunion, and that they will be "famous til the day that [they] die". An "uplifting" horn section accompanies the final chorus. Whiteway noted that "Rufus leaves it until the final lines of the song to correct the inherent syntax errors, singing "Liza and I" as his iconic vocals fade out."

== Promotion ==
On January 12, 2014, BBC Radio 2's Weekend Wogan premiered "Me and Liza", the lead single for Vibrate: The Best of Rufus Wainwright. Wainwright's official website made the song available for streaming, via an embedded YouTube video, around the same time. Universal Music UK also made it available to stream on SoundCloud. The single was officially released on January 20, 2014.

"Me and Liza" was heavily promoted in the United Kingdom. On January 17, BBC London 94.9 included the song on its "Three Track Review". Weekend Wogan aired the track again, one week following its premiere. It also aired on BBC Radio Wales, Graham Norton's BBC Radio 2 program, and BBC Radio 6. In Canada, the single was included in new music rotations for CBC's radio networks and streams from January 29 – February 9, including the CBC Radio 2 roster and the "Adult Alternative" and "Canadian Songwriter" streams. Rock 95, an independent radio station based in Central Ontario, included "Me and Liza" on its "New Rock Hour" program. The Chilean radio station Duna 98.7 highlighted the song on their website. An official lyric video was released for the song on February 24, 2014.

== Reception and charts ==
Clash's Robin Murray called "Me and Liza" a "glamorous show tune, harking back to the glory days of the West End". Contactmusic.com said the song "kicks off with an understated almost bare driving beat before Rufus's trademark vocal comes sweeping over the top, building into a sumptuous, soaring chorus and climactic end". Gigwise's Andrew Trendell wrote that the track has an "addictive bassline and confident swagger", and categorized it as one of the "poppier tones" on the album. David Smyth of the London Evening Standard called the song "perky" in his round-up of the week's "best new music". David Whiteway of Renowned for Sound awarded "Me and Liza" four out of five stars and said that, "set amongst the cream of his 16 year, 7 studio album career", the song could "reaffirm [Wainwright's] status as one of the great songwriters of his generation."

In Belgium (Flanders), "Me and Liza" entered the Ultratop singles chart at number 98 and reached a peak position of number 59. For the week of January 24, 2014, the song entered CBC Radio 2's "Top 20" chart at number 20. The following week, Wainwright's rank on the chart increased by eight positions to number 12; he was named the "hot shooter" for having the greatest leap. In the two weeks following, "Me and Liza" jumped to number four, then fell two positions to number six.

Chart (2014)	Peak position
Belgium (Ultratop 50 Flanders)	59

== Track listing ==
- Digital download
1. "Me and Liza" – 3:21
