= Out of the Game =

Studio album by Rufus Wainwright
- Released: April 20, 2012
- Recorded: May–December 2011
- Studios: Dunham Sound, New York City; Sear Sound, New York City
- Genres: Baroque pop; pop rock; pop; soft rock
- Length: 50:28
- Label: Decca/Polydor
- Producer: Mark Ronson

Rufus Wainwright chronology
House of Rufus (2011)	Out of the Game (2012)	Vibrate: The Best of Rufus Wainwright (2014)

Singles from Out of the Game
- 1. "Out of the Game" Released: March 2012; 2. "Jericho" Released: July 2, 2012

Out of the Game is the seventh studio album by singer-songwriter Rufus Wainwright, released in Australia, the United Kingdom and Canada in April 2012 and in the United States on May 1, 2012 through Decca Records/Polydor Records. The album was produced by Mark Ronson. Recording sessions began in May 2011. Guest musicians include his sister Martha Wainwright, Thomas "Doveman" Bartlett, drummer Andy Burrows, guitarist Nels Cline, members of the Dap-Kings, Sean Lennon, the alternative rock band Wilco, Miike Snow's Andrew Wyatt and Yeah Yeah Yeahs guitarist Nick Zinner.

Wainwright and Ronson began recording the album in New York in May 2011. Following initial recording sessions, Wainwright participated in a five-night residency at the Royal Opera House in London to promote the release of his compilation box set House of Rufus. He resumed recording in the fall of 2011 after taking the summer off to spend time with his newborn daughter Viva. By December 2011 Wainwright and Ronson were finished mixing the album with Tom Elmhirst and several publications included Out of the Game on their lists of most anticipated releases for 2012. Recording and mixing took place at Dunham Sound in Brooklyn and Sear Sound in Manhattan. Wainwright claimed that Out of the Game contained the "poppiest", most "danceable" music in his repertoire to date and was influenced by the birth of his daughter and the death of his mother, Kate McGarrigle. Musical influences included David Bowie, Elton John and Queen.

Wainwright began touring to promote the album in April 2012. "Out of the Game" was the album's first single, released in March via iTunes and April via Decca/Polydor.

== Background ==
I just want to make something that you love, driving around in your car listening or losing your mind to on a dance floor. Something to serenade us through these very, very troubling times.

— Wainwright on his goal for the album

Wainwright and Ronson began recording the album in New York in May 2011. Gigwise.com reported then that former Razorlight drummer Andy Burrows had been invited to contribute to the recording sessions. Wainwright also revealed that the album would contain the "poppiest" music in his repertoire to date, with the "main objective" that it should mostly be "danceable". In May 2011, Rolling Stone reported that candidate tracks for the final release included a tribute to Wainwright's late mother, Kate McGarrigle, called "Candles", "I'm Out of the Game", about "giving up stardom", and a song about Montauk, New York (where Wainwright and his partner have a house). Wainwright shared that his daughter Viva influenced the album, stating: "There's nothing like impressing a little girl – nothing quite as lovely, and sometimes nothing quite as difficult. I've written three songs about her already." Following May recording sessions, Wainwright participated in a five-night residency at the Royal Opera House in London to promote the release of his compilation box set House of Rufus. He took the summer off to spend time with Viva and resumed recording in the fall of 2011.

Wainwright told Rolling Stone in October 2011 that he and Ronson were recording in Brooklyn with the Dap-Kings, a process he described as "fantastic". Sean Michaels of The Guardian reported in December 2011 that Wainwright and Ronson were mixing the album after less than two months of recording and that Out of the Game would be released in the spring of 2012. Wainwright described the collection as "manly", "sexy" and his "most sort of 'pop' and commercially viable, radio-friendly work". He also revealed that guest artists appearing on the album included his sister Martha Wainwright, Sean Lennon, the alternative rock band Wilco guitarist Nels Cline and Thomas "Doveman" Bartlett. According to Ronson, mixing with Tom Elmhirst completed on December 15. Recording and mixing took place at Dunham Sound in Brooklyn and Sear Sound in Manhattan. It was revealed in February 2012 that Miike Snow's Andrew Wyatt had also contributed to Out of the Game; later that month, Drowned in Sound revealed that Yeah Yeah Yeahs guitarist Nick Zinner would also appear on the album.

According to Wainwright, he provided to Ronson demo recordings of tracks nearly one year prior to production.

== Promotion ==
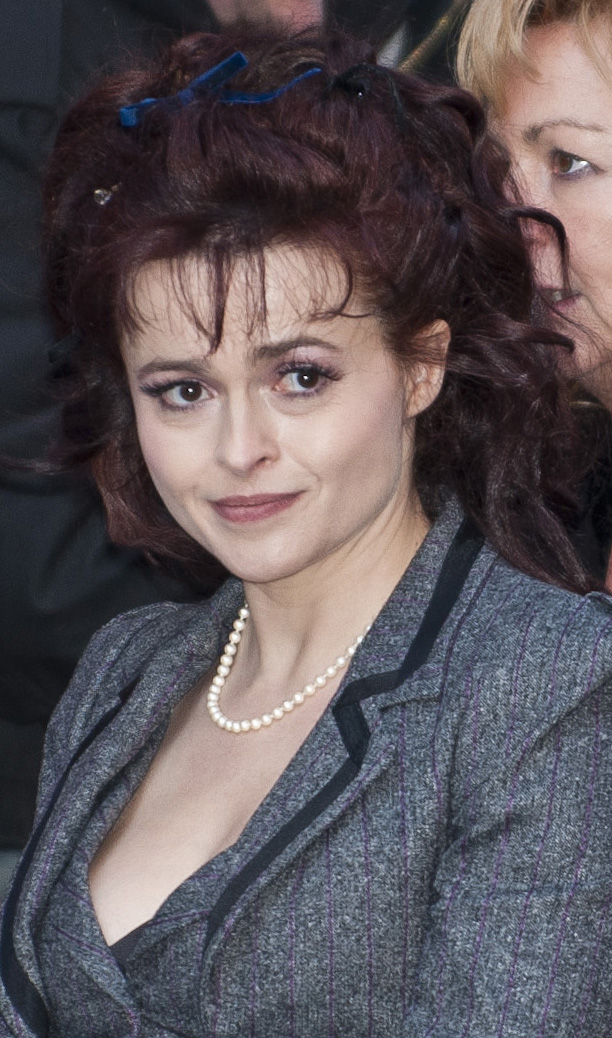
The music video for "Out of the Game" features actress Helena Bonham Carter.

In March 2011, Wainwright performed "Out of the Game" at the Hope North Ping-Pong Ball, a fundraiser for the Uganda boarding school dedicated to educating orphans and young refugees. The album received attention in December 2011 when Wainwright appeared on Late Night with Jimmy Fallon and performed the French version of "O Holy Night" with The Roots. In late 2011 and early 2012 several publications included Out of the Game on their lists of most anticipated releases for 2012. "Montauk" was featured as KCRW's "Today's Top Tune" on February 17, 2012, marking the song's world premiere. Several days later, Drowned in Sound released an exclusive album "teaser" video offering music samples, photo shoot footage, and clips featuring Wainwright and Ronson. Drowned in Sound also revealed that "Out of the Game" would be the first single from the album and would be available for purchase on March 16 via iTunes and April 16 via Decca/Polydor. Ronson posted a long excerpt from "Out of the Game" on his Tumblr page on February 22. The album's cover art was revealed on Facebook and Wainwright's official site on February 28. "Out of the Game" premiered in the United Kingdom on February 29 when Wainwright appeared on the Jo Whiley Show on BBC Radio 2. The song was made available on YouTube soon after.

The music video for "Out of the Game" was filmed in the Library of the Zoological Society of London in early March. It features actress Helena Bonham Carter, a friend of Wainwright's, as a "straight-laced librarian driven into a lustful frenzy" by Wainwright's multiple personalities. His personas include a "debonaire" man wearing a fedora, a woman (Wainwright in drag), and a "drugged-out Sonic Youth-obsessed dope fiend". Bonham Carter lip syncs to Wainwright's lyrics throughout the video; by the end she is lying in the bed dressed in a lace corset, having succumbed to the passion exuded by Wainwright's characters. The music video received mixed critical reception; many reviewers offered commentary on Wainwright's use of drag and noted that his characters appear to have sex with one another. Rich Lopez of the Dallas Voice thought Carter "anchored" the music video and found Wainwright's performance "distracting".

=== Tour ===
To promote the album, Wainwright began touring in April 2012. He performed songs from the album during a six-date European tour including performances in Denmark, Germany, the Netherlands, the United Kingdom, France and Spain. Wainwright also performed at the Sundance London Music and Film Festival on April 29. Another mini-tour is scheduled from May 9–13 and will feature performances in Brooklyn and three cities in California (Oakland, Los Angeles, San Diego). Wainwright will return to Europe for concerts in Spain, Israel and Portugal in June 2012. He is scheduled to perform in Dublin on July 18. Between July 24 and August 11 he will tour throughout the United States. Ten concerts are scheduled in the United Kingdom between November 16 and December 14. Additional concerts are scheduled in Europe, including Belgium, Sweden, Norway and France during late November and early December.

== Composition ==
Songs appearing on the album were influenced by the music of David Bowie, Elton John and Queen. The opening title track, which served as the album's first single, was influenced by "YouTube obsessed" youth. Wainwright said of the track: "For the first two verses I'm complaining, but in the third verse, it's tinged with envy as well. I'd like to be that age again and that silly, that excited about idiotic things. So I'm not being insensitive, just tired." Wainwright wrote "Welcome to the Ball" years prior to the album's release for a possible Broadway musical and described the composition as "completely wild and orchestral". "Montauk", addressed to Wainwright's daughter about the home in the New York town of the same name where he and his partner live, has been described as having a "lazy, infectious carousel-like" rhythm.

== Critical reception ==
Professional ratings
Aggregate scores
Source	Rating
Metacritic	77/100
Review scores
Source	Rating
AllMusic	4/5 stars
The Daily Telegraph	4/5 stars
Drowned in Sound	6/10
Entertainment Weekly	A−
The Guardian	4/5 stars
The Independent	3/5 stars
Paste	9/10
Pitchfork	6.8/10

Following the premiere of "Montauk", which received mixed reception, several reviewers noted the rolling arpeggio-driven, ballad nature of the song contrary to Wainwright's description of the album as pop music. After Ronson posted "Out of the Game" on his Tumblr page, Andrew Winistorfer of Prefix magazine wrote that Wainwright is imagined on Mark Ronson's Tumblr as though he belonged to the Rat Pack, a "slick crooner with some old-timey backing music". Winistorfer felt "Out of the Game" was a more accurate of Wainwright's description of the album as being "pop music". The Huffington Post's Mallika Rao complimented both "Montauk" and "Out of the Game" prior to the album's release.

In the April 2012 issue of German Rolling Stone magazine reviewer Arne Willander concluded about the album: "The sheer brilliance leaves us exhausted: We have listened to a genius."

== Track listing ==
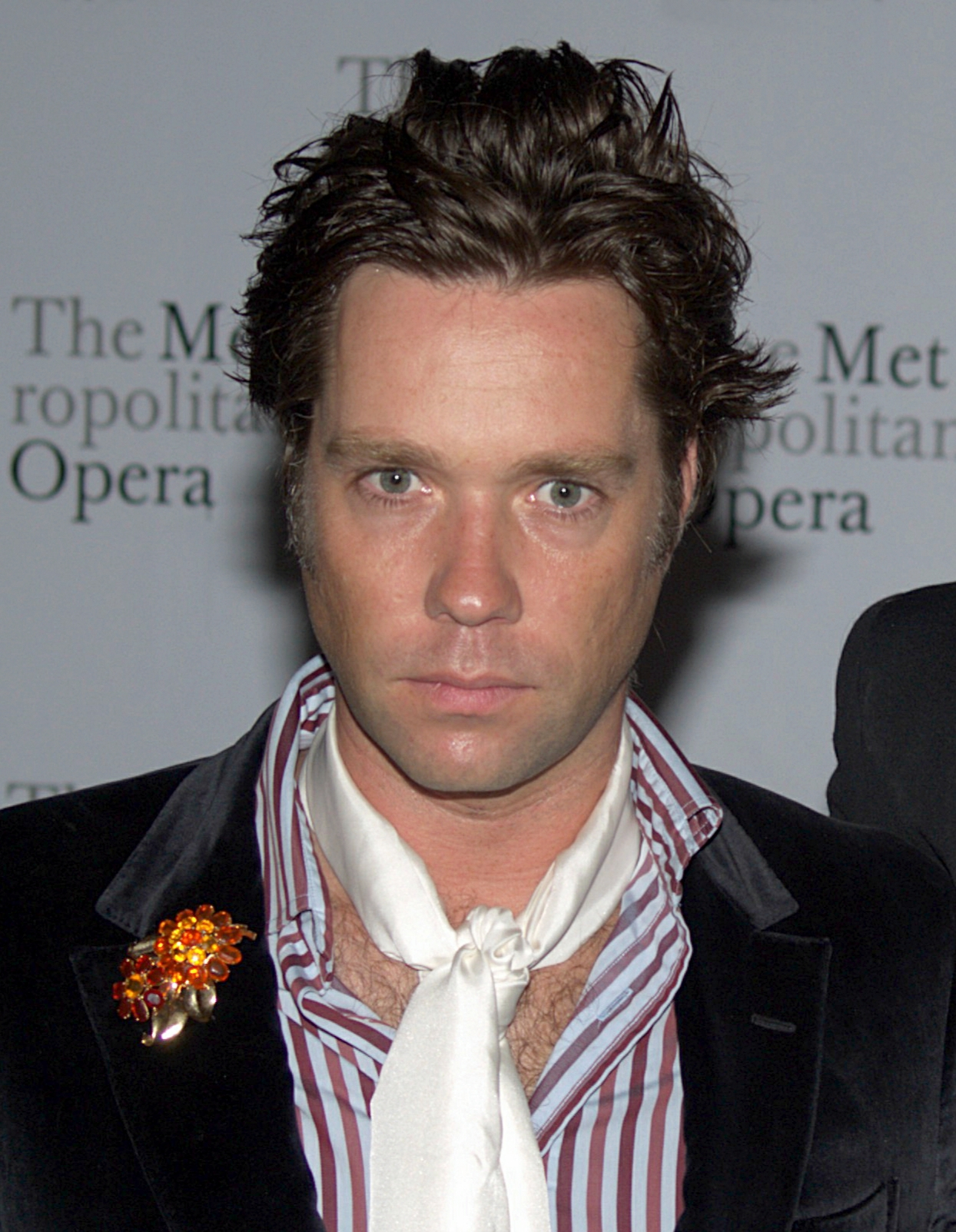
Rufus Wainwright in 2010

All tracks written by Rufus Wainwright.

1. "Out of the Game" – 4:06
2. "Jericho" – 3:44
3. "Rashida" – 3:00
4. "Barbara" – 3:56
5. "Welcome to the Ball" – 3:26
6. "Montauk" – 3:57
7. "Bitter Tears" – 3:32
8. "Respectable Dive" – 4:55
9. "Perfect Man" – 3:58
10. "Sometimes You Need" – 3:21
11. "Song of You" – 4:51
12. "Candles" – 7:42

iTunes bonus track

13. "WWIII" (co-written with Guy Chambers) – 3:56

== Personnel ==
- Alala – engineer
- Tom Arndt – release coordinator
- Victor Axelrod – organ, piano, synthesizer
- Ben Baptie – engineer, mixing assistant
- Jodie Barnes – stylist
- Pat Barry – creative director
- Thomas Bartlett – Fender Rhodes, organ, piano, synthesizer
- Charysse Blackman – backing vocals
- Angee Blake – backing vocals
- Stuart Bogie – tenor saxophone
- Thomas Brenneck – acoustic guitar, electric guitar, ukulele
- David Budge – drums
- Nels Cline – electric guitar
- Ross Cullum – A&R
- Rose Elinor Dougall – backing vocals
- Tom Elmhirst – mixing
- Ian Hendrickson-Smith – baritone saxophone
- Barry J. Holmes – photography
- Ted Jensen – mastering
- Joshua Blair – drum engineering
- Cheri Keating – groomer
- Kevin Keys – backing vocals
- Sean Lennon – acoustic guitar
- Michael Leonhart – cornet, flugelhorn, mellophone, trumpet
- Anna McGarrigle – accordion
- Vaughan Merrick – engineer, Pro-Tools
- Evelyn Morgan – A&R, production coordination
- Nick Movshon – bass guitar, drums, percussion
- Jenni Muldaur – backing vocals
- Al O'Connell – engineer, vocal engineer
- Julian Peploe – art direction, design
- Lucy Wainwright Roche – backing vocals
- Mark Ronson – bass guitar, drum programming, producer
- Anthony Rossomando – guitar
- Rutger – groomer
- Oliver Schrage – release coordinator
- Homer Steinweiss – drums
- Chaim Tannenbaum – backing vocals
- David Thomas – stylist
- Ted Tuthill – assistant
- Tina Tyrell – photography
- Loudon Wainwright III – backing vocals
- Martha Wainwright – backing vocals
- Rufus Wainwright – acoustic guitar, composer, piano, synthesizer, vocals
- Sloan Wainwright – backing vocals
- Andrew Wyatt – backing vocals
- Nick Zinner – electric guitar

== Charts ==
Immediately following release in the United Kingdom, the album earned a midweek position of number two, equaling the initial success of Wainwright's 2007 album Release the Stars and surpassing the peak position of his previous studio album All Days Are Nights: Songs for Lulu (2010).

Overall, Out of the Game charted in 17 countries, including top 10 positions in Denmark and the United Kingdom.

Chart (2012)	Peak position
Australian Albums (ARIA)	38
Austrian Albums (Ö3 Austria)	32
Belgian Albums (Ultratop Flanders)	26
Belgian Albums (Ultratop Wallonia)	78
Canadian Albums (Billboard)	11
Danish Albums (Hitlisten)	5
Dutch Albums (Album Top 100)	12
French Albums (SNEP)	99
German Albums (Offizielle Top 100)	22
Irish Albums (IRMA)	12
Italian Albums (FIMI)	67
Norwegian Albums (VG-lista)	29
Portuguese Albums (AFP)	17
Spanish Albums (Promusicae)	34
Swedish Albums (Sverigetopplistan)	43
Swiss Albums (Schweizer Hitparade)	59
UK Albums (Official Charts)	5
US Billboard 200	35
Scottish Albums (Official Charts)	7

== Release history ==
- Australia – April 20, 2012 (CD, deluxe edition, digital download)
- United Kingdom – April 23, 2012 (CD, deluxe edition, digital download, LP)
- Canada – April 24, 2012
- United States – May 1, 2012

Release history adapted from Wainwright's official site.

== See also ==
- Kate & Anna McGarrigle, duo consisting of Anna McGarrigle and Wainwright's mother, Kate McGarrigle
- Martha Wainwright discography
- Wilco discography
