= The Best of Rufus Wainwright =

2014 concert tour by Rufus Wainwright

- Tour by Rufus Wainwright
- Promotional poster for the March 25, 2014 concert at Divadlo Hybernia in Prague
- Location: Europe; United States
- Associated album: Vibrate: The Best of Rufus Wainwright
- Start date: March 4, 2014
- End date: April 27, 2014
- No. of shows: 26 in Europe; 5 in the United States; 31 total

Rufus Wainwright concert chronology
- Out of the Game Tour (2012–13); The Best of Rufus Wainwright (2014); Rufus in Concert (2016–17)

The Best of Rufus Wainwright was a concert tour by American-Canadian singer-songwriter Rufus Wainwright, in support of his greatest hits album, Vibrate: The Best of Rufus Wainwright (2014). The tour was announced on Wainwright's official website in December 2013, initially for 23 performances in more than 20 countries throughout Europe during March–April 2014. Subsequent dates were added in France, the United States and the United Kingdom, extending the number of concerts to 31. Wainwright's half-sister, Lucy Wainwright Roche, was the opening act for select dates.

== Development ==
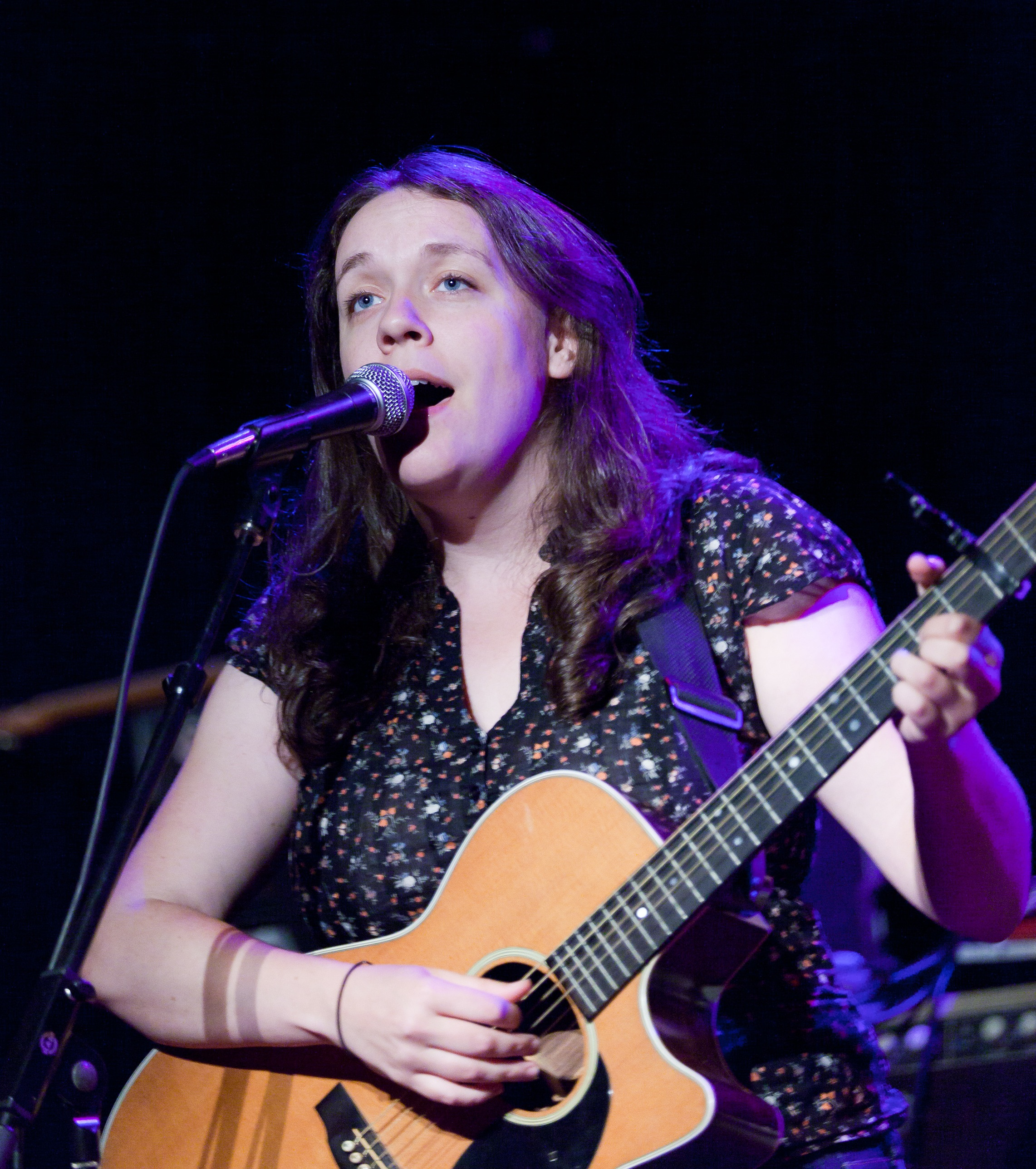
Wainwright's half-sister and tour opening act, Lucy Wainwright Roche, performing in 2010

On December 11, 2013, Wainwright's official website announced a 23-date "greatest hits" tour throughout Europe, during which Wainwright will perform in twenty countries in the months of March and April 2014. The tour, called "The Best of Rufus Wainwright", began on March 4 at Vicar Street in Dublin, Ireland. The second show, to be held the following day, took place at Usher Hall in Edinburgh, Scotland and was part of a commemoration of the musical heritage and history of the 100-year-old venue. Wainwright's performance at the Palladium in Riga will be his first in Latvia. His Zagreb concert will mark his second in Croatia.

On December 20, Wainwright's website announced that the tour would be extended to include two shows in France (April 23 and 25). On January 13, 2014, four additional concerts in the United States were announced in support of the album, extending the tour to 29 shows. Wainwright will perform in New York, Washington, D.C., Los Angeles and San Francisco, before returning to France and the United Kingdom. Due to popular demand, a second show was added at San Francisco's Palace of Fine Arts. On January 20, an additional performance was added in Coventry, United Kingdom, extending the tour to April 27.

Wainwright's half-sister, Lucy Wainwright Roche, was the opening act in Riga, Prague, Berlin, and Coventry.

== Tour dates ==
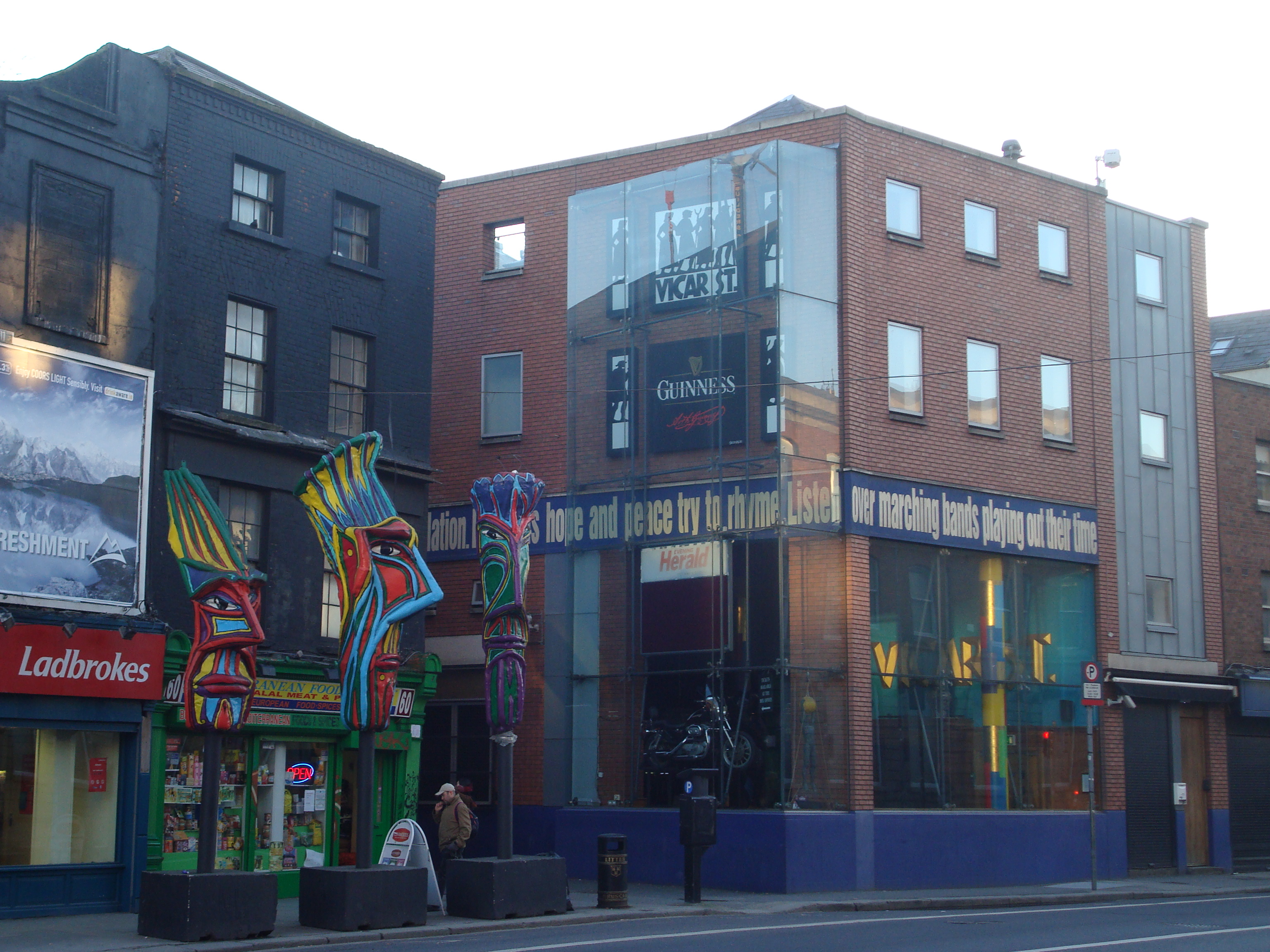
Wainwright's 25-date tour throughout Europe began with a performance at Vicar Street (pictured in 2010) in Dublin, Ireland.

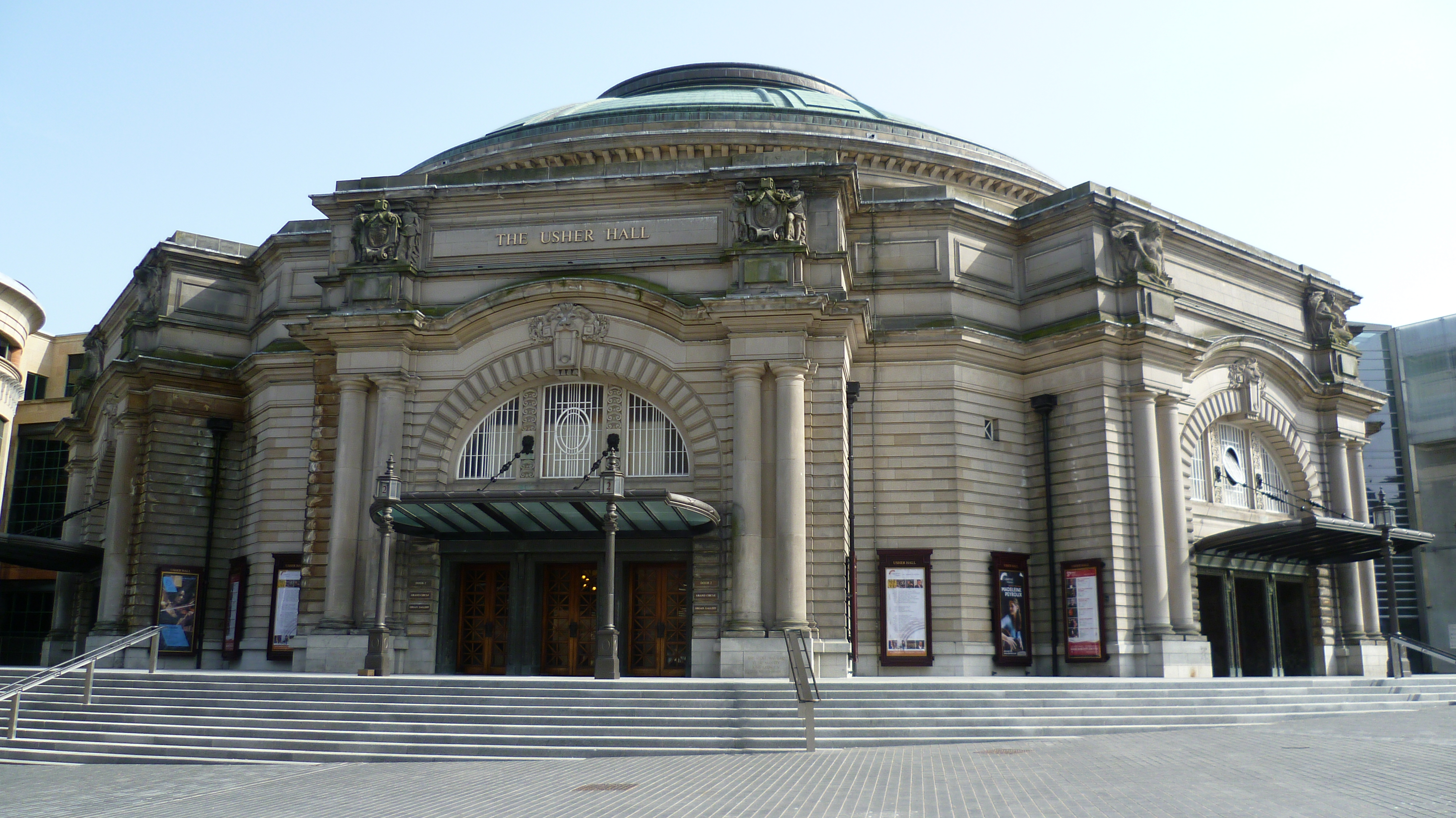
Wainwright's performance in Edinburgh commemorated the musical heritage and history of the 100-year-old Usher Hall (pictured in 2011).

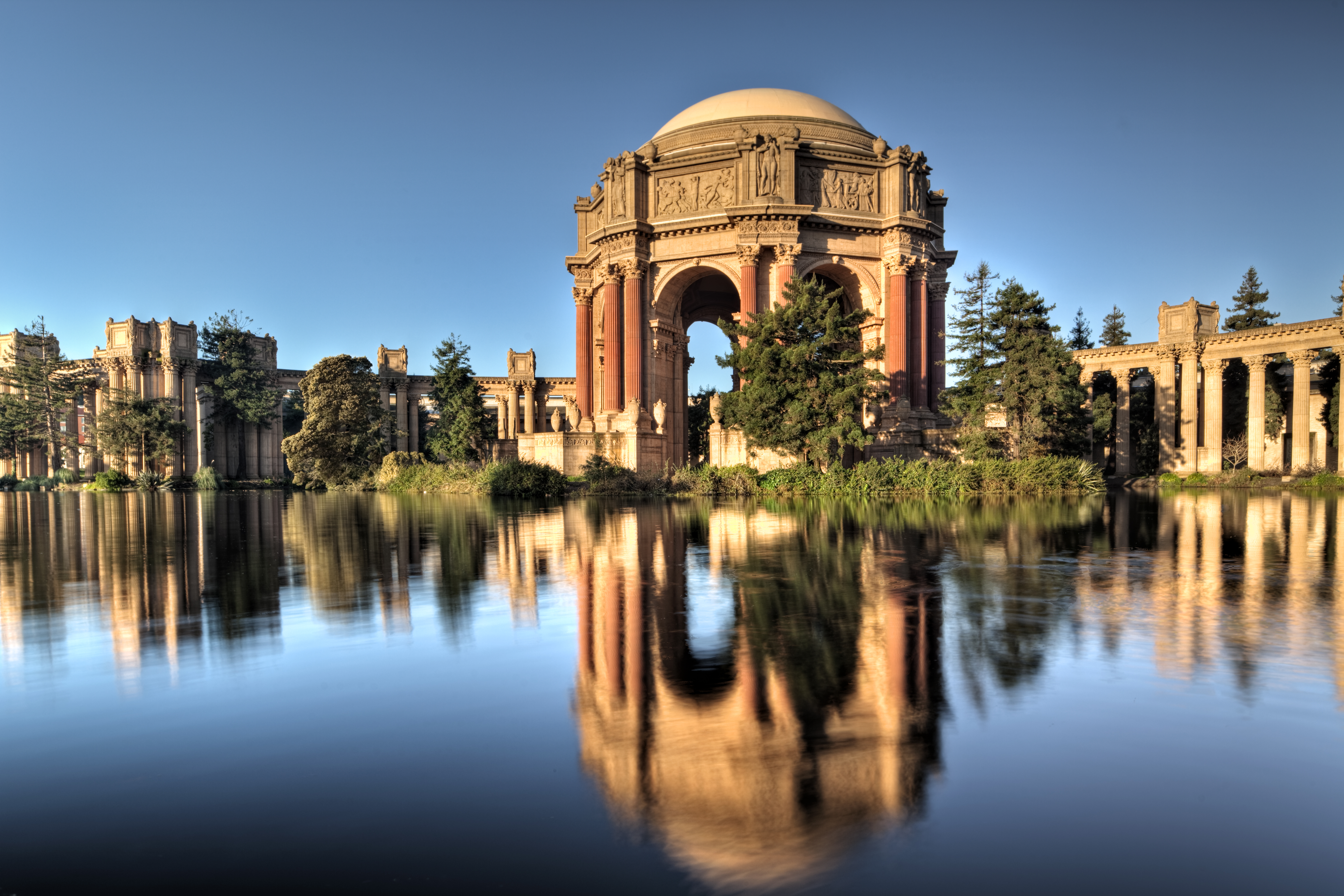
Wainwright performed twice at San Francisco's Palace of Fine Arts.

Date	City	Country	Venue
Europe
March 4, 2014	Dublin	Ireland	Vicar Street
March 5, 2014	Edinburgh	Scotland	Usher Hall
March 10, 2014	Amsterdam	Netherlands	Carré Theatre
March 12, 2014	Brussels	Belgium	Cirque Royale
March 13, 2014	Aarhus	Denmark	Musikhuset Aarhus
March 14, 2014	Stockholm	Sweden	Filadelfiakyrkan
March 15, 2014	Oslo	Norway	Sentrum Scene
March 17, 2014	Helsinki	Finland	Kulttuuritalo
March 19, 2014	Riga	Latvia	Palladium
March 20, 2014	Vilnius	Lithuania	Congress Hall
March 23, 2014	Wrocław	Poland	Capitol Musical Theatre
March 24, 2014	Warsaw	Poland	Palladium
March 25, 2014	Prague	Czech Republic	Divadlo Hybernia
March 26, 2014	Berlin	Germany	Apostel Paulus Kirche
March 28, 2014	Vienna	Austria	Museumsquartier (Hall E)
March 29, 2014	Ljubljana	Slovenia	Cankar Hall (Cankarjev dom)
March 31, 2014	Zürich	Switzerland	Volkshaus
April 2, 2014	Zagreb	Croatia	Vatroslav Lisinski
April 3, 2014	Budapest	Hungary	Palace of Arts (Budapest Spring Festival)
April 4, 2014	Brescia	Italy	Teatro Grande
April 6, 2014	London	England	Theatre Royal, Drury Lane
April 8, 2014	Bologna	Italy	Teatro Duse
April 10, 2014	Catania	Italy	Teatro Metropolitan
United States
April 15, 2014	New York City	United States	The Town Hall
April 16, 2014	Washington, D.C.	United States	Lincoln Theatre
April 18, 2014	Los Angeles	United States	Orpheum Theatre
April 19, 2014	San Francisco	United States	Palace of Fine Arts
April 20, 2014	San Francisco	United States	Palace of Fine Arts
Europe
April 23, 2014	Caen	France	Le Cargo
April 25, 2014	Paris	France	La Gaîté lyrique
April 27, 2014	Coventry	England	Warwick Arts Centre
