= April Fools (song) =

1998 song by Rufus Wainwright

- Cover art for US promotional CD single

Promotional single by Rufus Wainwright

from the album Rufus Wainwright
- Genre: Rock
- Length: 5:01
- Label: DreamWorks
- Songwriter: Rufus Wainwright
- Producer: Jon Brion

Music video
- "April Fools" on YouTube

"April Fools" is a song written and performed by American-Canadian singer-songwriter Rufus Wainwright. It originally appeared on his eponymous debut studio album, released by DreamWorks Records in May 1998. The song's music video was directed by Sophie Muller and features cameo appearances by Gwen Stefani and Melissa Auf der Maur.

"April Fools" appears on two other albums in Wainwright's discography—All I Want (2005) and Vibrate: The Best of Rufus Wainwright (2014)—as well as multiple compilation albums.

== Composition ==
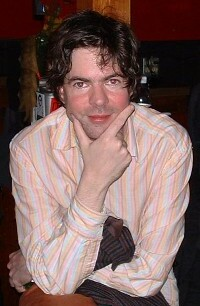
Jon Brion (pictured in 2004) produced "April Fools".

"April Fools" is a rock song written and performed by Wainwright. Produced by Jon Brion, the track features Wainwright's vocals and a "powerful" piano performance over a drum track by Jim Keltner. AllMusic's Matthew Greenwald described "April Fools" as "essentially a love song" that can be interpreted as being "about people in general, or a simple, two-person relationship". MTV's Kyle Anderson called the song "a bubbly little slice of cabaret rock that dances and swaggers". In a 2010 interview published by The Daily Telegraph, Wainwright said of the song and his songwriting process:

April Fools came to me when I was in the bath. I stood up naked and sang it. Songs come to me at odd times. The only thing they have in common is that, when they do come, the moment has to be theatrical."

During a 2020 interview with The San Diego Union-Tribune's David L. Coddon, Wainwright referred to "April Fools" as "one of [his] greatest possible hits".

== Recordings and live performances ==
"April Fools" originally appeared as the third track on Wainwright's eponymous debut studio album, released by DreamWorks Records in the United States on May 19, 1998. That same year, a shorter version of the song was released as a promotional single by the label. A live version of the song, from Wainwright's performance on KCRW, appears on the album Live on KCRW (1998). "April Fools" has appeared on other albums in Wainwright's discography, including the DVD All I Want, released by Universal International in 2005, and Vibrate: The Best of Rufus Wainwright, a greatest hits album released in 2014.

Compilation albums featuring "April Fools" include Basicbeats 101 (1998), CMJ New Music, Vol. 59 (1998), Everything Is Beautiful in Its Own Way (1998), Los Angeles Independent Film Festival: 1998 Music Sampler (1998), and Live at the World Cafe: Volume 9 (1999), which features a live recording of Wainwright's performance on WXPN's radio program World Cafe.

In August 2017, Wainwright performed the song as a duet as a large concert in Montreal in conjunction with "Montreal 375". Footage of the concert subsequently aired in September on the Canadian Broadcasting Corporation during a one-hour special called Montreal in Symphony.

== Music video ==
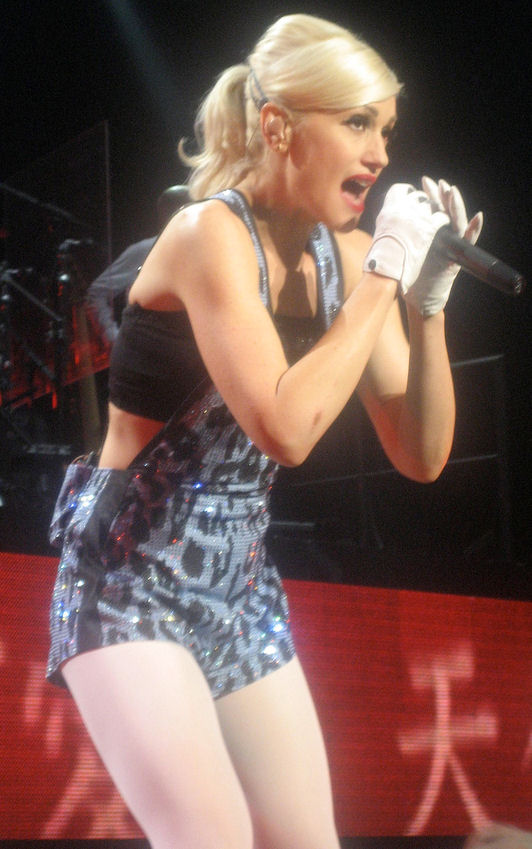
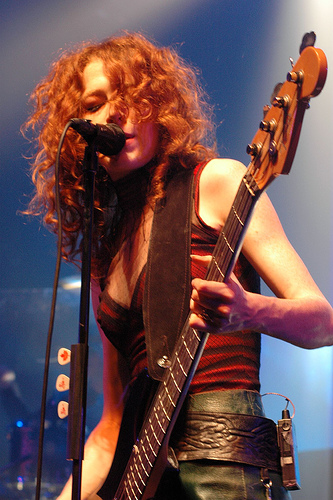
Gwen Stefani (top) and Melissa Auf der Maur (bottom) make cameo appearances in the song's music video, which was partly filmed in Stefani's house.

The music video for "April Fools", directed by Sophie Muller, was the first promoting Wainwright's debut album. It features the singer in Los Angeles "amidst a clique of classic opera characters" such as Madame Butterfly, attempting to prevent each of them from committing suicide or being murdered. However, in each instance he arrives too late. No Doubt's Gwen Stefani, a friend of Muller's, and Hole bassist Melissa Auf der Maur, a high school acquaintance and former roommate of Wainwright's, make cameo appearances. Part of the video was filmed in Stefani's house. Wainwright said of their involvement:

I grew up with Melissa, in Montreal. We went to high school together, we were actually in love, when we were young, but we never consummated, we were always too shy to get together. But I thought she was fascinating when I was a kid and I still think she's fascinating. So that was that connection. We lived together for a long time in L.A. right before we made the video, and Gwen [Stefani] was friends with the director Sophie Mueller [sic], and Gwen very graciously let us use her house, that's her house that it's filmed in, just cuz, whatever, she's a sweet, sweet girl.

== Reception ==
Matthew Greenwald of AllMusic described "April Fools" as "the most accessible song and recording" on the album, and "possibly one of the catchiest and most hook-filled choruses in contemporary pop memory". He wrote: "As with many of [Wainwright's] songs, the wordplay here keeps the listener's attention, making this one of the most unique singles of the modern pop era." Larry Flick, an editor for Billboard, selected the song as a "Critic's Choice", signifying a work that is "highly recommend[ed] because of their musical merit". He called it "sophisticated without being pretentious" and contrasted it with the "tight and tediously formulaic playlists" of the time. The song is included in Bruce Pollock's book Rock Song Index: The 7500 Most Important Songs for the Rock and Roll Era (2014).
