= Pullo Center =

Theater on the Penn State York campus in York, Pennsylvania, United States

Coordinates: 39.95131°N 76.70427°W

The Pullo Center is located in York, Pennsylvania, United States, on the Penn State York campus. The theatre has approximately 1,000 seats and hosts performances from concert to Broadway to comedy. The center can be rented for community functions. Organizations using it have included the York Youth Symphony Orchestra, York Junior Symphony, Dreamwrights, and Spring Garden Band.

In addition to housing the theatre, the building is home to Penn State York's Lee R. Glatfelter Library. In the atrium, just outside the main entrances to the library and theatre, is the Bistro at Penn State York. Classrooms on the lower level round out the contents of The Pullo Center. These classrooms are used by faculty and students throughout the year as additional classroom space on Penn State York's campus.

== History ==
Circa 1990, the City of York granted a deed of land containing approximately 30 acres (120,000 m^{2}) to the Penn State York Campus. The land was granted with the understanding that a performing arts venue would be erected for the community's enjoyment under the direction of Penn State. Fifteen years later, in August 2005, The Pullo Center officially opened its doors.

== Past performances ==
Among the performers who have appeared at Pullo Center are David Cook, Foreigner, Tracy Morgan, Rock of Ages, Key & Peele, Kongos, Black Violin, Rick Springfield, Carolina Liar, The 25th Annual Putnam County Spelling Bee, Cathie Ryan, The Drowsy Chaperone, Bob the Builder – Spud's Big Mess, Footloose, NBC's Last Comic Standing Live Tour, The Moscow Ballet's Great Russian Nutcracker, A Comedy of Errors, Gin Blossoms, Robin Spielberg, Simply Sinatra featuring Steve Lippia, Ring of Fire: The Music of Johnny Cash, Julius Caesar, Dirty Rotten Scoundrels, Top Secret: Battle for the Pentagon Papers, Go Diego Go, LIVE! The Great Jaguar Rescue, The Penn State Blue Band, The Curtis Symphony Orchestra, Rent, Livingston Taylor, Arthur Tricks the Tooth Fairy, The Producers, Lewis Black, Cirque Dreams, Thomas and Friends Live! On Stage, Clifford the Big Red Dog Live!, Tracy Lawrence, Mary Ann Winkowski "The Ghost Whisperer", Man of La Mancha, Jason Aldean, Barbie Live in Fairytopia, Big Bad Voodoo Daddy, Bob Saget, 42nd Street, Secondhand Serenade, Parachute, and The Rust.
