= Sing Me the Songs: Celebrating the Works of Kate McGarrigle =

2013 compilation album by various artists

Compilation album by Various artists
- Released: June 25, 2013
- Recorded: June 12, 2010; May 12–13, 2011; June 13, 2012
- Venues: Royal Festival Hall, London; Town Hall, New York City; Luminato, Massey Hall, Toronto
- Label: Nonesuch
- Producer: Joe Boyd

Various artists chronology
Tell My Sister (2011)	Sing Me the Songs: Celebrating the Works of Kate McGarrigle (2013)

Sing Me the Songs: Celebrating the Works of Kate McGarrigle is a two-disc compilation tribute album to Canadian singer-songwriter Kate McGarrigle, released by Nonesuch Records in June 2013.

The album features select songs from four concerts held in honor of McGarrigle, the Canadian Songwriters Hall of Fame member of the duo Kate & Anna McGarrigle who died of sarcoma in 2010. Following her death, a series of tribute concerts was organized by her children (singer-songwriters Rufus and Martha Wainwright) and her sister Anna in London, New York and Toronto.

Proceeds from the concerts helped to establish the Kate McGarrigle Foundation, a nonprofit organization which serves to fight sarcoma and preserve McGarrigle's artistic legacy; net proceeds from the album will also benefit the Foundation. Sing Me the Songs was produced by Joe Boyd, who also curated the tribute concerts.

== Background and promotion ==
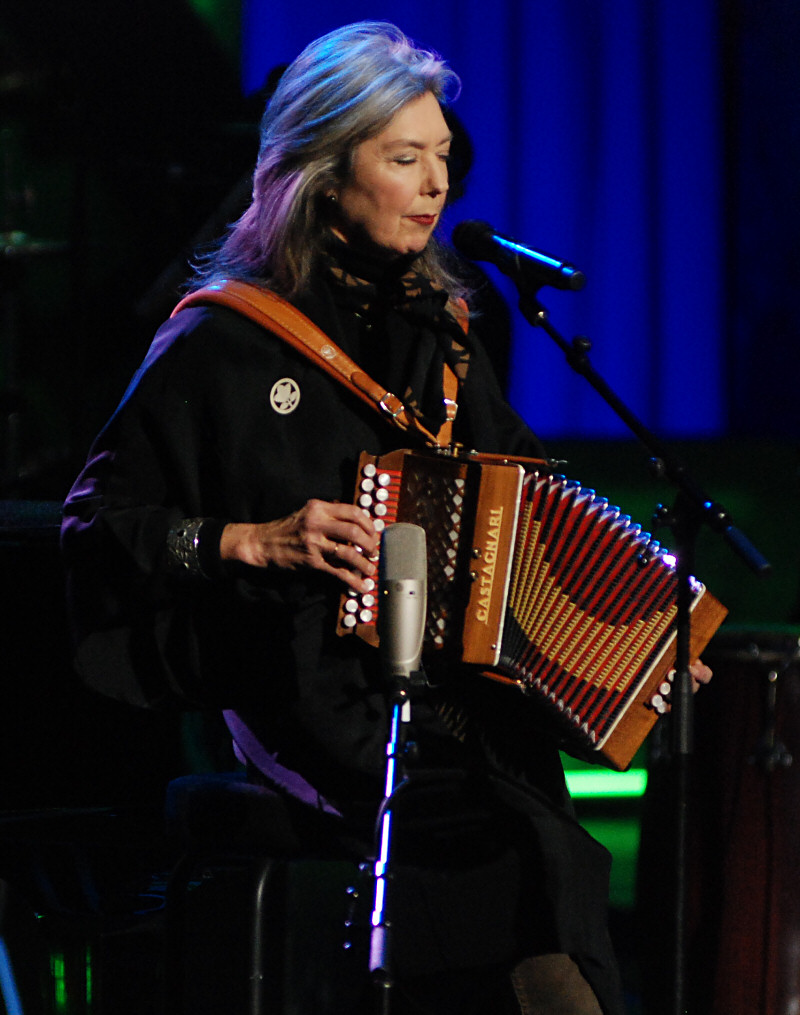
Kate McGarrigle in 2008

Following Kate McGarrigle's death in 2010 from sarcoma, her children Rufus and Martha Wainwright and her sister Anna McGarrigle organized a series of tribute concerts: June 12, 2010 at Royal Festival Hall in London, May 12–13, 2011 at Town Hall in New York City, and June 13, 2012, at Luminato in Massey Hall, Toronto. The London concert was commissioned and produced by Southbank Centre as part of Meltdown, an annual music festival curated by a different artist each year (Richard Thompson in 2010); Catherine Steinmann served as co-producer and Calum MacColl served as music director. Thompson said of the McGarrigle tribute at Meltdown, called "A Celebration of Kate McGarrigle":

I thought that because Kate McGarrigle died recently it would be wonderful to do a tribute evening. There was a wonderful response to it from the musicians who volunteered immediately to take part. The tickets sold out in about 11 minutes. Kate was an original. Her melodic sense is unique. No one sang like the McGarrigles. It was fantastic when her children, Rufus and Martha Wainright, started to have careers of their own. It wasn't a surprise. I had known the McGarrigle kids since they were tiny. Someone says "Hey, can you sing a harmony here?" or "Why don't you pick up a guitar?" so they start joining in and it leads one to believe there might be something genetic there after all; it's not just nurture, it might be nature.

The New York performances were produced by Absolutely Live Entertainment, Steinmann and Teddy Wainwright; Brad Albetta, Thomas Bartlett and MacColl served as music directors. The concert in Toronto was commissioned and produced by Luminato and recorded by the Canadian Broadcasting Corporation; Steinman and Teddy Wainwright served as co-producers and Albetta, Bartlett and MacColl again served as music directors.

Select songs from the four concerts in all three cities were used for the compilation album, Sing Me the Songs: Celebrating the Works of Kate McGarrigle. Joe Boyd curated the concerts and produced the album. The New York concerts were filmed for the documentary Sing Me the Songs That Say I Love You: A Concert for Kate McGarrigle, directed by Lian Lunson and co-produced by Lunson and Teddy Wainwright. Proceeds from the concerts helped to establish the Kate McGarrigle Foundation, a nonprofit organization which serves to fight sarcoma and preserve McGarrigle's artistic legacy; net proceeds from the album will also benefit the Foundation.

Sing Me the Songs That Say I Love You features interviews by McGarrigle's friends and family members, plus performances of her music. The film was screened at the Brooklyn Academy of Music (BAM) June 25, 2013 and was followed by a discussion panel with ensemble members, including Rufus and Martha. The film opened theatrically the following day at Film Forum in New York City. Also on June 26, 2013, BAM hosted a benefit concert called Kate's Kids at its Howard Gilman Opera House. Both events at BAM were benefits for the Kate McGarrigle Foundation.

== Critical reception ==
Professional ratings
Review scores
Source	Rating
AllMusic	3.5/5 stars
The Guardian	4/5 stars
The Independent	4/5 stars
The Irish Times	4/5 stars
MSN Music (Expert Witness)	A−
The New Zealand Herald	4.5/5

Sing Me the Songs received positive reviews from music critics. Robin Denselow of The Guardian found both the performers and the songs reminiscent of McGarrigle's creative breadth, as the exhibited "intense, personal lyrics" and "often exquisite melodies influenced by folk, country and hymns." The New Zealand Herald's Graham Reid said that McGarrigle's songs were fondly interpreted and cited highlights such as "Saratoga Summer Song", "Mother Mother", and "I Cried for Us". Joe Breen of The Irish Times wrote that younger performers such as Sloan and Martha Wainwright validate the album's worth, particularly on "Proserpina". Breen also highlighted the production of Joy Boyd, who "moulds the recording into a powerful exhibition of sustained catharsis and wonderful singing."

Allmusic's Thom Jurek called the album an occasionally uneven but "thoroughly engaging" affirmation of McGarrigle's distinctive artistry. In his review for MSN Music, Robert Christgau felt that the performance worked better as a show rather than as recorded music, but wrote that despite Rufus and Martha Wainwright's oversinging of McGarrigle's songs, "it's a hell of a songbook, and in the end it's the lesser material that fares worse, not the less experienced performers." Christgau found Anohni Hegarty's performance of "Go Leave" more moving than Richard and Linda Thompson's version, and cited "Travelling On for Jesus" as the next best song on the album.

== Track listing ==
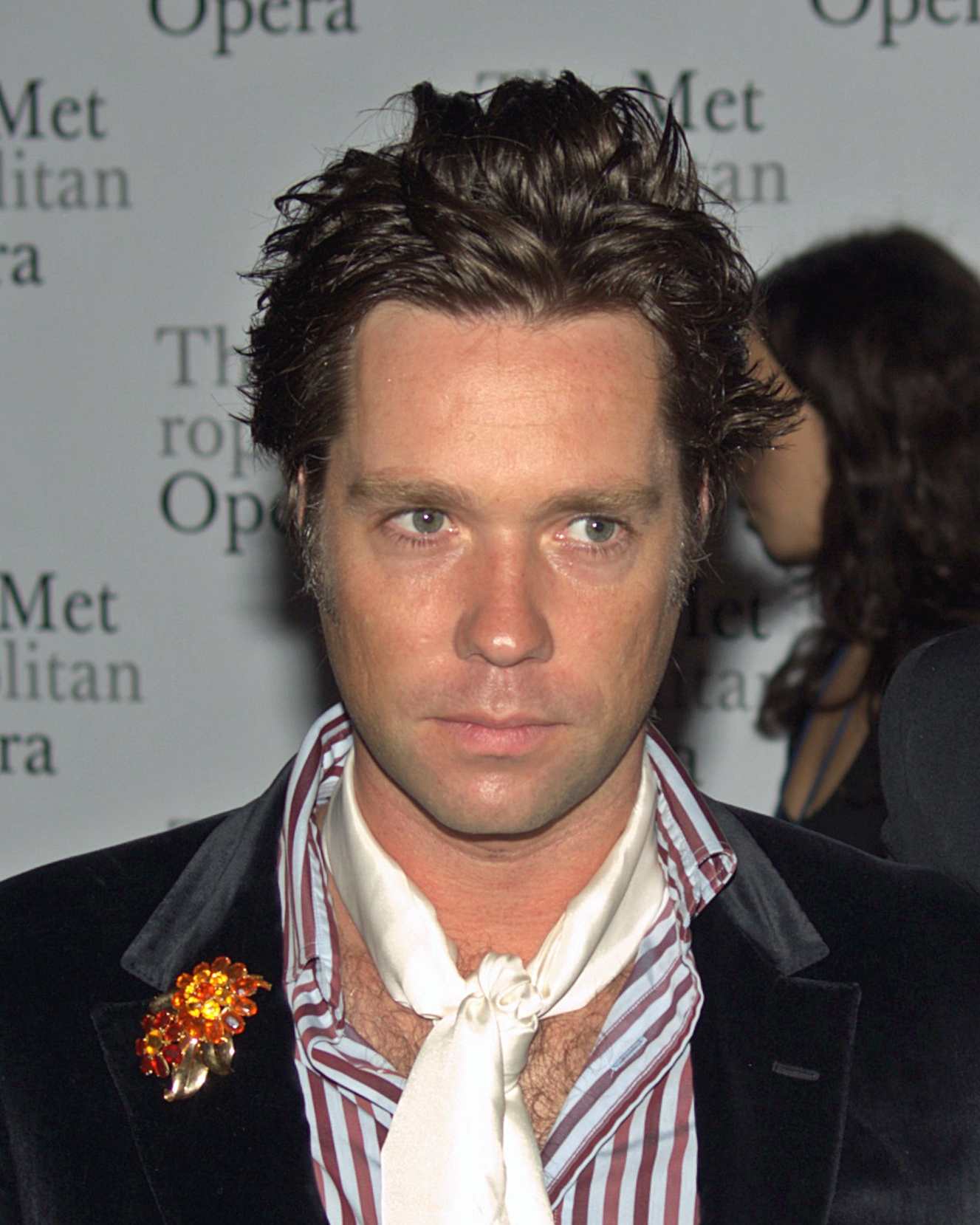
McGarrigle's son, Rufus Wainwright, in 2010

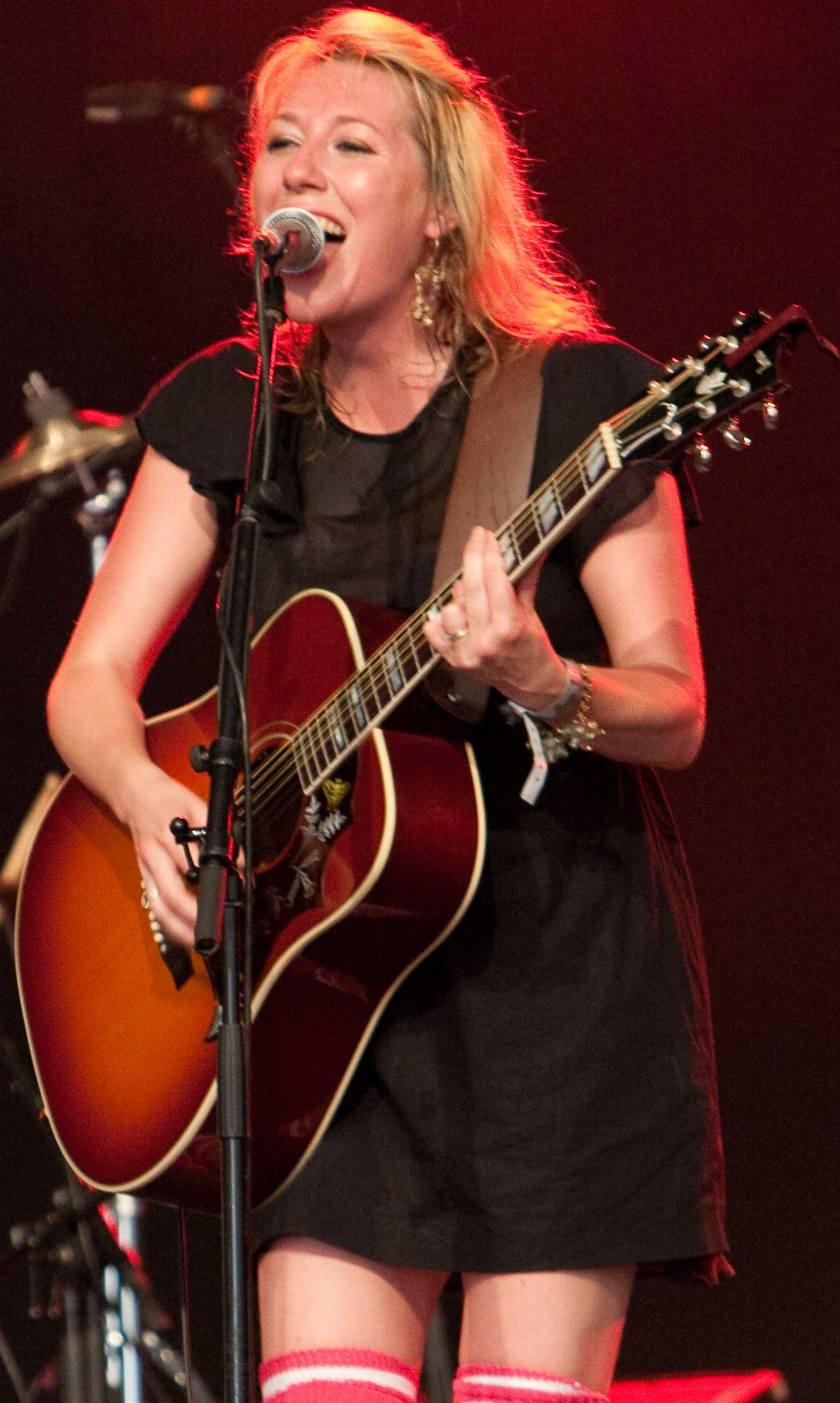
McGarrigle's daughter, Martha Wainwright, performing in 2008

The two-disc compilation album includes 34 tracks: 16 on the first disc, 18 on the second. All songs written by Kate McGarrigle, unless noted otherwise.

Disc one

1. "Kiss and Say Goodbye", performed by Rufus Wainwright, Anna McGarrigle, Martha Wainwright – 2:44
2. "Southern Boys", performed by Rufus Wainwright – 4:41
3. "(Talk to Me of) Mendocino", performed by Norah Jones – 3:19
4. "Entre Lajeunesse et la sagesse", performed by Rufus Wainwright, Anna McGarrigle, Emmylou Harris – 4:10
5. "Matapedia", performed by Martha Wainwright – 5:37
6. "I Eat Dinner", performed by Rufus Wainwright and Emmylou Harris – 4:22
7. "Swimming Song" (Loudon Wainwright III), performed by Jimmy Fallon – 2:47
8. "Saratoga Summer Song", performed by Teddy Thompson – 4:03
9. "Tell My Sister", performed by Martha Wainwright – 3:43
10. "I Don't Know", performed by Krystle Warren – 4:14
11. "First Born", performed by Rufus Wainwright and Martha Wainwright – 3:51
12. "Heart Like a Wheel" (Anna McGarrigle), performed by Emmylou Harris, Anna McGarrigle, Krystle Warren, Martha Wainwright, Lily Lanken – 3:47
13. "Go Leave", performed by Anohni – 4:15
14. "As Fast as My Feet Can Carry Me" (Anna McGarrigle, Chaim Tannenbaum), performed by Emmylou Harris and Norah Jones – 3:37
15. "Walking Song", performed by Rufus Wainwright – 5:26
16. "Proserpina", performed by Kate McGarrigle, Sloan Wainwright, Martha Wainwright – 4:51

Disc two

1. "I Am a Diamond" (Kate McGarrigle, Jane McGarrigle, Anna McGarrigle), performed by Martha Wainwright and Rufus Wainwright – 4:30
2. "Mother Mother", performed by Broken Social Scene – 3:41
3. "On My Way to Town", performed by Anna McGarrigle, Sylvan Lanken, Lily Lanken – 2:44
4. "Over the Hill" (Loudon Wainwright III, Kate McGarrigle), performed by Norah Jones with Lily Lanken – 3:02
5. "I Cried for Us", performed by Rufus Wainwright and Antony – 3:21
6. "The Work Song", performed by Justin Vivian Bond – 3:48
7. "Come Back Baby", performed by Jenni Muldaur – 3:38
8. "Oliver", performed by Rufus Wainwright – 1:47
9. "Dans le silence" (Anna McGarrigle, Kate McGarrigle, Philippe Tatartcheff), performed by Robert Charlebois and Anna McGarrigle – 4:07
10. "Jacques et Gilles", performed by Anna McGarrigle and Lily Lanken – 4:33
11. "All the Way to San Francisco", performed by Martha Wainwright – 4:19
12. "Tell My Sister", performed by Peggy Seeger – 3:39
13. "Travelling on for Jesus" (traditional; arranged by Kate McGarrigle), performed by Chaim Tannenbaum – 3:15
14. "Go Leave", performed by Linda Thompson with Richard Thompson (guitar) – 3:48
15. "Darlin' Kate" (Emmylou Harris), performed by Emmylou Harris – 3:17
16. "Dink's Song" (traditional), performed by Anna McGarrigle, Chaim Tannenbaum, Lily Lanken, Rufus Wainwright, Martha Wainwright – 4:04
17. "Love Over and Over" (Anna McGarrigle, Kate McGarrigle), performed by Ensemble – 4:18
18. "I Just Want to Make It Last", performed by Kate McGarrigle – 2:25

Track listing adapted from Nonesuch Records.

== Personnel ==
Joel Zifkin in 2009

Royal Festival Hall, London, June 12, 2010 (Disc 1, Tracks 5–6; Disc 2, Track 14)

- Brad Albetta – bass
- Martyn Barker – drums
- Thomas Bartlett – piano
- Calum MacColl – guitar, music director
- Catherine Steinmann – co-producer
- Chaim Tannenbaum – banjo, mandolin
- Joel Zifkin – violin

Town Hall, New York City, May 12, 2011 (Disc 1, Tracks 2–4, 7, 11, 13–14, 16; Disc 2, Tracks 1, 3, 5–7, 15–17) and May 13, 2011 (Disc 1, Tracks 1, 9–10, 12, 15; Disc 2, Tracks 4, 13)

- Brad Albetta – bass
- Thomas Bartlett – piano
- Bryan Devendorf – percussion
- Calum MacColl – guitar
- Jane McGarrigle – piano
- Michel Pépin – guitar
- Chaim Tannenbaum – banjo, mandolin
- Doug Weiselman – clarinet, guitar, saxophone
- Joel Zifkin – violin, bass

Luminato, Massey Hall, Toronto, June 13, 2012 (Disc 1, Track 8; Disc 2, Tracks 2, 8–12)

- Brad Albetta – bass
- Thomas Bartlett – piano
- Michelle Josef – drums
- Calum MacColl – guitar
- Jane McGarrigle – piano
- Michel Pépin – guitar
- Chaim Tannenbaum – banjo, mandolin
- Joel Zifkin – violin, bass

Credits adapted from Nonesuch Records.

== See also ==
- List of Nonesuch Records artists
- List of tribute albums
- Nonesuch Records discography
