= Entre la jeunesse et la sagesse =

- Entre la jeunesse et la sagesse LP cover (Kébec-Disc)

Studio album (a.k.a. French Record) by Kate & Anna McGarrigle
- Released: May 1980
- Recorded: 1975–1980
- Genre: Folk
- Length: 36:10
- Label: Kébec-Disc; Hannibal
- Producer: Kate & Anna McGarrigle

Kate & Anna McGarrigle chronology
Pronto Monto (1978)	Entre la jeunesse et la sagesse (1980)	Love Over and Over (1982)

Alternative cover
- French Record; LP cover (Hannibal)

Professional ratings
Review scores
Source	Rating
AllMusic	3/5 stars

Entre la jeunesse et la sagesse is the fourth album by Kate & Anna McGarrigle, released in 1980. Consisting entirely of songs in French, the album was initially available only in Canada. The subsequent international release was simply called French Record.

The title of the first track is a pun: Lajeunesse is a street name in Montreal, Quebec but, since la jeunesse means youth and la sagesse means wisdom, the title of the album means "between youth and wisdom".

== Critical reception ==
In his review in Melody Maker, Colin Irwin wrote: "I love French Record. I'm intoxicated by its shambling nonchalance; I'm seduced by its gentle, subtle nuances; and I'm in gleeful awe of its absolute, uncalculating disregard for the dictates of current style and influence. [...] It exudes such an enchanting atmosphere that it doesn't matter that you can't understand a damn thing they're on about (though translations are supplied on the sleeve). [...] It's a collection that swamps you in its sheer romance; yet stealthily avoids the danger of being dragged into slush by the discreet arrangements and surprisingly broad array of styles within the sentiment. [...] The music contains such a depth of feeling and emotion, it's obviously a work Kate and Anna have had in their hearts for a long time. [...] Ultimately, it's those harmonies that grab you tightest... joyful, mournful, bright, dour... no studio effect on Earth can communicate the disparate highs and lows of human emotion as eloquently as the bare voices of these two girls. You don't need to be a Frenchman to be convinced of that."

In his review in Rolling Stone, Don Shewey stated: "All [tracks] boast the tunefulness, instant familiarity and (judging from the characteristically whimsical liner notes) intelligently emotional subject matter for which the McGarrigles are known and loved. Fortunately, their usual spicy folk instrumentation remains intact. [...] "Unexpectedly, singing in French inspires the McGarrigles, especially Anna, to new levels of passion. The author of "Heart Like a Wheel" (which Linda Ronstadt made famous), Anna has generally sung in a wistfully frail soprano. But on French Record, particularly in "Mais Quand Tu Danses" and "Excursion à Venise," she reveals a large, gutsy, even guttural voice that's a pleasure to discover. [...] Nearly all the songs, whether by Kate or Anna, are collaborations with Canadian poet Philippe Tatartcheff. Most are distinctive for their offhand imagery and dry wit. [...] It's good to have the mischievous McGarrigles back!"

In his review in Folk Roots magazine, Lawrence H. Heath stated: "French Record was put on Earth to be enjoyed, to be delighted in [...]. It's just two French-Canadian sisters with heaven-sent voices and heartfelt harmonies, singing melodies that could move mountains to tears in the company of musicians whose empathy is exceeded only by their sureness of touch. [...] It's just the best album Kate and Anna McGarrigle have made to date, that's all (and everything!) [...] French Record is one of those rare albums without a single duff track — or nanosecond for that matter."

== Release history ==
Entre Lajeunesse et La Sagesse
- Entre Lajeunesse et la sagesse CD cover (La Tribu)

Studio album (a.k.a. French Record) by Kate & Anna McGarrigle
- Released: 2003
- Label: La Tribu

The album was released on vinyl LP with two different covers: the first by Kébec-Disc in Canada, titled Entre la jeunesse et la sagesse [sic] in May 1980, and the second by Hannibal Records in the rest of the world, titled simply French Record, in February 1981.

it was re-released on CD in 2003 by La Tribu, with both French Record and Entre Lajeunesse et la sagesse [sic] appearing in the title, and on the same cover as the original Hannibal LP.

== Overview ==
The album comprises eleven songs, including three that had been released on earlier albums:

- "Complainte pour Ste-Catherine", on Kate & Anna McGarrigle (1976)
- "Naufragée du tendre", on Dancer with Bruised Knees (1977); this is a new, re-recorded version of the song
- "Prends ton manteau", on Pronto Monto (1978).

== Track listing ==
Most of the songs were co-written by the McGarrigle sisters with Philippe Tatartcheff, in various combinations.

1. "Entre Lajeunesse et la sagesse" (Kate McGarrigle, Philippe Tatartcheff) – 4:28
2. "Complainte pour Ste. Catherine" (Anna McGarrigle, Philippe Tatartcheff) – 2:47
3. "Mais quand tu danses" (Anna McGarrigle, Philippe Tatartcheff) – 3:50
4. "Cheminant à la ville" (Kate McGarrigle, Philippe Tatartcheff) – 2:13
5. "Excursion à Venise" (Anna McGarrigle, Philippe Tatartcheff) – 4:26
6. "En filant ma quenouille" (Traditional; arranged by Kate & Anna McGarrigle) – 2:00
7. "La belle s'est étourdie" (Kate & Anna McGarrigle) – 3:20
8. "Naufragée du tendre" (Anna McGarrigle, Philippe Tatartcheff) – 3:40
9. "Avant la guerre" (Anna McGarrigle, Philippe Tatartcheff) – 3:59
10. "À Boire" (Anna McGarrigle, Philippe Tatartcheff) – 2:36
11. "Prends ton manteau" (Kate & Anna McGarrigle, Philippe Tatartcheff) – 2:51

== Personnel ==
- Kate McGarrigle - piano, Hammond B3 organ, accordion, acoustic guitar, banjo, vocals
- Anna McGarrigle - piano, accordion, vocals
- Jane McGarrigle - Hammond B3 organ
- Chaim Tannenbaum, Joel Topp - Harmonium
- Alun Davies - acoustic guitar
- Scott Lang - acoustic guitar, electric guitar, rhythm guitar
- David Spinozza - electric guitar
- Andrew Gold - electric guitar
- Gregg Prestopino - electric guitar
- Jorn Reissner - electric guitar, slide guitar
- Andrew Cowan - electric guitar, tambourine
- Peter Weldon - banjo
- Pat Donaldson - bass
- Tony Levin - bass - ("Complainte pour Ste-Catherine")
- Freebo - bass
- Jay Ungar, Floyd Guilbeau - Violins
- Gerry Conway - drums (Note: There is confusion in the sources about the spelling of the first name of the drummer who played on the tracks "Cheminant à la ville" and "Avant la Guerre". The sleeve notes of both the LP and the later CD refer to 'Jerry Conway', as does the credit entry at allmusic.com. However, Dane Lanken's book Kate and Anna McGarrigle Songs and Stories shows a photograph, on page 83, with the caption: "Just offstage at Kew Gardens, Toronto, August 1985 [...]. John Reissner (guitar), Pat Donaldson (bass), Gerry Conway (drums) and Joel Zifkin (violin) are in the lineup with Kate, Jane and Anna. Gerry, an old band made of Pat's from English folk-rock days, drummed with Kate and Anna through much of the 1980s.")
- Gary Moore - drums
- Steve Gadd - drums
- Densil Lang - percussions
- George Boham - brass
- Roger Walls - trumpet
- Carlyle Miller - saxophone
- Gary Nagels - trombone
