= Kate McGarrigle =

Canadian singer-songwriter (1946–2010)

Kate McGarrigle CM
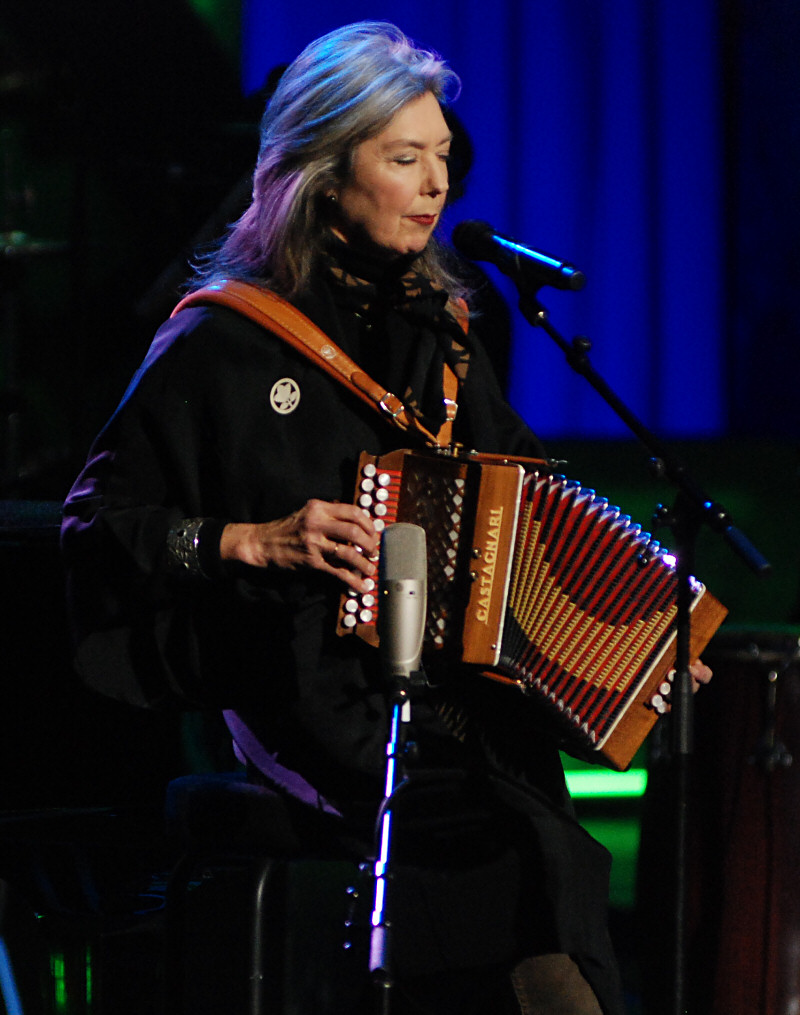
- McGarrigle at the 2008 Canadian Songwriters Hall of Fame gala

Background information
- Born: Catherine Frances McGarrigle; February 6, 1946; Montreal, Quebec, Canada
- Died: January 18, 2010 (aged 63) Montreal, Quebec, Canada
- Genres: Folk
- Occupations: Musician, singer-songwriter
- Instruments: Vocals; accordion; banjo; fiddle; guitar; piano
- Years active: 1970–2009
- Website: mcgarrigles.com

Kate McGarrigle CM (February 6, 1946 – January 18, 2010) was a Canadian folk music singer-songwriter, who wrote and performed as a duo with her sister Anna McGarrigle.

She is the mother of singers Rufus Wainwright and Martha Wainwright from her marriage to American singer-songwriter Loudon Wainwright III, which ended in divorce.

== Early life ==
Born in Montreal, Quebec, to Irish pianist Francis McGarrigle and French Canadian mother Gabrielle Latrémouille, the three McGarrigle sisters (Jane, Anna, and Kate, the youngest) grew up in the village of Saint-Sauveur-des-Monts, north of Montreal. Their family was a musical one on both sides, often gathering around the piano and singing, allowing Kate and her sisters to absorb influences as varied as Gershwin, French Canadian folk songs, Stephen Foster, and composer-singers such as Wade Hemsworth and Edith Piaf. The sisters were formally introduced to music by taking piano lessons from the village nuns.

== Career ==
In the 1960s, Kate and Anna established themselves in Montreal's burgeoning folk scene while they attended school. From 1963 to 1967, they teamed up with Jack Nissenson and Peter Weldon to form the folk group, the Mountain City Four.

Anna, who is 14 months older than Kate, studied painting at the École des Beaux-Arts de Montréal (now part of the Université du Québec à Montréal) in Montreal; McGarrigle studied engineering at McGill University. It was at this time that they began writing songs. Although she sang mostly in English, according to Juan Rodriguez, she and Anna "put Québécois folk music...on the global music map in 1980 [sic] with Complainte pour Ste. Catherine, Entre la jeunesse et la sagesse (commonly known as the French Record) and 2003's La vache qui pleure."

The McGarrigle sisters' life has been chronicled in a book by Anna's husband, Dane Lanken, titled Kate and Anna McGarrigle: Songs and Stories.

Place Kate-McGarrigle was inaugurated on August 7, 2013, in Montreal's Outremont borough. It contains a sculpture by Robert Wilson in the form of a double chair. McGarrigle—a Montreal native—lived nearby before her death.

Her son, Rufus, says he discussed with McGarrigle the offer of his childhood friend, Lorca Cohen, for Rufus to father her child. He says that McGarrigle strongly encouraged him to accept Cohen's offer, and that he regrets she didn't live long enough to see his daughter Viva Katherine Wainwright Cohen's birth.

== Awards ==
Kate and Anna's 1976 self-titled debut album was chosen by Melody Maker as Best Record of the Year. Their albums Matapedia (1996) and The McGarrigle Hour (1998) won Juno Awards. In 1999, Kate and Anna received Women of Originality awards. In 1993, she was made a Member of the Order of Canada.

In 2006, Kate and Anna McGarrigle were the recipients of the Lifetime Achievement Award at the SOCAN Awards.

== Death ==
McGarrigle was diagnosed with cancer in 2006 and established the Kate McGarrigle Fund at the McGill University Health Centre, which she set up in 2008 to raise awareness of sarcomas, a rare form of cancer that most often affects soft tissues.

She died of a sub-type of sarcoma called clear-cell sarcoma on January 18, 2010, at age 63, at her home in Montreal. Her sister Anna wrote on their website:

"Sadly our sweet Kate had to leave us last night. She departed in a haze of song and love surrounded by family and good friends. She is irreplaceable and we are broken-hearted. Til we meet again dear sister."

She made her last public appearance, with Rufus and Martha Wainwright, at the Royal Albert Hall in London, just six weeks before her death. The show raised $55,000 for the Kate McGarrigle Fund.

On June 12, 2010, the Meltdown Festival staged a tribute concert in her honour, organised by Richard Thompson. The concert included performances by her daughter Martha Wainwright, son Rufus Wainwright, sister Anna McGarrigle, ex-husband Loudon Wainwright III, Neil Tennant, Nick Cave, Emmylou Harris, Richard and Linda Thompson, and longtime friends and musical collaborators Chaim Tannenbaum and Joel Zifkin. Her close friend Emmylou Harris wrote the song "Darlin' Kate" in her memory, which appears on her album Hard Bargain.

A "Celebration of Kate McGarrigle" was held on May 12 and 13, 2011, at New York City's Town Hall. Among the participating artists honoring her at these concerts were Martha Wainwright, Rufus Wainwright, Anna McGarrigle, Emmylou Harris, Lisa Hannigan, Norah Jones, Antony Hegarty, Jimmy Fallon, Krystle Warren, Justin Vivian Bond, Teddy Thompson, Jenni Muldaur, writer Michael Ondaatje and longtime friends and McGarrigle sidemen Chaim Tannenbaum and Joel Zifkin. The celebration was curated by Joe Boyd and filmed by Lian Lunson. Sing Me the Songs That Say I Love You: A Concert for Kate McGarrigle was released in June 2013; Sing Me the Songs: Celebrating the Works of Kate McGarrigle served as the film's soundtrack.

== Discography ==
- Kate & Anna McGarrigle (1976)
- Dancer with Bruised Knees (1977)
- Pronto Monto (1978)
- Entre la jeunesse et la sagesse (1980)
- Love Over and Over (1982)
- Heartbeats Accelerating (1990)
- Matapédia (1996)
- The McGarrigle Hour (1998)
- La vache qui pleure (2003)
- The McGarrigle Christmas Hour (2005)
- Odditties (2010)
- Tell My Sister (2011)
- Sing Me the Songs: Celebrating the Works of Kate McGarrigle (2013)
- Tant Le Monde: Live in Bremen, Germany, 2005 (2022)
