= Odditties (Kate & Anna McGarrigle album) =

Compilation album by Kate & Anna McGarrigle
- Released: December 7, 2010 (Canada)
- Recorded: 1973–1990
- Genre: Folk
- Length: 38:34
- Label: Querbeservice

Kate & Anna McGarrigle chronology
The McGarrigle Christmas Hour (2005)	Odditties (2010)	Tell My Sister (2011)

Odditties (stylised as ODDiTTiES) is a compilation album released by Querbeservice in late 2010. It features unreleased versions of songs that Kate & Anna McGarrigle had recorded on analogue tapes for various projects between 1973 and 1990.

It was first released in Canada on December 7, 2010, and in the UK and Europe on April 11, 2011.

== Recording ==
The album includes the sisters' renditions of four songs written by Stephen Foster, two songs by Wade Hemsworth, one song by The Balfa Brothers, one traditional French song, one song that Kate McGarrigle wrote for her daughter Martha Wainwright, and three songs that Anna McGarrigle co-wrote with Chaim Tannenbaum, Audrey Bean and Carol Holland, respectively.

== Critical reception ==
In her review of the album for Now, Carla Gillis wrote: "To have 'The Log Driver's Waltz' on record, finally, is alone worth the price of this Kate and Anna McGarrigle compilation featuring long-lost tunes from 1973 to 1990. (...) The timing is, of course, significant. Kate passed away earlier this year, and you can't help but get choked up when the sisters sing Why should the beautiful die? in 'Ah May The Red Rose'. It all makes you pine for a proper box set, especially since the liner notes lack info about the tunes. (They do include a tender essay by Anna.) The good news is that Anna recently said Nonesuch has committed to releasing a reissue of their debut album plus some early demos and solo Kate work. Happy, happy, joy, joy."

Canadian music writer for Exclaim! Kerry Doole, commented: "Posthumous releases are, generally, annoyingly inferior, but this is definitely an exception. Apparently, the sisters had long planned such a compilation of songs recorded for various projects between 1973 and 1990, and it's finally surfaced, after the death of Canadian folk legend Kate McGarrigle. Scouring the archives has resulted in this lovely, varied collection. (...) The distinctive voices and harmonies of the sisters ― they could sing the Canadian tax code and still enchant ― are nicely captured throughout, but a little more information on who played on which tracks would have been appreciated. There's nothing odd about these ditties."

Sarah Coxson, reviewer for fRoots magazine, wrote: "Odditties offers another insight into the duo's musical journey: a rich array of much-loved McGarrigle songs selected and recorded for a variety of projects between 1973 and 1990. It documents both their broad-ranging taste – from "The Log Driver's Waltz" to the lo-fi delights of "A La Claire Fontaine" – and that fine line between vulnerability and strength that characterizes their vocals. Odditties is one for completists, a whimsical and welcome addition to any McGarrigles collection."

Music critic Robert Christgau stated: "A hodgepodge segmented to make sense as a sampler, all recorded by 1990 and most well before (...) All are worthy, two wondrous: Anna's threnody for her cat Louis, which is slight, and Kate's love song to Martha and her dolls, which is wiry. Play it for someone you love on Mother's Day. But be sure to check it out yourself first."

== Track listing ==
1. "Was My Brother in the Battle" (Stephen Foster, Kate & Anna McGarrigle) – 3:39
2. "Better Times Are Coming" (Stephen Foster, Kate & Anna McGarrigle) – 2:58
3. "Gentle Annie" (Stephen Foster, Kate & Anna McGarrigle) – 2:42
4. "Ah May The Red Rose" (Stephen Foster, Kate & Anna McGarrigle) – 1:32
5. "The Log Driver's Waltz" (Wade Hemsworth) – 2:48
6. "My Mother The Ocean Sea" (W. Hemsworth) – 4:15
7. "As Fast As My Feet" (Chaim Tannenbaum, Anna McGarrigle) – 3:58
8. "À la claire fontaine" (Traditional; arranged by Kate & Anna McGarrigle) – 3:37
9. "Parlez-nous à boire" (Balfa Frères) – 2:56
10. "Lullaby for a Doll" (Kate McGarrigle) – 4:19
11. "Louis the Cat" (A.E. Bean, Anna McGarrigle) – 2:16
12. "You Tell Me That I'm Falling Down" (C.S. Holland, Anna McGarrigle) – 3:21

== Personnel ==
- Anna McGarrigle and Kate McGarrigle, with: (Note: The sleeve notes do not provide details of instruments played, although additional notes about the songs are available at www.mcgarrigles.com, along with details of the instruments played by some of the musicians.)
- Gordon Adamson
- Audrey Bean
- Gerry Conway
- Andrew Cowan
- Pat Donaldson
- Michel Dupire
- Jody Golick
- Danny Greenspoon
- Dane Lanken
- Gilles Losier
- Jane McGarrigle
- Chaim Tannenbaum
- Rufus Wainwright
- Peter Weldon
- Joel Zifkin
