= La vache qui pleure (album) =

Studio album by Kate & Anna McGarrigle
- Released: November 2003
- Recorded: 2001–2003
- Genre: Folk
- Length: 40:31
- Label: La Tribu
- Producer: Michel Pépin, Borza Ghomeshi

Kate & Anna McGarrigle chronology
The McGarrigle Hour (1998)	La vache qui pleure (2003)	The McGarrigle Christmas Hour (2005)

La vache qui pleure is the ninth album by Kate & Anna McGarrigle, released in 2003. It is named after the prehistoric bas-relief (stone carving) of La vache qui pleure near Djanet in the south of Algeria which is pictured on the album cover. Its title La vache qui pleure (French for The crying cow) may also be a joke with the famous French cheese label La vache qui rit (The laughing cow).

It is the sisters' second full album of French songs, following on from their 1980 album Entre Lajeunesse et la sagesse, while several of their other albums also included a few French songs.

The album does include one English song, "Sunflower", which is a setting of William Blake's poem "Ah! Sunflower". The same song is performed in French ("Ah tournesol"), as a straight translation of the original. Blake's poem is not acknowledged in the credits for either song.

Guest musicians on the album include Joel Zifkin, Lily Lanken (Anna's daughter), and Martha Wainwright (Kate's daughter).

In 2005, the album was given a European release on the Munich label, and a twelfth track, "La complainte du phoque en Alaska" which was written originally by Michel Rivard for Beau Dommage a Montreal based band, was added. That version is currently out of print.

== Critical reception ==
Brendan Kelly, reviewer for Montreal Gazette, wrote on November 22, 2003: "La Vache qui pleure, like most McGarrigles albums, feels like it exists out of time. Some songs sound like they could have been recorded in the 1940s or yesterday."

In his review in The Guardian on April 15, 2005, Robin Denselow wrote: "This new set, with all but one song in French, is a nod to their French-Canadian roots. Kate plays guitars, banjo, piano and violin, Anna adds accordion and the occasional dash of synthesizer, and Martha helps out on harmonies. The production is more gutsy than in the past, the singing and playing are fine as ever, and the songs range from the thoughtful Ce Matin to Petites Boîtes, an unexpectedly refreshing reworking of the well-worn Little Boxes, the Malvina Reynolds song made famous by Pete Seeger."

Also on April 15, 2005, Andy Gill of The Independent wrote: "Presumably named in opposition to the synthetic connotations of the French processed cheese, La Vache Qui Pleure (Crying Cow) features folksy arrangements of Acadian fiddles, accordions and banjos, with the sisters' harmonies adding an Enya-esque gossamer quality to tracks such as "Petite Annonce Amoureuse" and "Sunflower (Ah Tournesol)", where the swelling and subsiding of the backing instruments is like the lapping of an ocean on a distant beach. There's a keen awareness of the plight of powerless outsiders, be they the homesick refugee of "Ce Matin", the natives of Michel Rivard's "La Complainte du Phoque en Alaska", lamenting the way their youngsters leave for the US, or the cow of the title-track, weeping for her lost calf. Most quirkily enjoyable is the reading of Malvina Reynolds' folk standard "Little Boxes (Petites Boites)", rendered as a lolloping cajun waltz of fiddle, accordion and guitars."

== Track listing ==
All songs by Kate & Anna McGarrigle and Philippe Tatartcheff, except where noted.

1. "Petite annonce amoureuse" – 3:58
2. "Ah tournesol" – 2:58
3. "Le bambocheur" (Kate McGarrigle) – 2:22
4. "Hurle le vent" – 3:22
5. "La Vache qui pleure" – 4:08
6. "Rose blanche" (Kate & Anna McGarrigle, Ph. Tatartcheff, A. Bruant) – 4:52
7. "Tant le monde" – 3:35
8. "Ce matin" – 4:43
9. "Dans le silence" – 3:32
10. "Petites boites" (translation of "Little Boxes" by Malvina Reynolds and Graeme Allwright) – 3:36
11. "Sunflower" (Kate & Anna McGarrigle) – 3:25
12. "La complainte du phoque en Alaska" (M. Rivard) – 6:03 (this song only appears on the 2005 Munich release)

== Personnel ==
- Kate McGarrigle – vocals, harmony vocals, banjo, piano, guitar, accordion, synthesized flutes, violin, drum
- Anna McGarrigle – vocals, harmony vocals, guitar, accordion, piano, banjar (seven strings banjo), synthesized flutes, synthesizer, keyboards, recorder, bass, omnichord, tambourine
- Michel Pépin – guitars, bass, mandolin, drums, percussion, harmonica, Hammond B3 organ
- Martha Wainwright – vocals, harmony vocals, Spanish guitar
- Michael Jerome Brown – slide guitar
- Jeff Hill – double bass, bass
- Frédéric Grenier – double bass
- Joel Zifkin – violin
- Butch – drums, percussions on "Ah Tournesol", "Tant Le Monde", "Sunflower"
- Marc Lessard – drums on "Rose Blanche"
- John McColgan – drums on "Petite Annonce Amoureuse", "Ce Monde", "Dans Le Silence"
- Marc-André "Boum Boum" Bellefleur – bass drums
- Daniel Thonon – hurdy-gurdy
- Lily Lanken – vocals, harmony vocals
- Philippe Tatartcheff – recitation on "Hurle le vent"
