= The McGarrigle Christmas Hour =

Studio album by Kate & Anna McGarrigle
- Released: November 1, 2005
- Recorded: 2004–2005
- Genre: Christmas
- Length: 52:34
- Label: Nonesuch
- Producer: Nicholas Hill, Rufus Wainwright

Kate & Anna McGarrigle chronology
La vache qui pleure (2003)	The McGarrigle Christmas Hour (2005)	ODDiTTiES (2010)

Professional ratings
Review scores
Source	Rating
AllMusic	3.5/5 stars

The McGarrigle Christmas Hour is the tenth and final studio album by Kate & Anna McGarrigle. The album was released in November 1, 2005. A sequel to their 1998 album The McGarrigle Hour, the album features a program of Christmas music recorded by the McGarrigles, their family, and several friends and collaborators. It was also the last album to be released by the duo before Kate died in 2010.

Performers on the album include Kate's son and daughter Rufus and Martha, Anna's husband Dane Lanken and their children Lily and Sylvan, and Kate and Anna's sister Jane, as well as Emmylou Harris, Chaim Tannenbaum, Pierre Marchand, Joel Zifkin, Brad Albetta, Teddy Thompson and Beth Orton.

The album was named number 21 in the 40 Essential Christmas Albums list by Rolling Stone.

== Track listing ==
The tracks chosen for the album are traditional Christmas carols or pop standards, although the participants also included several original Christmas-themed songs.

1. "Seven Joys of Mary" (Traditional) – 4:51
2. "Old Waits Carol" (Traditional) – 2:36
3. "O Little Town of Bethlehem" (Phillips Brooks, Lewis Redner) – 3:58
4. "Il est né/Ça berger" (Traditional) – 4:35
5. "What Are You Doing New Year's Eve" (Frank Loesser) – 3:02
6. "Rebel Jesus" (Jackson Browne) – 4:10
7. "Some Children See Him" (Alfred S. Burt, Wihla Hitson) – 3:56
8. "Merry Christmas and Happy New Year" (Martha Wainwright) – 4:07
9. "Counting Stars" (Ian Vincenzo Dow, Kate McGarrigle, Anna McGarrigle) – 3:19
10. "Spotlight on Christmas" (Rufus Wainwright) – 3:23
11. "Wise Men" (Kate McGarrigle, Anna McGarrigle) – 4:02
12. "Port Starboard Sox" (Pat Donaldson, Dane Lanken, Kate McGarrigle, Anna McGarrigle) – 3:27
13. "God Rest Ye Merry Gentlemen" (Traditional) – 3:27
14. "Blue Christmas" (Billy Hayes, Jay Johnson) – 3:36
