= Love Over and Over =

Love Over And Over

Studio album by Kate & Anna McGarrigle
- Released: 1982 (CD 1985)
- Recorded: Studio Morin Heights
- Genre: Folk
- Length: 35:06
- Label: Polydor
- Producer: Kate, Anna and Jane McGarrigle

Kate & Anna McGarrigle chronology
| Entre Lajeunesse et la sagesse (1980) | Love Over And Over (1982) | Heartbeats Accelerating (1990) |

Professional ratings
Review scores
| Source | Rating |
|---|---|
| AllMusic | 3/5 stars |
| Christgau's Record Guide | A− |
| Uncut | 4/5 stars |

Love Over and Over is the fifth album by Kate & Anna McGarrigle, released in 1982. Following this album, the McGarrigles did not release an album of new material until Heartbeats Accelerating in 1990. The album contains a French-Canadian version of Bob Seger's "You'll Accomp'ny Me".

== Track listing ==
=== Side One ===
1. "Move Over Moon" (Kate McGarrigle) – 3:11
2. "Sun, Son (Shining on the Water)" (Anna McGarrigle) – 4:03
3. "I Cried for Us" (Kate McGarrigle) – 3:23
4. "Love Over and Over" (Kate & Anna McGarrigle) – 4:07
5. "Star Cab Company" (Anna McGarrigle) – 3:30
6. "Tu vas m'accompagner" (Bob Seger; translated. by Anna McGarrigle) – 3:56

=== Side Two ===
1. "On My Way to Town" (Kate McGarrigle) – 2:17
2. "Jesus Lifeline" (Traditional, Arranged by Anna McGarrigle) – 3:01
3. "Work Song" (Kate McGarrigle) – 3:49
4. "St. Valentines Day, 1978 (Black Heart)" (Anna McGarrigle) – 3:17
5. "Midnight Flight" (Kate McGarrigle) – 5:42

=== Bonus tracks ===
The 1997 Hannibal CD reissue contains two bonus tracks not found on the Polydor release:

- "A Place in Your Heart" (Kate & Anna McGarrigle, Pat Donaldson, Dane Lanken, Jane McGarrigle) – 3:07
- "Babies If I Didn't Have You" (Kate McGarrigle) – 3:34 (B-side on the single release of the title track "Love Over and Over")

== Personnel ==
- Kate McGarrigle : Piano, banjo, accordion, guitar, vocals
- Anna McGarrigle : Piano, accordion, vocals
- Alun Davies : Guitar
- Andrew Cowan : Guitar
- Chaim Tannenbaum : Guitar, banjo, mandolin, vocals
- Mark Knopfler - Guitar on "Love Over and Over"
- Scot Lang : Guitar, bass guitar
- Pat Donaldson : Bass guitar
- Paul Samwell-Smith : Bass guitar
- Jane McGarrigle : Organ, vocals
- Kenny Pearson : Piano, organ
- Gilles Losier : Piano
- Dane Lanken : Trumpet
- Gerry Conway : Drums
- Jean-Paul Robichaud : Drums, percussions
- Ted Jensen : Engineer at Sterling Sound, NYC - mastering
