= Tommy Tricker and the Stamp Traveller =

1988 film by Michael Rubbo

- US VHS cover art
- Directed by: Michael Rubbo
- Written by: Michael Rubbo
- Produced by: Rock Demers
- Starring: Lucas Evans; Anthony Rogers; Jill Stanley; Andrew Whitehead; Chen Yuan Tao; Catherine Wright; Paul Popowich; Han Yun; Cree Rubbo; Rufus Wainwright
- Cinematography: Andreas Poulsson
- Edited by: André Corriveau
- Music by: Anna McGarrigle; Jane McGarrigle; Kate McGarrigle
- Production companies: Les Productions La Fête Inc. Telefilm Canada; China Film Group Corporation
- Distributed by: Cinéma Plus Distribution
- Release date: December 16, 1988
- Running time: 105 minutes
- Country: Canada
- Languages: English; Chinese
- Budget: C$3 million

Tommy Tricker and the Stamp Traveller (also known as Les aventuriers du timbre perdu in Quebec) is a 1988 Canadian urban fantasy adventure film written and directed by Michael Rubbo, and the seventh film in the Tales for All series produced by Les Productions la Fête. The film stars Lucas Evans, Anthony Rogers, Jill Stanley, Andrew Whitehead, Paul Popowich, and Rufus Wainwright in his film debut. The film follows a young boy named Ralph who, while trying to reobtain a stamp from the title character, discovers a method to magically travel by mail, and sets out to find the stamp collection of the mysterious Charles Merriweather.

Filming took place in Canada, China, and Rubbo's native Australia. The score was composed by Anna, Jane, and Kate McGarrigle. Kate's children, Rufus and Martha Wainwright, also perform original songs on the soundtrack.

A sequel, The Return of Tommy Tricker, was released in 1994.

== Plot ==
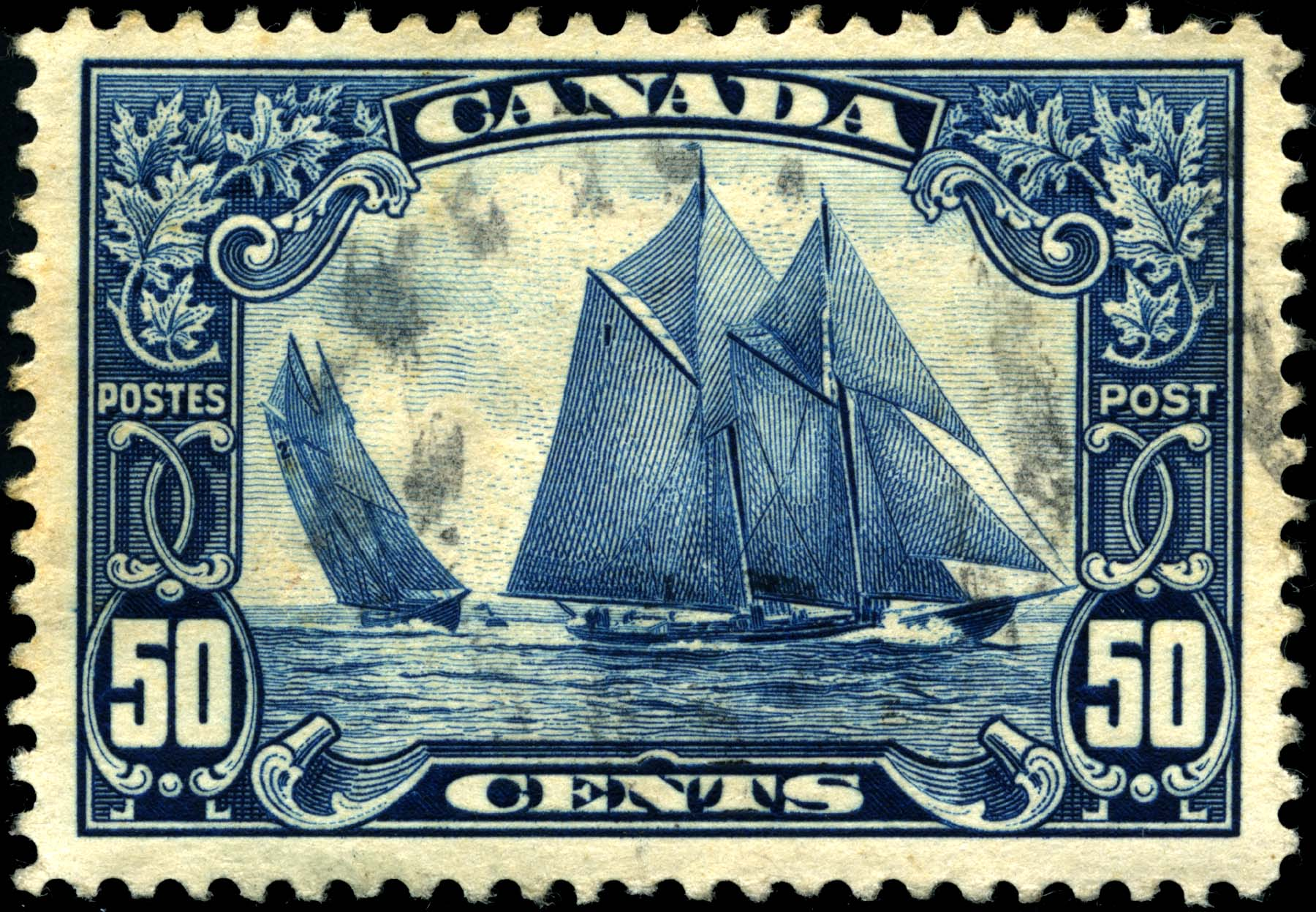
A Bluenose stamp similar to the one featured in the film.

Ralph James is a timid young stamp enthusiast living in Montreal who suffers from a stutter. One day, fellow schoolmate Tommy Tricker, a stamp trader and con artist, visits Ralph's house and offers him a collection of rare permanent stamps in exchange for a spare Bluenose, depicting a man on the ship's mast, belonging to Ralph's father. While hesitant at first, Ralph eventually gives in and makes the deal, only for Tommy to give him a different set of stamps and quickly make off with the Bluenose. Ralph's parents arrive home with Mr. Bronson, a visiting elderly stamp collector, but Ralph is hesitant to confront his father and hides out in the backyard guest house. Tommy exchanges the stamp for $300 at a stamp store, which he uses to buy groceries for his impoverished family.

Ralph and his sister Nancy, at her suggestion, visit the stamp store in an attempt to buy back the Bluenose, but are unable to afford it. Out of pity, the owners decide to give Nancy an old stamp album, which an elderly customer had given away prior, for free. At home, Ralph disregards Nancy's album as worthless and rips it up, only to uncover a hidden letter in the book's front. Joined by their friend and classmate Albert, Ralph and Nancy discover the book belonged to Charles Merriweather, an eleven-year old boy from 1913, and another letter hidden in the book's back cover reveals he hid a book with his true, priceless stamp collection in a stamp shop located in Sydney, Australia. The trio also discover a secret magic riddle that allows a person to shrink down and enter a stamp, allowing them to travel by mail. Ralph decides to set out and find Charles's collection, but unbeknownst to him, Tommy had overheard the trio, and he sets out to find the stamps as well.

The following morning, Tommy and his friend Cass separately try to steal the riddle from Ralph, Nancy, and Albert, to no avail. The trio then travel to the local park, where Ralph recites the riddle. This causes him to turn animated and shrink down, allowing him to enter a Mountie stamp on a letter addressed to the stamp shop in Australia. Nancy and Albert attempt to pick up the letter, but a force repels them both, forcing them to abandon Ralph. The duo lose track of the letter, which switches hands a few times - a child, a thief, a homeless man - before ending up, crumbled, with Tommy. At his home, Tommy detaches Ralph's stamp from the letter and reattaches it to a postcard, which he had stolen from Nancy prior, before mailing Ralph out.

The postcard is addressed to Chen Tow, a young boy in Hangzhou, China, and one of Nancy's pen pals. He knows about Ralph, as his classmate Mai Ling helps translate Nancy's postcards. Ralph exits the stamp and discovers where he is, to his dismay, later refusing to enter a new stamp as the city streets are too busy for him, which Mai Ling interprets as a lack of courage. Ralph, Chen Tow, and Mai Ling set out by boat to a different area for the night, where Ralph will be mailed with the help of a dragon kite. While on the boat, Chen Tow falls into the water, causing Ralph to jump in after him. Chen Tow climbs back onto the boat, to Ralph's relief, and Mai Ling reveals the next morning that Ralph had passed a test of courage. Back on land, Ralph boards a new letter addressed to Sydney, which is launched into the air by kids puppeteering a dragon kite and, with Mai Ling's help, lands in the bike basket of a passing mail courier.

In Sydney, Ralph is delivered to Cheryl, the granddaughter of the deceased former owner of the stamp shop, which has now been converted into a bookstore. She informs Ralph that a boy claiming to be Charles had arrived the day prior, also by mail, and went searching for her uncle Mad Mike, who inherited her grandfather's items. Mad Mike, a former aspiring zookeeper, was driven insane after someone mysteriously poisoned his animals, and Cheryl initially refuses to bring Ralph to his place, but ultimately takes him. They arrive at Mad Mike's, where they realize that "Charles" was actually Tommy in disguise, and witness him being captured and detained by Mad Mike and his partner Dave for attempting to steal Charles' stamp book. At night, Ralph offers Mad Mike a koala for his zoo in exchange for Tommy and the stamp book, which he agrees to. As they leave, Tommy notes to Ralph that he is no longer stuttering. A kangaroo mails Ralph and Tommy back to Montreal the following morning.

Back home, the kids show off Charles' stamp book to Ralph's parents and Mr. Bronson, who is revealed to have reacquired the original Bluenose and returns it to Ralph's father. Mr. Bronson reveals a different Bluenose in his possession, one featuring a boy on the ship's bow holding a briefcase with inscribed name "Charles". Realising that the boy on the stamp is actually Charles Merriweather, and that he has been in the stamp for seven decades, Ralph pitches a plan to mail the stamp to himself to allow Charles to be freed. As Ralph and the others debate where Charles would stay after his release, Tommy suffers a "relapse" of old habits and steals the stamp, causing everyone to chase after him down the street.

An ending voice-over by Ralph reveals that Tommy, after overcoming his temporary relapse, eventually mailed the stamp to Mr. Bronson, and the freed Charles, still physically eleven but now seventy-one, resides in a spare bedroom at his house.

== Cast ==
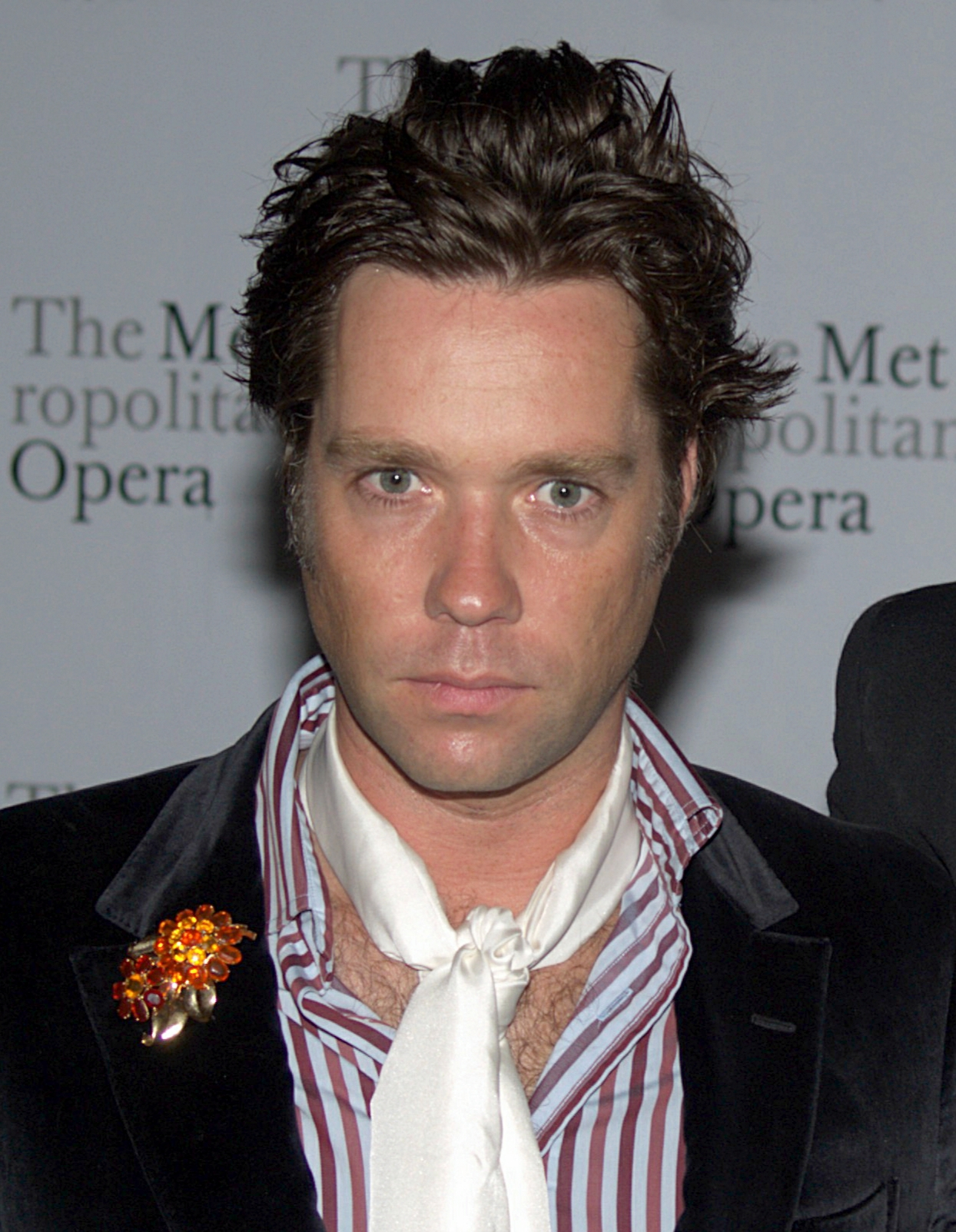
Rufus Wainwright made his film debut as one of Tommy's classmates and contributed the song "I'm Running" to the films soundtrack.

- Lucas Evans as Ralph James
- Anthony Rogers as Tommy Tricker
- Jill Stanley as Nancy James
- Andrew Whitehead as Albert
- Paul Popowich as Cass
- Han Yun as Mai Ling
- Chen Yuen Tao as Chen Tow
- Catherine Wright as Cheryl
- Cree Rubbo as Cree
- Rufus Wainwright as Singer
- Ron Lea as Brin James
- Linda E. Smith as Jane James
- John Dapery as Mr. Bronson
- Tony Barry as Mad Mike
- Ernie Dingo as Dave

== Production ==
For the casting process, writer and director Michael Rubbo toured various schools throughout Canada and acted out the film's plot to various children in order to find interested candidates. Rubbo, who had performed similar tactics while casting for his previous film, The Peanut Butter Solution, would then record auditions by selecting a scene and filming two or three candidates improvising. 3,000 children in total auditioned for the film, from cities including Ottawa, Hamilton, Calgary, and Vancouver, with Rubbo often recording up to 500 or more auditions of potential cast members. Eventually, Anthony Rogers, Jill Stanley, and Andrew Whitehead, all from Ottawa, were cast as main characters Tommy Tricker, Nancy, and Albert respectively. Filling out the main cast were Lucas Evans, from Montreal, as Ralph, and Paul Popowich, from Hamilton, as Cass, Tommy's friend. Of the main child actors, only Popowich would continue pursuing an acting career.

The scene were Cass chases Ralph, Nancy, and Albert through a shopping mall while Rufus Wainwright sings "I'm Running" was filmed at the Complexe Desjardins mall.

== Soundtrack ==
Tommy Tricker and the Stamp Traveller

Studio album by Kate, Anna, and Jane McGarrigle, Rufus Wainwright, and Martha Wainwright / Michael Rubbo (English) / Claire Pimparé (French)
- Released: 1988
- Genre: Soundtrack
- Length: 43:15
- Labels: La Fête; Les Amusements Hollywood

The film features one of the first appearances of Rufus Wainwright. Wainwright also provides the song "I'm a Runnin" and his sister, Martha Wainwright, provides the song "Tommy, Come Back" for the soundtrack. A French version of the latter, called "Tommy Reviens" was also recorded for the film's French language release.

A soundtrack was released alongside the movie on vinyl and cassette formats. It features a narrator retelling the events of the movie, split into three parts, and contains music and dialogue from the film. Two versions exist, an English version narrated by Rubbo, and a French version narrated by Claire Pimparé. Both versions contain "I'm Running" and corresponding language versions of "Tommy Come Back". While the English version remains out of print, the French version was made available on iTunes in 2014, alongside both songs from the movie.

"I'm Running" later appeared on Rufus Wainwright's 2011 boxset House of Rufus. It appears as the opening track on the compilation's eleventh CD Rufus at the Movies, a collection of soundtrack songs from throughout Wainwright's career, alongside songs from other films including Moulin Rouge, Shrek, Brokeback Mountain, and Meet the Robinsons.

== Release ==
Tommy Tricker and the Stamp Traveller released in Canadian theatres on December 16, 1988. Its initial Canadian theatrical run was sponsored by Vachon Bakery and the Canada Post Corporation.

=== Home media ===
The film was released on Blu-ray in 2019, as a double feature with its sequel The Return of Tommy Tricker, through Unidisc and Attraction Distribution.

In the United States, the film was released on VHS through Family Home Entertainment. Hen's Tooth Video released the film on DVD on October 24, 2006.

The film made its television debut on the Disney Channel on November 10, 1989, and aired on the network at various points into the 1990's.

== Reception ==
=== Critical reception ===
Noel Taylor of the Ottawa Citizen awarded the film four stars, writing that the film "has [a] sense of anything-is-possible adventure that children delight in and the spark of imagination that parents warm to". Taylor also highlighted the Ottawa actors featured in the film. Henry Mietkiewicz of the Toronto Star praised Tommy Tricker as "far and away the best family movie of the holiday season. Read 'em and weep, Disney."

Lin Connery of the Calgary Herald gave the film a negative review, writing that, "In the right hands, the premise for Tommy Tricker could have been worked into a fascinating children's film. As it is, this particular product should have been boiled down to a one-hour television special". Connery criticized the "over-emoting" child performances (singling out Lucas Evans's "phoney stutter" as Ralph), humour, and dialogue, and also mocked the film's product placement, noting that "bored viewers might amuse themselves by counting the number of times the Vachon corporation, a sponsor, manages to get their chocolate-covered snacks onscreen."

=== Accolades ===
Tommy Tricker received two nominations at the 1989 Genie Awards. Michael Rubbo was nominated for Best Original Screenplay, losing to Milk and Honey, while Rufus Wainwright was nominated for Best Original Song for "I'm Running", but lost to the title song from the film Cowboys Don't Cry. Wainwright later reflected that he was happy with his loss, stating, "You don't want to get too many awards and accolades when you're too young" and that it would have been "too weird" if he won.

Wainwright's experience at the ceremony, which he described as a "vast, unclapping void", led to his brief disillusionment with pop music and helped trigger a desire to pursue classical music, which he would explore later in his solo career.

Award	Category	Recipient	Result
Genie Awards	Best Original Screenplay	Michael Rubbo	Nominated
Genie Awards	Best Original Song	"I'm Running"; Music and lyrics by Rufus Wainwright	Nominated

== Planned remake ==
In 2009, a planned remake of Tommy Tricker and the Stamp Traveller was announced, with La Fête and Anonymous Content co-producing. According to original producer Rock Demers, Anonymous Content signed a one-year deal to co-produce the film, and was searching for a director. No updates were made on the project since.
