= Anna McGarrigle =

Canadian singer-songwriter (born 1944)

Anna McGarrigle CM
- Born: December 4, 1944 (age 81); Montreal, Quebec, Canada
- Genres: Folk
- Occupations: Musician, singer-songwriter
- Instruments: Vocals; button accordion; banjo; guitar; piano
- Years active: 1970–present
- Website: mcgarrigles.com

Anna McGarrigle, CM (born December 4, 1944) is a Canadian folk music singer and songwriter who recorded and performed with her late sister Kate McGarrigle.

== Early life ==
Anna McGarrigle studied at the École des beaux-arts de Montréal (1964–1968).

== Music career ==
In the 1960s, Montreal natives Kate and Anna McGarrigle established themselves in Montreal's burgeoning folk scene while they attended school. From 1963 to 1967, they teamed up with Jack Nissenson and Peter Weldon to form the folk group Mountain City Four. The sisters wrote, recorded and performed music into the twenty-first century with assorted accompanying musicians, including Chaim Tannenbaum and Joel Zifkin.

McGarrigle was also a songwriter; her song "Heart Like a Wheel" was the title track of Linda Ronstadt's 1974 album, and her song "Cool River" was recorded by Maria Muldaur.

In 2016, Anna and her older sister Jane (1941–2025) wrote a book together, Mountain City Girls.

== Personal life ==
McGarrigle married journalist Dane Lanken on August 25, 1977, in Hawkesbury, Ontario. She and Lanken have two children, Sylvan (b. 1977) and Lily (b. 1979).

== Awards ==
Kate and Anna's 1976 debut album Kate & Anna McGarrigle was chosen by Melody Maker as Best Record of the Year. In 1993, she was made a Member of the Order of Canada.

The duo's albums Matapedia (1996) and The McGarrigle Hour (1998) won Juno Awards. In 1999, Kate and Anna received Women of Originality awards and in 2006 SOCAN Lifetime Achievement awards.

In 2017, she was presented with a Quebec Arts and Letters Award.

== Discography ==
- Kate & Anna McGarrigle (1976)
- Dancer with Bruised Knees (1977)
- Pronto Monto (1978)
- Entre Lajeunesse et la sagesse (1980)
- Love Over and Over (1982)
- Heartbeats Accelerating (1990)
- Matapédia (1996)
- The McGarrigle Hour (1998)
- La vache qui pleure (2003)
- The McGarrigle Christmas Hour (2005)
- ODDiTTiES (2010)
- Tell My Sister (2011)
- Sing Me the Songs: Celebrating the Works of Kate McGarrigle (2013)
- Tant Le Monde: Live in Bremen, Germany, 2005 (2022)
