= Pronto Monto =

Studio album by Kate & Anna McGarrigle
- Released: 1978
- Recorded: 1978
- Studio: Sunset Sound, Hollywood; A&R, New York City; Automated Sound, New York; Redwing, Tarzana, California
- Genre: Folk
- Length: 39:15
- Label: Warner Bros. BSK 3248
- Producer: David Nichtern

Kate & Anna McGarrigle chronology
Dancer with Bruised Knees (1977)	Pronto Monto (1978)	Entre Lajeunesse et la sagesse (1980)

Pronto Monto is the third album by Kate & Anna McGarrigle, released in 1978. The title is an approximate pronunciation of the French phrase "prends ton manteau", which means "take your coat". The album did not meet sales expectations, and the sisters were dropped from Warner Bros. Records soon afterward. In 2016, the album was released on CD by Omnivore Recordings.

== Critical reception ==
Professional ratings
Review scores
Source	Rating
Christgau's Record Guide	B+
The Rolling Stone Album Guide	3.5/5 stars

The New York Times wrote that the album has a "shiny gloss, and it robs their songs of some of the innocence that distinguished them before."

== Track listing ==
1. "Oh My Heart" (Anna McGarrigle, Dane Lanken) – 3:07
2. "Side of Fries" (Kate McGarrigle, Philippe Tatartcheff) – 3:22
3. "Just Another Broken Heart" (David Nichtern) – 3:33
4. "NaCl (Sodium Chloride)" (Kate McGarrigle) – 2:28
5. "Pronto Monto (Prends ton manteau)" (Kate & Anna McGarrigle, Philippe Tatartcheff) – 2:51
6. "Stella by Artois" (Kate McGarrigle) – 3:53
7. "Bundle of Sorrow, Bundle of Joy" (Anna McGarrigle) – 4:04
8. "Come Back Baby" (Kate McGarrigle) – 3:18
9. "Tryin' to Get to You" (Charlie Singleton, Rose McCoy) – 2:39
10. "Fixture in the Park" (Anna McGarrigle) – 3:37
11. "Dead Weight" (Anna McGarrigle) – 2:27
12. "Cover Up My Head" (William Dumaresq, Galt MacDermot) – 2:53

== Personnel ==
- Kate and Anna McGarrigle - vocals, piano, accordion, acoustic guitar
- David Spinozza, Jeff Mironov, Jerry Donahue, Scot Lang, David Nichtern, Richard Resnicoff – guitar
- Jon Sholle – electric steel guitar, F-hole guitar, acoustic guitar
- Tony Levin, Gordon Edwards, Freebo, Bob Glaub, Pat Donaldson – bass
- Michael Moore – double bass
- Ken "Disco Stu" Pearson – keyboards
- Steve Gadd, Bernard Purdie, Gary Mallaber, Grady Tate, Gary Mure – drums
- Susan Evans, George Devens, Victor Feldman – percussion
- Kenny Kosek – fiddle
- Chaim Tannenbaum – mandolin, harmonica, backing vocals
- David Woodford, Bryan Cumming – tenor saxophone
- George Young – clarinet
- David Campbell - string arrangements
- Howard Johnson - horn arrangements
