= Sing Me the Songs That Say I Love You: A Concert for Kate McGarrigle =

2012 film by Lian Lunson

- Directed by: Lian Lunson
- Produced by: Lian Lunson; Teddy Wainwright; Executive producers Martha Wainwright; Rufus Wainwright; Wim Wenders
- Production company: Horse Pictures
- Release date: April 29, 2012 (Sundance London)

Sing Me the Songs That Say I Love You: A Concert for Kate McGarrigle is a 2012 documentary film directed by Lian Lunson. It follows a memorial concert on May 12, 2011 at Town Hall in New York City to pay tribute to musician Kate McGarrigle, who died from sarcoma at the age of 63 in 2010. The concert was headlined by Kate's children Martha and Rufus Wainwright, while also featuring her sisters Jane and Anna McGarrigle, comedian Jimmy Fallon, and musicians Emmylou Harris, Norah Jones, Antony and Teddy Thompson. The compilation album Sing Me the Songs: Celebrating the Works of Kate McGarrigle serves as the film's soundtrack.

== Reception ==
The review aggregation website Rotten Tomatoes reported a 43% approval rating with an average rating of 5.5/10/10 based on 7 reviews. Metacritic assigned a score of 61 out of 100, based on 5 critics, indicating "generally favorable reviews".
