= Dancer with Bruised Knees =

Studio album by Kate and Anna McGarrigle
- Released: 1977
- Recorded: 1977
- Studios: A&R, New York City; San Quebec, Montreal; Le Studio, Morin-Heights, Quebec
- Genre: Folk
- Length: 40:59
- Label: Warner Bros.
- Producer: Joe Boyd

Kate and Anna McGarrigle chronology
Kate & Anna McGarrigle (1976)	Dancer with Bruised Knees (1977)	Pronto Monto (1978)

Dancer with Bruised Knees is the second album by Kate & Anna McGarrigle, released in 1977. It was produced by Joe Boyd. The album employed several notable folk musicians to contribute a bluegrass feel to many of the tracks. The album also includes three French songs, one by the McGarrigles with Philippe Tatartcheff, and two traditional numbers. The guest musicians included John Cale, Dane Lanken, Bill Monroe, Dave Mattacks and Pat Donaldson. Dancer with Bruised Knees peaked a No. 35 on the UK Albums Chart.

== Reception ==
Professional ratings
Review scores
Source	Rating
AllMusic	4/5 stars
Christgau's Record Guide	A
MusicHound Folk: The Essential Album Guide	5/5 stars
The Rolling Stone Album Guide	4/5 stars

Robert Christgau said the album is "not as tuneful as some might wish" but is nonetheless "even better than the debut". He particularly complimented the studio techniques. The Globe and Mail determined that "their songwriting is serious business but the informality of their records remains their most charming asset". The New York Times noted that "there is an element of coyness here that is slightly disconcerting... And the songs—Anna's in particular—don't match the great songs on the first album."

== Track listing ==
1. "Dancer with Bruised Knees" (Anna McGarrigle) – 3:46
2. "Southern Boys" (Kate McGarrigle) – 3:20
3. "No Biscuit Blues" (William Dumaresq, Galt MacDermot) – 1:43
4. "First Born" (Kate McGarrigle) – 3:55
5. "Blanche comme la neige" (Traditional; arranged by Kate & Anna McGarrigle) – 3:44
6. "Perrine était servante" (Traditional; arranged by Kate & Anna McGarrigle) – 3:14
7. "Be My Baby" (Anna McGarrigle) – 3:11
8. "Walking Song" (Kate McGarrigle) – 3:33
9. "Naufragée du tendre (Shipwrecked)" (Anna McGarrigle, Philippe Tatartcheff) – 3:46
10. "Hommage à Grungie" (Kate McGarrigle) – 3:54
11. "Kitty Come Home" (Anna McGarrigle) – 4:36
12. "Come a Long Way" (Kate McGarrigle) – 2:17

== Personnel ==
- Anna McGarrigle - banjo, button accordion on "First Born" and "Come a Long Way", keyboards, vocals (tracks A1, A5-B1, B3, B5, B6)
- Kate McGarrigle - guitar, piano, button accordion on "Blanche Comme la Neige" and "Perrine Etait Servante", organ on "Kitty Come Home", banjo on "Come a Long way", vocals (tracks A2-A6, B2-B4, B6)
- John Cale - organ on "Dancer with Bruised Knees"; marimba on "Be My Baby"
- Richard Davis - bass guitar on "Southern Boys"
- Grady Tate - drums on "Dancer with Bruised Knees"
- Sue Evans - percussion on "Be My Baby"
- George Bohanon - horns on "Naufragee du Tendre (Shipwrecked)"
- Jane McGarrigle - organ on "Blanche Comme la Neige" and "Perrine Etait Servante"
- Andrew Cowan - guitar
- Ron Doleman - violin on "Blanche Comme la Neige" and "Perrine Etait Servante"
- Pat Donaldson, Michael Visceglia - bass guitar
- Gordie Fleming - accordion on "Walking Song"
- Steve Gadd - drums
- Scot Lang - guitar
- Dane Lanken - trumpet on "Perrine Etait Servante"
- Gilles Losier - bass on "Walking Song", violin
- Dave Mattacks - drums
- Tommy Morgan - harmonica on "Southern Boys"
- Ken Pearson - organ on "First Born" and "Be My Baby", electric piano on "Naufragee du Tendre (Shipwrecked)"
- Warren Smith - congas on "First Born"
- Chaim Tannenbaum - guitar, harmonica on "The Biscuit Song" and "Hommage a Grungie", mandolin and recorder on "Blanche Comme la Neige", recorder on "Perrine Etait Servante", backing vocals
- Jay Ungar - violin on "Come a Long Way"
- Peter Weldon - banjo, harmonica on "Blanche Comme la Neige" and "Perrine Etait Servante", vocals
