= Tell My Sister =

Box set by Kate & Anna McGarrigle
- Released: May 3, 2011
- Genre: Pop
- Length: 137:58
- Label: Nonesuch
- Producer: Joe Boyd

Kate & Anna McGarrigle chronology
ODDiTTiES (2010)	Tell My Sister (2011)	Sing Me the Songs: Celebrating the Works of Kate McGarrigle (2013)

Tell My Sister is a three-disc compilation album consisting of songs recorded by Kate & Anna McGarrigle. It was released by Nonesuch Records as a box set on May 3, 2011, a year after Kate's death. The first two discs contain Kate & Anna McGarrigle's first two albums, Kate & Anna McGarrigle and Dancer with Bruised Knees. The third disc comprises demos, including acoustic versions and other previously unreleased tracks.

== Critical reception ==
Professional ratings
Review scores
Source	Rating
AllMusic	4.5/5 stars
American Songwriter	4/5 stars
MSN Music (Expert Witness)	A
MusicOMH	4/5 stars
Spin	(favorable)
Uncut	(favorable)

Tell My Sister received generally favorable reviews from critics. Andrew Hultkrans of Spin wrote that "The McGarrigles’ songs are deceptively simple, but their inventive arrangements, unpredictable harmonizing, and hints of chanson reveal an eccentric genius." Another favorable review of the album was written by AllMusic's Mark Deming, who gave it 4.5 out of 5 stars. In his review of the album, Deming wrote that it was "a superb tribute to the McGarrigle Sisters' formative years," adding that "while this was doubtless created with serious fans in mind, there are few better introductions to the magic they created than the music included here."

== Track listing ==
=== Disc 1 ===
This disc consists entirely of the McGarrigles' first album, Kate & Anna McGarrigle.

1. "Kiss and Say Goodbye" (Kate McGarrigle) – 2:47
2. "My Town" (Anna McGarrigle) – 2:57
3. "Blues in D" (Kate McGarrigle) – 2:43
4. "Heart Like a Wheel" (Anna McGarrigle) – 3:08
5. "Foolish You" (Wade Hemsworth) – 3:02
6. "(Talk to Me of) Mendocino" (Kate McGarrigle) – 3:08
7. "Complainte pour Ste-Catherine" (Anna McGarrigle, Philippe Tatartcheff) – 2:48
8. "Tell My Sister" (Kate McGarrigle) – 3:37
9. "Swimming Song" (Loudon Wainwright III) – 2:26
10. "Jigsaw Puzzle of Life" (Anna McGarrigle) – 2:29
11. "Go Leave" (Kate McGarrigle) – 3:19
12. "Travellin' on for Jesus" (Traditional, arranged by J. Spence) – 2:42

=== Disc 2 ===
This disc consists entirely of the McGarrigles' second album, Dancer with Bruised Knees.

1. "Dancer with Bruised Knees" (Anna McGarrigle) – 3:46
2. "Southern Boys" (Kate McGarrigle) – 3:20
3. "No Biscuit Blues" (William Dumaresq, Galt MacDermot) – 1:43
4. "First Born" (Kate McGarrigle) – 3:55
5. "Blanche comme la neige" (Traditional; arranged by Kate & Anna McGarrigle) – 3:44
6. "Perrine était servante" (Traditional; arranged by Kate & Anna McGarrigle) – 3:14
7. "Be My Baby" (Anna McGarrigle) – 3:11
8. "Walking Song" (Kate McGarrigle) – 3:33
9. "Naufragée du tendre" (Anna McGarrigle, Philippe Tatartcheff) – 3:46
10. "Hommage à Grungie" (Kate McGarrigle) – 3:54
11. "Kitty Come Home" (Anna McGarrigle) – 4:36
12. "Come a Long Way" (Kate McGarrigle) – 2:17

=== Disc 3 ===
This disc, entitled Tell My Sister consists of previously unreleased recordings by the McGarrigles.

1. "The Work Song" (Kate McGarrigle) – 3:09
2. "Come Back Baby" (Kate McGarrigle) – 3:28
3. "Jigsaw Puzzle of Life" (1974 Version, Amigo Studios) (Anna McGarrigle) – 2:27
4. "Saratoga Summer Song" (Kate McGarrigle) – 3:53
5. "Annie" (Chaim Tannenbaum) – 3:45
6. "On My Way to Town" (Kate McGarrigle) – 2:34
7. "Roses Blanches" (Kate & Anna McGarrigle) – 2:39
8. "Heart Like a Wheel" (1974 Version, Amigo Studios) (Anna McGarrigle) – 2:43
9. "Kiss and Say Goodbye" (1974 Version, A&R Studios) (Kate McGarrigle) – 2:48
10. "Southern Boys" (1971 Version, NYC) (Kate McGarrigle) – 2:56
11. "Willie Moore" (Kate & Anna McGarrigle) – 4:03
12. "Oliver, Remember Me?" (Kate McGarrigle) – 1:23
13. "My Town" (1974 Version, Amigo Studios) (Anna McGarrigle) – 2:43
14. "Blues in E" (Kate McGarrigle) – 2:06
15. "Walking Song" (1971 Version, NYC) (Kate McGarrigle) – 2:25
16. "Tell My Sister" (1971 Version, NYC) (Kate McGarrigle) – 3:35
17. "Over the Hill" (Loudon Wainwright III) – 2:35
18. "Come a Long Way" (1971 Version, NYC) (Kate McGarrigle) – 1:52
19. "(Talk to Me of) Mendocino" (1974 Version, Amigo Studios) (Kate McGarrigle) – 3:02
20. "Heart Like a Wheel" (1971 Version, NYC) (Anna McGarrigle) – 2:32
21. "(Talk to Me of) Mendocino" (1971 Version, NYC) (Kate McGarrigle) – 2:56
