= Heartbeats Accelerating =

Studio album by Kate & Anna McGarrigle
- Released: 1990
- Recorded: 1989–90
- Genre: Folk
- Length: 42:33
- Label: Private
- Producer: Pierre Marchand

Kate & Anna McGarrigle chronology
Love Over and Over (1982)	Heartbeats Accelerating (1990)	Matapédia (1996)

Professional ratings
Review scores
Source	Rating
AllMusic	link
Chicago Tribune	link
Entertainment Weekly	(B) link
Los Angeles Times	(favorable) link
The New York Times	(favorable) link

Heartbeats Accelerating is the sixth album by Kate & Anna McGarrigle, released in 1990. It was their first album in eight years, after Love Over and Over in 1982, and received favourable reviews from many music critics.

Bill Dillon, Pierre Marchand, Joel Zifkin and Kate's son Rufus Wainwright appear as guest musicians.

The title track was covered by Linda Ronstadt on her 1993 album Winter Light. It was given a New Age treatment in the vein of Enya and became a worldwide hit. Issued as a single, Ronstadt's version of the song reached the Top 30 at the Adult Contemporary format in America, number 12 on Billboard's Bubbling Under Hot 100 Singles chart in the United States, and peaked at number 17 on Canada's RPM 100 Hit Tracks (the Canadian equivalent of the Billboard Hot 100). Aided by a romantic music video, it was also successful in several other countries, including Australia.

The song "I Eat Dinner (When the Hunger's Gone)" was covered in 2004 by Kate's son Rufus Wainwright along with Dido for the film Bridget Jones: The Edge of Reason and it appears on the soundtrack album.

Cœur de pirate covered the album's title track on the soundtrack album for the fifth season of the television drama series Trauma.

Emmylou Harris included a cover of the song "Love Is", with backing vocals by Kate and Anna, on her 1989 album "Bluebird" - 2 years before it was included in the McGarrigle's own album.

== Track listing ==
1. "Heartbeats Accelerating" (Anna McGarrigle) – 3:38
2. "I Eat Dinner (When the Hunger's Gone)" (Kate McGarrigle) – 4:54
3. "Rainbow Ride" (Anna McGarrigle, Philippe Tatartcheff)– 4:38
4. "Mother Mother" (Kate McGarrigle) – 4:20
5. "Love Is" (Kate McGarrigle, Anna McGarrigle, Jane McGarrigle) – 4:40
6. "D.J. Serenade" (Philippe Tatartcheff) – 4:10
7. "I'm Losing You" (Kate McGarrigle) – 3:49
8. "Hit and Run Love" (Anna McGarrigle) – 4:08
9. "Leave Me Be" (Kate & Anna McGarrigle)– 5:17
10. "St. James Hospital (Cowboy's Lament)" (Traditional; arranged by Doc Watson) – 2:59

== Personnel ==
- Anna McGarrigle – vocals, keyboards, drum (5).
- Kate McGarrigle – vocals, accordion, piano, guitar, banjo, keyboards.
- Yves Gigon – drums (1, 3, 9), percussion (3, 5).
- Daniel Gigon – bass (1, 3).
- Michael Breen – guitar (1, 2, 7).
- Joel Zifkin – violin (1, 7, 9).
- Pierre Marchand – keyboards, accordion, vocals (7).
- Bill Dillon – guitars (2, 3, 4, 5, 6, 9).
- Michel Dupire – percussion (3, 9).
- Jason Lang – guitars (4, 8).
- Marc Langis – bass (3, 6).
- Norman Barsalo – bass (5).
- Richard Mischook – guitar (6, 8).
- Rufus Wainwright – vocals (7).
- Pat Donaldson – bass, guitar (9).
