= The McGarrigle Hour =

Studio album by Kate & Anna McGarrigle
- Released: October 13, 1998
- Recorded: 1998
- Genre: Folk
- Length: 68:54
- Label: Hannibal Records HNCD 1417
- Producer: Joe Boyd

Kate & Anna McGarrigle chronology
Matapédia (1996)	The McGarrigle Hour (1998)	La vache qui pleure (2003)

Professional ratings
Review scores
Source	Rating
Allmusic	link
Entertainment Weekly	A− link

The McGarrigle Hour is the eighth studio album by Kate & Anna McGarrigle, released on October 13, 1998.

The album was recorded at a family gathering, including Kate's former husband Loudon Wainwright III, their son and daughter Rufus Wainwright and Martha Wainwright, Anna's husband Dane Lanken, their son and daughter Sylvan Lanken and Lily Lanken, and Kate and Anna's sister Jane McGarrigle.

Several of the McGarrigle sisters' friends and collaborators, including Emmylou Harris, Linda Ronstadt, Chaim Tannenbaum, Joel Zifkin and Philippe Tatartcheff, also appear on the album.

The combo perform a mix of traditional folk tunes, pop standards and original material by the participants.

Two of the songs, "Gentle Annie" and "Skip Rope Song", were recorded separately with Linda Ronstadt and Emmylou Harris in Tucson, Arizona. The sisters had been invited down to Arizona in order to participate on Harris and Ronstadt's 1999 album 'Western Wall: The Tucson Sessions'. Kate & Anna accepted the offer to feature on the album, but asked Harris and Ronstadt feature on their next album in exchange. Harris later also recorded several songs for the album during the normal recording sessions in Montreal.

A DVD of a live show featured most of The McGarrigle Hour was released a year after the album. Some of the songs were accompanied by video interviews of Kate & Anna McGarrigle discussing the songs. The DVD also contained two 'Music Videos' of the songs recorded in Tucson - neither Harris nor Ronstadt was present at the live show - and a handful of songs from a 1980 concert at Teatro Expo in Montreal.

The album won the Juno Award for Roots & Traditional Album of the Year - Group at the Juno Awards of 1999.

== Track listing ==
1. "School Days" (Loudon Wainwright III) – 2:52
2. "Skip Rope Song" (Jesse Winchester) – 2:34
3. "Gentle Annie" (Stephen Foster) – 2:59
4. "Alice Blue Gown" (Joseph McCarthy, Harry Tierney) – 2:39
5. "Porte en arrière" (D. L. Menard) – 3:05
6. "What'll I Do?" (Irving Berlin) – 3:37
7. "Dig My Grave" (Traditional) – 2:38
8. "Cool River" (Anna McGarrigle, Audrey Bean) – 3:32
9. "Heartburn" (Rufus Wainwright) – 2:28
10. "NaCl (Sodium Chloride)" (Kate McGarrigle) – 2:30
11. "Bon Voyage" (Jacques Laure, Danny Small) – 3:25
12. "Allez-vous en" (Cole Porter) – 3:43
13. "Green, Green Rocky Road" (Traditional) – 3:54
14. "Young Love" (Ric Cartey, Carole Joyner) – 3:23
15. "Year of the Dragon" (Martha Wainwright) – 5:20
16. "Forever and the Same" (Anna McGarrigle, Philippe Tatartcheff) – 3:29
17. "Talk to Me of Mendocino" (Kate McGarrigle) – 2:58
18. "Baltimore Fire" (Traditional) – 3:15
19. "Johnny's Gone to Hilo" (Traditional) – 3:09
20. "Time On My Hands" (Chaim Tannenbaum) – 4:15
21. "Goodnight Sweetheart" (Jimmy Campbell, Reginald Connelly, Ray Noble) – 2:09

== Personnel ==
=== Musicians ===
- Kate McGarrigle – vocals, harmony vocals, chorus, banjo, piano, guitar, accordion
- Anna McGarrigle – vocals, harmony vocals, chorus, guitar, accordion, piano, bass
- Jane McGarrigle – vocals, harmony vocals, chorus, piano
- Loudon Wainwright III – vocals, guitar
- Martha Wainwright – vocals, harmony vocals, guitar
- Rufus Wainwright – vocals, harmony vocals, piano
- Dane Lanken - vocals, harmony vocals
- Sylvan Lanken – harmony vocals
- Lily Lanken – vocals, harmony vocals
- Chaim Tannenbaum – vocals, mandolin, background vocals, whistling
- Michel Pépin – guitar, bass, mandolin, drums
- Joel Zifkin – violin, fiddle, back up vocals
- Tom Mennier – piano
- John McColgan – drums, percussion
- Linda Ronstadt – vocals (3)
- Emmylou Harris – vocals (2, 5, 13)
- Philippe Tatartcheff – recitation

=== Production team ===
- Joe Boyd – producer
- John Wood – recording and mixing
- Don Murnaghan – assistant engineer, additional photography
- Michel Pépin – mixing of "School Days" and "Green, Green Rocky Road"
- Randy Saharouni – cover concept, photography and design
- Melissa Caro – additional photography
- Sylvan Lanken – additional photography
- Anna McGarrigle – additional photography
