= Joel Zifkin =

Canadian musician and songwriter (born 1954)

Background information
- Born: April 14, 1954 (age 72); Montreal, Quebec, Canada
- Occupations: Electric violinist, musician, composer, singer-songwriter
- Instruments: Electric violin; guitar; bass; mandolin; vocals
- Years active: 1972–present

Joel Zifkin (born April 14, 1954) is a Canadian musician and songwriter. His primary instrument is the electric violin and he is best known as a session musician and live performer.

== Career ==
Zifkin has performed and/or recorded with the following artists: Kate & Anna McGarrigle, Richard Thompson, Rufus Wainwright, Martha Wainwright, Emmylou Harris, Buddy Guy, Big Mama Thornton, Eddie "Cleanhead" Vinson, Philip Glass, Lou Reed, Townes Van Zandt, Rational Youth, Joe Dassin, Roma Baran, Elvis Costello, Wade Hemsworth, Pierre Marchand, Robert Charlebois, Les Colocs, Yaya Diallo, Chaim Tannenbaum, Joe Boyd, The Chieftains, Pat Donaldson, Ravens & Chimes, Hal Willner's Harry Smith Project: Anthology of American Folk Music Revisited, among others.

He also appeared in the film Hank Williams: The Show He Never Gave (1980) and the documentary Sing Me the Songs That Say I Love You: A Concert for Kate McGarrigle, directed by Lian Lunson (2013).

Zifkin released the self-titled solo album Joel Zifkin in 2004, Five Songs More in 2008, and the singles "When Insanity Reigns It Pours" and "The Glow" in 2013, all on iTunes.

== Selected credits ==
Solo

- Joel Zifkin (2004)
- Five Songs More (2008)

With Kate & Anna McGarrigle

- Heartbeats Accelerating (1990)
- "Was My Brother in the Battle?", "Hard Times Come Again No More", "Better Times Are Coming", on Songs of the Civil War (1991)
- Matapédia (1996) – Canada #49; winner of 1997 Juno Award for Roots & Traditional Album of the Year – Group)
- The McGarrigle Hour (1998) – winner of 1999 Juno Award for Roots & Traditional Album of the Year – Group)
- La vache qui pleure (2003)
- The McGarrigle Christmas Hour (2005)
- Before Tomorrow (French title Le jour avant le lendemain) film soundtrack (2008)
- ODDiTTiES (2010)
- Sing Me the Songs: Celebrating the Works of Kate McGarrigle (2013)
- Tant Le Monde: Live in Bremen, Germany, 2005 (2022)

With World Café

- "DJ Serenade", on Live at the World Café - Volume 9 (1999)

With Richard Thompson

- Dream Attic (2010) (nominated for the Best Contemporary Folk Album award in the 53rd Annual Grammy Awards. )
- Live at Celtic Connections – The Richard Thompson Band (2012) DVD, Blu-ray Disc

With Rufus Wainwright

- Moulin Rouge! Music from Baz Luhrmann's Film (2001)
- When Love Speaks (2002)
- Vibrate: The Best of Rufus Wainwright (2014)

With The Wainwright Sisters

- Songs in the Dark (2015)

With Les Colocs

- Les Colocs (1993)
- Suite 2116 (posthumous; 2001)
- Il me parle de bonheur (2009)

== See also ==
- Kate & Anna McGarrigle
- Les Colocs
- Richard Thompson
