= Matapédia (album) =

Studio album by Kate & Anna McGarrigle
- Released: September 3, 1996
- Recorded: 1995–1996 at Le Studio, Morin Heights, Quebec
- Genre: Folk
- Length: 44:38
- Label: Hannibal/Rykodisc
- Producer: Pierre Marchand, Joe Boyd, Michel Pépin, Roma Baran

Kate & Anna McGarrigle chronology
Heartbeats Accelerating (1990)	Matapédia (1996)	The McGarrigle Hour (1998)

Professional ratings
Review scores
Source	Rating
AllMusic	2.5/5 stars
Robert Christgau	A−
Entertainment Weekly	B+

Matapédia is an album by the Canadian duo Kate & Anna McGarrigle, released in 1996.

Kate's daughter, Martha Wainwright, appears on the album as a backing vocalist and is directly mentioned in the title track's lyrics.

The title "Matapédia" refers to the river in eastern Quebec that runs down to the town of Matapédia, Quebec, and then out into baie des Chaleurs. The river's rhythm is supposed to inspire the loping beat of the album's title track.

The album won the Juno Award for Roots & Traditional Album of the Year - Group at the Juno Awards of 1997.

== Critical reception ==
The Chicago Tribune wrote that the songs "reflect on time's passage with a mixture of haunting ambiguity and bittersweet longing—qualities that have defined the duo's songbook from the beginning." The Los Angeles Times noted that "the old-time folksiness of the McGarrigles' sound is in the foreground once more, carried by fiddles and accordions."

AllMusic wrote that the sisters "return to their strengths by trimming back the synthesizers and sticking with direct, folky testaments."

== Track listing ==
1. "Matapedia" (Kate McGarrigle) – 4:52
2. "Goin' Back to Harlan" (Anna McGarrigle) – 4:59
3. "I Don't Know" (Kate McGarrigle) – 4:28
4. "Hang Out Your Heart" (Kate & Anna McGarrigle, Philippe Tatartcheff, Chaim Tannenbaum) – 4:27
5. "Arbre" (Anna McGarrigle, Philippe Tatartcheff) – 3:14
6. "Jacques et Gilles" (Kate McGarrigle) – 4:27
7. "Why Must We Die" (Kate & Anna McGarrigle, Joel Zifkin) – 5:32
8. "Song for Gaby" (Anna McGarrigle) – 2:55
9. "Talk About It" (Kate & Anna McGarrigle) – 5:50
10. "The Bike Song" (Anna McGarrigle) – 3:54

== Personnel ==
- Kate McGarrigle - vocals, harmony vocals, chorus, banjo, piano, celeste, synthesizer
- Anna McGarrigle - vocals, harmony vocals, chorus, guitar, keyboards, piano, harpsichord, synthesizer
- Pierre Marchand - keyboards, accordion, drums, production
- Pat Donaldson - guitar, bass
- Michel Pépin - guitar, dobro, bass, percussion, backing vocals
- Andrew Cowan - guitar
- Joel Zifkin - violin, fiddle, backing vocals
- Gilles Losier - violin
- Sylvain Clavet - drums, percussions
- Mike DiNardo - drums
- Gordie Adamson - drums
- Lily Lanken - harmony vocals
- Martha Wainwright - harmony vocals
