= Kate & Anna McGarrigle (album) =

Studio album by Kate & Anna McGarrigle
- Released: January 1976
- Recorded: Late 1974-1975
- Studios: A&R, New York City; Sunwest, Hollywood
- Genre: Folk
- Length: 35:06
- Label: Warner Bros.
- Producers: Joe Boyd, Greg Prestopino

Kate & Anna McGarrigle chronology
Kate & Anna McGarrigle (1976)	Dancer with Bruised Knees (1977)

Kate & Anna McGarrigle is the debut album by Kate & Anna McGarrigle, released in January 1976. Guest musicians on the album include Lowell George, Bobby Keys, Jay Ungar, and Tony Levin as well as family and friends such as eldest sister Jane McGarrigle, Anna McGarrigle's husband Dane Lanken, and the siblings' old friend Chaim Tannenbaum.

"Swimming Song" was written and originally performed by Kate's husband at the time, singer-songwriter Loudon Wainwright III, who is also referenced (without being explicitly named) in the song "Go Leave".

== Reception ==
Professional ratings
Review scores
Source	Rating
AllMusic	5/5 stars
Christgau's Record Guide	A
Pitchfork	9.5/10
Rolling Stone	(very favorable)

In 2011, the British composer and television presenter Howard Goodall chose it as one of his "six best albums", stating "For me the two outstanding cuts are the utterly beautiful 'Heart Like a Wheel' and the French-Canadian pseudo-folk song 'Complainte pour Ste-Catherine'... the pair's gentle harmonies are unmistakable and unforgettable."

== Awards ==
On 25 December 1976, the album was voted Rock Album of the Year by London's Melody Maker. It was also listed at No. 5 on the 1976 Pazz & Jop poll. In 2016, the album was named as the jury winner of the Polaris Heritage Prize in the 1976-1985 division.

== Notable covers ==
The album includes "Heart Like a Wheel" (by Anna McGarrigle), which was first recorded in 1972 by McKendree Spring, then by Linda Ronstadt in 1974. That song subsequently has been covered by several other artists, including Billy Bragg, Katie Moore, the Corrs, and June Tabor.

Another song from the album, "(Talk to Me of) Mendocino" (by Kate McGarrigle), was also covered by Linda Ronstadt on her 1982 album Get Closer, by the English singer-songwriter John Howard on his 2007 E.P. The Bewlay Brothers, by Nona Marie and The Choir on their 2011 eponymous album, and by Karine Polwart and Dave Milligan on their 2021 record Still As Your Sleeping.

The song "Complainte pour Ste-Catherine" (by Anna McGarrigle and Philippe Tatartcheff) was covered by the British pop singer Kirsty MacColl in 1989.

The song "Go Leave" (by Kate McGarrigle) was covered by Anne Sofie von Otter with Elvis Costello.

Vetiver covered Wainwright's "Swimming Song" on their 2008 album, Thing of the Past.

== Track listing ==
1. "Kiss and Say Goodbye" (Kate McGarrigle) – 2:47
2. "My Town" (Anna McGarrigle) – 2:57
3. "Blues in D" (Kate McGarrigle) – 2:43
4. "Heart Like a Wheel" (Anna McGarrigle) – 3:08
5. "Foolish You" (Wade Hemsworth) – 3:02
6. "(Talk to Me of) Mendocino" (Kate McGarrigle) – 3:08
7. "Complainte pour Ste-Catherine" (Anna McGarrigle, Philippe Tatartcheff) – 2:48
8. "Tell My Sister" (Kate McGarrigle) – 3:37
9. "Swimming Song" (Loudon Wainwright III) – 2:26
10. "Jigsaw Puzzle of Life" (Anna McGarrigle) – 2:29
11. "Go Leave" (Kate McGarrigle) – 3:19
12. "Travellin' on for Jesus" (Traditional; arranged by Joseph Spence) – 2:42

== Personnel ==
- Anna McGarrigle - vocals, keyboards, banjo, button accordion
- Kate McGarrigle - vocals, banjo, piano, guitar
- Jane McGarrigle (credited as "Jane McGarrigle Forsland") - organ, backing vocals
- Chaim Tannenbaum - guitar, harmonica, backing vocals
- Lowell George, David Spinozza, Greg Prestopino, Hugh McCracken, Tony Rice, Amos Garrett, Andrew Gold - guitar
- David Grisman - mandolin
- Peter Weldon - banjo, backing vocals
- Jay Ungar, Gib Guilbeau - fiddle
- Red Callender - bass guitar
- Tony Levin - bass on "Complainte pour Sainte-Catherine"
- Steve Gadd, Russ Kunkel - drums
- Joel Tepp - harmonica, clarinet
- Bobby Keys - tenor saxophone
- Plas Johnson - alto saxophone, clarinet
- Nick DeCaro - accordion
- Dane Lanken - backing vocals

Technical

- John Wood - engineer
- Gail Kenney - front cover photography
