= The Log Driver's Waltz =

Song by Wade Hemsworth
- Language: English
- Songwriter: Wade Hemsworth
- Composer: Wade Hemsworth

External videos
- " Canada Vignettes: Log Driver's Waltz" (1979 ) – National Film Board of Canada (3:28 min)

The Log Driver's Waltz is a Canadian folk song, written by Wade Hemsworth. The Log Driver's Waltz is also a Canadian animated film from the National Film Board, released in 1979 as part of its Canada Vignettes series.

== Song information ==
The song celebrates the profession of log driving, a practice in the lumber industry which involved transporting felled timber by having workers walk or run on the logs as they floated down rivers. This occupation required a great deal of strength and physical agility, and Hemsworth was struck by how much the sight of log drivers at work resembled dancing.

The song's chorus is:

For he goes birling down and down the white water

That's where the log driver learns to step lightly
It's birling down, and down white water

A log driver's waltz pleases girls completely.

The lyrics are often misheard as "whirling" or "twirling" instead of "birling". "Birl" is an old Scots verb meaning "to revolve or cause to revolve", and in modern English means "to cause a floating log to rotate by treading". Today, birling survives as a competitive sport.

The song also contains considerable double-entendre, beginning with the sentiments of the opening stanza:

If you ask any girl from the parish around,

What pleases her most from her head to her toes;
She'll say, "I'm not sure that it's business of yours,

But I do like to waltz with a log driver."

Many artists have recorded renditions of the song, which is an enduring classic of Canadian music. The most famous version, by Kate & Anna McGarrigle and the Mountain City Four, was the soundtrack for a 1979 animated short film by the National Film Board. Captain Tractor's version of the song was also a popular alternative rock hit in the late 1990s. The Hidden Cameras, an indie pop band from Canada, recorded a version of the song on their 2016 release, Home on Native Land.

== Film information ==
Log Driver's Waltz, the 1979 animated adaptation, was directed by John Weldon. The animation is set to the recording of the song by Kate & Anna McGarrigle with, and as part of, The Mountain City Four. The film is one of the most-requested in the entire collection of the National Film Board of Canada. The NFB also produced a French version of the film, "La valse du maître draveur", with lyrics translated by Philippe Tatartcheff, the McGarrigle sisters' longtime collaborator.

The animation aired on Cartoon Network in the United States as part of the O Canada anthology series.

== See also ==
- Blackfly, a 1991 Oscar-nominated adaptation of another Wade Hemsworth song
- Canadian folklore
- Canada: A People's History
- Heritage Minutes
- The Greatest Canadian
- Hinterland Who's Who
