= List of Nonesuch Records artists =

The following is a list of bands, performers, composers, and conductors, past and present, who have had recordings released on the Nonesuch Records label or any of its subsidiaries or distributed labels, such as World Circuit:

== A ==
- John Adams
- Afro-Cuban All Stars (World Circuit/Nonesuch)
- AfroCubism (World Circuit/Nonesuch)
- Alarm Will Sound
- Edward Aldwell
- Arthur Alexander
- Tony Allen (World Circuit/Nonesuch)
- Amadou and Mariam
- Sam Amidon
- Laurie Anderson
- Maurice André
- Timo Andres
- Louis Andriessen
- Angá
- The Arcs
- Robert Ashley
- Sérgio and Odair Assad
- Dan Auerbach
- Abed Azrie

== B ==
- The Bad Plus
- Angelo Badalamenti
- George Balanchine
- Devendra Banhart
- Thomas Bartlett
- Fontella Bass
- Isabel Bayrakdarian
- Beaver & Krause
- Leonard Bernstein
- Malcolm Bilson
- Iva Bittová
- Björk
- The Black Keys
- Blakroc
- The Blind Boys of Alabama
- Afel Bocoum
- William Bolcom
- Bombino
- Boston Camerata
- Boston Symphony Chamber Players
- Billy Bragg
- Michelle Branch
- Tyondai Braxton
- Jon Brion
- Buena Vista Social Club
- T Bone Burnett
- Ken Burns
- Carter Burwell
- Anner Bylsma
- David Byrne
- Don Byron

== C ==
- John Cage
- Calliope
- Camille
- Carolina Chocolate Drops
- Elliott Carter
- Olivia Chaney
- Rhys Chatham
- Boozoo Chavis
- Guy Clark
- Shawn Colvin
- Paolo Conte
- Contemporary Chamber Ensemble
- Ry Cooder
- Jacob Cooper
- Bruno Coulais
- Christina Courtin
- Teresa Cristina
- Rodney Crowell
- George Crumb
- Czechoslovak Brass Orchestra

== D ==
- Michael Daves
- Nataly Dawn
- Yussef Dayes
- Jan DeGaetani
- Georges Delerue
- Jeremy Denk
- Donnacha Dennehy
- Toumani Diabaté (World Circuit/Nonesuch)
- Fatoumata Diawara (World Circuit/Nonesuch)
- Dirty Projectors
- Dr. John

== E ==
- Early Music Consort of London
- Hamza El Din
- Richard Ellsasser
- Brian Eno
- Ensemble Alcatraz
- Estrellas de Areito (World Circuit/Nonesuch)
- Donald Erb
- Estrellas de Areito
- Bill Evans

== F ==
- Fatboy Slim
- Charlie Feathers
- Michael Feinstein
- Ibrahim Ferrer (World Circuit/Nonesuch)
- Irving Fine
- Flea (musician)
- Fleet Foxes
- Ben Folds
- Bill Frisell

== G ==
- Manuel Galbán
- Kenny Garrett
- George Gershwin
- Ira Gershwin
- Rhiannon Giddens
- Gilberto Gil
- João Gilberto
- Jimmie Dale Gilmore
- Gipsy Kings
- Philip Glass
- Rubén González (World Circuit/Nonesuch)
- Richard Goode
- Michael Gordon
- Ricky Ian Gordon
- Henryk Górecki
- The Gothic Archies
- Jonny Greenwood
- Adam Guettel
- Mark Guiliana

== H ==
- Idjah Hadidjah
- Jim Hall
- Tigran Hamasyan
- John Harbison
- Emmylou Harris
- Kevin Hays
- Julius Hemphill
- Fred Hersch
- Robin Holcomb
- Mieczysław Horszowski
- Wayne Horvitz
- Hurray for the Riff Raff

== I ==
- Iron & Wine

== J ==
- Wanda Jackson
- Paul Jacobs
- James Farm
- Jonnie Johnson

== K ==
- Gabriel Kahane
- Gilbert Kalish
- Giya Kancheli
- Gaby Kerpel
- Igor Kipnis
- Leon Kirchner
- Glenn Kotche
- Viktor Krauss
- Gidon Kremer
- Kremerata Baltica
- Ramnad Krishnan
- Kronos Quartet

== L ==
- Lianne La Havas
- Lake Street Dive
- k.d. lang
- Ruth Laredo
- Last Forever
- Lorraine Hunt Lieberson
- Cheikh Lô (World Circuit/Nonesuch)
- Orlando "Cachaito" López (World Circuit/Nonesuch)
- Los Zafiros (World Circuit/Nonesuch)
- The Low Anthem
- Sergiu Luca

== M ==
- Yo-Yo Ma
- The Magnetic Fields
- Clint Mansell
- Mariza
- Ingram Marshall
- Jessica Lea Mayfield
- Audra McDonald
- Bobby McFerrin
- Kate and Anna McGarrigle
- Brad Mehldau
- Natalie Merchant
- Stephin Merritt
- Pat Metheny
- Edgar Meyer
- Manuel "Guajiro" Mirabal (World Circuit/Nonesuch)
- Joni Mitchell
- Ivan Moravec
- Joan Morris
- Jelly Roll Morton
- Nico Muhly
- Le Mystère des Voix Bulgares

== N ==
- Youssou N'Dour
- New Jersey Percussion Ensemble
- New York City Ballet Orchestra
- Randy Newman
- Thomas Newman
- Nickel Creek
- Alex North

== O ==
- Paul O'Dette
- Christopher O'Riley
- Conor Oberst
- Odessa Balalaikas
- Offa Rex (The Decemberists + Olivia Chaney
- Orchestra Baobab (World Circuit/Nonesuch)
- Fernando Otero

== P ==
- Eddie Palmieri
- Andrzej Panufnik
- Carlos Paredes
- Mandy Patinkin
- Nicholas Payton
- Krzysztof Penderecki
- George Perle
- Sam Phillips
- Ástor Piazzolla
- Robert Plant
- Pokrovsky Ensemble
- Omara Portuondo (World Circuit/Nonesuch)
- Punch Brothers
- Court gamelan of Pura Paku Alaman

== R ==
- Nasser Rastegar-Nejad
- Radio Tarifa (World Circuit/Nonesuch)
- Joshua Redman
- Steve Reich
- Joshua Rifkin
- Karl Ristenpart
- William Neil Roberts
- Leonard Rosenman
- Rostam
- Christopher Rouse
- Rustavi Choir
- Frederic Rzewski

== S ==
- Sabri Brothers
- Nadja Salerno-Sonnenberg
- David Sanborn
- Oumou Sangaré (World Circuit/Nonesuch)
- Gustavo Santaolalla
- Scritti Politti
- Compay Segundo (World Circuit/Nonesuch)
- Philip Selway
- SFJAZZ Collective
- Duncan Sheik
- Sierra Maestra (World Circuit/Nonesuch)
- Dmitry Sitkovetsky
- Stephen Sondheim
- St. Germain
- Teresa Stich-Randall
- Teresa Sterne
- Teresa Stratas
- Morton Subotnick
- Sanford Sylvan

== T ==
- Tōru Takemitsu
- The Tango Project
- Taraf de Haïdouks
- Bob Telson
- Chris Thile
- Virgil Thomson
- Ali Farka Touré (World Circuit/Nonesuch)
- Allen Toussaint
- Rokia Traoré
- Michael Tree
- Jeff Tweedy
- Shye Ben Tzur

== U ==
- Dawn Upshaw

== V ==
- Vagabon
- Värttinä
- Laura Veirs
- Caetano Veloso
- Vladimir Viardo
- Cuong Vu

== W ==
- Sara Watkins
- Wilco
- Brian Wilson
- Daniel Wohl
- Word of Mouth Chorus
- World Saxophone Quartet
- Charles Wuorinen

== X ==
- Iannis Xenakis

== Y ==
- Akiko Yano
- yMusic

== Z ==
- Los Zafiros (World Circuit/Nonesuch)
- Patrick Zimmerli
- John Zorn

== See also ==
- Nonesuch Records
