= Kate & Anna McGarrigle =

Canadian singer-songwriter duo

- Kate (left) and Anna McGarrigle, 1981

Background information
- Origin: Montreal, Quebec, Canada
- Genres: Folk rock; country folk
- Instruments: Vocals; button accordion; banjo; fiddle; guitar; piano; flute; harmonica; keyboard
- Years active: 1975–2010
- Labels: Warner Bros.; Kébec-Disc; Polydor; Private Music; Hannibal; La Tribu; Nonesuch; Omnivore
- Past members: Kate McGarrigle; Anna McGarrigle
- Website: mcgarrigles.com

Kate McGarrigle (February 6, 1946 – January 18, 2010) and Anna McGarrigle (born December 4, 1944) were a duo of folk rock and country folk Canadian singer-songwriters (and sisters) from Quebec, who performed together until Kate's death in 2010.

== Music career ==
In the 1960s, in Montreal, while Kate was studying chemical engineering at McGill University and Anna art at the École des beaux-arts de Montréal, they began performing in public and writing their own songs. From 1963 to 1967, they teamed up with Jack Nissenson and Peter Weldon to form the folk group Mountain City Four.

Their songs have been covered by a variety of artists including Linda Ronstadt, Emmylou Harris, Judy Collins, and others. These covers led to the McGarrigles getting their first recording contract in 1974. They released their eponymous debut album in 1976, (Note: Various sources use the album's recording date of '1975' also as the release date, but several reliable sources in books and newspaper articles, both in the US and the UK, indicate or cite '1976' and 'January 1976' as the release date.) and created nine more albums through 2008.

Although associated with Quebec's anglophone community, they also recorded and performed many songs in French. Two of their albums, Entre la jeunesse et la sagesse and La vache qui pleure, are entirely in French.

Their version of Wade Hemsworth's song, "The Log Driver's Waltz", became famous as the soundtrack for a 1979 animated film directed by John Weldon at Canada's National Film Board. They provided backing vocals on Nick Cave and the Bad Seeds's 2001 album No More Shall We Part.

They continued to write, record and perform music into the 21st century, with assorted accompanying artists including Gerry Conway, Pat Donaldson, Ken Pearson, Michel Pépin, Chaim Tannenbaum, and Joel Zifkin.

== Personal lives ==
Anna and Kate McGarrigle were born in Montreal of mixed Irish and French-Canadian background. Their parents, Frank McGarrigle and Gabrielle Latrémouille, were both passionate about music and raised them and their older sister Jane in the tradition of family singing that would come to define their careers.

They grew up in Saint-Sauveur, where they learned piano from nuns. In 1971, Kate married the singer-songwriter Loudon Wainwright III. Their children, Rufus and Martha, are also both singers. The two divorced in 1976. Kate McGarrigle died in 2010, aged 63, of sarcoma, a rare form of cancer.

Anna McGarrigle was married to Canadian journalist and author Dane Lanken until his death on March 3, 2023. The couple had two children, Lily Lanken and Sylvan Lanken, and lived in North Glengarry, Ontario, just west of the Quebec border. Dane appeared as a vocalist on several of the sisters' albums and in 2007 wrote their career biography. Their sister Jane (1941–2025), was a film and television composer who acted as business manager for Kate and Anna, and also wrote and performed several songs with the duo.

== Honours and awards ==
They were appointed Members of the Order of Canada in 1993 and received the Governor General's Performing Arts Award in 2004. On November 22, 2006, they received the Lifetime Achievement Award at the 2006 SOCAN Awards in Toronto.

They received the 2010 Mojo Roots Award, which was presented by Emmylou Harris. The award was accepted by Anna together with Kate's children Rufus and Martha Wainwright, as Kate had died early that year on January 18.

== Discography ==
=== Albums ===
- Kate & Anna McGarrigle (1976) – Sweden No. 27
- Dancer with Bruised Knees (1977) – U.K. No. 35, Canada No. 43
- Pronto Monto (1978)
- Entre la jeunesse et la sagesse (1980) – also known by the title French Record
- Love Over and Over (1982)
- Heartbeats Accelerating (1990) – Canada No. 61
- Matapédia (1996) – Canada No. 49; winner of 1997 Juno Award for Roots & Traditional Album of the Year – Group)
- The McGarrigle Hour (1998) – winner of 1999 Juno Award for Roots & Traditional Album of the Year – Group)
- La vache qui pleure (2003)
- The McGarrigle Christmas Hour (2005)
- ODDiTTiES (2010)
- Tell My Sister (2011)
- Sing Me the Songs: Celebrating the Works of Kate McGarrigle (2013)
- Toronto May '82 (unofficial) (2016)
- Tant Le Monde: Live in Bremen, Germany, 2005 (2022)

=== With other artists ===
- Album II by Loudon Wainwright (1971), Kate McGarrigle – vocals on "Old Paint"
- Attempted Mustache by Loudon Wainwright, Kate McGarrigle – banjo and vocals
- Waitress in a Donut Shop by Maria Muldaur (1974) – "Cool River", "Travelin' Shoes (Kate only)"
- Prisoner in Disguise by Linda Ronstadt (1975) – "You Tell Me That I'm Falling Down"
- Unrequited by Loudon Wainwright, Kate & Anna McGarrigle, vocals.
- Sunnyvista by Richard and Linda Thompson (1979) – "You're Gonna Need Somebody", "Sisters", "Traces of My Love"
- Bluebird by Emmylou Harris (1989) – "Love Is"
- Songs of the Civil War (1991) – "Was My Brother in the Battle?", "Better Times Are Coming", "Hard Times Come Again No More"
- The Bells of Dublin (1991) – "Il Est Né/Ca Berger" with The Chieftains
- 'Til Their Eyes Shine (The Lullaby Album) (1992) – "Lullaby For A Doll"
- History by Loudon Wainwright, Kate & Anna McGarrigle, vocals.
- Wrecking Ball by Emmylou Harris (1995) – "Going Back To Harlan", "Waltz Across Texas Tonight"
- Live at the World Cafe: Volume 9 (1999) – "DJ Serenade"
- Western Wall: The Tucson Sessions by Emmylou Harris and Linda Ronstadt (1999) – "All I Left Behind You", "1917", "Sisters of Mercy"
- Red Dirt Girl by Emmylou Harris (2000) – "J'Ai Fait Tout" (Kate only, instrumentals), "Boy From Tupelo" (Kate only, vocals)
- No More Shall We Part by Nick Cave and the Bad Seeds (2001)
- Stumble into Grace by Emmylou Harris (2003) – "I Will Dream", "Little Bird", "O Evangeline", "Cup of Kindness" (Kate only)
- Martha Wainwright by Martha Wainwright, Kate McGarrigle – banjo (track 3), piano (track 6).
- Leonard Cohen: I'm Your Man Soundtrack (2006) – "Winter Lady" (with Martha Wainwright)
- All I Intended to Be by Emmylou Harris (2008) – "Moon Song", "Sailing 'Round The Room", "How She Could Sing the Wildwood Flower"
- I Know You're Married But I've Got Feelings Too by Martha Wainwright, Anna McGarrigle – keyboard, synths and background vocals (12), Kate McGarrigle – hand claps (2), Wurlitzer (12), backing vocals (12)
- Northern Songs: Canada's Best and Brightest (2008) – "Entre Lajeunesse et la Sagesse"
- Easy Come, Easy Go by Marianne Faithfull (2008) – Kate & Anna McGarrigle vocals on "Flandyke Shore"
- Ring Them Bells by Joan Baez – "Willie Moore" (Traditional) Baez, Kate, and Anna McGarrigle vocals; Baez guitar, Kate McGarrigle banjo, Anna McGarrigle accordion.

== Filmography ==
=== DVDs ===
- The McGarrigle Hour (1999) – with Rufus Wainwright, Martha Wainwright, Loudon Wainwright, Chaim Tannenbaum, Jane McGarrigle, Emmylou Harris, Linda Ronstadt and Lily Lanken).
- 2009 – A Not So Silent Night (2009) – with Rufus and Martha Wainwright.

=== Film work ===
- The Log Driver's Waltz (1979) – an NFB animated short of the Wade Hemsworth song directed by John Weldon
- The sisters were the subject of an eponymous documentary film directed by Caroline Leaf. (1981)
- Sharon, Lois & Bram's Elephant Show (1987) – appeared as themselves on the episode "Sibling Rivalry".
- Blackfly (1991) – back up vocals on a Wade Hemsworth performance of the song featured in the animated film by Christopher Hinton.
- Before Tomorrow (Le Jour avant le lendemain) (2008) – a Canadian drama film, adapted from the novel Før morgendagen by Danish writer Jørn Riel.

== Bibliography ==
- Lanken, Dane (2007). Kate and Anna McGarrigle Songs and Stories. Canada: Penumbra Press. ISBN 978-1-897323-04-5.
- Lanken, Dane (2007). Thirty-three Kate and Anna McGarrigle Songs. Canada: Penumbra Press. ISBN 978-1-897323-05-2.
- McGarrigle, Anna; McGarrigle, Jane (2015). Mountain City Girls. Canada: Penguin Random House. ISBN 978-0-345-81402-9.
