= Lian Lunson =

Australian actress (born 1959)

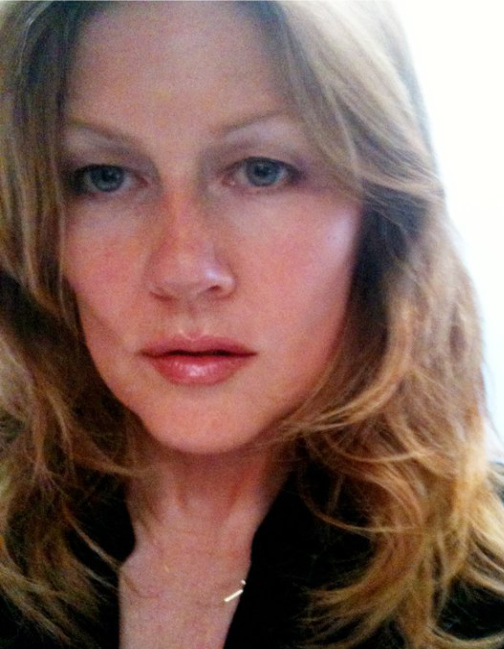
- Born: Lian Lunson; 3 February 1959 (age 67); Melbourne, Victoria, Australia
- Occupations: Actress, writer, and filmmaker
- Notable work: Leonard Cohen: I'm Your Man

Lian Lunson (born 3 February 1959) is an Australian actress who became a filmmaker and author.

== Biography ==
Lian Lunson was born in Victoria, Australia. After attending The Ensemble drama school in Sydney and working as an actor, she moved to Los Angeles in 1987 to join the film industry. Lunson produced commercials and music videos, and in 1997 opened her own production company based in LA, Horse Pictures. At the request of Island Records, Lian made a video for Willie Nelson in Ireland for his Spirit album. For the song 'She Is Gone', she also made a 15-minute electronic press kit. It was at that time that Lian took Nelson to meet U2 at their studio in Dublin. Whilst there, U2 and Nelson recorded the song 'Slow Dancing', which was captured on film by Lunson and used in the documentary that she would make for Willie called, Willie Nelson: Down Home. It aired in 1997 on PBS.

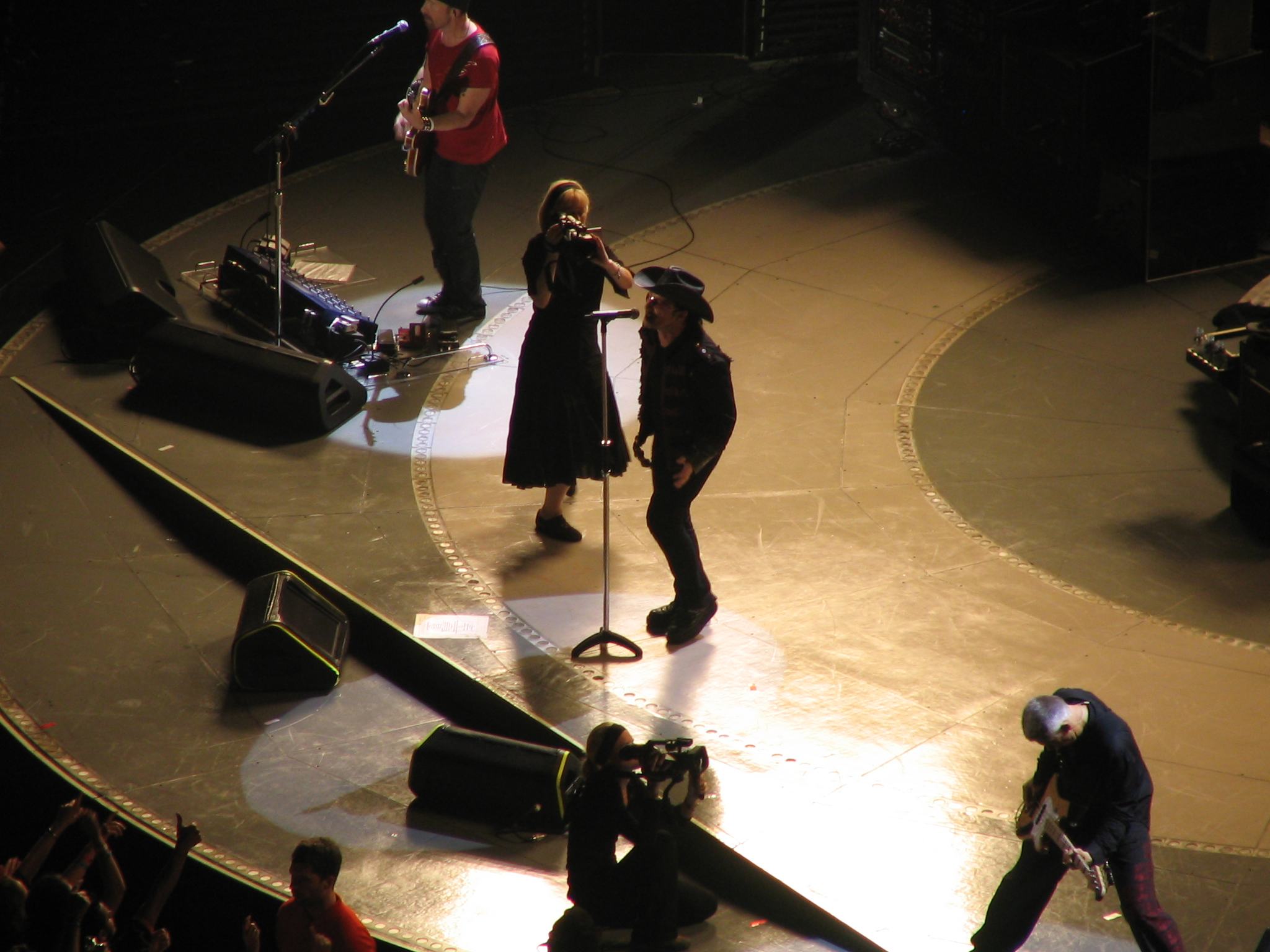
Lian Lunson films U2 in Toronto

She also produced The Passion of the Christ: Songs Inspired By, an alternate soundtrack to the Mel Gibson film. Gibson would go on to produce Lunson's documentary about the poet and singer/songwriter Leonard Cohen, called Leonard Cohen: I'm Your Man Which released in 2005. During production, she met Kate & Anna McGarrigle, subject of Lunson's next documentary, Sing Me the Songs That Say I Love You: A Concert for Kate McGarrigle. Released in 2012, the film chronicles a tribute concert that happened in New York following Kate's 2010 death, and was produced by Kate's musician son Rufus Wainwright. In 2006, she was awarded the Women in Film Dorothy Arzner Directors Award for her work on this film. Lunson made her feature film debut with Waiting for the Miracle to Come, filmed in Willie Nelson's hometown of Spicewood, Texas, and features Nelson, Charlotte Rampling and Sophie Lowe. Wim Wenders and Bono were executive producers, with Bono also contributing a song performed by Nelson.

== Filmography ==
=== Actress ===
Year	Title	Credit	Type
1985	A Street to Die	Receptionist	Feature film
1985	The Big Hurt	Lisa	Feature film
1986	Dogs in Space	Grant's Girl	Feature film
1986	Army Wives	Wendy	TV series

=== Crew ===
Year	Title	Credit
1997	Willie Nelson: Down Home (TV documentary)	Director/Writer/Producer
2004	I'm Only Looking: The Best of INXS (video documentary)	Producer (segment: "Time" )
2005	Leonard Cohen: I'm Your Man	Director/Writer/Producer
2007	Across the Universe	Special Thanks
2012	Sing Me the Songs That Say I Love You: A Concert for Kate McGarrigle	Director/Writer
2016	Waiting for the Miracle to Come	Director/Writer/Producer
