= Mountain City Four =

Canadian folk music group

- Origin: Montreal, Quebec, Canada
- Genres: Folk
- Years active: 1963–1967
- Past members: Jack Nissenson; Peter Weldon; Kate McGarrigle; Anna McGarrigle

The Mountain City Four were a Canadian folk music group, based in Montreal and active from 1963 to 1967. The group consisted of Jack Nissenson, Peter Weldon, Kate McGarrigle, and Anna McGarrigle. They are primarily remembered for popularizing a number of songs by Wade Hemsworth, including the National Film Board animated short The Log Driver's Waltz, as well as for Nissenson's recording of Bob Dylan's 1962 Finjan Club concert in Montreal.

== History ==
The Mountain City Four formed in 1963 when the McGarrigle sisters were attending college in Montreal. The band performed in coffeehouses and for dances in the city. The participation of the Mountain City Four (as a group, and as individuals with others) during the early years of the Montreal Folk Workshop (launched 1965 at its original venue of Moose Hall, on Avenue du Parc) helped to promote this venue which became gathering place for emerging folk musicians, lasting well into the next decade.

In 1966, the band recorded music for the documentary film Helicopter Canada, which was nominated for an Academy Award for best documentary film.

== See also ==
- List of bands from Canada
