= Michael Breen (musician) =

Canadian singer and session musician

- Born: Michel Pépin; 1960 (age 65–66); Nicolet, Quebec
- Genres: rock, pop
- Occupation: Singer
- Instrument: Vocals
- Years active: 1980s
- Label: Alert Records

Michael Breen is the former stage name of Michel Pépin (born 1960 in Nicolet, Quebec), a Canadian pop and rock singer and session musician. Although he released only one album as a solo artist, he had a hit single with "Rain" in 1987, and received a Juno Award nomination for Most Promising Male Vocalist at the Juno Awards of 1989.

Pépin first moved to Montreal at age 17 to pursue work in the music industry. He released one album with the band Concert in 1982. Although a francophone, he was more interested in pursuing stardom in the much larger English-language market than in limiting himself to the French language music scene in Quebec, and worked with Bill Sweetman and Geoff Hughes to write and record English language songs. Their first collaboration, "Face to Face", was a finalist in the 1985 National Talent Search sponsored by Music Express and MuchMusic.

He signed to Alert Records, and under the stage name Michael Breen he released a self-titled album on the label in 1987. Two singles, "Rain" and "How Will I Know", were released from the album. "Rain", which was written by Sass Jordan, was a Top 40 hit in RPM, peaking at No. 33 the week of November 21, 1987, but the album was only a modest seller, peaking at No. 91 in the week of November 7.

His video for "Rain" garnered a Prix Félix nomination for Best Video in 1988, and he was nominated for Most Promising Male Vocalist at the Juno Awards in 1989.

Pépin never released another album as a solo artist, although he continued in the music business as a session guitarist for artists such as Luba, Kate and Anna McGarrigle, Sarah McLachlan, Martha Wainwright, Emmylou Harris and Jean Leloup.
