= Philippe Tatartcheff =

Canadian poet and songwriter

- Born: Geneva, Switzerland
- Origin: Ontario, Canada
- Occupations: Poet, songwriter

Philippe Tatartcheff (born in Geneva, Switzerland) is a Canadian poet and songwriter. He is best known as the lyricist who wrote French language songs recorded by folk duo Kate & Anna McGarrigle.

== Origins and early life ==
Tatartcheff's family was originally from the Swiss Cantons of Geneva, Vaud, Neuchatel and Fribourg. After moving to Montreal in the early 1950s, they eventually settled in Timmins, Ontario, where his father, Dr. Michael Tatartcheff, was a physician and surgeon, and the town doctor. His grandfather, Dr. Assen Tatartcheff, was a member of the Macedonian Liberation Front IMRE.

Tatartcheff attended a French collège classique in Timmins, then McGill University before leaving for Paris in early 1969, to study for a master's in French literature at the Sorbonne, where he presented a thesis on the subject of Jules Vallès. While at McGill, he met Anna McGarrigle, who was studying at Beaux-Arts at the time (1964-1968).

== Career ==
In 1974, after Tatartcheff's return to Montreal, Anna McGarrigle asked him to help her write a song, which became "Complainte pour Ste. Catherine", featured on the sisters' debut album, Kate & Anna McGarrigle As McGarrigle recalled many years later:

In late spring of 1973, [...] I wrote a song in French on the accordion about Henri Richard, the Montreal Canadiens's beloved captain, with Richard Baker, a young musician from BC. [...] The idea was to release it in time for the 1974 hockey playoffs, but we needed another French song for the B-side and I asked Philippe, now back in Montreal, to help me write something. The song we banged out was "Complainte pour Ste. Catherine." It took us all of twenty minutes. [...] Most people who heard "Complainte pour Ste. Catherine" liked it, and when Kate and I were signed to Warner Brothers a while later, our producer, Joe Boyd, wanted us to re-record it.

— Anna McGarrigle, Mountain City Girls by Anna & Jane McGarrigle.

Tatartcheff would go on to contribute a total of twenty-four songs recorded by the McGarrigle sisters, most of them in French.

At some stage, he also became a farmer in Dunham, Quebec, according to the sleeve notes of the album The McGarrigle Hour.

== List of songs ==
with Anna McGarrigle

- "Complainte pour Ste. Catherine"
- "Naufragée du Tendre"
- "Mais quand tu danses"
- "Excursion à Venise"
- "Avant la guerre"
- "À boire"
- "Rainbow Ride"
- "Arbre"
- "Forever and the Same"

with Kate McGarrigle

- "Side of Fries"
- "Entre Lajeunesse et la sagesse"
- "Cheminant à la ville"

with both Kate and Anna McGarrigle

- "Prends ton manteau" (a.k.a. "Pronto Monto")
- "La valse du maître draveur", performed by the Mountain City Four (Written by Wade Hemsworth & translated into French by Philippe Tatartcheff)
- "Hang Out Your Heart"
- "Petite annonce amoureuse"
- "Ah tournesol"
- "Hurle le vent"
- "La Vache qui pleure"
- "Rose blanche"
- "Tant le monde"
- "Ce matin"
- "Dans le silence"

solo (recorded by Kate and Anna McGarrigle)

- "DJ Serenade"

solo

- "Country Bar, Northern Star"
- "Sans coeur et sans béquille"

== Videos ==
Tatartcheff has also uploaded some videos:

- "Approaching Montreal" (2011)
- "Cows in Snow" (2008)
- "Dogs in Snow" (2008)
- "Frelighsburg morning" (2008)

== Bibliography ==
- Lanken, Dane (2007). Kate and Anna McGarrigle Songs and Stories. Canada: Penumbra Press. ISBN 978-18-9732-304-5.
- Lanken, Dane (2007). Thirty-three Kate and Anna McGarrigle Songs. Canada: Penumbra Press. ISBN 978-18-9732-305-2.
- McGarrigle, Anna & Jane (2015). Mountain City Girls. Canada: Penguin Random House. ISBN 978-0-345-81402-9.
