= Jane McGarrigle =

Canadian musician (1941–2025)

- Born: April 26, 1941; Montreal, Quebec, Canada
- Died: January 24, 2025 (aged 83)
- Occupations: Musician, music publisher

Laury Jane McGarrigle (April 26, 1941 – January 24, 2025) was a Canadian musician and music publisher, known mainly for her work with her younger sisters, singers Kate & Anna McGarrigle. She was the co-author of a book about the three sisters' childhood and musical experiences.

== Early and personal life ==
McGarrigle was born and grew up in Montreal, Quebec, with her sisters Kate and Anna.

After an early marriage to David Dow, with whom she had two children, in the 1960s, she returned to Montreal after the couple's divorce. She was later in a common law relationship with Peter Weldon, who had been a bandmate of her sisters in Mountain City Four.

She died on January 24, 2025, aged 83, of ovarian cancer.

== Career ==
When McGarrigle's younger sisters formed a singer-songwriter duo, Kate & Anna McGarrigle, Jane wrote and performed several songs with them, including the organ parts on their debut album.

She produced their album Love Over and Over.

The song "Love Is", which she co-wrote, has been recorded by Nana Mouskouri, Emmylou Harris, and Renato Russo (who also recorded the co-written "Man Is an Island"). She served as her sisters' music manager for a time, and also managed producers Pierre Marchand (Sarah McLachlan) and Robbi Finkel (Cirque du Soleil) and the group Three O'Clock Train, as well as singer-songwriters Perry Blake and Carole Pope.

McGarrigle co-composed, with her sisters, the scores to the Canadian film Tommy Tricker and the Stamp Traveller and its sequel The Return of Tommy Tricker.

She appeared in the 1999 film The McGarrigle Hour, a collection of concert footage.

McGarrigle was a member of the Society of Composers, Authors and Music Publishers of Canada (SOCAN) and served on its board of directors from 1990 to 2000. She was also on the board of the Songwriters Association of Canada. In 2013, she was part of a SOCAN representative group for a streamed panel, "Can the Music Industry be Saved?"

With her sister Anna, she co-authored Mountain City Girls, a family memoir published in 2015 by Random House Canada. The book contains stories about the childhood and musical careers of the three sisters.
