= Dane Lanken =

Canadian journalist and author (1945–2023)

- Born: December 9, 1945; Montreal, Quebec, Canada
- Died: March 3, 2023 (aged 77); Cornwall, Ontario, Canada
- Occupation(s): Journalist, author
- Spouse: Anna McGarrigle
- Children: 2

Dane Lanken (December 9, 1945 – March 3, 2023) was a Canadian journalist and author.

== Career ==
Lanken was a film critic for the Montreal Gazette from 1967 to 1977, and was then a freelance journalist who wrote regularly for Canadian Geographic, among other publications such as Glengarry Life, the annual volume of the Glengarry Historical Society.

Lanken wrote Montreal Movie Palaces: Great Theatres of the Golden Era 1884 - 1938, which includes photographs by Brian Merrett and Julie Greto. In 2007 he wrote the career biography of folksingers Kate & Anna McGarrigle.

== Personal life and death ==
Lanken was married to singer-songwriter Anna McGarrigle, and had appeared as a vocalist on several of her albums with her sister Kate McGarrigle. McGarrigle and Lanken had two children, Lily Lanken and Sylvan Lanken, and lived near the Eastern Ontario town of Alexandria, in North Glengarry.

Lanken died on March 3, 2023.
