= Chaim Tannenbaum =

Canadian folk musician and academic

- Born: Montreal, Quebec, Canada
- Genre: Folk
- Occupations: Musician; Academic; Philosopher
- Instruments: Vocals; Guitar; Banjo
- Years active: 1960s–present
- Label: StorySound Records

Academic background
- Education: McGill University; University of London

Academic work
- Discipline: Philosophy
- Institutions: Dawson College

Chaim Tannenbaum is a Canadian folk musician and academic. A longtime collaborator of Kate and Anna McGarrigle and Loudon Wainwright III, he released his own self-titled solo debut album in 2016, and won the Canadian Folk Music Award for Traditional Singer of the Year at the 12th Canadian Folk Music Awards.

Born and raised in Montreal, Quebec, where he was a friend of Kate McGarrigle since high school, Tannenbaum studied philosophy and logic at McGill University and the University of London, and taught philosophy at Dawson College throughout his career. Despite his talent in music and his regular work with Wainwright and the McGarrigles, he made no attempt to record his own music until age 68, after retiring from teaching and moving to New York City. Released by StorySound Records, the album included a few original songs but consisted primarily of his renditions of traditional folk numbers, as well as a cover of the McGarrigles' "(Talk to Me of) Mendocino" recorded as a duet with Wainwright.

In 2017, he followed up with a non-album recording of "America the Beautiful".
