= Dedicated to the One I Love (album) =

Studio album by Linda Ronstadt
- Released: June 25, 1996
- Recorded: September 1995 – January 1996 at The Simplex (except for 'Winter Light' which was recorded in 1993 at the Skywalker Ranch.)
- Genre: Lullaby; children's music
- Length: 29:21
- Label: Elektra, Rhino, Flashback
- Producer: George Massenburg, Linda Ronstadt

Linda Ronstadt chronology
| Feels Like Home (1995) | Dedicated to the One I Love (1996) | We Ran (1998) |

Dedicated to the One I Love is an album of rock classics reinterpreted as children's lullabies by American singer, songwriter and producer Linda Ronstadt. It subsequently became known to fans as 'The Lullaby Album'.

Released in mid-1996, it reached No. 78 and lasted three months on the main Billboard album chart. It also earned the singer a new career distinction when it hit #1 on the Top Kid Audio chart. It was awarded a 1997 Grammy Award.

The album includes vocal contributions from long-time collaborators Aaron Neville who duets on Brahms' Lullaby and Valerie Carter who provides harmony vocals on most tracks. One track is a re-recording of "Winter Light", the title track of her 1993 album.

This album was reissued on Rhino's Flashback Records label in 2009. It is now out of print.

== Critical reception ==
Professional ratings
Review scores
| Source | Rating |
|---|---|
| AllMusic | 2.5/5 stars |
| Entertainment Weekly | B− |
| The Rolling Stone Album Guide | 2/5 stars |

AllMusic critic Stephen Thomas Erlewine wrote: "All of the songs are given lush, sweet, and soft arrangements, even when that approach is ludicrous; it might be a cute idea to deliver Queen's 'We Will Rock You' as a rock-a-bye chant, but in practice it is simply ridiculous… the appeal of Dedicated to the One I Love is limited..."

== Track listing ==
| No. | Title | Writer(s) | Length |
|---|---|---|---|
| 1. | "Dedicated to the One I Love" | Ralph Bass, Lowman Pauling | 2:10 |
| 2. | "Be My Baby" | Phil Spector, Jeff Barry, Ellie Greenwich | 3:16 |
| 3. | "In My Room" | Brian Wilson, Gary Usher | 2:18 |
| 4. | "Devoted to You" | Felice Bryant, Boudleaux Bryant | 2:24 |
| 5. | "Baby, I Love You" | Spector, Barry, Greenwich | 2:56 |
| 6. | "Devoted to You" (instrumental) | Bryant, Bryant | 0:48 |
| 7. | "Angel Baby" | Rosie Hamlin | 3:15 |
| 8. | "We Will Rock You" | Brian May | 1:29 |
| 9. | "Winter Light" | Eric Kaz, Linda Ronstadt, Zbigniew Preisner | 3:17 |
| 10. | "Brahms' Lullaby" | Johannes Brahms | 3:37 |
| 11. | "Good Night" | John Lennon, Paul McCartney | 3:51 |
| Total length: | | | 29:21 |

== Personnel ==
- Linda Ronstadt – lead vocals (1–5, 7–11), harmony vocals (1–3, 5, 8), string arrangements (1, 5, 7), arrangements (8, 10), backing vocals (9)
- Robbie Buchanan – synthesizers (3, 9), synthesizer voices (8), acoustic piano (9)
- Jim Cox – sampled harp (1–4, 6, 7, 10, 11), acoustic piano (5)
- Michelle Sell – harp (1, 3, 5)
- Dennis James – glass harmonica (2, 3, 5, 7–10)
- Larry Corbett – cello (1–3, 5)
- Rebecca Sebring – viola (1–3, 5)
- Jeremy Cohen – violin (1–3, 5)
- Dawn Dover – violin (1–3, 5)
- Joseph Edelberg – violin (1–3, 5)
- Nathan Rubin – violin (1–3, 5)
- James Shallenberger – violin (1–3, 5)
- Margie Butler (of Golden Bough) – Celtic harp (6)
- Janet Ketchum – alto flute (7)
- Angela Koregelos – flute (7)
- Deborah Henry – English horn (7), oboe (7)
- David Campbell – string arrangements (1, 3, 5, 7, 11), conductor (1–3, 5, 10, 11), arrangements (10)
- Valerie Carter – harmony vocals (1, 2, 5, 8), lead vocals (4), backing vocals (9)
- Aaron Neville – lead vocals (10)

The Skywalker Symphony Orchestra

- David Schoenbrun – bass
- Stephen Tramontozzi – bass
- Larry Corbett – cello (principle)
- Jennifer Culp – cello
- Nina Flyer – cello
- Lawrence Granger – cello
- Eileen Moon – cello
- Janet Witharm – cello
- Janet Ketchum – alto flute, flute
- Angela Koregelos – alto flute, flute
- Deborah Henry – English horn, oboe
- Susan Bates – viola
- Don Ehrlich – viola
- Ruth Freeman – viola (principle)
- Pam Freund – viola
- James Hurley – viola
- Betsy London – viola
- Rebecca Sebring – viola
- Nanci Severance – viola
- Jenny Bifano – violin
- Paul Brancato – violin
- Jeremy Cohen – violin, concertmaster
- Jeremy Constant – violin
- Dawn Dover – violin
- Adrienne Duckworth – violin
- Joseph Edelberg – violin
- Ronald Erickson – violin
- Doris Fukawa – violin
- Darlene Gray – violin
- Byung Kim – violin
- Mia Kim – violin
- Virginia Price-Kvistad – violin
- Nathan Rubin – violin
- James Shallenberger – violin
- Dan Smiley – violin
- Mariko Smiley – violin
- Nadya Tichman – violin

== Production ==
- George Massenburg – producer, engineer, mixing
- Linda Ronstadt – producer, liner notes
- Kevin Scott – mix assistant
- John Allair – piano technician
- Doug Sax – mastering at The Mastering Lab (Hollywood, California).
- John Kosh – art direction, design, front cover photography
- Danny Ferrington – artwork, back cover photography, interior photography
- Rosie Santos – artwork, back cover photography, interior photography
- Robert Blakeman – photography (of Linda Ronstadt)
- Marlene McLoughlin – angel illustration
- Gail Rosman – production coordinator
- Greg Sudmeier – orchestra coordinator
- John Brenes – production archivist

== Charts ==
| Chart (1996) | Peak position |
|---|---|
| Australian Albums (ARIA) | 190 |

== Release history ==
Release history and formats for Dedicated to the One I Love
| Region | Date | Format | Label | Ref. |
|---|---|---|---|---|
| North America | June 25, 1996 | CD; cassette | Elektra Records | |
