= For Sentimental Reasons (Linda Ronstadt album) =

Studio album by Linda Ronstadt
- Released: September 22, 1986
- Recorded: July 10, 1985 – May 16, 1986
- Genres: Jazz; big band; traditional pop; lounge
- Length: 42:10
- Label: Asylum
- Producer: Peter Asher

Linda Ronstadt chronology
| Lush Life (1984) | For Sentimental Reasons (1986) | Trio (1987) |

Singles from For Sentimental Reasons
- 1. "When You Wish Upon a Star" Released: October 1986; 2. "(I Love You) For Sentimental Reasons" Released: April 1987

For Sentimental Reasons is an album by American singer Linda Ronstadt, released in late 1986. The album peaked at #46 on Billboard 200, as well as #3 on the Top Jazz Albums chart.

It was the third consecutive Platinum-certified collaboration between Ronstadt and bandleader/arranger Nelson Riddle and Ronstadt's eleventh million-selling album overall.

== History ==
For Sentimental Reasons was the final installment of the jazz trilogy that Ronstadt recorded with bandleader and arranger Nelson Riddle, who died during the making of this disc. Three of the tracks were conducted by Terry Woodson. The album's premier single release, "When You Wish Upon a Star", peaked at #32 in Billboard Magazine's Adult Contemporary chart at the end of 1986. It was assisted by a popular music video. John Kosh designed the album covers for the trilogy of albums Ronstadt recorded with Nelson Riddle.

All tracks were also included in the compilation "'Round Midnight", released on Asylum Records later in 1986.

== Reception ==
Professional ratings
Review scores
| Source | Rating |
|---|---|
| Allmusic | 2/5 stars |
| The Rolling Stone Album Guide | 3/5 stars |

In his retrospective Allmusic review, critic Stephen Thomas Erlewine called the album "virtually indistinguishable from its two predecessors—it has the same sweeping arrangements, and her voice remains adequate, if not spectacular."

== Track listing ==
| No. | Title | Writer(s) | Length |
|---|---|---|---|
| 1. | "When You Wish Upon a Star" | Leigh Harline, Ned Washington | 3:46 |
| 2. | "Bewitched, Bothered and Bewildered" | Lorenz Hart, Richard Rodgers | 4:24 |
| 3. | "You Go to My Head" | J. Fred Coots, Haven Gillespie | 3:36 |
| 4. | "But Not for Me" | George Gershwin, Ira Gershwin | 5:24 |
| 5. | "My Funny Valentine" | Hart, Rodgers | 3:00 |
| 6. | "I Get Along Without You Very Well" | Hoagy Carmichael, Jane Brown Thompson | 4:15 |
| 7. | "Am I Blue?" | Harry Akst, Grant Clarke | 2:54 |
| 8. | "(I Love You) For Sentimental Reasons" | William Best, Deek Watson | 3:42 |
| 9. | "Straighten Up and Fly Right" | Nat King Cole, Irving Mills | 2:15 |
| 10. | "Little Girl Blue" | Hart, Rodgers | 4:35 |
| 11. | "'Round Midnight" | Thelonious Monk, Bernie Hanighen, Cootie Williams | 4:19 |
| Total length: | | | 42:10 |

== Personnel ==
- Linda Ronstadt – vocals
- Don Grolnick – grand piano (1–4, 6–11)
- Bob Mann – guitar (1–6, 8, 10-11)
- Dennis Budimir – guitar (7, 9)
- Bob Magnusson – bass guitar (1–4, 6, 8, 10-11)
- Ray Brown – bass guitar (7, 9)
- John Guerin – drums (1–4, 6, 8, 10-11)
- Louie Bellson – drums (7, 9)
- Warren Luening – trumpet (7, 9)
- Chauncey Welsch – trombone (2-3, 11)
- Plas Johnson – tenor saxophone (4, 6, 10)
- Bud Shank – alto saxophone (8)
- James SK Wān – bamboo flute (6, 8)
- The Sequoia String Quartet – strings (5)
- Nelson Riddle – all arrangements, conductor (1–6, 10-11)
- Terry Woodson – conductor (7–9)
- Mic Bell, Drake Frye, Clifford Holland, Carl Jones – backing vocals (8)
- James Taylor – backing vocals (9)

== Production ==
- Peter Asher – producer
- George Massenburg – engineer, mixing
- Sharon Rice – assistant engineer
- Edd Kolakowski – piano and guitar technician, production assistant
- Doug Sax – mastering at The Mastering Lab (Hollywood, California).
- John Kosh – art direction, design
- Ron Larson – art direction, design
- Robert Blakeman – photography
- Genny Schorr – wardrobe stylist

== Charts ==
| Chart (1986) | Peak position |
|---|---|
| Australia (Kent Music Report) | 43 |
| Canadian RPM Top Albums | 72 |
| United States (Billboard 200) | 46 |

== Certifications ==
| Region | Certification | Certified units/sales |
|---|---|---|
| United States (RIAA) | Platinum | 1,000,000^{^} |
^{^} Shipments figures based on certification alone.

== Release history ==
Release history and formats for For Sentimental Reasons
| Region | Date | Format | Label | Ref. |
|---|---|---|---|---|
| North America | September 22, 1986 | LP; CD; cassette | Asylum Records | |
