= Lush Life (Linda Ronstadt album) =

Studio album by Linda Ronstadt
- Released: November 16, 1984
- Recorded: August 24 – October 5, 1984
- Studios: The Complex, Los Angeles, California
- Genres: Jazz; big band; traditional pop; lounge
- Length: 41:29
- Label: Asylum
- Producer: Peter Asher

Linda Ronstadt chronology
What's New (1983)	Lush Life (1984)	For Sentimental Reasons (1986)

Singles from Lush Life
- 1. "Skylark" Released: December 1984; 2. "When I Fall in Love" Released: March 1985

Lush Life is an album by American singer Linda Ronstadt, released in November 1984 on Asylum Records as the second in a trilogy of jazz albums with bandleader/arranger Nelson Riddle. All three album covers were designed by John Kosh.

The album peaked at #13 on the Billboard 200 and #8 on the Billboard jazz chart, becoming certified as Ronstadt's record tenth platinum album. Lush Life was nominated for two Grammys, Best Female Pop Vocal Performance and Best Album Package, winning the latter. Riddle was posthumously awarded the Grammy for Best Instrumental Arrangement Accompanying A Vocal for the title track, "Lush Life."

A music video was created for the song "Skylark," with vintage clothing by wardrobe stylist Genny Schorr.

In 1986, Asylum Records released the compilation Round Midnight, which included all tracks from all three albums with Riddle.

Professional ratings
Review scores
Source	Rating
AllMusic	2/5 stars
Rolling Stone	2/5 stars

== Track listing ==
No.	Title	Writer(s)	Length
1.	"When I Fall in Love"	Edward Heyman, Victor Young	2:20
2.	"Skylark"	Hoagy Carmichael, Johnny Mercer	3:07
3.	"It Never Entered My Mind"	Lorenz Hart, Richard Rodgers	4:22
4.	"Mean to Me"	Fred E. Ahlert, Roy Turk	4:09
5.	"When Your Lover Has Gone"	Einar Aaron Swan	4:18
6.	"I'm a Fool to Want You"	Joel Herron, Frank Sinatra, Jack Wolf	4:45
7.	"You Took Advantage of Me"	Lorenz Hart, Richard Rodgers	2:21
8.	"Sophisticated Lady"	Duke Ellington, Irving Mills, Mitchell Parish	3:40
9.	"Can't We Be Friends?"	Paul James, Kay Swift	2:28
10.	"My Old Flame"	Sam Coslow, Arthur Johnston	3:33
11.	"Falling in Love Again"	Friedrich Hollaender, Sammy Lerner	2:35
12.	"Lush Life"	Billy Strayhorn	3:51
Total length:			41:29

== Personnel ==
- Linda Ronstadt – vocals
- Nelson Riddle – arrangements and conductor
- Don Grolnick – grand piano, piano solo (11)
- Bob Mann – guitar
- Bob Magnusson – bass guitar
- John Guerin – drums (1–6, 8, 10–12)
- David Frisina – concertmaster, violin (5)

with:

- Tommy Morgan – harmonica (2)
- Tony Terran – trumpet solo (4)
- Plas Johnson – tenor sax solo (5, 7-8)
- Louie Bellson – drums (7, 9)
- Oscar Brashear – trumpet solo (9)
- Chauncey Welsh – trombone solo (10)

== Production ==
- Peter Asher – producer
- George Massenburg – recording, mixing
- Murray Dvorkin – recording assistant, mix assistant
- Doug Sax – mastering at The Mastering Lab (Hollywood, California).
- Gloria Boyce – album coordinator
- John Kosh – art direction, design
- Ron Larson – art direction, design
- Robert Blakeman – photography
- Genny Schorr – wardrobe stylist

== Charts ==
Chart (1984/85)	Peak position
Australia (Kent Music Report)	31
Canadian RPM Top Albums	35
United Kingdom (Official Charts Company)	100
United States (Billboard 200)	13

== Certifications ==
Region	Certification	Certified units/sales
United States (RIAA)	Platinum	1,000,000^{^}
^{^} Shipments figures based on certification alone.

== Release history ==
Release history and formats for Lush Life
Region	Date	Format	Label	Ref.
North America	November 16, 1984	LP; CD; cassette	Asylum Records	
