= We Ran =

Studio album by Linda Ronstadt
- Released: June 23, 1998
- Recorded: 1998
- Studios: The Site (San Rafael, California); Ocean Way (Los Angeles); Jim Brady (Tucson, Arizona)
- Genre: Rock
- Length: 49:28
- Label: Elektra
- Producers: Glyn Johns; Peter Asher; George Massenburg; Waddy Wachtel; Linda Ronstadt

Linda Ronstadt chronology
Dedicated to the One I Love (1996)	We Ran (1998)	Trio II (1999)

Professional ratings
Review scores
Source	Rating
AllMusic	3/5 stars
Entertainment Weekly	B
Rolling Stone	4/5 stars

We Ran is a 1998 rock album by American singer Linda Ronstadt. The disc featured back-up from three members of Tom Petty and The Heartbreakers. It spent two weeks on the Billboard albums chart, peaking at #160.

This disc was taken out of print in 2009.

On this album, Ronstadt interprets a mixture of rock material by various songwriters, including Bruce Springsteen, John Hiatt, and Bob Dylan.

== Track listing ==
No.	Title	Writer(s)	Length
1.	"When We Ran"	John Hiatt	5:08
2.	"If I Should Fall Behind"	Bruce Springsteen	4:06
3.	"Give Me a Reason"	Marion Hall	3:59
4.	"Ruler of My Heart"	Naomi Neville	3:37
5.	"Just Like Tom Thumb's Blues"	Bob Dylan	7:48
6.	"Cry 'Til My Tears Run Dry"	Scott Fagan, Doc Pomus, Mort Shuman	4:01
7.	"I Go to Pieces"	Troy Newman, Waddy Wachtel	3:47
8.	"Heartbreak Kind"	Paul Kennerley, Marty Stuart	3:31
9.	"Damage"	Waddy Wachtel	3:19
10.	"Icy Blue Heart"	John Hiatt	4:57
11.	"Dreams of the San Joaquin"	Jack Wesley Routh, Randy Sharp	5:15
Total length:			49:28

== Personnel ==
- Linda Ronstadt – vocals
- Benmont Tench – acoustic piano (1), Hammond organ (1–3, 5, 8, 10, 11)
- Don Grolnick – keyboards (4)
- Jon Gilutin – organ (4), keyboards (6)
- Robbie Buchanan – synthesizers (7)
- Jim Cox – acoustic piano (9), Hammond organ (9)
- Mike Campbell – lead guitar (1), electric rhythm guitar (1), electric 12-string guitar (2), electric guitars (5, 10), acoustic guitars (8), guitars (11), mandolin (11)
- Andy Fairweather Low – electric rhythm guitar (1), acoustic guitars (2, 11), electric baritone guitar (5), electric guitars (8)
- Waddy Wachtel – electric rhythm guitar (1), electric guitars (3), guitars (7, 9)
- Bernie Leadon – acoustic guitars (2, 10, 11), mandocello (5), electric guitars (8), harmony vocals (8, 10)
- Ethan Johns – mandolin (3), ukulele (3), drums (8), acoustic guitars (10), electric guitars (10)
- Brian Stoltz – guitars (4)
- Fred Tackett – guitars (6)
- Dean Parks – guitars (7)
- Bob Glaub – bass (1, 2, 6, 7, 11)
- James "Hutch" Hutchinson – bass (3, 10)
- Daryl Johnson – bass (4)
- Howie Epstein – bass (5, 8)
- Leland Sklar – bass (9)
- Carlos Vega – drums (1, 4, 5, 9, 11), percussion (2)
- Jim Keltner – drums (3, 10)
- Russ Kunkel – drums (6), percussion (7)
- Plas Johnson – saxophone (4)
- Alexandra Brown – backing vocals (3, 4, 6)
- Mortonette Jenkins – backing vocals (3, 4, 6)
- Marlena Jeter – backing vocals (3, 4, 6)
- Kipp Lennon – backing vocals (7, 9)
- Mark Lennon – backing vocals (7, 9)
- Michael Lennon – backing vocals (7, 9), tambourine (9)
- Michael Ronstadt – harmony vocals (10)
- John Ronstadt – backing vocals (11)
- Melinda Ronstadt – backing vocals (11)
- Peter Ronstadt – backing vocals (11)
- Suzy Ronstadt – backing vocals (11)
- William Ronstadt – backing vocals (11)

== Production ==
- Glyn Johns – producer (1–3, 5, 8, 10, 11), mixing (1–3, 5, 7–11)
- Peter Asher – producer (4, 6)
- George Massenburg – producer (4, 6), engineer (4, 6), mixing (4, 6)
- Linda Ronstadt – producer (6)
- Waddy Wachtel – producer (7, 9)
- Steve Holroyd – engineer (1–3, 5, 8, 10, 11)
- Nathaniel Kunkel – engineer (6, 7, 9)
- Robi Banerji – assistant engineer
- Jim Brady – assistant engineer
- Greg Burns – assistant engineer
- Greg Collins – assistant engineer
- T.K. – assistant engineer
- John Rodenkirch – assistant engineer
- Kevin Scott – assistant engineer
- Alan Sanderson – assistant engineer
- John Sorenson – assistant engineer
- Bob Ludwig – mastering at Gateway Mastering (Portland, Maine)
- Ivy Skoff – project coordinator
- Janet Stark – production assistant
- John Brenes – production archivist
- John Kosh – art direction, design
- Ira Koslow – management

== Charts ==
Chart (1998)	Peak position
Australian Albums (ARIA)	181

== Release history ==
Release history and formats for We Ran
Region	Date	Format	Label	Ref.
North America	June 23, 1998	CD; cassette	Elektra Records	
