= List of Linda Ronstadt performances =

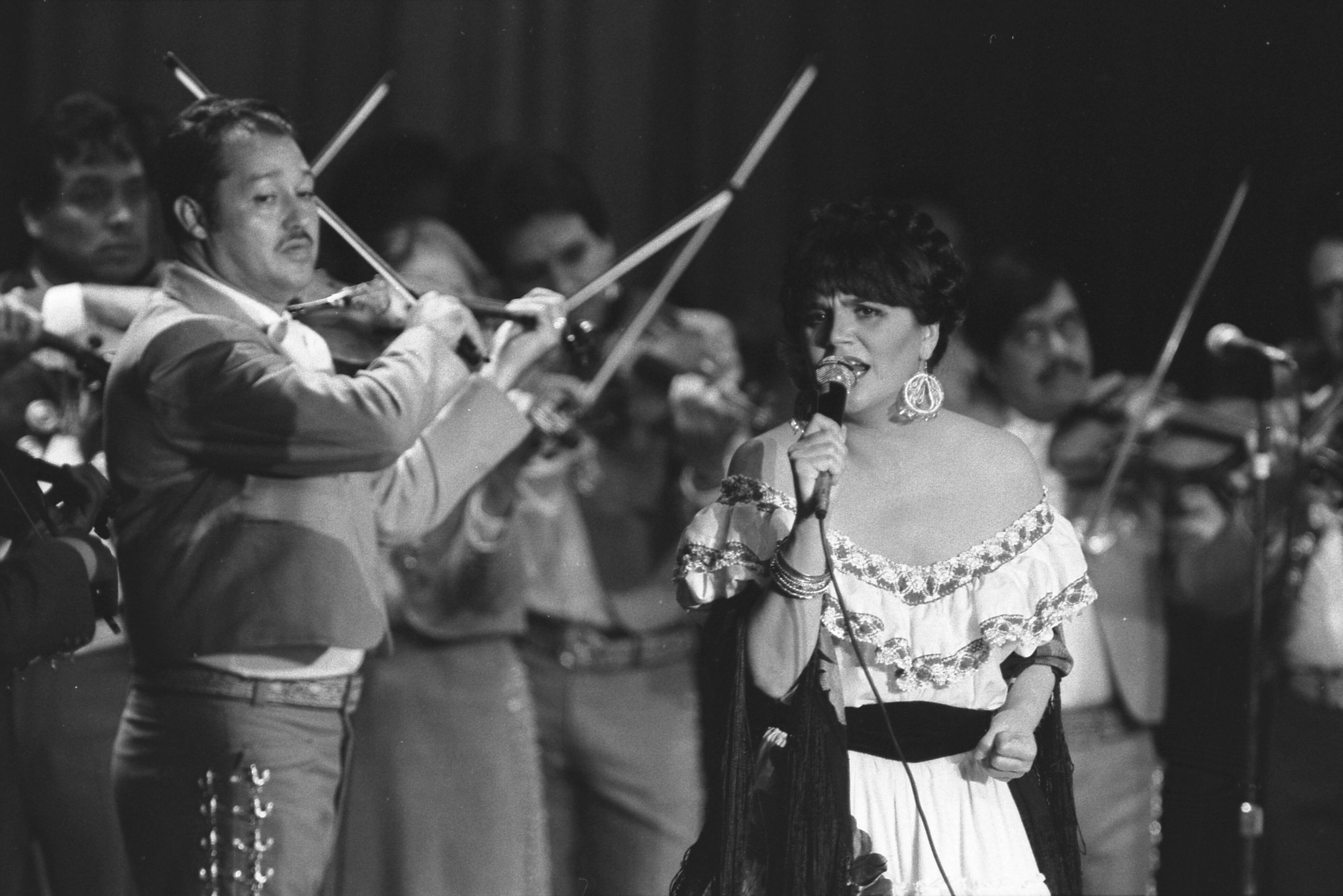
Linda Ronstadt performing at International Festival of Mariachis, California, 1986.

American singer Linda Ronstadt has recorded two video albums, appeared in 18 music videos, appeared in five films, appeared in 11 television programs and has made two stage appearances. Her first music videos appeared in 1982 with the singles "Get Closer", "Lies" and "Tell Him". Ronstadt's further 1980s solo singles like "What's New?" and "When You Wish Upon a Star" also were given their own music videos. Her collaborative singles were also given their own music videos, including "Somewhere Out There" (with James Ingram) and "To Know Him Is to Love Him" (with Emmylou Harris and Dolly Parton). The latter was directed by George Lucas. Further music videos of Ronstadt's work continued through the 1990s with her most recent being "After the Gold Rush". Additionally, two of Ronstadt's concert material was released as video albums during the 1980s.

Ronstadt made her first notable television appearances on Playboy After Dark and The Johnny Cash Show (both in 1969). Her first film appearance occurred in the 1978 movie FM. It would be followed by a film adaptation of The Pirates of Penzance in 1983. She also made four guest appearances on Saturday Night Live in the 1970s and 1980s. Ronstadt also was seen on both The Muppet Show and Sesame Street during the 1980s. During the same decade, Ronstadt made an appearance in the Broadway stage production of The Pirates of Penzance and La bohème. In more recent years, documentaries of her life have appeared including 2019's Linda Ronstadt: The Sound of My Voice.

== Music videos ==
List of music videos, showing year released and director
Title	Year	Director(s)	Ref.
"Get Closer"	1982	Robert Lombard	
"Lies"	1982	Robert Lombard	
"Tell Him"	1982	Robert Lombard	
"I Knew You When"	1982	Robert Lombard	
"What's New?"	1983	—	
"I Don't Stand a Ghost of a Chance with You"	1983	—	
"Good-Bye"	1983	—	
"Skylark"	1985	Robert Lombard	
"You Took Advantage of Me"	1985	Robert Lombard	
"When You Wish Upon a Star"	1986	Michael Smuin	
"Somewhere Out There" (with James Ingram)	1986	Jeffrey Abelson	
"To Know Him Is to Love Him" (with Emmylou Harris and Dolly Parton)	1987	George Lucas	
"Those Memories of You" (with Emmylou Harris and Dolly Parton)	1987	White Copeman	
"Don't Know Much" (with Aaron Neville)	1989	—	
"When Something Is Wrong with My Baby" (with Aaron Neville)	1990	Tom Ackerman	
"Dreams to Dream"	1991	—	
"Heartbeats Accelerating"	1994	—	
"Winter Light"	1994	Walter Murch	
"After the Gold Rush" (with Emmylou Harris and Dolly Parton)	1999	Jim Shea	

== Video albums ==
List of video albums, showing all relevant details
Title	Album details
In Concert – What's New	Released: 1984; Label: Vestron; Formats: LaserDisc, VHS
Canciones De Mi Padre – A Romantic Evening In Old Mexico	Released: 1992; Label: Elektra Video; Formats: VHS

== Films ==
List of film appearances by Linda Ronstadt, showing all relevant details
Title	Year	Role	Notes	Ref.
FM	1978	Herself		
The Pirates of Penzance	1983	Mabel Stanley		
An American Tail	1986	The Balladeer	Voice credit only	
Linda Ronstadt: The Sound of My Voice	2019	Herself	Documentary (In person and archival footage)	
Linda and the Mockingbirds	2020	Herself	Documentary (In person and archival footage)	

== Television ==
List of television appearances by Linda Ronstadt, showing all relevant details
Title	Year	Role	Notes	Ref.
Playboy After Dark	1969–1970	Herself	2 episodes; Musical guest only	
The Johnny Cash Show	1969–1971	Herself	4 episodes	
The Darin Invasion	1970	Herself		
Saturday Night Live	1977–1989	Herself	4 episodes	
The Muppet Show	1980	Herself	One episode	
Corridos! Tales of Passion and Revolution	1987	Adelita	PBS television special	
Great Performances: Canciones de Mi Padre	1989	Herself	PBS television concert special	
Sesame Street	1989	Herself		
Great Performances	1991	Herself	Performer: "La Pastorela"	
The Simpsons	1992	Herself	Cameo appearance; Episode: "Mr. Plow"	
The Young Indiana Jones Chronicles	1993	Peggy	Singing voice only	

== Stage ==
List of stage appearances by Linda Ronstadt, showing all relevant details
Production	Year	Role(s)	Notes	Ref(s)
The Pirates of Penzance	1981	Mabel Stanley	Broadway production	
La bohème	1984	Mimi	Opera; performed at New York Shakespeare Festival	
