= Linda Ronstadt =

American singer (born 1946)

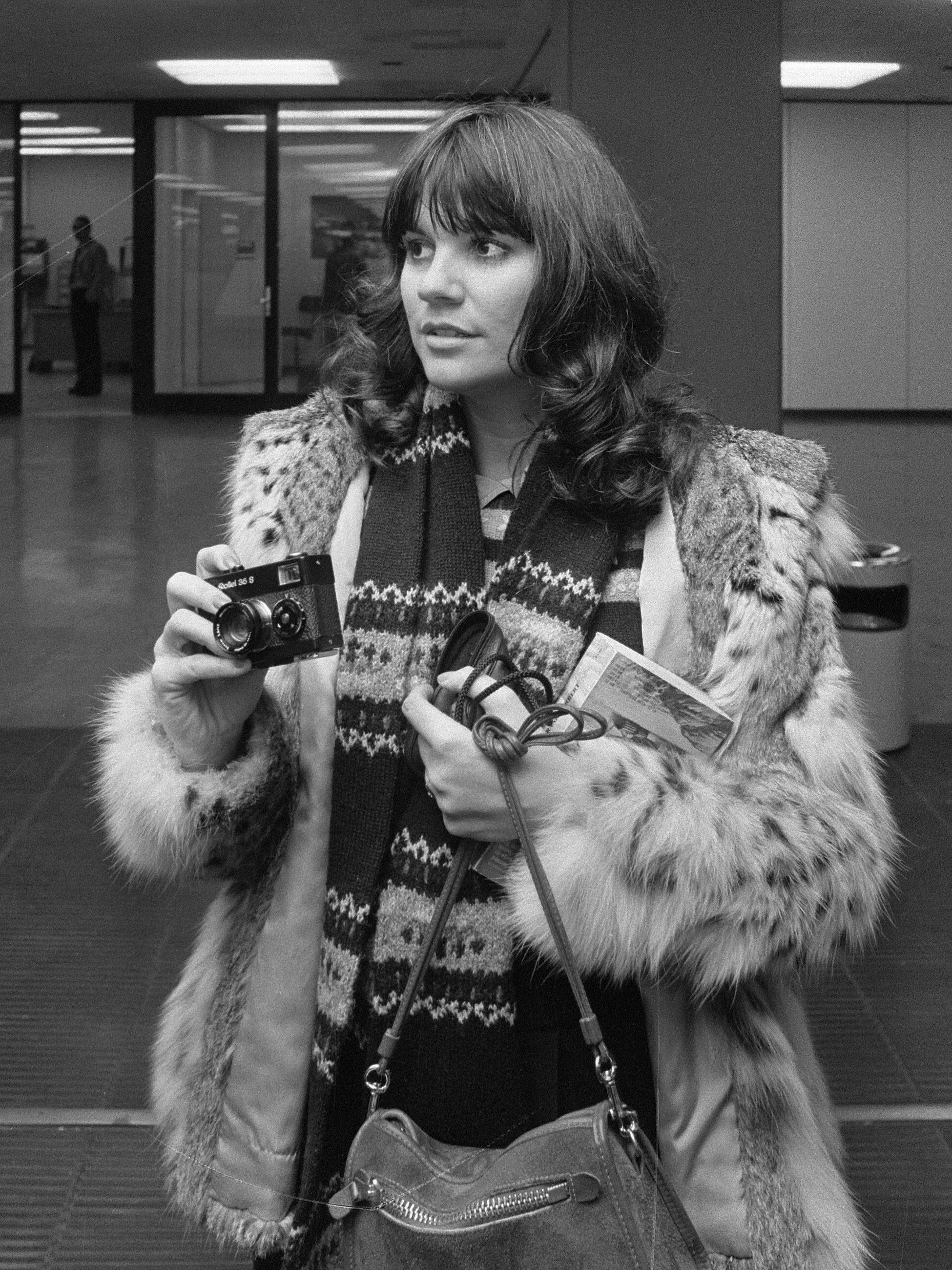
- Ronstadt in 1976

Background information
- Born: Linda Maria Ronstadt; July 15, 1946 (age 80); Tucson, Arizona, U.S.
- Genres: Rock; folk; pop; country; soul
- Occupations: Singer; musician; actress
- Instruments: Vocals; guitar
- Works: Albums; singles; performances
- Years active: 1965–2011
- Labels: Capitol; Asylum; Elektra; Verve; Rhino
- Website: Linda Ronstadt at the Wayback Machine (archived 2026-07-02)

Linda Maria Ronstadt (born July 15, 1946) is an American retired singer and musician who performed and recorded in diverse genres including rock, folk, pop, country, and soul.

Ronstadt has earned 11 Grammy Awards, three American Music Awards, two Academy of Country Music awards, an Emmy Award, and an ALMA Award. Many of her albums have been certified gold, platinum or multiplatinum in the United States and internationally. She has also earned nominations for a Tony Award and a Golden Globe award. She was awarded the Latin Grammy Lifetime Achievement Award by the Latin Recording Academy in 2011 and also awarded the Grammy Lifetime Achievement Award by the Recording Academy in 2016. She was inducted into the Rock and Roll Hall of Fame in April 2014. On July 28, 2014, she was awarded the National Medal of Arts and Humanities. (Note: Some of the content of the lead section is supported by these news items:) In 2019, she received a star jointly with Dolly Parton and Emmylou Harris on the Hollywood Walk of Fame for their work as the group Trio. Ronstadt was among five honorees who received the 2019 Kennedy Center Honors for lifetime artistic achievements.

Ronstadt has released 24 studio albums and 15 compilation or greatest hits albums. She charted 38 US Billboard Hot 100 singles. Twenty-one of those singles reached the top 40, ten reached the top 10, and one reached number one ("You're No Good"). Ronstadt also charted in the UK; two of her duets, "Somewhere Out There" with James Ingram and "Don't Know Much" with Aaron Neville, peaked at numbers 8 and 2 respectively, and the single "Blue Bayou" reached number 35 on the UK Singles Chart. She has charted 36 albums, ten top-10 albums, and three number one albums on the US Billboard albums chart. Ronstadt has lent her voice to over 120 albums, collaborating with artists in many genres, including Dolly Parton, Emmylou Harris, Bette Midler, Billy Eckstine, Frank Zappa, Carla Bley (Escalator Over the Hill), Rosemary Clooney, Flaco Jiménez, Philip Glass, Warren Zevon, Gram Parsons, Neil Young, Paul Simon, Earl Scruggs, Johnny Cash, and Nelson Riddle. Christopher Loudon, of Jazz Times, wrote in 2004 that Ronstadt is "blessed with arguably the most sterling set of pipes of her generation".

Ronstadt reduced her activity after 2000 when she felt her singing voice deteriorating. She released her final solo album in 2004 and her final collaborative album in 2006, and performed her final live concert in 2009. She announced her retirement in 2011 and revealed shortly afterward that she is no longer able to sing, as a result of a degenerative condition initially diagnosed as Parkinson's disease but later determined to be progressive supranuclear palsy. (Note: Ronstadt was initially diagnosed with Parkinson's disease, which she publicly revealed in 2013. However, it was reported in late 2019 that doctors have revised their diagnosis to progressive supranuclear palsy, which is commonly mistaken for Parkinson's due to the similarity of symptoms.) Since that time, Ronstadt has continued to make public appearances, going on a number of public speaking tours in the 2010s. She published an autobiography, Simple Dreams: A Musical Memoir, in September 2013. A documentary based on her memoirs, Linda Ronstadt: The Sound of My Voice, was released in 2019.

== Early life ==
Linda Maria Ronstadt was born in Tucson, Arizona on July 15, 1946, the third of four children of Gilbert Ronstadt (1911–1995), a prosperous machinery merchant who ran the F. Ronstadt Co., and Ruth Mary (née Copeman) Ronstadt (1914–1982), a homemaker.

Ronstadt had a Roman Catholic upbringing and was raised on the family's 10-acre (4 ha) ranch with her three siblings. The family was featured in Family Circle magazine in 1953. Her brother Peter Ronstadt would serve as Tucson's chief of police from 1981 to 1991.

=== Ronstadt family history ===
Ronstadt's father came from a pioneering Arizona ranching family and was of Mexican descent with a German male ancestor. The family's influence on and contributions to Arizona's history, including wagon making, commerce, pharmacies, and music, are documented in the library of the University of Arizona. Her great-grandfather, the engineer Friedrich August Ronstadt (who went by Federico Augusto Ronstadt), immigrated first to Sonora, Mexico, and later to the Southwest (at that time a part of Mexico) in the 1840s from Hanover, Germany. He married Margarita Redondo y Vásquez, a Mexican citizen, and eventually settled in Tucson. In 1991, the City of Tucson opened its central transit terminal on March 16 and dedicated it to Linda's grandfather, Federico José María Ronstadt, a local pioneer businessman; he was a wagon maker whose early contribution to the city's mobility included six mule-drawn streetcars, delivered in 1903–04.

Ronstadt's mother Ruth Mary, of German, English, and Dutch ancestry, was raised in Flint, Michigan. Ruth Mary's father, Lloyd Groff Copeman, a prolific inventor and holder of nearly 700 patents, invented an early form of the electric toaster, many refrigerator devices, the grease gun, the first electric stove, and an early form of the microwave oven. His flexible rubber ice cube tray earned him millions of dollars in royalties.

== Career summary ==
Everybody has their own level of doing their music. ... Mine just happened to resonate over the years, in one way and another, with a significant enough number of people so that I could do it professionally.

— Linda Ronstadt

Establishing her professional career in the mid-1960s at the forefront of California's emerging folk rock and country rock movements – genres which defined post-1960s rock music – Ronstadt joined forces with Bobby Kimmel and Kenny Edwards and became the lead singer of a folk-rock trio, the Stone Poneys. Later, as a solo artist, she released Hand Sown ... Home Grown in 1969, which has been described as the first alternative country record by a female recording artist. Although fame eluded her during these years, Ronstadt actively toured with The Doors, Neil Young, Jackson Browne, and others, appeared numerous times on television shows, and began to contribute her singing to albums by other artists.

With the release of chart-topping albums such as Heart Like a Wheel, Simple Dreams, and Living in the USA, Ronstadt became the first female "arena class" rock star. She set records as one of the top-grossing concert artists of the decade. Referred to as the "First Lady of Rock" and the "Queen of Rock", Ronstadt was voted the Top Female Pop Singer of the 1970s. Her rock-and-roll image was as famous as her music; she appeared six times on the cover of Rolling Stone, as well as on the covers of Newsweek and Time.

In the 1980s, Ronstadt performed on Broadway and received a Tony nomination for her performance in The Pirates of Penzance, teamed with the composer Philip Glass, recorded traditional music, and collaborated with the conductor Nelson Riddle, an event at that time viewed as an original and unorthodox move for a rock-and-roll artist. This venture paid off, and Ronstadt remained one of the music industry's best-selling acts throughout the 1980s, with multi-platinum-selling albums such as Mad Love; What's New; Canciones de Mi Padre; and Cry Like a Rainstorm, Howl Like the Wind. She continued to tour, collaborate, and record celebrated albums, such as Winter Light and Hummin' to Myself, until her retirement in 2011. Most of Ronstadt's albums are certified gold, platinum, or multi-platinum.

Having sold in excess of 100 million records worldwide and setting records as one of the top-grossing concert performers for over a decade, Ronstadt was the most successful female singer of the 1970s and stands as one of the most successful female recording artists in U.S. history. She opened many doors for women in rock and roll and other musical genres by championing songwriters and musicians, pioneering her chart success onto the concert circuit, and being in the vanguard of many musical movements.

== Career overview ==
=== Early influences ===
I don't record (any type of genre of music) that I didn't hear in my family's living room by the time I was 10. It just is my rule that I don't break because ... I can't do it authentically ... I really think that you're just hard-wiring (synapses) in your brain up until the age of maybe 12 or 10, and there are certain things you can't learn in an authentic way after that.

— Linda Ronstadt

Ronstadt's early family life was filled with music and tradition, which influenced the stylistic and musical choices she later made in her career. Growing up, she listened to many types of music, including Mexican music, which was sung by her entire family and was a staple in her childhood.

Ronstadt has remarked that all the styles she has recorded on her own records – rock and roll, rhythm and blues, gospel, opera, country, choral, and mariachi – are music she heard her family sing in their living room or heard played on the radio by the age of 10. She credits her mother for her appreciation of Gilbert and Sullivan and her father for introducing her to the traditional pop and Great American Songbook repertoire that she would, in turn, help reintroduce to an entire generation.

If I didn't hear it on the radio, or if my dad wasn't playing it on the piano, or if my brother wasn't playing it on the guitar or singing it in his boys' choir, or my mother and sister weren't practicing a Broadway tune or a Gilbert and Sullivan song, then I can't do it today. It's as simple as that. All of my influences and my authenticity are a direct result of the music played in that Tucson living room.

— Linda Ronstadt

Early on, her singing style had been influenced by singers such as Lola Beltrán and Édith Piaf; she has called their singing and rhythms "more like Greek music ... It's sort of like 6/8 time signature ... very hard driving and very intense." She also drew influence from country singer Hank Williams.

She has said that "all girl singers" eventually "have to curtsy to Ella Fitzgerald and Billie Holiday". Of Maria Callas, Ronstadt says, "There's no one in her league. That's it. Period. I learn more ... about singing rock n roll from listening to Maria Callas records than I ever would from listening to pop music for a month of Sundays. ... She's the greatest chick singer ever." She admires Callas for her musicianship and her attempts to push 20th-century singing, particularly opera, back into the bel canto "natural style of singing".

A self-described product of American radio of the 1950s and 1960s, Ronstadt is a fan of its eclectic and diverse music programming.

=== Beginning of professional career ===
At age 14, Ronstadt formed a folk trio with her brother Peter and sister Gretchen. The group played coffeehouses, fraternity houses, and other small venues, billing themselves as "the Union City Ramblers" and "the Three Ronstadts", and they even recorded themselves at a Tucson studio under the name "the New Union Ramblers". Their repertoire included the music they grew up on – folk, country, bluegrass, and Mexican. But increasingly, Ronstadt wanted to make a union of folk music and rock 'n' roll, and in 1964, after a semester at the University of Arizona, the 18-year-old decided to move to Los Angeles.

=== The Stone Poneys ===
Ronstadt visited a friend from Tucson, Bobby Kimmel, in Los Angeles during Easter break from college in 1964, and later that year, shortly before her eighteenth birthday, decided to move there permanently to form a band with him. Kimmel had already begun co-writing folk-rock songs with guitarist-songwriter Kenny Edwards, and eventually the three of them were signed by Nik Venet to Capitol in the summer of 1966 as "the Stone Poneys". The trio released three albums in a 15-month period in 1967–68: The Stone Poneys; Evergreen, Volume 2; and Linda Ronstadt, Stone Poneys and Friends, Vol. III. The band is widely known for their hit single "Different Drum" (written by Michael Nesmith prior to his joining the Monkees), which reached number 13 on the Billboard Hot 100 chart as well as number 12 in Cashbox magazine. Nearly 50 years later, the song remains one of Ronstadt's most popular recordings.

=== Solo career ===
Still contractually obligated to Capitol Records, Ronstadt released her first solo album, Hand Sown ... Home Grown, in 1969. It has been called the first alternative country record by a female recording artist. During this same period, she contributed to the Music from Free Creek "super session" project.

Ronstadt provided the vocals for some commercials during this period, including one for Remington electric razors, in which a multitracked Ronstadt and Frank Zappa claimed that the electric razor "cleans you, thrills you ... may even keep you from getting busted".

Ronstadt's second solo album, Silk Purse, was released in March 1970. Recorded entirely in Nashville, it was produced by Elliot Mazer, whom Ronstadt chose on the advice of Janis Joplin, who had worked with her on the Cheap Thrills album. The Silk Purse album cover showed Ronstadt in a muddy pigpen, while the back and inside cover depicted her onstage wearing bright red. Ronstadt has stated that she was not pleased with the album, although it provided her with her first solo hit, the multi-format single "Long Long Time", and earned her first Grammy nomination (for Best Contemporary Vocal Performance/Female).

==== Touring ====
Judy Henske, who was the then reigning queen of folk music, said to me at The Troubadour, "Honey, in this town there are four sexes. Men, women, homosexuals, and girl singers."

— Linda Ronstadt

Soon after she went solo in the late 1960s, one of her first backing bands was the pioneering country-rock band Swampwater, which combined Cajun and swamp rock elements in their music. Its members included Cajun fiddler Gib Guilbeau and John Beland, who later joined the Flying Burrito Brothers, as well as Stan Pratt, Thad Maxwell, and Eric White, brother of Clarence White of the Byrds. Swampwater went on to back Ronstadt during TV appearances on The Johnny Cash Show and The Mike Douglas Show, and at the Big Sur Folk Festival.

Another backing band included Don Henley, Glenn Frey, Bernie Leadon, and Randy Meisner, who went on to form the Eagles. They toured with her for a short period in 1971 and played on Linda Ronstadt, her eponymous third album, from which a failed single, Ronstadt's version of Jackson Browne's "Rock Me on the Water", was drawn. At this stage, Ronstadt began working with producer and boyfriend John Boylan. She said, "As soon as I started working with John Boylan, I started co-producing myself. I was always a part of my productions. But I always needed a producer who would carry out my whims." Also in 1971, Ronstadt began talking with David Geffen about moving from Capitol Records to Geffen's Asylum Records label.

In 1975, Ronstadt performed shows with Jackson Browne, the Eagles, and Toots and the Maytals. In these shows she would sing lead vocal on numerous songs including the Eagles' "Desperado" while singing background and playing tambourine and acoustic guitar on others.

Several years before Ronstadt became what author Gerri Hirshey called the first "arena-class rock diva" with "hugely anticipated tours" she began her solo career touring the North American concert circuit.

Being on the road took its toll both emotionally and professionally. In a 1976 Rolling Stone interview with Cameron Crowe, Ronstadt said, "they haven't invented a word for that loneliness that everybody goes through on the road. The world is tearing by you, real fast, and all these people are looking at you. ... People see me in my 'girl-singer' suit." In 1974 she told Peter Knobler in Crawdaddy, "People are always taking advantage of you; everybody that's interested in you has got an angle."

There were few "girl singers" on the rock circuit at the time, and they were relegated to "groupie level when in a crowd of a bunch of rock and roll guys", a status Ronstadt avoided. Relating to men on a professional level as fellow musicians led to competition, insecurity, bad romances, and a series of boyfriend-managers. At the time, she admired singers like Maria Muldaur for not sacrificing their femininity but says she felt enormous self-imposed pressure to compete with "the boys" at every level. She noted in a 1969 interview in Fusion magazine that it was difficult being a single "chick singer" with an all-male backup band. According to her, it was difficult to get a band of backing musicians because of their ego problem of being labeled sidemen for a female singer.

==== Collaborations with Peter Asher ====
In general when you fall in love with an artist and their music, the plan is a fairly simple one. .. get people to go and see them, and make a record that you think properly presents their music to the public and some of which you can get on the radio.

— Peter Asher, on collaborating with Ronstadt

Ronstadt began her fourth solo album, Don't Cry Now, in 1973, with Boylan (who had negotiated her contract with Asylum Records) and John David "JD" Souther producing most of the album's tracks. But needing someone willing to work with her as an equal, Ronstadt asked Peter Asher, who came highly recommended to her by James Taylor's sister Kate Taylor, to help produce two of them: "Sail Away" and "I Believe in You".

The album featured Ronstadt's first country hit, "Silver Threads and Golden Needles", which she had first recorded on Hand Sown ... Home Grown – this time hitting the Country Top 20.

With the release of Don't Cry Now, Ronstadt took on her biggest gig to date as the opening act on Neil Young's Time Fades Away tour, playing for larger crowds than ever before. Backstage at a concert in Texas, Chris Hillman introduced her to Emmylou Harris, telling them, "You two could be good friends," which soon occurred, resulting in frequent collaborations over the following years. Meanwhile, the album became Ronstadt's most successful up to that time, selling 300,000 copies by the end of 1974.

Asher turned out to be more collaborative, and more on the same page with her musically, than any producer she had worked with previously. Ronstadt's professional relationship with Asher allowed her to take command and effectively delegate responsibilities in the recording studio. Although hesitant at first to work with her because of her reputation for being a "woman of strong opinions (who) knew what she wanted to do (with her career)", he nonetheless agreed to become her full-time producer and remained in that role through the late 1980s. Asher attributed the long-term success of his working relationship with Ronstadt to the fact that he was the first person to manage and produce her with whom there was a solely professional relationship. "It must be a lot harder to have objective conversations about someone's career when it's someone you sleep with," he said.

Asher executive-produced a tribute CD called Listen to Me: Buddy Holly, released on September 6, 2011, on which Ronstadt's 1976 version of Buddy Holly's "That'll Be The Day" appears among newly recorded versions of Holly's songs by various artists.

==== Vocal styles ====
I grew up singing Mexican music, and that's based on indigenous Mexican rhythms. Mexican music also has an overlay of West African music, based on huapango drums, and it's kind of like a 6/8 time signature, but it really is a very syncopated 6/8. And that's how I attack vocals.

— Linda Ronstadt, on reconciling her musical instincts with rock 'n' roll.

Ronstadt captured the sounds of country music and the rhythms of ranchera music – which she likened in 1968 to "Mexican bluegrass" – and redirected them into her rock 'n' roll and some of her pop music. Many of these rhythms and sounds were part of her Southwestern roots. Likewise, a country sound and style, a fusion of country music and rock 'n' roll called country rock, started to exert its influence on mainstream pop music around the late 1960s, and it became an emerging movement Ronstadt helped form and commercialize. However, as early as 1970, Ronstadt was being criticized by music "purists" for her "brand of music" which crossed many genres. Country Western Stars magazine wrote in 1970 that "Rock people thought she was too gentle, folk people thought she was too pop, and pop people didn't quite understand where she was at, but Country people really loved Linda." She never categorized herself and stuck to her genre-crossing brand of music.

==== Interpretive singer ====
Ronstadt is considered an "interpreter of her times", and has earned praise for her courage to put her "stamp" on many of her songs. Ronstadt herself has indicated that some of her 1970s hits were recorded under considerable pressure to create commercially successful recordings, and that she prefers many of her songs that were non-hit album tracks. An infrequent songwriter, Ronstadt co-composed only three songs over her long career.

Ronstadt's natural vocal range spans several octaves from contralto to soprano, and occasionally she will showcase this entire range within a single work. Ronstadt was the first female artist in popular music history to accumulate four consecutive platinum albums (fourteen certified million selling, to date). As for the singles, Rolling Stone pointed out that a whole generation, "but for her, might never have heard the work of artists such as Buddy Holly, Elvis Costello, and Chuck Berry."

Music is meant to lighten your load. By singing it ... you release (the sadness). And release yourself ... an exercise in exorcism. ... You exorcise that emotion ... and diminish sadness and feel joy.

— Linda Ronstadt

Others have argued that Ronstadt had the same generational effect with her Great American Songbook music, exposing a whole new generation to the music of the 1920s and 1930s – music which was pushed aside because of the advent of rock 'n' roll. When interpreting, Ronstadt said she "sticks to what the music demands", in terms of lyrics. Explaining that rock and roll music is part of her culture, she says that the songs she sang after her rock and roll hits were part of her soul. "The (Mariachi music) was my father's side of the soul," she was quoted as saying in a 1998 interview she gave at her Tucson home. "My mother's side of my soul was the Nelson Riddle stuff. And I had to do them both to reestablish who I was."

In the 1974 book Rock 'N' Roll Woman, author Katherine Orloff writes that Ronstadt's "own musical preferences run strongly to rhythm and blues, the type of music she most frequently chooses to listen to ... (and) her goal is to ... be soulful too. With this in mind, Ronstadt fuses country and rock into a special union."

By this stage of her career, Ronstadt had established her niche in the field of country-rock. Along with other musicians such as the Flying Burrito Brothers, Emmylou Harris, Gram Parsons, Swampwater, Neil Young, and the Eagles, she helped free country music from stereotypes and showed rockers that country was okay. However, she stated that she was being pushed hard into singing more rock and roll.

==== Most successful female singer of the 1970s ====
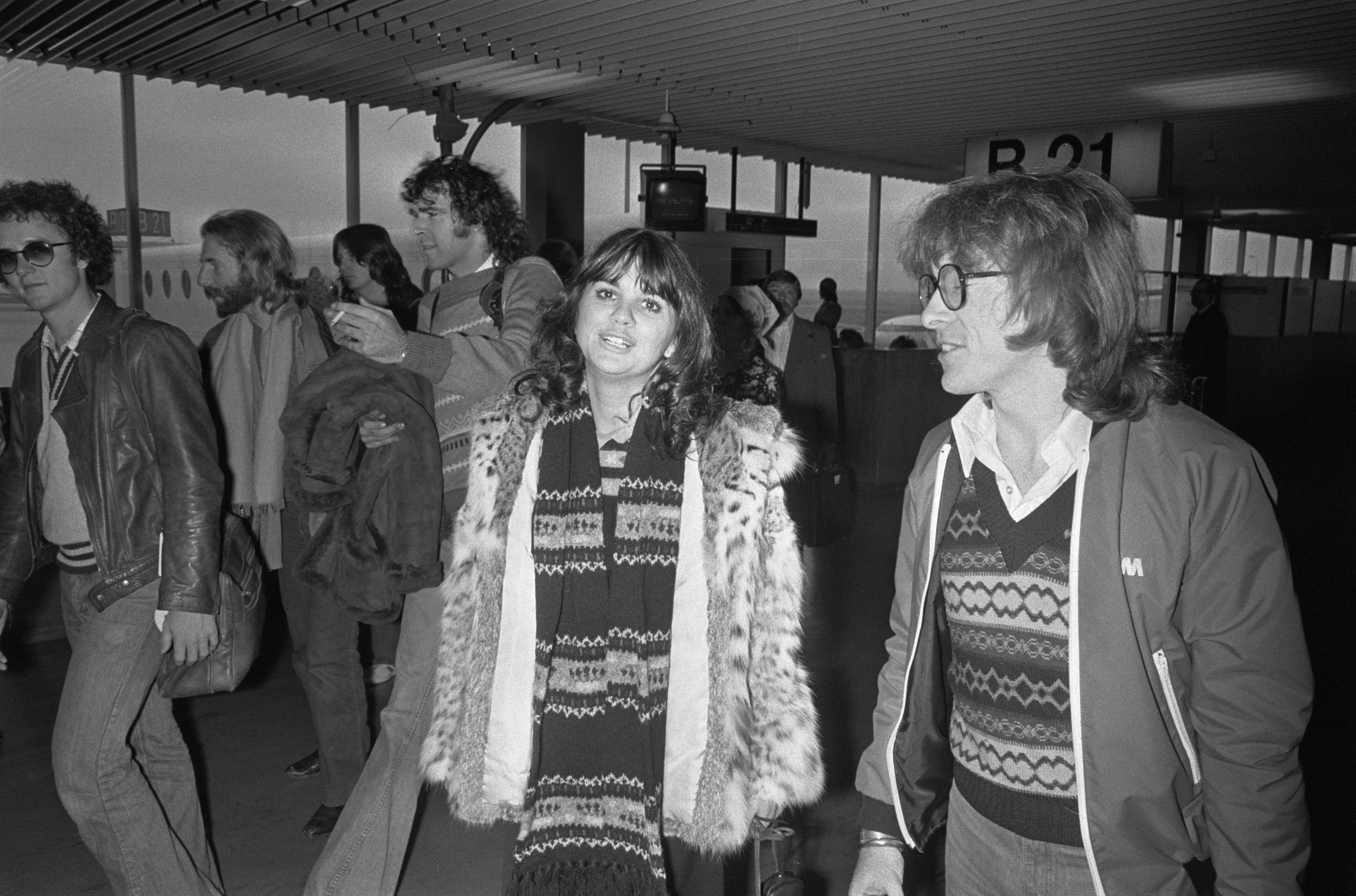
Ronstadt with producer Peter Asher and her band, 1976

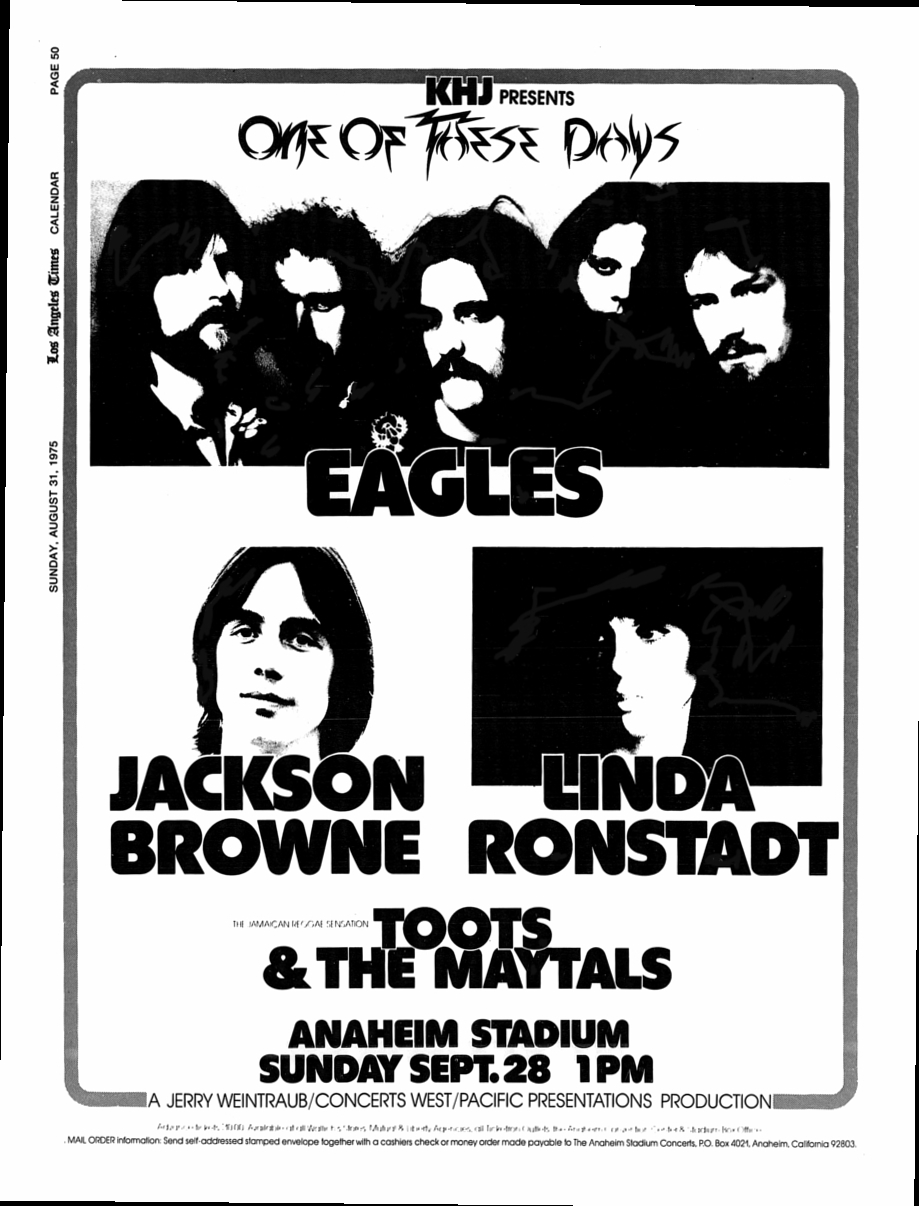
1975 concert poster from Anaheim, CA featuring Linda Ronstadt, The Eagles (band), Jackson Browne, and Toots and the Maytals with whom Ronstadt toured on several dates

Author Andrew Greeley, in his book God in Popular Culture, described Ronstadt as "the most successful and certainly the most durable and most gifted woman Rock singer of her era." Signaling her wide popularity as a concert artist, outside of the singles charts and the recording studio, Dirty Linen magazine describes her as the "first true woman rock 'n' roll superstar ... (selling) out stadiums with a string of mega-successful albums." Cashbox gave Ronstadt a Special Decade Award, as the top-selling female singer of the 1970s.

Her album covers, posters, magazine covers – her entire rock 'n' roll image – were as famous as her music. By the end of the decade, the singer whom the Chicago Sun Times described as the "Dean of the 1970s school of female rock singers" became what Redbook called "the most successful female rock star in the world." "Female" was the important qualifier, according to Time magazine, which labeled her "a rarity ... to (have survived) ... in the shark-infested deeps of rock."

Although Ronstadt had been a cult favorite on the music scene for several years, 1975 was "remembered in the music biz as the year when 29-year-old Linda Ronstadt belatedly happened."

With the release of Heart Like a Wheel‍—‌named after one of the album's songs, written by Anna McGarrigle‍—‌Ronstadt reached number 1 on the Billboard 200 chart; it was also the first of four number 1 Country Albums, and the disc was certified double-platinum (over two million copies sold in the U.S.). In many instances, her own interpretations were more successful than the original recordings, and many times new songwriters were discovered by a larger audience as a result of her interpretation and recording. Ronstadt had major success interpreting songs from a diverse spectrum of artists.

Heart Like a Wheel's first single release, "You're No Good" – a rockified version of an R&B song written by Clint Ballard, Jr. that Ronstadt had initially resisted because Andrew Gold's guitar tracks sounded too much like a "Beatles song" to her – climbed to number 1 on both the Billboard and Cash Box Pop singles charts. The album's second single release, "When Will I Be Loved" – an uptempo country-rock version of a Top 10 Everly Brothers song – hit number 1 in Cashbox and number 2 in Billboard. The song was also Ronstadt's first number 1 country hit.

The album's critical and commercial success was due to a fine presentation of country and rock, with Heart Like a Wheel her first of many major commercial successes that would set her on the path to being one of the best-selling female artists of all time. Ronstadt won her first Grammy Award for Best Country Vocal Performance/Female for "I Can't Help It (If I'm Still in Love with You)" which was originally a 1940s hit by Hank Williams. Ronstadt's interpretation peaked at number 2 on the country chart. The album itself was nominated for the Album of the Year Grammy.

Rolling Stone put Ronstadt on its cover in March 1975. It was the first of six Rolling Stone covers shot by photographer Annie Leibovitz. It included her as the featured artist with a full photo layout and an article by Ben Fong-Torres, discussing Ronstadt's many struggling years in rock n roll, as well as her home life and what it was like to be a woman on tour in a decidedly all-male environment.

In September 1975, Ronstadt's album Prisoner in Disguise was released. It quickly climbed into the Top Five on the Billboard Album Chart and sold over a million copies. It became her second in a row to go platinum, "a grand slam" in the same year (Ronstadt would eventually become the first female artist in popular music history to have three consecutive platinum albums and would ultimately go on to have eight consecutive platinum albums, and then another six between 1983 and 1990). The disc's first single release was "Love Is A Rose". It was climbing the pop and country charts but "Heat Wave", a rockified version of the 1963 hit by Martha and the Vandellas, was receiving considerable airplay. Asylum pulled the "Love Is a Rose" single and issued "Heat Wave" with "Love Is a Rose" on the B-side. "Heat Wave" hit the Top Five on Billboard's Hot 100 while "Love Is A Rose" hit the Top Five on Billboard's country chart.

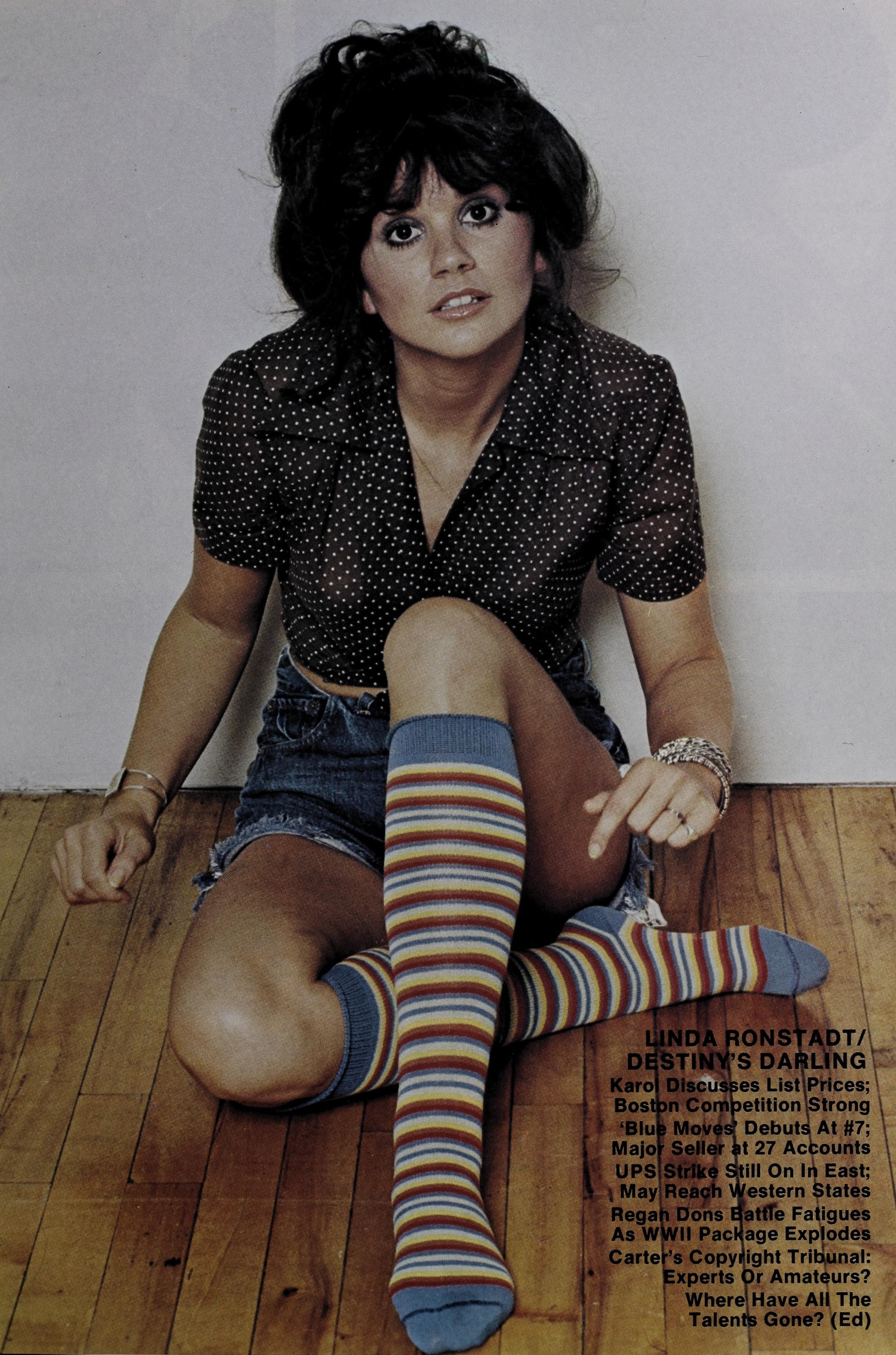
Ronstadt on the cover of Cash Box; November 13, 1976

In 1976, Ronstadt reached the Top 3 of Billboard's Album Chart and won her second career Grammy Award for Best Female Pop Vocal Performance for her third consecutive platinum album Hasten Down the Wind. The album featured a sexy, revealing cover shot and showcased Ronstadt the singer-songwriter, who composed two of its songs, "Try Me Again" (co-authored with Andrew Gold) and "Lo Siento Mi Vida". It also included an interpretation of Willie Nelson's ballad "Crazy", which became a Top 10 Country hit for Ronstadt in early 1977.

At the end of 1977, Ronstadt surpassed the success of Heart Like a Wheel with her album Simple Dreams, which, after spending nine consecutive weeks at number 2 behind Fleetwood Mac's Rumours, displaced it, and held the number 1 position for five consecutive weeks on the Billboard 200 chart. It sold over 3 1/2 million copies in less than a year in the U.S. alone – a record for a female artist. Simple Dreams spawned a string of hit singles on numerous charts. Among them were the RIAA platinum-certified single "Blue Bayou", a country-rock interpretation of a Roy Orbison song; "It's So Easy" – previously sung by Buddy Holly – , a cover of The Rolling Stones' "Tumbling Dice", and "Poor Poor Pitiful Me", a song written by Warren Zevon, an up-and-coming songwriter of the time. The album garnered several Grammy Award nominations – including Record of the Year and Best Pop Vocal Performance/Female for "Blue Bayou" – and won its art director, Kosh, a Grammy Award for Best Album Cover, the first of three Grammy Awards he would win for designing Ronstadt album covers. In late 1977, Ronstadt became the first female recording artist to have two songs in the U.S. Billboard Hot 100 Top Ten at the same time. "Blue Bayou" was at No. 3 while "It's So Easy" was at No. 5.

Simple Dreams became one of the singer's most successful albums internationally, reaching number 1 on the Australian and Canadian Pop and Country Albums charts. Simple Dreams also made Ronstadt the most successful international female touring artist. The same year, she completed a concert tour around Europe. As Country Music magazine wrote in October 1978, Simple Dreams solidified Ronstadt's role as "easily the most successful female rock and roll and country star at this time."

Also in 1977, she was asked by the Los Angeles Dodgers to sing the U.S. National Anthem at game three of the World Series against the New York Yankees.

==== Time and "rock chick" image ====
Ronstadt said she was "artificially encouraged to kinda cop a really tough attitude (and be tough) because rock and roll is kind of tough (business)". Female rock artists like her and Janis Joplin, whom she described as lovely, shy, and literate in real life and the antithesis of the "red hot mamma" she was artificially encouraged to project, went through an identity crisis.

Ronstadt on the cover of the February 28, 1977, issue of Time

By the mid-1970s, Ronstadt's image became just as famous as her music. In 1976 and 1977, she appeared on the covers of Rolling Stone and Time. The Rolling Stone cover story was accompanied by a series of photographs of Ronstadt in a skimpy red slip, taken by Annie Leibovitz. Ronstadt felt deceived, not realizing that the photos would be so revealing. She says her manager Peter Asher kicked Leibovitz out of the house when she visited to show them the photographs prior to publication. Leibovitz had refused to let them veto any of the photos, which included one of Ronstadt sprawled across a bed in her underpants. In a 1977 interview, Ronstadt explained, "Annie [Leibovitz] saw that picture as an exposé of my personality. She was right. But I wouldn't choose to show a picture like that to anybody who didn't know me personally, because only friends could get the other sides of me in balance."

Her 1977 appearance on the cover Time under the banner "Torchy Rock" was also upsetting to Ronstadt, considering what the image appeared to project about the most famous woman in rock. At a time in the industry when men still told women what to sing and what to wear, Ronstadt hated the image of her that was projected to the world on that cover, and she noted how the photographer kept forcing her to wear a dress, which was an image she did not want to project. In 2004, she was interviewed for CBS This Morning and stated that this image was not her because she did not sit like that. Asher noted, "Anyone who's met Linda for 10 seconds will know that I couldn't possibly have been her Svengali. She's an extremely determined woman, in every area. To me, she was everything that feminism's about." Qualities which, Asher has stated, were considered a "negative (in a woman at that time), whereas in a man they were perceived as being masterful and bold". Since her solo career had begun, Ronstadt had fought hard to be recognized as a solo female singer in the world of rock, and her portrayal on the Time cover did not appear to help the situation.

In 1978, Rolling Stone declared Ronstadt "by far America's best-known female rock singer." She scored a third number 1 album on the Billboard Album Chart – at this point equaling the record set by Carole King in 1974 – with Living in the USA. She achieved a major hit single with "Ooo Baby Baby", with her rendition hitting all four major singles charts (Pop, AC, Country, R&B). Living in the USA was the first album by any recording act in music history to ship double-platinum (over 2 million advance copies). The album eventually sold 3 million U.S. copies.

At the end of that year, Billboard magazine crowned Ronstadt with three number-one Awards for the Year: Pop Female Singles Artist of the Year, Pop Female Album Artist of the Year, and Female Artist of the Year (overall).

Living in the USA showed the singer on roller skates with a newly short, permed hairdo on the album cover. Ronstadt continued this theme on concert tour promotional posters with photos of her on roller skates in a dramatic pose with a large American flag in the background. By this stage of her career, she was using posters to promote every album and concert – which at the time were recorded live on radio or television.

Ronstadt was also featured in the 1978 film FM, where the plot involved disc jockeys attempting to broadcast a Ronstadt concert live, without a competing station's knowledge. The film also showed Ronstadt performing the songs "Poor, Poor Pitiful Me", "Love Me Tender", and "Tumbling Dice". Ronstadt was persuaded to record "Tumbling Dice" after Mick Jagger came backstage when she was at a concert and said, "You do too many ballads, you should do more rock and roll songs."

Following the success of Living in the USA, Ronstadt conducted album promotional tours and concerts. She made a guest appearance onstage with the Rolling Stones at the Tucson Community Center on July 21, 1978, in her hometown of Tucson, where she and Jagger sang "Tumbling Dice". On singing with Jagger, Ronstadt later said, "I loved it. I didn't have a trace of stage fright. I'm scared to death all the way through my own shows. But it was too much fun to get scared. He's so silly onstage, he knocks you over. I mean you have to be on your toes or you wind up falling on your face."

==== Highest-paid woman in rock ====
Rock is the thumping heart of Linda's music, and the rock world is dominated by males. The biggest stars are male, and so are the back-up musicians ... rock beats are ... phallic, and lyrics ... masculine. ... Janis Joplin, the first great white woman rocker, rattled the bars ... but she died. ... Joni Mitchell ... stylish (but can't) compete in drawing power with men ... (however) Linda Ronstadt ... has made herself one of the biggest individual rock draws in the world.

— Time magazine, in 1977

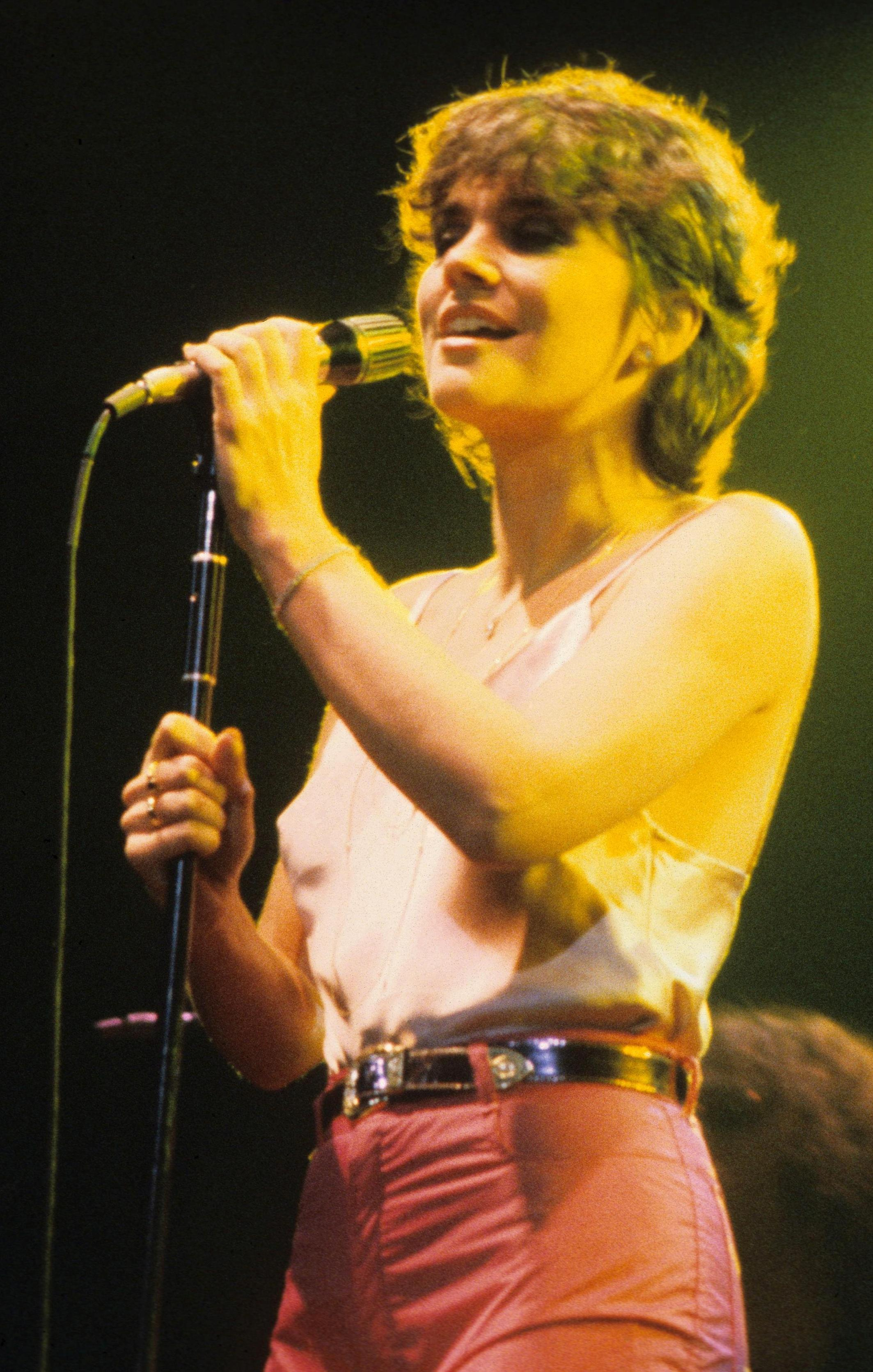
Ronstadt at the New Haven Veterans Memorial Coliseum, August 16, 1978

By the end of 1978, Ronstadt had solidified her role as one of rock and pop's most successful solo female acts, and owing to her consistent platinum album success, and her ability as the first woman to sell out concerts in arenas and stadiums hosting tens of thousands of fans, Ronstadt became the "highest-paid woman in rock". She had six platinum-certified albums, three of which were number 1 on the Billboard album chart, and numerous charting pop singles. In 1978 alone, she made over $12 million (equivalent to $59 million in 2025) and in the same year her albums sales were reported to be 17 million – grossing over $60 million (equivalent to $300 million in 2025).

As Rolling Stone dubbed her "Rock's Venus", her record sales continued to multiply and set records themselves. By 1979, Ronstadt had collected eight gold, six platinum, and four multi-platinum certifications for her albums, an unprecedented feat at the time. Her 1976 Greatest Hits album would sell consistently for the next 25 years, and it was certified by the RIAA for seven-times platinum in 2001 (over seven million U.S. copies sold). In 1980, Greatest Hits, Volume 2 was released and certified platinum.

In 1979, Ronstadt went on an international tour, playing in arenas across Australia to Japan, including the Melbourne Cricket Ground in Melbourne, and the Budokan in Tokyo. She also participated in a benefit concert for her friend Lowell George, held at the Forum, in Los Angeles.

By the end of the decade, Ronstadt had outsold her female competition; she had five straight platinum LPs – Hasten Down the Wind and Heart Like a Wheel among them. Us Weekly reported in 1978 that Ronstadt, Joni Mitchell, Stevie Nicks, and Carly Simon had become "The Queens of Rock" and "Rock is no longer exclusively male. There is a new royalty ruling today's record charts."

She would go on to parlay her mass commercial appeal with major success in interpreting The Great American Songbook – made famous a generation before by Frank Sinatra and Ella Fitzgerald – and later the Mexican folk songs of her childhood.

==== From rock to operetta ====
Rampant eclecticism is my middle name.

— Linda Ronstadt

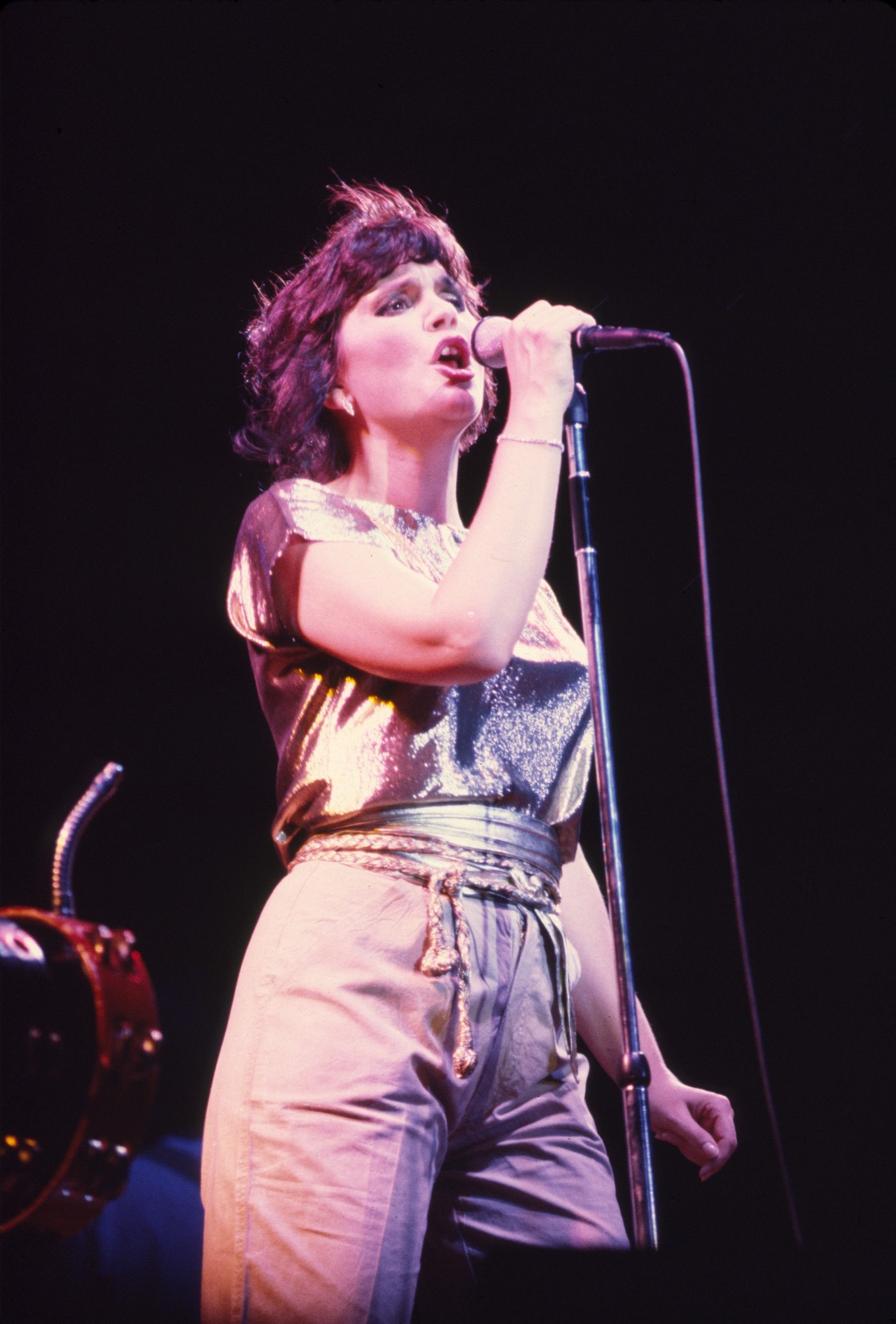
Ronstadt at Six Flags Over Texas, August 1981

In February 1980, Ronstadt released Mad Love, her seventh consecutive platinum-selling album. It was a straightforward rock and roll album with post-punk, new wave influences, including tracks by songwriters such as Elvis Costello, the Cretones, and musician Mark Goldenberg who played on the record himself. As part of the album's promotion, a live concert was recorded for an HBO special in April. A partial soundtrack for this special (omitting most of the Mad Love tracks) was released as her first official live album in February 2019.

She also made the cover of Rolling Stone for a record-setting sixth time. Mad Love entered the Billboard Album Chart in the Top Five its first week (a record at that time) and climbed to the number 3 position. The project continued her streak of Top 10 hits with "How Do I Make You", originally recorded by Billy Thermal, and "Hurt So Bad", originally a Top 10 hit for Little Anthony & the Imperials. The album earned Ronstadt a 1980 Grammy Award nomination for Best Rock Vocal Performance/Female (although she lost to Pat Benatar's Crimes of Passion album). Benatar praised Ronstadt by stating, "There are a lot of good female singers around. How could I be the best? Ronstadt is still alive!"

In the summer 1980, Ronstadt began rehearsals for the first of several leads in Broadway musicals. Joseph Papp cast her as the lead in the New York Shakespeare Festival production of Gilbert and Sullivan's The Pirates of Penzance, alongside Kevin Kline. She said singing Gilbert and Sullivan was a natural choice for her, since her grandfather Fred Ronstadt was credited with having created Tucson's first orchestra, the Club Filarmonico Tucsonense, and had once created an arrangement of The Pirates of Penzance.

The Pirates of Penzance opened for a limited engagement in New York City's Central Park, eventually moving its production to Broadway, where it became a hit, running from January 8, 1981, to November 28, 1982. Newsweek was effusive in its praise: "... she has not dodged the coloratura demands of her role (and Mabel is one of the most demanding parts in the G&S canon): from her entrance trilling 'Poor Wand'ring One,' it is clear that she is prepared to scale whatever soprano peaks stand in her way." Ronstadt co-starred with Kline and Angela Lansbury in the 1983 operetta's film version; this was her only acting role in a motion picture (her other film appearances, such as in the 1978 drama, FM, being concert footage as herself). Ronstadt received a Golden Globe nomination for the role in the film version. She garnered a nomination for the Tony Award for Best Performance by a Leading Actress in a Musical and The Pirates of Penzance won several Tony Awards, including a Tony Award for Best Revival.

As a child, Ronstadt had discovered the opera La bohème through the silent film with Lillian Gish and was determined to someday play the part of Mimi. When she met the opera superstar Beverly Sills, she was told, "My dear, every soprano in the world wants to play Mimi!" In 1984, Ronstadt was cast in the role at Joseph Papp's Public Theater. However, the production was a critical and commercial disaster, closing after only a few nights.

In 1982, Ronstadt released the album Get Closer, a primarily rock album with some country and pop music as well. It remains her only album between 1975 and 1990 not to be officially certified platinum. It peaked at number 31 on the Billboard Album Chart. The release continued her streak of Top 40 hits with "Get Closer" and "I Knew You When" – a 1965 hit by Billy Joe Royal – while the Jimmy Webb song "Easy For You To Say" was a surprise Top 10 Adult Contemporary hit in the spring of 1983. "Sometimes You Just Can't Win" was picked up by country radio, and made it to number 27 on that listing. Ronstadt also filmed several music videos for this album which became popular on the fledgling MTV cable channel. The album earned Ronstadt two Grammy Award nominations: one for Best Rock Vocal Performance/Female for the title track and another for Best Pop Vocal Performance/Female for the album. The artwork won its art director, Kosh, his second Grammy Award for Best Album Package.

Along with the release of her Get Closer album, Ronstadt embarked on a North American tour, remaining one of the top rock-concert draws that summer and fall. On November 25, 1982, her "Happy Thanksgiving Day" concert was held at the Reunion Arena in Dallas and broadcast live via satellite to NBC radio stations in the United States.

In 1988, Ronstadt returned to Broadway for a limited-run engagement in the musical show adaptation of her album celebrating her Mexican heritage, Canciones De Mi Padre – A Romantic Evening in Old Mexico.

=== Artistic aspirations ===
Ronstadt has remarked that in the beginning of her career she "was so focused on folk, rock and country" that she "got a bit bored and started to branch out, and ... [has] been doing that ever since." By 1983, her estimated worth was over $40 million mostly from records, concerts and merchandising.

In the early 1980s, Ronstadt was criticized for accepting $500,000 to perform at the South African resort Sun City, violating the cultural boycott imposed against South Africa because of its policy of apartheid. At the time, she stated, "the last place for a boycott is in the arts" and "I don't like being told I can't go somewhere". Paul Simon was criticized for including her on his 1986 album Graceland, recorded in South Africa, but defended her: "I know that her intention was never to support the government there ... She made a mistake. She's extremely liberal in her political thinking and unquestionably antiapartheid."

Ronstadt eventually tired of playing arenas. She had ceased to feel that arenas, where people milled around smoking marijuana cigarettes and drinking beer, were "appropriate places for music". She wanted "angels in the architecture" – a reference to a lyric in the Paul Simon song "You Can Call Me Al" from Graceland. (Ronstadt sang harmony with Simon on a different Graceland track, "Under African Skies". The second verse's lyrics pay tribute to Ronstadt: "Take this child, Lord, from Tucson, Arizona. ..."). Ronstadt has said she wants to sing in places similar to the theatre of ancient Greece, where the attention is focused on the stage and the performer.

Ronstadt's recording output in the 1980s proved to be just as commercially and critically successful as her 1970s recordings. Between 1983 and 1990, Ronstadt scored six additional platinum albums; two are triple platinum (each with over three million U.S. copies sold); one has been certified double platinum (over two million copies sold), and one has earned additional certification as a Gold (over 500,000 U.S. copies sold) double-disc album.

=== Jazz/pop trilogy ===
In 1981, Ronstadt produced and recorded an album of pop standards (later marketed in bootleg form) titled Keeping Out of Mischief with the assistance of producer Jerry Wexler. However, Ronstadt's displeasure with the result led her, with regrets, to scrap the project. "Doing that killed me," she said in a Time magazine interview. But the appeal of the album's music had seduced Ronstadt, as she told DownBeat in April 1985, crediting Wexler for encouraging her. Nonetheless, Ronstadt had to convince her reluctant record company, Elektra, to approve this type of album under her contract.

By 1983, Ronstadt had enlisted the help of 62-year-old conductor Nelson Riddle. The two embarked on an unorthodox and original approach to rehabilitating the Great American Songbook, recording a trilogy of traditional pop albums: What's New (1983‍—‌U.S. 3.7 million as of 2010); Lush Life (1984‍—‌U.S. 1.7 million as of 2010); and For Sentimental Reasons (1986‍—‌U.S. 1.3 million as of 2010). The three albums have had a combined sales total of nearly seven million copies in the U.S. alone.

I now realize I was taking a tremendous risk, and that Joe Smith (the head of Elektra Records, and strongly opposed) was looking out for himself, and for me. When it became apparent I wouldn't change my mind, he said: "I love Nelson so much! Can I please come to the sessions." I said "Yes." When the albums ... were successful, Joe congratulated me, and I never said "I told you so."

— Linda Ronstadt

The album design for What's New by designer Kosh was unlike any of her previous disc covers. It showed Ronstadt in a vintage dress lying on shimmering satin sheets with a Walkman headset. At the time, Ronstadt received some chiding for both the album cover and her venture into what was then considered "elevator music" by cynics, but remained determined to record with Riddle, and What's New became a hit. The album was released in September 1983 and spent 81 weeks on the Billboard Album Chart and held the number three position for a month and a half (held out of the top spot only by Michael Jackson's Thriller and Lionel Richie's Can't Slow Down) and the RIAA certified it triple platinum (over three million copies sold in the U.S. alone). The album earned Ronstadt another Grammy nomination for Best Female Pop Vocal Performance, and critical raves, with Time magazine calling it "one of the gutsiest, most unorthodox and unexpected albums of the year."

Ronstadt faced considerable pressure not to record What's New or record with Riddle. According to jazz historian Peter Levinson, author of the book September in the Rain – a Biography on Nelson Riddle, Joe Smith, president of Elektra Records, was terrified that the Riddle album would turn off Ronstadt's rock audience. Ronstadt did not completely turn her back on her rock and roll past, however; the video for the title track featured Danny Kortchmar as the old beau that she bumped into during a rainstorm.

What's New brought Riddle to a younger audience. According to Levinson, "the younger audience hated what Riddle had done with Frank Sinatra, which in 1983 was considered 'Vintage Pop'". Working with Ronstadt, Riddle brought his career back into focus in the last three years of his life. Stephen Holden of The New York Times wrote, What's New "isn't the first album by a rock singer to pay tribute to the golden age of the pop, but is ... the best and most serious attempt to rehabilitate an idea of pop that Beatlemania and the mass marketing of rock LPs for teenagers undid in the mid-60s. ... In the decade prior to Beatlemania, most of the great band singers and crooners of the 40s and 50s codified a half-century of American pop standards on dozens of albums ... many of them now long out-of-print." What's New is the first album by a rock singer to have major commercial success in rehabilitating the Great American Songbook.

In 1984, Ronstadt and Riddle performed these songs live, in concert halls throughout Australia, Japan, and the United States, including multi-night performances at historic venues Carnegie Hall, Radio City Music Hall, and Pine Knob.

In 2004, Ronstadt released Hummin' to Myself, her album for Verve Records. It was her first foray into traditional jazz since her sessions with Jerry Wexler and her records with the Nelson Riddle Orchestra, but this time with an intimate jazz combo. The album was a quiet affair for Ronstadt, giving few interviews and making only one television performance as a promotion. It reached number 2 on Billboard's Top Jazz Albums chart but peaked at number 166 on the main Billboard album chart. Not having the mass distribution that Warner Music Group gave her, Hummin' To Myself had sold over 75,000 copies in the U.S. as of 2010. It also achieved some critical acclaim from the jazz cognoscenti.

=== "Trio" recordings ===
When (we) sang, it was a beautiful and different sound I've never heard before. We (recorded the vocals) as individual parts, because we didn't have the luxury of spending a lot of time together on a tour bus ... and knowing each other's (vocal) moves ... takes years.

— Linda Ronstadt

In 1978, Ronstadt, Dolly Parton, and Emmylou Harris, friends and admirers of one another's work (Ronstadt had included a cover of Parton's "I Will Always Love You" on Prisoner in Disguise) attempted to collaborate on a Trio album. Unfortunately, the attempt did not pan out. Ronstadt later remarked that not too many people were in control at the time and everyone was too involved with their own careers. (Though the efforts to complete the album were abandoned, a number of the recordings were included on the singers' respective solo recordings over the next few years.) This concept album was put on the back burner for almost ten years.

In January 1986, the three eventually did make their way into the recording studio, where they spent the next several months working. The result, Trio, which they had conceived ten years earlier, was released in March 1987. It was a considerable hit, holding the number 1 position on Billboard's Country Albums chart for five weeks running and hitting the Top 10 on the pop side also. Selling over three million copies in the U.S. and winning them a Grammy Award for Best Country Performance by a Duo or Group with Vocal, it produced four Top Ten Country singles including "To Know Him Is to Love Him" which hit number 1. The album was also a nominee for overall Album of the Year, in the company of Michael Jackson, U2, Prince, and Whitney Houston.

In 1994, the three performers recorded a follow-up to Trio. As was the case with their aborted 1978 effort, conflicting schedules and competing priorities delayed the album's release indefinitely. Ronstadt, who had already paid for studio time‍—‌and owed her record company a finished album‍—‌removed Parton's individual tracks at Parton's request, kept Harris's vocals, and produced a number of the recordings, which she subsequently released on her 1995 return to country rock, the album Feels Like Home.

However, in 1999, Ronstadt, Parton, and Harris agreed to release the Trio II album, as was originally recorded in 1994. It included an ethereal cover of Neil Young's "After The Gold Rush" which became a popular music video. The effort was certified Gold (over 500,000 copies sold) and won them a Grammy Award for Best Country Collaboration with Vocals for the track. Ronstadt co-produced the album with George Massenburg and the three women also received a nomination for the Grammy Award for Best Country Album.

=== Canciones de Mi Padre ===
At the end of 1987, Ronstadt released Canciones de Mi Padre, an album of traditional Mexican folk songs, or what she has described as "world class songs". Keeping with the Ronstadt history theme, her cover art was dramatic, bold, and colorful; it shows Ronstadt in full Mexican regalia. Her musical arranger was mariachi musician Rubén Fuentes.

These canciones were a big part of Ronstadt's family tradition and musical roots. In January 1946, the University of Arizona published a booklet by Luisa Espinel entitled Canciones de mi Padre. Luisa Espinel, Ronstadt's aunt, was an international singer in the 1920s and 1930s. Espinel's father was Fred Ronstadt, Linda Ronstadt's grandfather, and the songs she had learned, transcribed, and published were some of the ones he had brought with him from Sonora. Ronstadt researched and extracted from the favorites she had learned from her father Gilbert and she called her album by the same name as her aunt's booklet and as a tribute to her father and his family. Though not fully bilingual, she has a fairly good command of the Spanish language, allowing her to sing Latin American songs with little discernible U.S. accent; Ronstadt has often identified herself as Mexican-American. Her formative years were spent with her father's side of the family. In fact, in 1976, Ronstadt had collaborated with her father to write and compose a traditional Mexican folk ballad, "Lo siento mi vida" – a song that she included on Hasten Down the Wind. Ronstadt has also credited Mexican singer Lola Beltrán as an influence on her own singing style, and she recalls how a frequent guest to the Ronstadt home, Eduardo "Lalo" Guerrero, father of Chicano music, would often serenade her as a child.

Canciones de Mi Padre won Ronstadt a Grammy Award for Best Mexican-American Performance. In 2001, it was certified double-platinum by the RIAA for shipments of over 2 million copies in the United States, making it the best-selling non-English-language album in U.S. music history. The album and later theatrical stage show served as a benchmark of the Latin cultural renaissance in North America.

(I obtained) enough clout and ... after years and years of making commercial records, I was entitled to experiment ... the success of the (Nelson Riddle albums) ... entitled me to try the Mexican stuff.

— Linda Ronstadt

Ronstadt produced and performed a theatrical stage show, also titled Canciones de mi Padre, in concert halls across the U.S. and Latin America to both Hispanic and non-Hispanic audiences. These performances were later released on DVD. Ronstadt elected to return to the Broadway stage, four years after she performed in La bohème, for a limited-run engagement. PBS's Great Performances aired the stage show during its annual fund drives and the show was a hit with audiences, earning Ronstadt a Primetime Emmy Award for Individual Performance in a Variety or Music Program.

Ronstadt recorded two additional albums of Latin music in the early 1990s. Their promotion, like most of her albums in the 1990s, was a quieter affair, with Ronstadt making only a limited number of appearances to promote them. They were not nearly as successful as Canciones De Mi Padre, but were critically acclaimed in some circles. In 1991, she released Mas Canciones, a follow-up to the first Canciones. For this album, she won a Grammy Award for Best Mexican/Mexican-American Album. The following year, she stepped outside of the mariachi genre and decided to record well-known Afro-Cuban songs. This album was titled Frenesí. Like her two previous Latin recordings ventures, it won Ronstadt a Grammy Award, this time for Best Traditional Tropical Latin Album.

In 1991, Ronstadt acted in the lead role of archangel San Miguel in La Pastorela, or A Shephard's Tale, a musical filmed at San Juan Bautista. It was written and directed by Luis Valdez. The production was part of the PBS Great Performances series.

In December 2020, it was announced that Canciones de Mi Padre had been inducted into the Grammy Hall of Fame.

=== Returning to the contemporary music scene ===
By the late 1980s, while enjoying the success of her big band jazz collaborations with Riddle and her surprise hit mariachi recordings, Ronstadt elected to return to recording mainstream pop music once again. In 1987, she made a return to the top of the Billboard Hot 100 singles chart with "Somewhere Out There", which peaked at number 2 in March. Featured in the animated film An American Tail, the sentimental duet with James Ingram was nominated for several Grammy Awards, ultimately winning the Grammy Award for Song of the Year. The song also received a nomination for the Academy Award for Best Original Song and achieved high sales, earning a million-selling gold single in the U.S. – one of the last 45s ever to do so. It was also accompanied by a popular music video. On the heels of this success, Steven Spielberg asked Ronstadt to record the theme song for the animated sequel titled An American Tail: Fievel Goes West, which was titled "Dreams to Dream". Although "Dreams to Dream" failed to achieve the success of "Somewhere Out There", the song did give Ronstadt an Adult Contemporary hit in 1991.

In 1989, Ronstadt released a mainstream pop album and several popular singles. Cry Like A Rainstorm, Howl Like The Wind became one of the singer's most successful albums – in production, arrangements, sales, and critical acclaim. It became Ronstadt's tenth Top 10 album on the Billboard chart, reaching number 7 and being certified triple-platinum (over three million copies sold in the U.S.). The album also received Grammy Award nominations. Ronstadt included New Orleans soul singer Aaron Neville on several of the album's songs.

Ronstadt incorporated the sounds of the Oakland Interfaith Gospel Choir, Tower of Power horns, the Skywalker Symphony, and numerous musicians. It included the duets with Aaron Neville, "Don't Know Much" (Billboard Hot 100 number 2 hit, Christmas 1989) and "All My Life" (Billboard Hot 100 number 11 hit), both of which were long-running number 1 Adult Contemporary hits. The duets earned several Grammy Award nominations. The duo won both the 1989 and 1990 Best Pop Vocal Performance by a Duo or Group with Vocal awards. Ronstadt's last known live Grammy Award appearance was in 1990 when she and Neville performed "Don't Know Much" together on the telecast. ("Whenever I sing with a different artist, I can get things out of my voice that I can't do by myself", Ronstadt reflected in 2007. "I can do things with Aaron that I can't do alone.")

In December 1990, she participated in a concert held at the Tokyo Dome to commemorate John Lennon's 50th birthday, and to raise awareness of environmental issues. Other participants included Miles Davis, Lenny Kravitz, Hall & Oates, Natalie Cole, Yoko Ono, and Sean Lennon. An album resulted, titled Happy Birthday, John.

=== Return to roots music ===
Ronstadt released the highly acclaimed Winter Light album at the end of 1993. It included New Age arrangements such as the lead single "Heartbeats Accelerating" as well as the self-penned title track and featured the glass harmonica. It was her first commercial failure since 1972, and peaked at number 92 in Billboard, whereas 1995's Feels Like Home was Ronstadt's much-heralded return to country-rock and included her version of Tom Petty's classic hit "The Waiting". The single's rollicking, fiddle-infused flip side, "Walk On", returned Ronstadt to the Country Singles chart for the first time since 1983. An album track entitled "The Blue Train" charted 10 weeks in Billboard's Adult Contemporary Top 40. This album fared slightly better than its predecessor, reaching number 75. Both albums were later deleted from the Elektra/Asylum catalog. Ronstadt was nominated for three Lo Nuestro Awards in 1993: Female Regional Mexican Artist of the Year, Female Tropical/Salsa Artist of the Year, and her version of the song "Perfidia" was also listed for Tropical/Salsa Song of the Year.

In 1996, Ronstadt produced Dedicated to the One I Love, an album of classic rock and roll songs reinvented as lullabies. The album reached number 78 in Billboard and won the Grammy Award for Best Musical Album for Children.

In 1998, Ronstadt released We Ran, her first album in over two years. The album harkened back to Ronstadt's country-rock and folk-rock heyday. She returned to her rock 'n' roll roots with vivid interpretations of songs by Bruce Springsteen, Doc Pomus, Bob Dylan, and John Hiatt. The recording was produced by Glyn Johns. A commercial failure, the album stood at 57,897 copies sold at the time of its deletion in 2008. It is the poorest-selling studio album in Ronstadt's Elektra/Asylum catalog. We Ran did not chart any singles but it was well received by critics.

Despite the lack of success of We Ran, Ronstadt kept moving towards this adult rock exploration. In the summer of 1999, she released the album Western Wall: The Tucson Sessions, a folk-rock-oriented project with Emmylou Harris. It earned a nomination for the Grammy Award for the Best Contemporary Folk Album and made the Top 10 of Billboard's Country Albums chart. Still in print as of December 2016, it has sold 223,255 copies per Nielsen SoundScan.

Also in 1999, Ronstadt went back to her concert roots when she performed with the Eagles and Jackson Browne at Staples Center's 1999 New Year's Eve celebration kicking off the December 31 end-of-the-millennium festivities. As Staples Center Senior Vice President and general manager Bobby Goldwater said, "It was our goal to present a spectacular event as a sendoff to the 20th century", and "Eagles, Jackson Browne, and Linda Ronstadt are three of the most popular acts of the century. Their performances will constitute a singular and historic night of entertainment for New Year's Eve in Los Angeles."

In 2000, Ronstadt completed her long contractual relationship with the Elektra/Asylum label. The fulfillment of this contract commenced with the release of A Merry Little Christmas, her first holiday collection, which includes rare choral works, the somber Joni Mitchell song "River", and a rare recorded duet with the late Rosemary Clooney on Clooney's signature song, "White Christmas".

Since leaving Warner Music, Ronstadt has gone on to release one album each under Verve and Vanguard Records.

Your musical soul is like facets of a jewel, and you stick out one facet at a time ... (and) I tend to work real hard on whatever it is I do, to get it up to speed, up to a professional level. I tend to bury myself in one thing for years at a time.

— Linda Ronstadt

In 2006, recording as the ZoZo Sisters, Ronstadt teamed with her new friend, musician and musical scholar Ann Savoy, to record Adieu False Heart. It was an album of roots music incorporating pop, Cajun, and early-20th-century music and released on the Vanguard Records label. But Adieu False Heart was a commercial failure, peaking at number 146 in the U.S. despite her touring for the final time that year. It was the last time Linda Ronstadt would record an album, having begun to lose her singing ability as a result of a degenerative condition later determined to be progressive supranuclear palsy, but initially diagnosed as Parkinson's disease, in December 2012. Adieu False Heart, recorded in Louisiana, features a cast of local musicians, including Chas Justus, Eric Frey and Kevin Wimmer of the Red Stick Ramblers, Sam Broussard of the Mamou Playboys, Dirk Powell, and Joel Savoy, as well as an array of Nashville musicians: fiddler Stuart Duncan, mandolinist Sam Bush, and guitarist Bryan Sutton. The recording earned two Grammy Award nominations: Best Traditional Folk Album and Best Engineered Album, Non-Classical.

In 2007, Ronstadt contributed to the compilation album We All Love Ella: Celebrating the First Lady of Song – a tribute album to jazz music's all-time most heralded artist – on the track "Miss Otis Regrets".

In August 2007, Ronstadt headlined the Newport Folk Festival, making her debut at this event, where she incorporated jazz, rock, and folk music into her repertoire. It was one of her final concerts.

In 2010, Ronstadt contributed the arrangement and lead vocal to "A La Orilla de un Palmar" on the Chieftains' studio album San Patricio (with Ry Cooder). This remains her most recent commercially available recording as lead vocalist.

=== Retirement ===
In 2011, Ronstadt was interviewed by the Arizona Daily Star and announced her retirement. In August 2013, she revealed to Alanna Nash, writing for AARP, that she had Parkinson's disease and could "no longer sing a note." Her diagnosis was subsequently re-evaluated as progressive supranuclear palsy. Her memoir Feels Like Home: A Song for the Sonoran Borderlands was published in 2022.

=== Selected career achievements ===
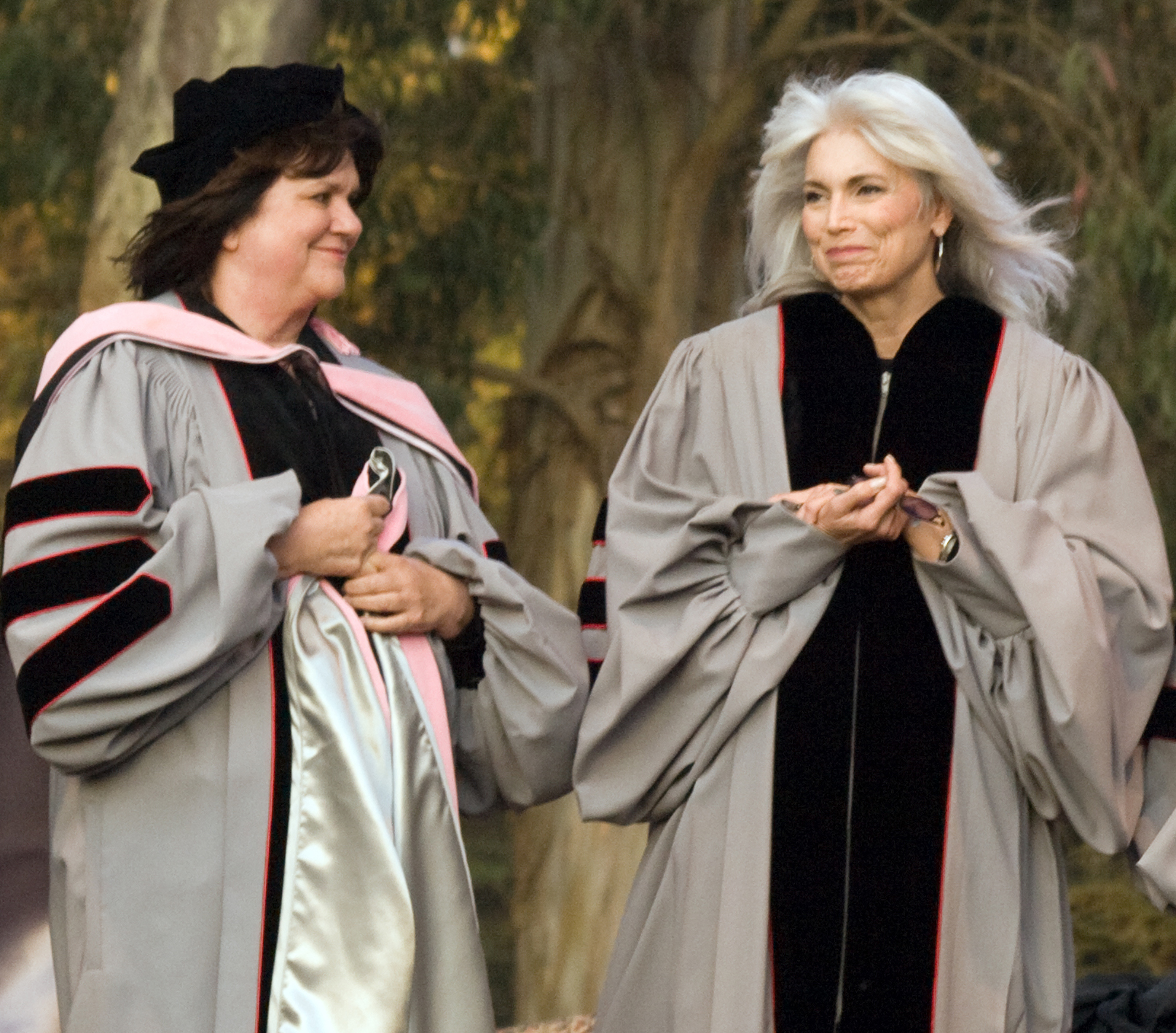
Ronstadt and Emmylou Harris receiving honors from Berklee, 2009

On April 10, 2014, Ronstadt was inducted into the Rock and Roll Hall of Fame. In July 2019, Ronstadt was selected as a Kennedy Center Honoree. On May 7, 2022, during the International Mariachi Conference, the Tucson Music Hall at the Tucson Convention Center was officially renamed as The Linda Ronstadt Music Hall.

As of 2019, Ronstadt had earned three number-one pop albums, 10 top-ten pop albums, and 38 charting pop albums on the Billboard Pop Album Charts. She has 15 albums on the Billboard Top Country Albums chart, including four that hit number one. Ronstadt's singles have earned her a number-one hit and three number-two hits on the Billboard Hot 100 chart, with 10 top-ten pop singles and 21 reaching the Top 40. She has also scored two number-one hits on the Billboard Hot Country Songs chart, and two number-one hits on the Billboard Adult Contemporary chart. Rolling Stone wrote that a whole generation "but for her, might never have heard the work of Buddy Holly, Chuck Berry, or Elvis Costello."

She has recorded and released over 30 studio albums and has made guest appearances on an estimated 120 albums by other artists. Her guest appearances included the classical minimalist Philip Glass's album Songs from Liquid Days, a hit classical record with other major pop stars either singing or writing lyrics (Ronstadt's two tracks on the album saw her singing lyrics written by Suzanne Vega and Laurie Anderson). She also appeared on Glass's follow-up recording 1000 Airplanes on the Roof. She appeared on Paul Simon's Graceland, where she sang a duet with Simon, "Under African Skies". In that song, there is a verse dedicated to Ronstadt, her voice and harmonies and her birth in Tucson, Arizona. She voiced herself in The Simpsons episode "Mr. Plow" and sang a duet, "Funny How Time Slips Away", with Homer Simpson on The Yellow Album.

Ronstadt has also appeared on albums by a vast range of artists including Emmylou Harris, the Chieftains, Dolly Parton, Neil Young, JD Souther, Gram Parsons, Bette Midler, Nitty Gritty Dirt Band, Earl Scruggs, the Eagles, Andrew Gold, Wendy Waldman, Hoyt Axton, Kate and Anna McGarrigle, Ann Savoy, Karla Bonoff, James Taylor, Jimmy Webb, Valerie Carter, Warren Zevon, Maria Muldaur, Randy Newman (specifically his musical adaptation of Faust), Nicolette Larson, the Seldom Scene, Rosemary Clooney, Aaron Neville, Rodney Crowell, Hearts and Flowers, Laurie Lewis and Flaco Jiménez. As a singer-songwriter, Ronstadt has written songs covered by several artists, such as "Try Me Again", covered by Trisha Yearwood; and "Winter Light", which was co-written and composed with Zbigniew Preisner and Eric Kaz, and covered by Sarah Brightman.

Her three biggest-selling studio albums to date are: her 1977 release Simple Dreams, 1983's What's New, and 1989's Cry Like A Rainstorm, Howl Like The Wind. Each one has been certified by the Recording Industry Association of America for over three million copies sold. Her highest-selling album to date is the 1976 compilation Greatest Hits, certified for over seven million units sold as of 2001. Ronstadt became music's first major touring female artist to sell out sizeable venues; she was also the top-grossing solo female concert artist for the 1970s. She remained a highly successful touring artist into the 1990s, at which time she decided to scale back to smaller venues. In the 1970s, Cashbox magazine, a competitor of Billboard during that time period, named Ronstadt the "No. 1 Female Artist of the Decade". "Rolling Stone's 500 Greatest Albums of All Time" included Heart Like a Wheel (1974) at number 164 and The Very Best Of Linda Ronstadt (2002) at number 324. The 2012 revision kept only the compilation, but raised it to the place once occupied by Heart Like a Wheel.

Ronstadt's album sales have not been certified since 2001. At that time, Ronstadt's U.S. album sales were certified by the Recording Industry Association of America at over 30 million albums sold; however, Peter Asher, her former producer and manager, placed her total U.S. album sales at over 45 million. Likewise, her worldwide albums sales are in excess of 100 million albums sold, according to the former president of Warner Bros. Records, Joe Smith, now a jury member of the Hit Parade Hall of Fame. Her RIAA certification (audits paid for by record companies or artists for promotion) tally as of 2001 totaled 19 Gold, 14 Platinum and 7 Multi-Platinum albums. She was the first female in music history to score three consecutive platinum albums and ultimately racked up a total of eight consecutive platinum albums. Her album Living in the USA was the first album by any recording artist in U.S. music history to ship double platinum (over two million advanced copies). Her first Latin release, the all-Spanish 1987 album Canciones De Mi Padre, stands as the best-selling non-English-language album in American music history. As of 2013, it had sold over 2 1/2 million U.S. copies.

Ronstadt has served as producer on albums from various musicians that include her distant cousin David Lindley, Aaron Neville, and singer-songwriter Jimmy Webb. She produced Cristal – Glass Music Through the Ages, an album of classical music using glass instruments with Dennis James, where she sang on several of the arrangements. In 1999, Ronstadt also produced the Grammy Award-winning Trio II. She has received a total of 27 Grammy Award nominations in various fields that include rock, country, pop and Tropical Latin, and has won 11 Grammy Awards in the categories of Pop, Country, Tropical Latin, Musical Album for Children and Mexican-American. In 2016, Ronstadt was again honored by the National Academy of Recording Arts and Sciences with the Lifetime Achievement Grammy.

She was the first female solo artist to have two Top 5 singles simultaneously on Billboard magazine's Hot 100: "Blue Bayou" and "It's So Easy". By December of that year, both "Blue Bayou" and "It's So Easy" had climbed into Billboard's Top 5 and remained there for the month's last four weeks. In 1999, Ronstadt ranked number 21 in VH1's 100 Greatest Women of Rock & Roll. Three years later, she ranked number 40 in CMT's 40 Greatest Women in Country Music. In 2023, Rolling Stone ranked Ronstadt at No. 47 on their list of the 200 Greatest Singers of All Time.

== Personal life ==
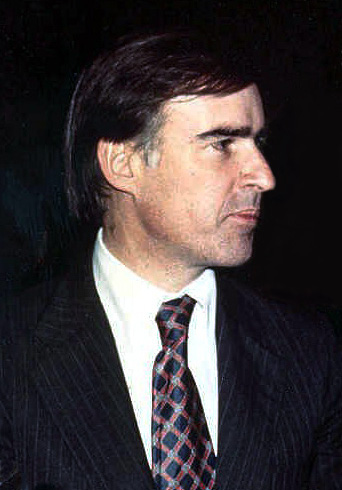
Jerry Brown (pictured) had a high-profile relationship with Ronstadt when he was the governor of California in the late 1970s.

In the early 1970s, Ronstadt briefly dated fellow musician JD Souther, who co-produced her Don't Cry Now album. Beginning in the mid-1970s, Ronstadt's private life became increasingly public. It was fueled by a relationship with then-Governor of California Jerry Brown, a Democratic presidential candidate. They shared a Newsweek magazine cover in April 1979, as well as the covers of Us Weekly and People magazine.

In 1983, Ronstadt dated comedian Jim Carrey for eight months. From the end of 1983 to 1988, Ronstadt was engaged to Star Wars director and creator George Lucas.

In December 1990, she adopted an infant daughter, Mary Clementine Ronstadt. In 1994, she adopted a baby boy, Carlos Ronstadt. Ronstadt has never married. Speaking of finding an acceptable mate, in 1974 she told Peter Knobler in Crawdaddy, "... he's real kind but isn't inspired musically and then you meet somebody else that's just so inspired musically that he just takes your breath away but he's such a moron, such a maniac that you can't get along with him. And then after that it's the problem of finding someone that can stand you!"

In the late 1980s, after living in Los Angeles for 30 years, Ronstadt moved to San Francisco because she said she never felt at home in Southern California. "Los Angeles became too enclosing an environment", she says. "I couldn't breathe the air and I didn't want to drive on the freeways to get to the studio. I also didn't want to embrace the values that have been so completely embraced by that city. Are you glamorous? Are you rich? Are you important? Do you have clout? It's just not me and it never was me." In 1997, Ronstadt sold her home in San Francisco and moved back to her hometown of Tucson, Arizona, to raise her two children. In more recent years, Ronstadt moved back to San Francisco while continuing to maintain her home in Tucson.

In 2009, in honor of Ronstadt, the Martin Guitar Company made a 00–42 model "Linda Ronstadt Limited Edition" acoustic guitar. Ronstadt appointed the Land Institute as recipient of all proceeds from her signature guitar.

In 2013, Simon & Schuster published her autobiography, Simple Dreams: A Musical Memoir, as well as the Spanish version, Sueños Sencillos – Memorias Musicales.

In August 2013, Ronstadt revealed she was diagnosed with Parkinson's disease, leaving her unable to sing due to loss of muscular control, which is common to Parkinson's patients. She was diagnosed eight months prior to the announcement and had initially attributed the symptoms she had been experiencing to the aftereffects of shoulder surgery and a tick bite. In late 2019, it was reported her doctors had revised their diagnosis to progressive supranuclear palsy, a degenerative disease commonly mistaken for Parkinson's due to the similarity of the symptoms.

Ronstadt describes herself as a "spiritual atheist".

=== Political activism ===
Ronstadt's politics received criticism and praise during and after her July 17, 2004, performance at the Aladdin Theatre for the Performing Arts in Las Vegas. Toward the end of the show, as she had done across the country, Ronstadt spoke to the audience, praising Fahrenheit 9/11, Michael Moore's documentary film about the Iraq War; she dedicated the song "Desperado" to Moore. Accounts say the crowd's initial reaction was mixed, with "half the crowd heartily applauding her praise for Moore, (and) the other half booing."

Following the concert, news accounts reported Ronstadt was "evicted" from the hotel premises. Ronstadt's comments, as well as the reactions of some audience members and the hotel, became a topic of discussion nationwide. Aladdin casino president Bill Timmins and Michael Moore each made public statements about the controversy.

The incident prompted international headlines and debate on an entertainer's right to express a political opinion from the stage and made the editorial section of The New York Times. Following the incident, many friends of Ronstadt's, including the Eagles, immediately cancelled their engagements at the Aladdin. Ronstadt also received telegrams of support from her rock 'n' roll friends around the world such as the Rolling Stones, the Eagles and Elton John. Amid reports of mixed public response, Ronstadt continued her praise of Moore and his film throughout her 2004 and 2006 summer concerts across North America.

At a 2006 concert in Canada, Ronstadt told the Calgary Sun that she was "embarrassed George Bush (was) from the United States. ... He's an idiot. ... He's enormously incompetent on both the domestic and international scenes. ... Now the fact that we were lied to about the reasons for entering into war against Iraq and thousands of people have died‍—‌it's just as immoral as racism." Her remarks drew international headlines. In an August 14, 2007, interview, she commented on all her well-publicized, outspoken views, in particular the Aladdin incident, by noting, "If I had it to do over I would be much more gracious to everyone ... you can be as outspoken as you want if you are very, very respectful. Show some grace".

In 2007, Ronstadt resided in San Francisco while also maintaining her home in Tucson. That same year, she drew criticism and praise from Tucsonans for commenting that local city council's failings, developers' strip mall mentality, greed and growing dust problem had rendered the city unrecognizable and poorly developed.

In August 2009, Ronstadt, in a well-publicized interview to PlanetOut Inc. titled "Linda Ronstadt's Gay Mission", championed gay rights and same-sex marriage, and stated "homophobia is anti-family values. Period, end of story."

On January 16, 2010, Ronstadt converged with thousands of other activists in a "National Day of Action". Ronstadt stated that her "dog in the fight" – as a native Arizonan and coming from a law enforcement family – was the treatment of illegal aliens and Arizona's enforcement of its illegal immigrant law, especially Maricopa County Sheriff Joe Arpaio's efforts in that area.

On April 29, 2010, Ronstadt began a campaign, including joining a lawsuit, against Arizona's new illegal-immigration law SB 1070 calling it a "devastating blow to law enforcement ... the police don't protect us in a democracy with brute force", something she said she learned from her brother Peter, who was Chief of Police in Tucson.

Ronstadt has also been outspoken on environmental and community issues. She is a major supporter and admirer of sustainable agriculture pioneer Wes Jackson, saying in 2000, "the work he's doing right now is the most important work there is in the (United States)", and dedicating the rock anthem "Desperado" to him at an August 2007 concert in Kansas City, Kansas.

Ronstadt endorsed Kamala Harris for the 2024 US presidential election.

=== National arts advocacy ===
In the United States we spend millions of dollars on sports because it promotes teamwork, discipline, and the experience of learning to make great progress in small increments. Learning to play music together does all this and more.

— Congressional testimony from Linda Ronstadt

In 2004, Ronstadt wrote the foreword to the book The NPR Curious Listener's Guide to American Folk Music, and in 2005, she wrote the introduction to the book Classic Ferrington Guitars, about luthier Danny Ferrington and the custom guitars that he created for Ronstadt and other musicians such as Elvis Costello, Ry Cooder, and Kurt Cobain.

Ronstadt has been honored for her contribution to the American arts. On September 23, 2007, she was inducted into the Arizona Music & Entertainment Hall of Fame, along with Stevie Nicks, Buck Owens, and filmmaker Steven Spielberg. On August 17, 2008, Ronstadt received a tribute by various artists, including BeBe Winans and Wynonna Judd, when she was honored with the Trailblazer Award, presented to her by Plácido Domingo at the 2008 ALMA Awards, a ceremony later televised in the U.S. on ABC.

In 2008, Ronstadt was appointed artistic director of the San José Mariachi and Mexican Heritage Festival. On March 31, 2009, in testimony that the Los Angeles Times termed "remarkable", Ronstadt spoke to the United States Congress House Appropriations Subcommittee on Interior, Environment & Related Agencies, attempting to convince lawmakers to budget $200 million in the 2010 fiscal year for the National Endowment of the Arts.

In May 2009, Ronstadt received an honorary doctorate of music degree from the Berklee College of Music for her achievements and influence in music and her contributions to American and international culture. Mix magazine stated that "Linda Ronstadt (has) left her mark on more than the record business; her devotion to the craft of singing influenced many audio professionals ... (and is) intensely knowledgeable about the mechanics of singing and the cultural contexts of every genre she passes".

== Awards and nominations ==
=== Grammy Awards ===
Year	Category	Nominated work	Result	Ref.
1971	Best Contemporary Vocal Performance, Female	"Long, Long Time"	Nominated	
1976	Album of the Year	Heart Like a Wheel	Nominated	
1976	Best Contemporary Vocal Performance, Female	Heart Like a Wheel	Nominated	
1976	Best Country Vocal Performance, Female	"I Can't Help It (If I'm Still in Love with You)"	Won	
1977	Best Contemporary Vocal Performance, Female	Hasten Down the Wind	Won	
1978	Best Contemporary Vocal Performance, Female	"Blue Bayou"	Nominated	
1978	Record of the Year	"Blue Bayou"	Nominated	
1981	Best Rock Vocal Performance, Female	"How Do I Make You"	Nominated	
1983	Best Rock Vocal Performance, Female	"Get Closer"	Nominated	
1983	Best Female Vocal Pop Performance	Get Closer	Nominated	
1984	Best Female Vocal Pop Performance	What's New	Nominated	
1986	Best Female Vocal Pop Performance	Lush Life	Nominated	
1988	Album of the Year	Trio (with Dolly Parton and Emmylou Harris)	Nominated	
1988	Best Country Performance by a Duo or Group with Vocal	Trio (with Dolly Parton and Emmylou Harris)	Won	
1988	Best Pop Performance by a Duo or Group with Vocals	"Somewhere Out There" (with James Ingram)	Nominated	
1989	Best Mexican-American Performance	Canciones de Mi Padre	Won	
1990	Best Female Vocal Pop Performance	Cry Like a Rainstorm, Howl Like the Wind	Nominated	
1990	Best Pop Performance by a Duo or Group with Vocals	"Don't Know Much" (with Aaron Neville)	Won	
1991	Best Pop Performance by a Duo or Group with Vocals	"All My Life" (with Aaron Neville)	Won	
1993	Best Tropical Latin Album	Frenesí	Won	
1993	Best Mexican-American Album	Mas Canciones	Won	
1997	Best Musical Album for Children	Dedicated to the One I Love	Won	
2000	Best Country Album	Trio II (with Dolly Parton and Emmylou Harris)	Nominated	
2000	Best Contemporary Folk Album	Western Wall: The Tucson Sessions (with Emmylou Harris)	Nominated	
2000	Best Country Collaboration with Vocals	"After the Gold Rush" (with Dolly Parton and Emmylou Harris)	Won	
2007	Best Traditional Folk Album	Adieu False Heart (with Ann Savoy)	Nominated	
2016	Lifetime Achievement Award		Won	
2021	Best Music Film	Linda Ronstadt: The Sound of My Voice	Won	

- In 1981 the album In Harmony: A Sesame Street Record won the Grammy for Best Album for Children. Ronstadt was one of the various artists featured on the album. The Grammys were awarded to the producers, David Levine and Lucy Simon.

=== Latin Grammy Awards ===
Year	Category	Nominated work	Result	Ref.
2011	Lifetime Achievement Award		Won	

=== Primetime Emmy Awards ===
Year	Category	Nominated work	Result	Ref.
1989	Outstanding Individual Performance in a Variety or Music Program	Canciones de Mi Padre (Great Performances)	Won	

=== Tony Awards ===
Year	Category	Nominated work	Result	Ref.
1981	Best Performance by a Leading Actress in a Musical	The Pirates of Penzance	Nominated	

=== Golden Globe Awards ===
Year	Category	Nominated work	Result	Ref.
1983	Best Actress – Motion Picture Comedy or Musical	The Pirates of Penzance	Nominated	

=== Arizona Music and Entertainment Hall of Fame ===
- 2007 – Inducted for her significant impact on the evolution and development of the entertainment culture in the state of Arizona

=== Academy of Country Music ===
- 1974 – Best New Female Artist
- 1987 – Album of the Year/ Trio, Dolly Parton, Linda Ronstadt and Emmylou Harris

=== Country Music Association ===
- 1988 – Vocal Event of the Year / Trio, Dolly Parton, Linda Ronstadt and Emmylou Harris

=== American Latino Media Arts ===
- 2008 – Trailblazer Award for Contribution to American Music

=== Lo Nuestro nominations ===
- 1989 – Regional Mexican Female Artist, Regional Mexican Album (Canciones de Mi Padre), and Crossover Artist
- 1992 – Regional Mexican Female Artist
- 1993 – Tropical Female Artist, Regional Mexican Female Artist, and Tropical Song ("Perfidia").

=== Kennedy Center ===
- 2019 Kennedy Center Honoree

== Discography ==
Studio albums

- Linda Ronstadt, Stone Poneys and Friends, Vol. III (1968) (with the Stone Poneys)
- Hand Sown ... Home Grown (1969)
- Silk Purse (1970)
- Linda Ronstadt (1972)
- Don't Cry Now (1973)
- Heart Like a Wheel (1974)
- Prisoner in Disguise (1975)
- Hasten Down the Wind (1976)
- Simple Dreams (1977)
- Living in the USA (1978)
- Mad Love (1980)
- Get Closer (1982)
- What's New (1983)
- Lush Life (1984)
- For Sentimental Reasons (1986)
- Trio (1987) (with Emmylou Harris and Dolly Parton)
- Canciones de Mi Padre (1987)
- Cry Like a Rainstorm, Howl Like the Wind (1989)
- Mas Canciones (1991)
- Frenesí (1992)
- Winter Light (1993)
- Feels Like Home (1995)
- Dedicated to the One I Love (1996)
- We Ran (1998)
- Trio II (1999) (Emmylou Harris and Dolly Parton)
- Western Wall: The Tucson Sessions (1999) (with Emmylou Harris)
- A Merry Little Christmas (2000)
- Hummin' to Myself (2004)
- Adieu False Heart (2006) (with Ann Savoy)

== Books ==
- Ronstadt, Linda (2013). Simple Dreams: A Musical Memoir (First Simon & Schuster hardcover ed.). New York: Simon & Schuster. ISBN 978-1-4516-6872-8. OCLC 829743967.
- Ronstadt, Linda (2022). Feels Like Home: A Song for the Sonoran Borderlands. New York: Heyday Books. ISBN 978-1597145794. OCLC 1290245461.
