= Winter Light (Linda Ronstadt album) =

Studio album by Linda Ronstadt
- Released: November 23, 1993
- Recorded: 1993
- Studio: The Site (San Rafael, California); Skywalker Ranch (California)
- Genre: Pop; new age; art rock
- Length: 37:06
- Label: Elektra/WEA International
- Producer: George Massenburg, Linda Ronstadt

Linda Ronstadt chronology
Frenesí (1992)	Winter Light (1993)	Feels Like Home (1995)

Singles from Winter Light
- 1. "Heartbeats Accelerating" Released: December 1993; 2. "Winter Light" Released: January 1994; 3. "Adónde Voy" Released: February 1994; 4. "A River for Him" Released: March 1994; 5. "Oh No Not My Baby" Released: March 1994; 6. "Anyone Who Had a Heart" Released: 1994

Winter Light is an album by American singer Linda Ronstadt, released in late 1993 to critical acclaim and commercial disappointment.

== History ==
Winter Light was Ronstadt's first solo album since Don't Cry Now not to be produced by Peter Asher; she elected to produce it herself, along with George Massenburg. The album marked Ronstadt's increased responsibilities and confidence behind the boards, this time achieving a multi-layered Enya-styled New Age-oriented sound, as in Anna McGarrigle's "Heartbeats Accelerating" — the album's first hit single — and Brian Wilson's "Don't Talk (Put Your Head on my Shoulder)". "Heartbeats Accelerating" featured a popular music video while another track, a remake of the classic 1960s R&B hit, "Oh No Not My Baby", was a Top 30 Adult Contemporary hit for Linda in the spring of 1994.

Other aspects of the album show Ronstadt paying tribute to great female vocalists of the 1960s, with a combination of rock n roll, oldies, and rock ballads. Three of the songs - "Anyone Who Had A Heart", "Oh No Not My Baby", and "I Just Don't Know What to Do with Myself" - had been previously recorded by Dusty Springfield. Ronstadt selected classic compositions from various songwriters such as Burt Bacharach, Carole King, and Jimmy Webb, as well as from contemporary ones such as Tish Hinojosa. The album also showcased Ronstadt the singer-songwriter and music arranger, introducing her own composition, "Winter Light," which was notably covered by Sarah Brightman on her 2001 album, Classics and Chloë Agnew for her Walking In The Air album.

The title track was also prominently used in the 1993 film The Secret Garden, but was not featured on the film's original soundtrack release.

== Critical reception ==
Professional ratings
Review scores
Source	Rating
AllMusic	3/5 stars
Los Angeles Times	2.5/4 stars
Music Week	2/5 stars
Q	4/5 stars
Rolling Stone	4/5 stars

Winter Light is considered to be one of Ronstadt's best and most underrated recordings. Rolling Stone rated the album '4' (out of a possible '5') stars. However, it was a commercial failure for Ronstadt and peaked at a disappointing #92 on the Billboard album chart. The disc had modest sales, moving 248,410 copies in the United States. In 2008, it became Ronstadt's first Elektra/Asylum release to be taken out of print (In 2009, several more classic Ronstadt albums were deleted from her catalog).

Allmusic critic Jose Promis praised the album and wrote, "Winter Light could arguably be classified as Linda Ronstadt's best pop album of the 1990s... there is not a single dud on this impeccably produced album, which, in fact, gets better and better with each listening. This sadly overlooked album is nothing short of a shining gem, and an absolute must for fans of this amazing singer."

== Track listing ==
No.	Title	Writer(s)	Length
1.	"Heartbeats Accelerating"	Anna McGarrigle	3:49
2.	"Do What You Gotta Do"	Jimmy Webb	3:24
3.	"Anyone Who Had a Heart"	Burt Bacharach, Hal David	3:26
4.	"Don't Talk (Put Your Head on My Shoulder)"	Brian Wilson, Tony Asher	3:15
5.	"Oh No Not My Baby"	Gerry Goffin, Carole King	3:05
6.	"It's Too Soon to Know"	Deborah Chessler	2:30
7.	"I Just Don't Know What to Do with Myself"	Burt Bacharach, Hal David	3:11
8.	"A River for Him"	Emmylou Harris	4:31
9.	"Adonde Voy" (Where I Am Going)	Tish Hinojosa	3:09
10.	"You Can't Treat the Wrong Man Right"	Jimmy Webb	3:29
11.	"Winter Light"	Eric Kaz, Linda Ronstadt, Zbigniew Antoni Preisner	3:17
Total length:			37:06

The original 1993 USA release as Elektra 61545-2 had the songs on the back of the tray card listed incorrectly. There is no track number 8 listed. The listing order goes from track 7 to track 9. The glitch had gone unnoticed when it went into print. Although all the songs are listed there, it would give the impression that there are twelve tracks on the CD instead of eleven. The discrepancy would then be noticed when the CD was being played because the playback readout would truly show its eleven tracks.

== Personnel ==
Musicians

- Linda Ronstadt – lead vocals, backing vocals (1, 4, 8, 10, 11)
- Robbie Buchanan – synthesizers (1, 3, 4, 8–11), acoustic piano (2–4, 8–11), Hammond B3 organ (2, 4, 7, 10), electric piano (3, 7)
- Matt Rollings – acoustic piano (5–7, 10)
- Dean Parks – guitars (1, 2, 4–10), acoustic guitar (2), electric guitar (3), mandolin (9)
- Bob Glaub – bass guitar (1, 2)
- Leland Sklar – bass guitar (3–10)
- Russ Kunkel – drums, percussion (all tracks)
- Emil Richards – vibraphone (3)
- Dennis James – glass harmonica (1, 8, 9)
- David Boroff – tenor saxophone (3)
- Plas Johnson – tenor saxophone (9)
- Jon Clarke – alto flute (8), bass flute (8), recorder (9)
- David Campbell – orchestra arrangements and conductor (3, 5, 7–9)
- Valerie Carter – backing vocals (1)
- Alex Brown – backing vocals (2, 3, 5, 7, 10)
- Mortonette Jenkins – backing vocals (2, 3, 5, 7, 10)
- Marlena Jeter – backing vocals (2, 3, 5, 7, 10)
- Donny Gerrard – backing vocals (6)
- Arnold McCuller – backing vocals (6)
- Aaron Neville – backing vocals (6)
- Josef Powell – backing vocals (6)

Production

- George Massenburg – producer, engineer, mixing
- Linda Ronstadt – producer, mixing, engineer
- Peter Asher – co-producer (1, 4)
- Steve Tyrell – co-producer (3, 5–7)
- Kevin Scott – assistant engineer
- Craig Silvey – assistant engineer
- Doug Sax – mastering
- Gavin Lurssen – mastering
- John Kosh – art direction, design
- Robert Blakeman – photography

Studios

- Recorded at The Site and Skywalker Ranch (Marin County, California); Conway Studios (Hollywood, California)
- Mastered at The Mastering Lab (Hollywood, California)

== Charts ==
Chart performance for Winter Light
Chart (1994)	Peak position
Australian Albums (ARIA)	98
US Billboard 200	92

== Release history ==
Release history and formats for Winter Light
Region	Date	Format	Label	Ref.
North America	November 23, 1993	CD; cassette	Elektra Records	
