= George Massenburg =

American Audio engineer and inventor

- Born: George Yellott Massenburg; August 1947 (age 79); Baltimore, Maryland, U.S.
- Education: Baltimore Polytechnic Institute, Johns Hopkins University
- Occupations: Record producer; audio engineer; entrepreneur
- Years active: 1962–present
- Musical career
- Genres: R&B; Country; pop

George Yellott Massenburg (born August 1947) is a recording engineer and inventor. He has five Grammy Awards and 11 nominations. Working principally in Baltimore, Los Angeles, Nashville, and Macon, Georgia, Massenburg is widely known for submitting a paper to the Audio Engineering Society in 1972 regarding the parametric equalizer.

== Career ==
At 15, Massenburg worked part-time both in the recording studio and in an electronics laboratory. He attended Baltimore Polytechnic Institute and Johns Hopkins University, majoring in electrical engineering. As a sophomore, he left the University and never returned.

Massenburg authored a technical paper entitled "parametric equalization" which was presented at the 42nd convention of the Audio Engineering Society in 1972. He is regularly published in professional journals and trade magazines worldwide. In 1973 and 1974, he was chief engineer of Studio Europa-Sonor in Paris, France, and helped Gerhard Lehner install the expanded Neve 80 Series mixing console at Barclay Records studio on Avenue Hoche. During those years, Massenburg also did freelance engineering and equipment design in Europe.

Massenburg participated (individually and collaboratively) in over four hundred record albums over the past 45 years. His work includes recordings of Earth, Wind & Fire, James Taylor, Billy Joel, Toto, Dixie Chicks, Journey, Madeleine Peyroux, Little Feat, Weather Report, Randy Newman, Valerie Carter, Lyle Lovett, Aaron Neville, Kenny Loggins, Mary Chapin Carpenter, Linda Ronstadt, Herbie Hancock, The Seldom Scene, and many more.

He has designed, built and managed several recording studios, notably ITI Studios in Hunt Valley, Maryland, Blue Seas Recording in Baltimore, and The Complex in Los Angeles.

Massenburg began working with Maurice White in 1973. At White's ARC compound, he built the recording console and control room using custom-built equipment. He also contributed to the acoustical and architectural design of numerous other studios, including Skywalker Sound and The Site in Marin County, California.

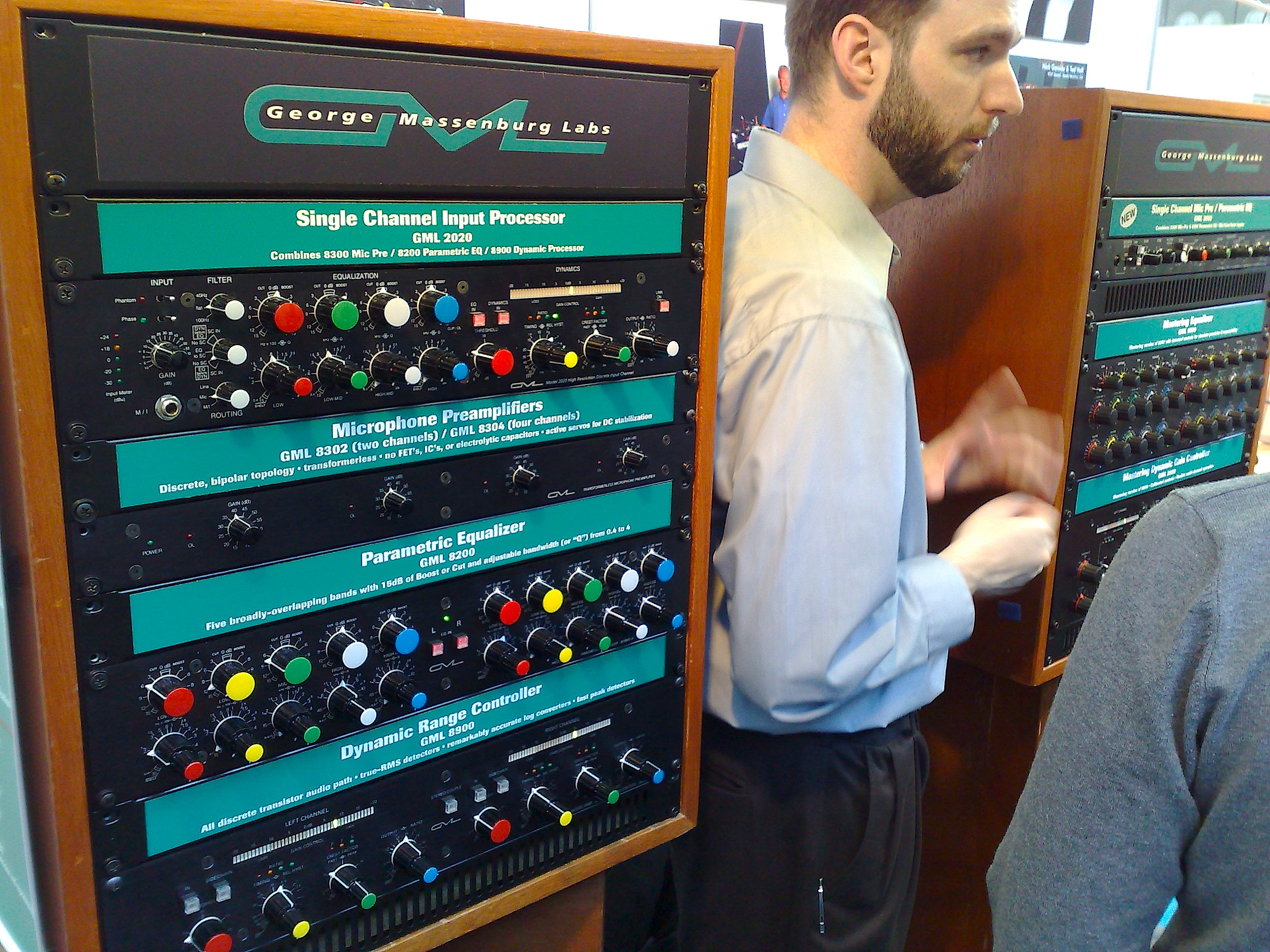
George Massenburg Labs's booth on the AES Convention

Massenburg is also an Associate Professor of Sound Recording at the Schulich School of Music at McGill University in Montreal, Quebec, Canada and a Visiting Lecturer at the University of California, Los Angeles, the University of Southern California, the Berklee College of Music in Boston, and the University of Memphis in Memphis, TN.

=== GML ===
In 1982, Massenburg founded George Massenburg Labs (GML), an audio electronics company that has released console automation devices, analog signal processors, microphone preamplifiers and power supplies, all based on his original circuit designs. GML's products include the GML 8200 Parametric Equalizer and the GML 8900 Dynamic Range Controller, which uses loudness-based rather than voltage-based dynamic range processing. GML also consults and does independent design for several major audio electronics manufacturers.

== Awards and honors ==
He won the Academy of Country Music award for record of the year in 1988, the Mix Magazine TEC Awards for Producer and Engineer of the year in 1989, the TEC Awards Hall of Fame in 1990 and the Engineer of the year award in 1992. He won a Grammy in 1996, and the Special Merit/Technical Grammy Award in 1998. In 2005, Massenburg was inducted into the TECnology Hall of Fame for his 1969 invention of the ITI ME-230 Parametric Equalizer. In 2009, he was awarded an honorary Doctorate of Music by Boston’s Berklee College of Music. In 2008 he received the AES Gold Medal.

== Personal life ==
Massenburg married Carol "Cookie" Rankin in Mabou, Nova Scotia on July 27, 2001, when he was 54 and she 36. Rankin is one of the founding members of the Rankin Family, a Celtic folk/country band from Cape Breton who were very popular in Canada during the 1990s. She and Massenburg live in Montreal, Quebec, Franklin, Tennessee and Mabou, Cape Breton, Nova Scotia. He has one son, Sam, an electronic musician and performer.
