= Martha Wainwright discography =

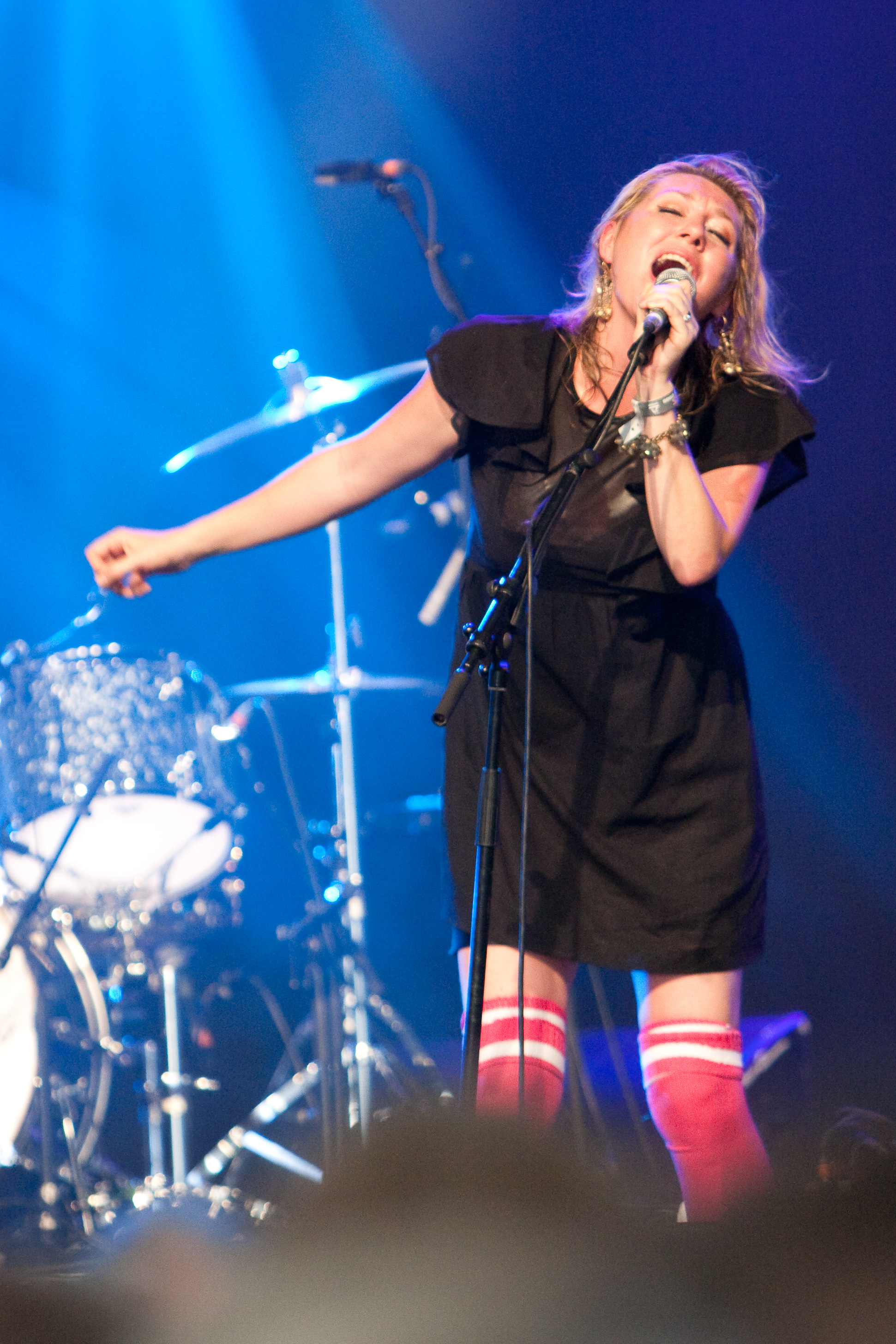
- Martha Wainwright singing at the 2008 Cambridge Folk Festival
- Studio albums: 6
- Extended plays: 5
- Soundtrack albums: 1
- Live albums: 1
- Singles: 6
- Music videos: 10
- Collaborative albums: 1

The discography of Martha Wainwright, a Canadian-American singer-songwriter, consists of six studio albums, one live album, one soundtrack album, five extended plays (EPs), six singles (including one as a featured artist), and ten music videos. Wainwright's self-titled debut album was released through Zoë Records and Drowned in Sound in April 2005. Although its success was limited, Wainwright reached number 43 on Billboard's Top Heatseekers chart. Wainwright's second album, I Know You're Married But I've Got Feelings Too, was released through the same labels in June 2008, resulting in a No. 10 position on the Top Heatseekers chart and No. 6 in Canada, among other chart positions throughout Europe and Australia. Sans Fusils, Ni Souliers, à Paris: Martha Wainwright's Piaf Record, a tribute to legendary French singer Édith Piaf, was released in November 2009.

Wainwright's first release was an album-length independent cassette of ten tracks, Ground Floor, in 1997. This was followed in 1999 by her first EP, released under Querbes Service in 1999; two of its songs would later appear on her debut album (2005). Wainwright released two EPs in 2005—Bloody Mother Fucking Asshole and I Will Internalize—both of which contained some tracks that also appeared on her self-titled studio album. The EP iTunes Live from Montreal was released digitally in December 2008 in Canada, and contained six live tracks from her second album, I Know You're Married But I've Got Feelings Too.

Wainwright's singles include "Factory", "When the Day Is Short", "Far Away", "Set the Fire to the Third Bar" (Snow Patrol featuring Wainwright), and "Bleeding All Over You". She has contributed songs to various soundtracks and compilation albums, including Tommy Tricker and the Stamp Traveller (1988), The Aviator (2004), Leonard Cohen: I'm Your Man (2005), and Song of America (2007). Wainwright has contributed backing vocals to all of her brother's (Rufus Wainwright) albums, and was a featured performer on his 2007 tribute album, Rufus Does Judy at Carnegie Hall.

== Albums ==
=== Studio albums ===
Title	Album details	Peak chart positions									
Title	Album details	US Heat	AUS	BEL	CAN	DEN	NLD	NOR	SWE	UK	SCO
Ground Floor	Released: 1997; Label: Self-released; Formats: Cassette only	—	—	—	—	—	—	—	—	—	—
Martha Wainwright	Released: April 2005; Label: Zoë/Drowned in Sound; Formats: CD	43	—	—	18	—	—	39	49	63	53
I Know You're Married But I've Got Feelings Too	Released: May 10, 2008; Label: Zoë; Formats: CD	10	19	40	6	19	63	12	15	29	28
Come Home to Mama	Released: October 16, 2012; Label: V2/Cooperative Music US; Formats: CD, vinyl	21	77	93	6	—	—	—	—	58	73
Goodnight City	Released: November 11, 2016; Label: Cadence Music Group; Formats: CD, digital download, vinyl	—	—	195	41	—	—	—	—	— (Note: Goodnight City did not enter the UK Album Chart but did peak at number 24 on the UK Independent Albums Chart.)	—
Love Will Be Reborn	Released: August 20, 2021; Label: Pheromone, Cooking Vinyl; Formats: CD, digital download, vinyl	—	—	—	—	—	—	—	—	— (Note: Love Will Be Reborn did not enter the UK Album Chart but did peak at number 12 on the UK Independent Albums Chart.)	21
"—" denotes releases that did not chart.

=== Live albums ===
Title	Album details	Peak chart positions	
Title	Album details	CAN	NOR
Sans Fusils, Ni Souliers, à Paris: Martha Wainwright's Piaf Record	Released: November 2009; Label: V2; Format: CD	25	29

=== Collaborative albums ===
Title	Album details
The Wainwright Sisters: Songs in the Dark	Released: November 13, 2015; Label: PIAS; Format: CD, digital download, double vinyl

=== Soundtrack albums ===
Title	Album details
Trauma: Chansons de la Série Télé, Saison 4	Released: February 26, 2013; Label: MapleMusic; Formats: CD, digital download

== Extended plays ==
Title	EP details	Notes
Martha Wainwright	Released: 1999; Label: Querbes Service; Format: CD	Contains six songs, two of which appeared on Wainwright's debut album ("G.P.T." and "Don't Forget") and one of which appeared on I Know You're Married But I've Got Feelings Too ("Jimi")
Factory	Released: 2001; Label: Querbes Service; Formant: CD	Contains four songs, "Factory", "Car Song", Bye Bye Blackbird" and "New York, New York, New York" . All songs by Martha Wainwright except "Bye Bye Blackbird" (Ray Henderson/Mort Dixon).
Bloody Mother Fucking Asshole	Released: January 25, 2005; Label: Zoë/Drowned in Sound; Format: CD	Contains five tracks, including two that appeared on Wainwright's debut album and a cover of "How Soon" (C. Lucas/J. Owens)
I Will Internalize	Released: November 29, 2005; Label: MapleMusic; Formats: CD	Contains five tracks, three of which appeared as bonus tracks on Wainwright's debut album ("Baby", "Bring Back My Heart", and a cover of Barbara's "Dis, Quand Reviendras-tu?")
iTunes Live from Montreal	Released: December 9, 2008; Label: iTunes; Formats: Digital download	Contains six tracks that appear on I Know You're Married But I've Got Feelings Too; released via iTunes in Canada

== Singles ==
=== As lead artist ===
Title	Year	Album
"Factory"	2005	Martha Wainwright
"When the Day Is Short"	2005	Martha Wainwright
"Far Away"	2005	Martha Wainwright
"Bleeding All Over You"	2008	I Know You're Married But I've Got Feelings Too
"Wolves" (featuring Rufus Wainwright)	2020	–

=== As featured artist ===
List of singles as featured artist, with selected chart positions and certifications, showing year released and album name
Title	Year	Peak chart positions				Certifications	Album
Title	Year	US	BEL	IRL	UK	Certifications	Album
"Set the Fire to the Third Bar" (Snow Patrol featuring Martha Wainwright)	2006	54	41	22	18	BPI: Gold	Eyes Open

== Other charted songs ==
List of singles as featured artist, with selected chart positions and certifications, showing year released and album name
Title	Year	Peak chart positions		Album
Title	Year	AUT	SWI	Album
"Dans le silence"	2013	46	73	Trauma: Chansons de la Série Télé, Saison #4

== Music videos ==
Title	Year	Album	Director
"When the Day Is Short"	2005	Martha Wainwright	Sara Mishara
"You Cheated Me"	2009	I Know You're Married But I've Got Feelings Too	Maxime Giroux
"Proserpina"	2012	Come Home To Mama	Matthu Placek
"Radio Star"	2012	Come Home To Mama	Annavan
The Wainwright Sisters: "El Cóndor Pasa"	2016	Songs in the Dark	
"Around the Bend"	2016	Goodnight City	
"Love Will Be Reborn"	2021	Love Will Be Reborn	Josh Usheroff
"Falaise de Malaise" (Lyric Video)	2021	Love Will Be Reborn	Ryan Brough
"Hole In My Heart"	2021	Love Will Be Reborn	Nick Jewell
"Middle of the Lake"	2021	Love Will Be Reborn	Lauren Guarneri

== Other contributions ==
=== Soundtracks ===
Year	Album	Song(s)	Label	Ref.
1988	Tommy Tricker and the Stamp Traveller	"Tommy Come Back"	Les Éditions La Fête	
2004	The Aviator	"I'll Be Seeing You"	Sony	
2006	Leonard Cohen: I'm Your Man	"The Traitor"	Verve Forecast	

=== Compilations ===
Year	Album	Song(s)	Label	Ref.
2000	Simply Mad... About the Loser's Lounge	"The Name of the Game"	Zilcho	
2006	Artists Den: Volume III The Hudson St. Recordings	"I Will Internalize"		
2007	Song of America	"I Am Woman"	31 Tigers	
2009	Great Canadian Song Quest	"Four Black Sheep in the Night"	CBC Records	
2013	Sing Me the Songs: Celebrating the Works of Kate McGarrigle	"Kiss and Say Goodbye"	Nonesuch	
2013	Sing Me the Songs: Celebrating the Works of Kate McGarrigle	Matapedia	Nonesuch	
2013	Sing Me the Songs: Celebrating the Works of Kate McGarrigle	Tell My Sister	Nonesuch	
2013	Sing Me the Songs: Celebrating the Works of Kate McGarrigle	First Born	Nonesuch	
2013	Sing Me the Songs: Celebrating the Works of Kate McGarrigle	Heart Like a Wheel	Nonesuch	
2013	Sing Me the Songs: Celebrating the Works of Kate McGarrigle	Proserpina	Nonesuch	
2013	Sing Me the Songs: Celebrating the Works of Kate McGarrigle	I Am a Diamond	Nonesuch	
2013	Sing Me the Songs: Celebrating the Works of Kate McGarrigle	All the Way to San Francisco	Nonesuch	
2013	Sing Me the Songs: Celebrating the Works of Kate McGarrigle	Dink's Song	Nonesuch	
2013	Sing Me the Songs: Celebrating the Works of Kate McGarrigle	Love Over and Over	Nonesuch	
2020	Songs for Australia	"The Ship Song"	BMG	

=== Other guest appearances ===
Year	Artist	Album	Song(s)	Description	Ref.
1983	Kate & Anna McGarrigle	Love Over and Over		Vocals	
1991	various artists	Songs of the Civil War		Vocals	
1995	Loudon Wainwright III	Grown Man	"Father/Daughter Dialogue"	Vocals	
1996	Kate & Anna McGarrigle	Matapédia		Vocals	
1998	Rufus Wainwright	Rufus Wainwright	"April Fools", "In My Arms", "Sally Ann"	Backing vocals	
1998	Kate & Anna McGarrigle	The McGarrigle Hour		Guitar, vocals	
1999	Dan Bern	Smartie Mine	"Baby Love"	Composer	
1999	Boo Hewerdine	Thanksgiving		Vocals	
2000	Red Hot Organization	Red Hot + Indigo	"Star Crossed Lovers"	Vocals (with Propellerheads)	
2001	Jet Set Satellite	Blueprint		Vocals	
2001	Rufus Wainwright	Poses	"Poses", "California", "Rebel Prince", "One Man Guy", "Evil Angel"	Backing vocals	
2002	Linda Thompson	Fashionably Late		Backing vocals	
2002	Gordon Gano	Hitting the Ground	"It's Money"	Vocals	
2003	various artists	Maybe This Christmas Too?	"Spotlight on Christmas"	Backing vocals, bells	
2003	Geoff Muldaur	Private Astronomy: A Vision of the Music of Bix Beiderbecke		Vocals, group member	
2003	Loudon Wainwright III	So Damn Happy		Vocals	
2003	Kate & Anna McGarrigle	La vache qui pleure		Vocals, Spanish guitar	
2003	Rufus Wainwright	Want One		Backing vocals	
2004	Rosalie Sorrels	My Last Go Round		Backing vocals	
2004	Meanwhiles	Nights Rewind		Vocals	
2004	Rufus Wainwright	Want Two	"The One You Love", "Peach Trees", "Hometown Waltz", "Gay Messiah", "Old Whore's Diet"	Violin, backing vocals	
2005	Kate & Anna McGarrigle	The McGarrigle Christmas Hour		Guitar, percussion, vocals, choir, chorus, bells, harmony vocals	
2005	various artists	Peter Buck Presents: The REM Collection, Vol. 3			
2006	Jim Campilongo	Heaven Is Creepy	"Beautiful Dreamer"	Vocals	
2006	Teddy Thompson	Separate Ways		Backing vocals	
2007	Jon Regen	Let It Go		Backing vocals	
2007	Rufus Wainwright	Release the Stars	"Do I Disappoint You", "Slideshow"	Backing vocals	
2007	Rufus Wainwright	Rufus Does Judy at Carnegie Hall	"Stormy Weather"	Lead vocals	
2007	Linda Thompson	Versatile Heart		Harmony vocals	
2008	various artists	Groupes de Pamplemousse	"Il pleure dans mon cœur"	Vocals (with Kate McGarrigle)	
2008	The Heavy Circles	The Heavy Circles	"Easier"	Vocals	
2009	Loudon Wainwright III	High Wide & Handsome: The Charlie Poole Project	"Only Old and in the Way"	Backing vocals	
2010	Hole	Nobody's Daughter	"Nobody's Daughter" and "Pacific Coast Highway "	Backing vocals	
2016	Felix Riebl	Paper Doors	"In Your Arms"	Vocals	
