= J. C. Hopkins =

American band leader

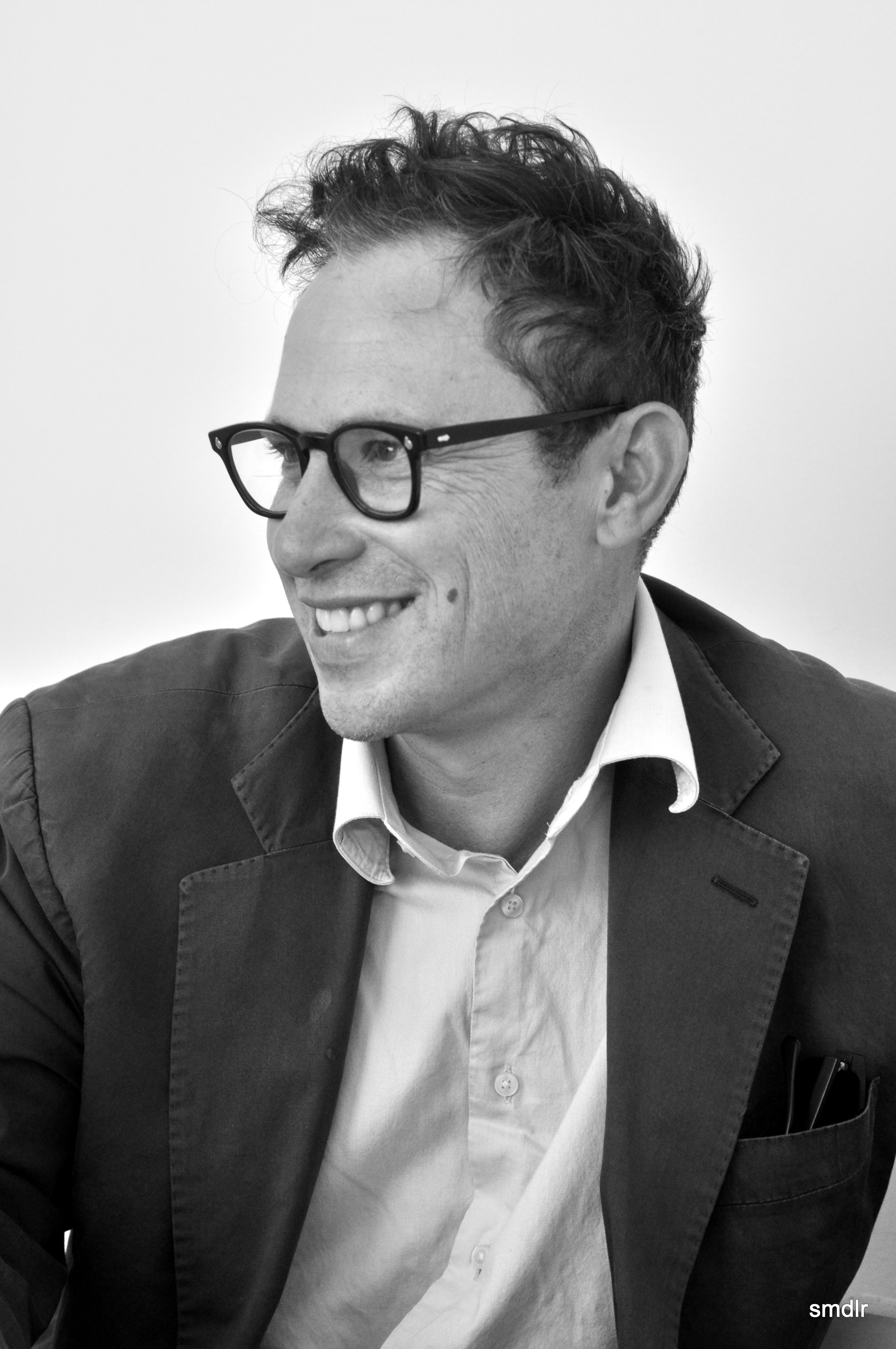
Hopkins in 2018

J.C. Hopkins is an American bandleader, writer, record producer, and Grammy-nominated producer, and songwriter.

== Biography ==
=== California ===
J.C. Hopkins was born and raised in Cypress, California, United States, to a Mexican-American mother, and a father of Russian-Jewish descent. He attended school and played in various bands in his youth. He plays guitar, harmonica, and piano, eventually concentrating on the latter. Upon moving to San Francisco in the late 1980s Hopkins began performing solo as a folk singer. His first band there, Flophouse, began as a folk rock ensemble whose debut self-titled album was produced by Peter Case. The band's second album, Undaunted, garnered favorable reviews including ink in Spin magazine. In 1998 he debuted his first jazz musical, Show Biz'ness, at the Cafe Du Nord in San Francisco.

=== New York City ===
In 2000 Hopkins moved to Brooklyn, New York, to pursue his interest in transitioning from folk to musical theater and jazz, and created a big band by the name of JC Hopkins Biggish Band. Hopkins was introduced to a then fledgling singer Norah Jones through bassist Lee Alexander who played on Victoria Williams' album Water to Drink, which Hopkins co-produced. Jones began singing with the Biggish Band and they performed in venues throughout New York City. A 2008 interview with Judy Carmichael delves into Hopkins' creative relationship with Jones.

Upon Jones signing to Blue Note Records and recording her debut album Come Away with Me on which Hopkins co-wrote "Painter Song" with Lee Alexander, singer Madeleine Peyroux took her place on the bandstand and began writing songs with Hopkins, many of which would later appear on Hopkins' album Underneath a Brooklyn Moon. Peyroux continued to perform with the band along with vocalist Queen Esther, who eventually became the band's mainstay singer.

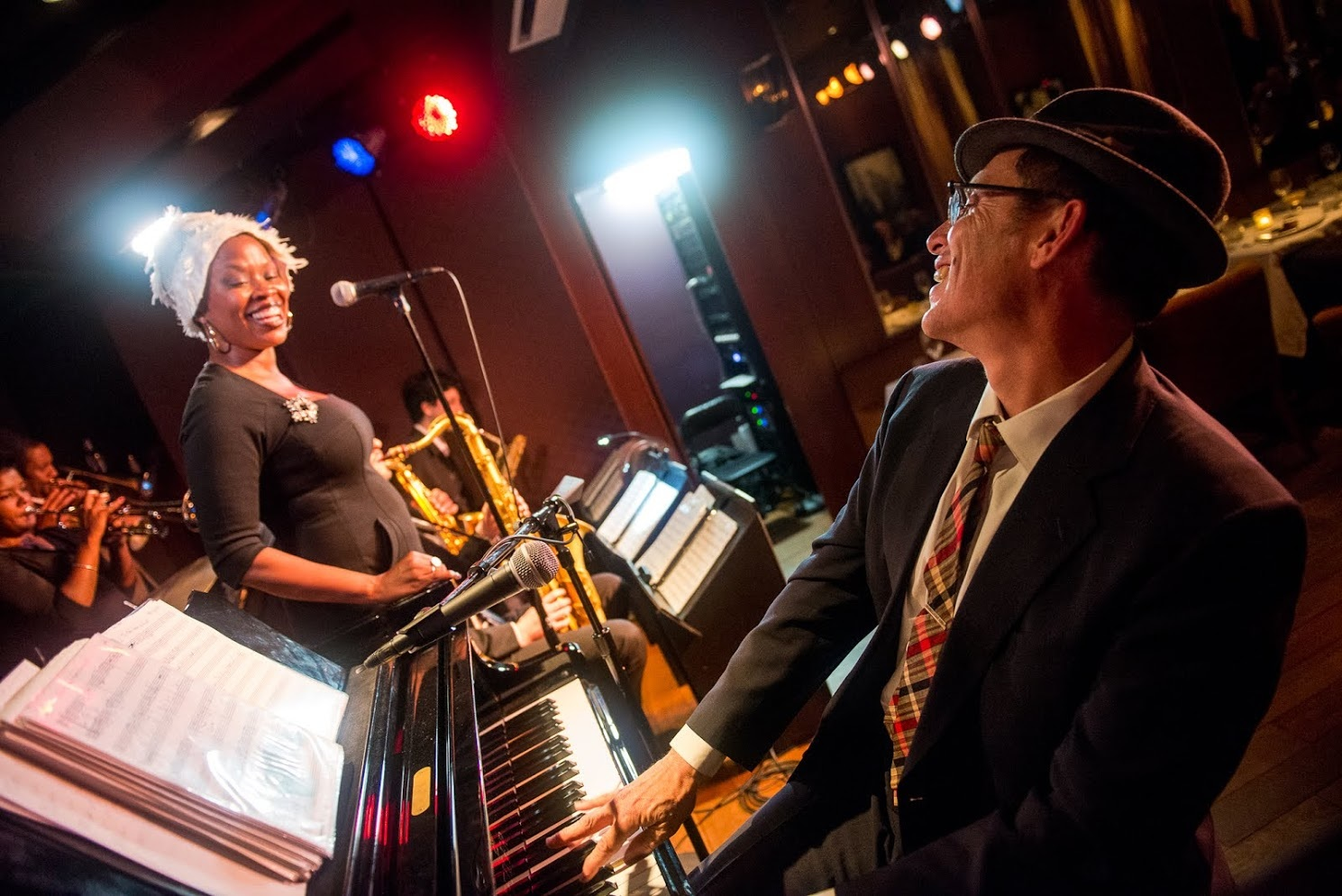
JC Hopkins and Queen Esther

Willie Nelson heard a demo of Norah Jones singing Hopkins' song "Dreams Come True" with the JC Hopkins Biggish Band and decided to record the tune as a duet with Jones. That song appears on Nelson's album It Always Will Be and was nominated for a Grammy in the category of Best Country Collaboration.

=== Underneath a Brooklyn Moon ===
In 2005 Hopkins released the falbum Underneath a Brooklyn Moon, consisting of nine original songs co-written by Norah Jones ("One Never Knows") and Madeleine Peyroux ("Here Comes Love", "I Still Believe In Some Kind Of Love", "I've Got My Finger on a Star", "Settle Down"). The album received positive press on a national scale, including The New Yorker, as well as on National Public Radio.

Actor John Lithgow, upon hearing Hopkins in his NPR interview, inquired with Michael Krumper of Razor & Tie Records who sent Lithgow a copy of Underneath a Brooklyn Moon. Shortly after, Lithgow asked Hopkins to produce his album of Tin Pan Alley children's songs, titled The Sunny Side of the Street. That album was nominated for a Grammy in the category of Best Children's Album.

=== Meet Me at Minton's ===
A 2017 sophomore release, Meet Me at Minton's, was described in All About Jazz as "For those who were not around during the swinging heyday of the Harlem jazz bands, this is as close and real as it gets".

=== New York Moment ===
The third album by the J.C. Hopkins Biggish Band features all original new songs written by Hopkins and co-writes with Melody Federer and trumpeter, vocalist Nico Sarbanes plus a Charles Mingus cover. The album highlighted Joy Hanson, the aforementioned Nico Sarbanes, Vanisha Gould, Shawn Whitehorn and Alicyn Yaffee. Jazz critic Grady Harps wrote of the album, "Tough to beat, this recording is a milestone for jazz".

== It's a Sad and Beautiful World ==
In 2025, Hopkins released It's a Sad and Beautiful World on Twee Jazz Records. The album was mastered by Rob Fraboni and features contributions from Levon Helm, Garth Hudson, Martha Wainwright, and Teddy Thompson. Writing in MOJO, John Aizlewood awarded the album four stars, describing it as a "delightfully eclectic collection" and praising Hopkins's songwriting and the performances of the featured musicians. In a review for Chronogram, Michael Eck described the album as a fresh interpretation of Americana and praised its songwriting, vocals, arrangements, and piano playing.

== Live performances ==
In addition to concerts and events throughout the country, JC Hopkins Biggish Band notably played two tribute shows honoring—and featuring—seminal jazz songwriter Mose Allison. The first, in 2001, was held at Joe's Pub in Manhattan and included Hopkins' longtime friend and collaborator, singer Martha Wainwright, Norah Jones, Madeline Peyroux and Queen Esther. One decade later, in 2011, the band held its second tribute to Allison, again featuring the jazz great, as well as his daughter Amy Allison. The performance featured Elvis Costello performing Allison's songs with the Biggish Band, as well as guest appearances by Orange Is the New Black star Lea DeLaria, folk singer Jolie Holland, Verve recording artist Lucy Woodward, and jazz singer Sasha Dobson.

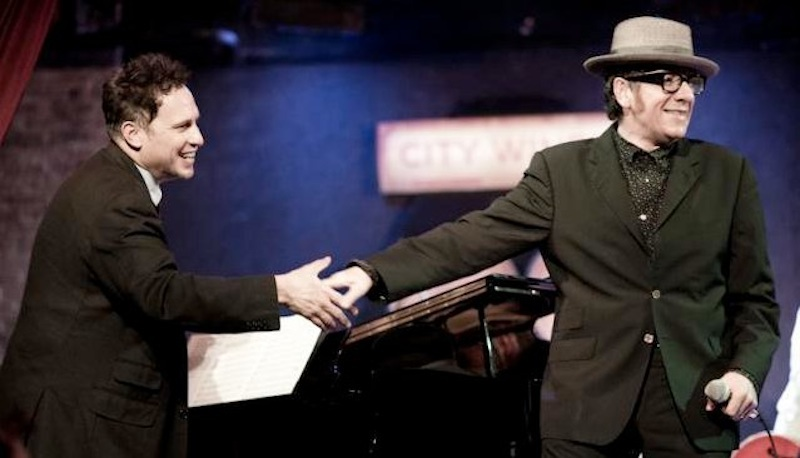
JC Hopkins and Elvis Costello at City Winery, NYC

The Biggish Band has also been featured at Lincoln Center's "Midsummer Night's Swing" and has included songwriter and performance artist Justin Vivian Bond, Joey Arias, Lea DeLaria, as well as jazz pianist and singer Champian Fulton. The band regularly collaborates with various established venues and producers at The Players Club with Justin Bond, Martha Wainwright, Jolie Holland, The Minsky Sisters, and has appeared at the Blue Note Jazz Festival

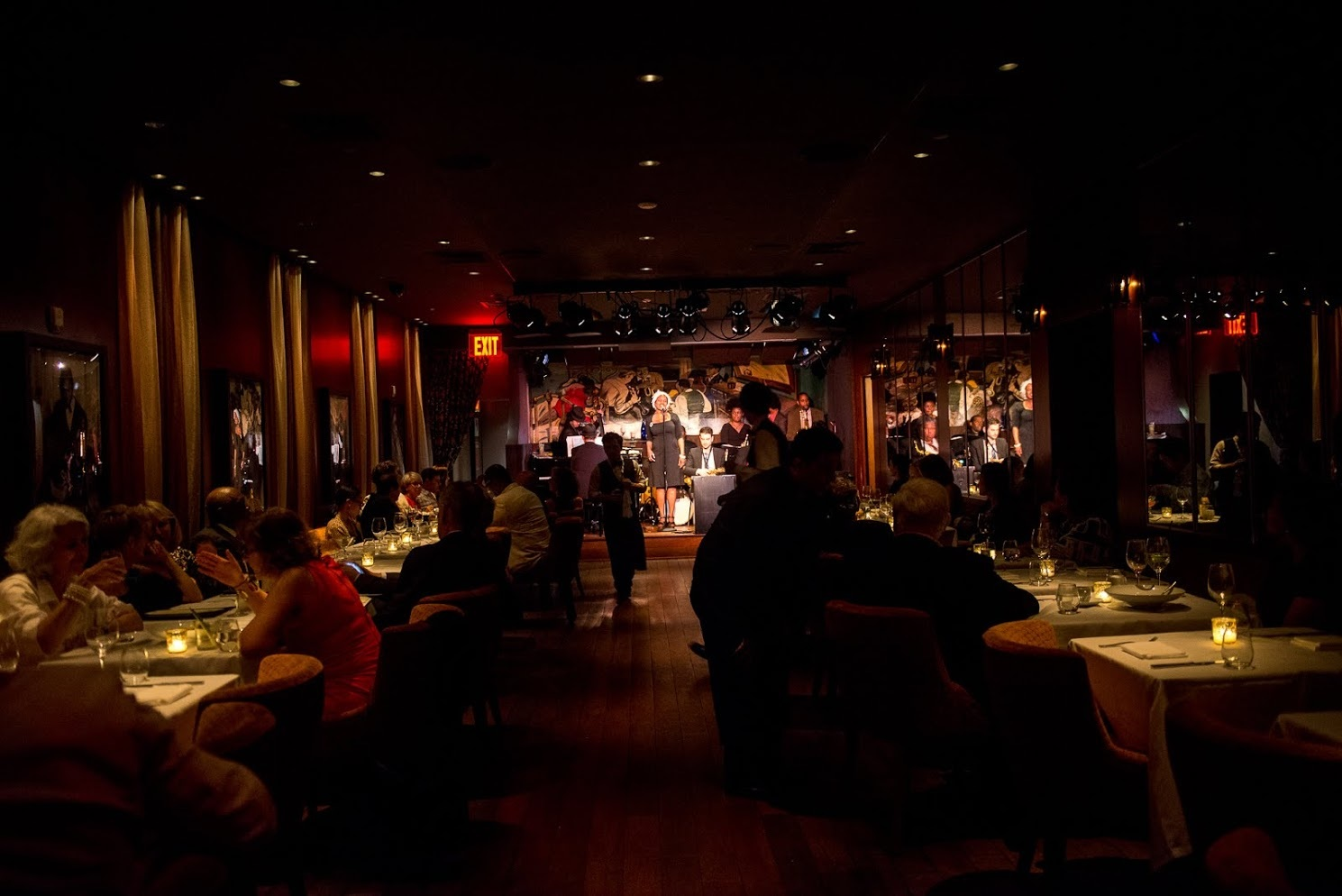
JC Hopkins Biggish Band and Queen Esther at Minton's Harlem

In 2014, vocalist Charles Turner joined the ensemble just as JC Hopkins Biggish Band began its Wednesday night residency the Harlem jazz venue formerly known as Minton's Playhouse (now called "Minton's Harlem").

The Biggish Band was also given the honor of celebrating the 100 year centennial for Frank Sinatra with the 2015 Tribeca Film Festival. Bandleader Hopkins created updated arrangements for classic Sinatra songs crooned by actress and singer Lea DeLaria, artist Ne-Yo, singer Alice Smith, and The Killers frontman Brandon Flowers.

== Minton's Playhouse ==
In addition to his residency at Minton's Harlem, in 2014 Hopkins took over as music programmer, elevating the club's reputation as the genre's birthplace of bebop and is said to be responsible in part for the resurgence of jazz vocalists returning to Harlem clubs, due to his selection of artists performing at Minton's. His latest release, Meet Me At Minton's, is a nod to this moment and features Jazzmeia Horn.

The J.C. Hopkins Biggish Band continues its residency at Minton's with new vocalists Joy Elysse, Nico Sarbanes and Vanisha-Arleen Gould.

== Writing, poetry and photography ==
Hopkins wrote the screenplay for the indie film Poets Are The Destroyers, directed by Nancy Pop. He is the author of the novels "I Was a Teenage Communist", "An Extraordinary Turn of Events", "The Children See Everything" published by Eponymous Books. His books of poetry on Impossible Books: From Far Rockaway to Windsor Terrace, October to October and Summer of Blue Humidity and "NYC Love Story". Noir Nation published his Jazz-Noir novella, The Perfect Fourth, in 2020. JC Hopkins photography appears on Martha Wainwright's Sans Fusils, Ni Souliers, à Paris: Martha Wainwright's Piaf Record and inside the 2012 album Come Home to Mama.

== Affiliated albums ==
=== As producer ===
- Victoria Williams, Water To Drink, Atlantic Records (2000)
- Victoria Williams, Sing Some Old Songs, Dualtone Records (2002)
- John Lithgow, The Sunny Side Of The Street, Razor & Tie Records, (2006)
- Queen Esther, What Is Love, EL Recordings (2010)
- Ben Fields, Extraordinary Light, Sire Records (2014)

=== Songwriting credits ===
- Chuck Prophet, "Balinese Dancer" Balinese Dancer, Homestead Records, (1994)
- Barbara Manning, "Still?", Nowhere, Matador Records, (1995)
- Norah Jones, "Painter Song", Come Away With Me, Blue Note Records, (2002)
- Willie Nelson, "Dreams Come True", It Always Will Be, Lost Highway Records, (2004)
- Ollabelle (with Amy Helm), "Everything Is Broken", Riverside Battle Songs, Verve Records, (2006)
- Ben Fields, "Matilda", Extraordinary Light, Sire Records, (2014)

== Discography ==
=== Flophouse ===
- Flophouse, (Heyday Records, 1990)
- Undaunted, (HARP Records, 1993)
- Upside Down [EP], (Brinkman Records, 1994)
- Tulips and Chimneys, (Brinkman Records, 1995)

=== JC Hopkins ===
- Athens by Night, (Stickshift Records, 1997)
- It's a Sad and Beautiful World, (Twee Jazz Records, 2025)

=== JC Hopkins Biggish Band ===
- Underneath a Brooklyn Moon, (Tigerlily Records, 2005)
- Meet Me at Minton's, (Harlem Jazz Records, 2016)
- New York Moment, (Twee-Jazz Records, 2020)
