= Whither Must I Wander =

"Whither Must I Wander" is a song composed by Ralph Vaughan Williams whose lyrics consist of a poem by Robert Louis Stevenson. The Stevenson poem, entitled Home no more home to me, whither must I wander?, forms part of the collection of poems and songs called Songs of Travel and Other Verses published in 1895, and is originally intended to be sung to the tune of "Wandering Willie" by Robert Burns.

Between 1901 and 1904 Vaughan Williams set nine of Stevenson's poems to music in his song cycle Songs of Travel, in which Whither Must I Wander, arranged in 1902, constitutes song no. 7.

In 2005, Martha Wainwright included the song on her debut album Martha Wainwright.
