= Songs in the Dark =

Songs in the Dark may refer to:

- Songs in the Dark (event), a live music and poetry event based in Farringdon, London
- Songs in the Dark (album), a 2015 album by the Wainwright Sisters
