= Lamkin =

Traditional song

"Lamkin", "Lambkin", "Long Lankin", or "Bolakins" (Roud 6, Child 93) is an English-language ballad. It gives an account of the murder of a woman and her infant son by a man, in some versions, a disgruntled mason, in others, a devil, bogeyman or a motiveless villain. Versions of the ballad are found in Scotland, England and the US.

According to Roud and Bishop (2012):

"Lambkin" is not one of the major league Child ballads in terms of popularity, but it was widely known in England and Scotland, and even more so in North America. ... The central character's name varies considerably, including, in just the English versions 'Lambkin', 'Lamkin', 'Lincoln', and 'Limkin', and he is various referred to as 'Long', 'Bold', 'Cruel' and 'False'.

They cite the analysis of Anne Gilchrist, who identified two threads: one Scottish, which retained the mason narrative; one Northumbrian, which lost the mason in early versions, thus encouraging singers to supply a different back-story. Versions collected in England stem from the Northumbrian thread.

== A bogeyman ==
Other versions follow the same basic story, but the antagonist has many different names, among them "Long Lonkin", "Balankin", "Lambert Linkin", "Rankin", "Long Lankyn", and "Lammikin". Later versions lose the opening of the story, which explains that Lamkin is a mason who has not been paid; in these, Lamkin becomes a sort of a bogeyman who dwells in the wild places; the lord, before leaving, warns against him:

Says milord to milady as he mounted his horse,
"Beware of Long Lankin that lives in the moss."
Says milord to milady as he went on his way,
"Beware of Long Lankin that lives in the hay."

These versions add peculiar incidents that add to the grisliness of the crime. Lamkin and the nursemaid collect the baby's blood in a basin. The name Lamkin or Lammikin indicates the murderer was pale skinned and, therefore, perhaps a leper who sought to cure himself by bathing in the blood of an innocent collected in a silver bowl, a medieval cure.

== Performances ==
- A version titled "Bolakins" was recorded as sung by Mrs. Lena Bare Turbyfill in 1939, Library of Congress
- The song has been recorded as "Long Lankin" on But Two Came By (1968) by Martin Carthy.
- The song "Bo Lamkin" was recorded by Appalachian folk musician Frank Proffitt.
- Oli Steadman included it on his song collection "365 Days Of Folk".
- In 1971, song collector Tom Munnelly recorded Irish Traveller and folk singer John Reilly singing it as "False Lankum". This version was later the inspiration for the name of Irish folk band Lankum.
- In 1973 Northumbrian folk group The High Level Ranters recorded it as "Long Lonkin" on their album A Mile To Ride.
- Steeleye Span recorded it as "Long Lankin" on Commoners Crown (1975).
- Dave Burland recorded "Lamkin" on his album You Can't Fool The Fat Man (1979) with Nic Jones.
- The Neofolk band Fire + Ice recorded "Long Lankin" on their album Gilded By The Sun (1992).
- Tinkerscuss perform and recorded a version as Long Lankin on their album Stonedancing
- Jim Moray recorded a version as "Long Lankin" on his album In Modern History (2010).
- A version was recorded by English traditional singer Ben Butcher as "Cruel Lincoln" in 1955 and issued on The Voice of the People Vol, 3 in 1988.
- The song "Lambkin" is included on the studio album Smoke of Home, the second album by the band Megson, released in 2007.
- The Wainwright Sisters also included a recording of Long Lankin on their 2015 album Songs in the Dark.
- Blackbeard's Tea Party's 2013 album Whip Jamboree features a version of the ballad.
- For her 2016 album Lodestar, English folk singer Shirley Collins recorded a version of "Cruel Lincoln," which draws from the Ben Butcher version.
- Classical composer and librettist Fleur de Bray set the story of Long Lankin as an opera, which was premiered in August 2013 at the acclaimed London Tête à Tête Opera Festival.
- The 2018 Adult Swim series The Shivering Truth features variations of the ballad (titled "Long Lankin" in this case) sung by different artists over the end credits of every episode.
- Martin Simpson released a version of this ballad entitled "Beaulampkin" on compilation of Fernie Court Management Ltd.
- Seventeen field-recordings of the ballad, spanning 1934–2021, were curated by Derek Piotr and released by Death is Not the End, in 2022.

== In literature ==
The ballad, as Long Lonkin, was taken from a friend by Letitia Elizabeth Landon and published in her Fisher's Drawing Room Scrap Book, 1835.

The song was referenced in the title of the short story collection, Long Lankin, by John Banville. The American poet Robert Lowell also referenced the song in the title of his Pulitzer Prize-winning collection of poetry Lord Weary's Castle (1946). The song inspired the young-adult novel Long Lankin (2011) by Lindsey Barraclough.

A sadistic character named Lankin appears as a member of the Fairy Queen's court in Terry Pratchett's Lords and Ladies.

Long Lankin appears in Jane Yolen and Midori Snyder's book Except The Queen.
