= Songs in the Dark (album) =

Studio album by The Wainwright Sisters
- Released: November 13, 2015
- Genres: Folk; pop rock; rock
- Length: 49:13
- Label: PIAS

Martha Wainwright chronology
Come Home to Mama (2012)	Songs in the Dark (2015)

Lucy Wainwright Roche chronology
There's a Last Time for Everything (2013)	Songs in the Dark (2015)

Songs in the Dark is the debut album by the Wainwright Sisters, a singer-songwriter duo featuring the Canadian-American Martha Wainwright and her American half-sister Lucy Wainwright Roche. The album, released on November 13, 2015, includes lullabies that their mothers Kate McGarrigle and Suzzy Roche sang to them as children, plus songs by Woody Guthrie, Jimmie Rogers, and their father Loudon Wainwright III.

Family members credited on the album include Lily and Sylvan Lanken and Anna McGarrigle on vocals, and Jane McGarrigle on piano. Other contributors include Brad Albetta on bass, keyboards, and organ, Thomas Bartlett on piano, Tom Mennier for bell arrangements, Éloi Painchaud on banjo and harmonica, and Joel Zifkin on violin. Albetta and Sylvan Lanken are also credited as audio engineers; the former received additional credits for mixing.

The Wainwright Sisters promoted the album with a series of three performances in New York City, London, and Montreal.

== Composition ==
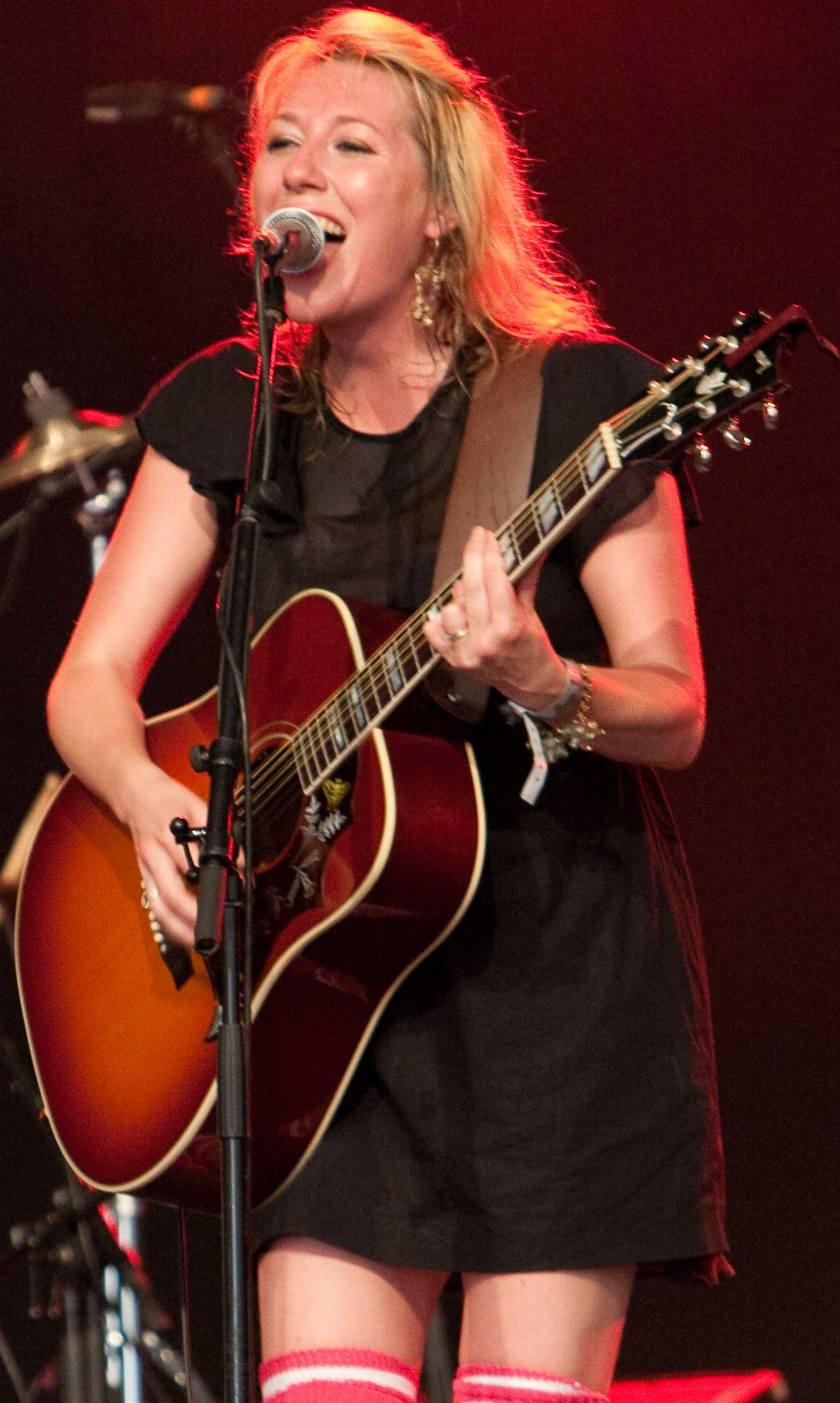
Martha Wainwright in 2008

The Wainwright Sisters' Songs in the Dark was released by PIAS in November 2015. Their debut collaborative album features sixteen tracks that have been described as "dark, mysterious, and beautiful" interpretations of songs sung to them as children. Included are songs by their mothers Kate McGarrigle and Suzzy Roche, respectively, and their shared father Loudon Wainwright III. Credited family members include Lily and Sylvan Lanken and Anna McGarrigle on vocals, and Jane McGarrigle on piano. Other contributors to the album include Brad Albetta on bass, keyboards, and organ, Thomas Bartlett on piano, Tom Mennier for bell arrangements, Éloi Painchaud on banjo and harmonica, and Joel Zifkin on violin. Albetta and Sylvan Lanken are also credited as audio engineers; the former received additional credits for mixing. Kathleen Weldon created the album's cover art.

The album opens with "Prairie Lullaby" (William Hill, Jimmie Rodgers) and is followed by Goebel Reeves's "Hobo's Lullaby". "El Condor Pasa" (English: The Condor Passes), originally a musical composition from the Peruvian Daniel Alomía Robles's 1913 zarzuela of the same name, was popularized by the American folk rock duo Simon & Garfunkel, who recorded it on their 1970 album Bridge over Troubled Water under the title "El Condor Pasa (If I Could)". The 1970 version is credited to Jorge Milchberg, Alomía Robles, and Paul Simon. Roche recalled how "daunting" it was to learn the song as a teenage guitarist: "My aunt Terre taught it to me and I remember the overwhelming and seemingly impossible task of switching to a C chord in the chorus as a new player." The song begins with Wainwright performing in an "earthy" lower register and is followed by Roche's higher harmonies. Wainwright said of the song's inclusion on the album, "I'm so glad Lucy thought of this song. It's such a beautiful melody and ties in so well with the mystery of the record."

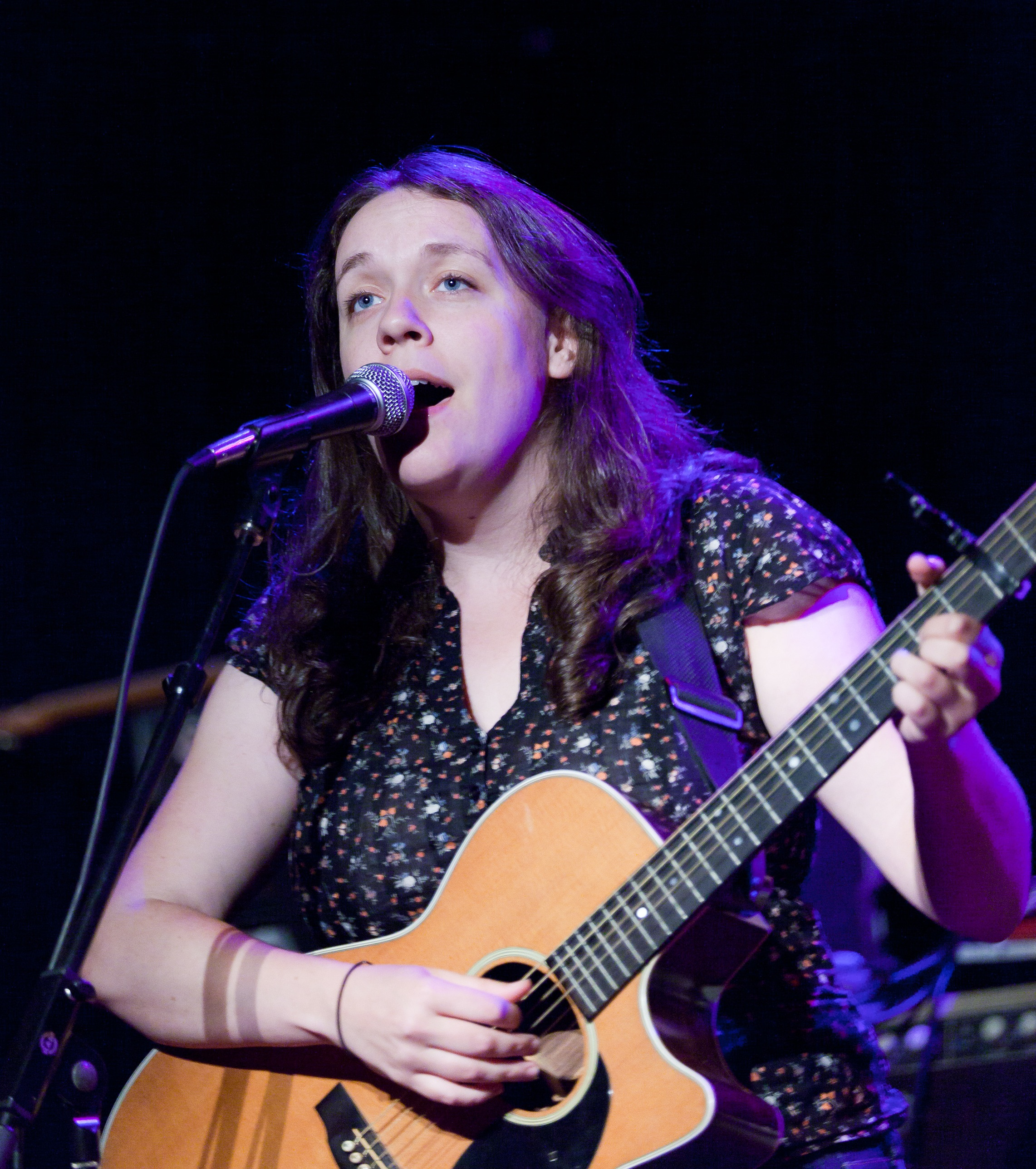
Lucy Wainwright Roche in 2010

The next two songs, "Lullaby" and "Lullaby for a Doll", were written by Wainwright III and Kate McGarrigle (mother of Martha Wainwright), respectively. McGarrigle (1946–2010) was a Canadian singer-songwriter who wrote and performed with her sister Anna as the duo Kate and Anna McGarrigle. "Runs in the Family" and "Baby Rocking Medley" were written by Terre Roche and Rosalie Sorrels, respectively. "Screaming Issue" was co-written by Wainwright III and Terre Roche (about Lucy Wainwright Roche herself), and originally appeared on the former's 1985 studio album I'm Alright. "Long Lankin" is the first of three traditional songs on the album. The a cappella rendition features vocals by the duo's cousins Lily and Sylvan Lanken. "Our Mother the Mountain" originally appeared as the title track on Townes Van Zandt's second studio album, released in 1969. Roche and Wainwright perform the song at a slightly faster tempo.

"End of the Rainbow" and "Dusty Skies" are credited to Richard Thompson and Cindy Walker, respectively. The former originally appeared on Thompson's 1974 album, I Want to See the Bright Lights Tonight. Songs' second traditional song, "All the Pretty Horses", is followed by Irving Berlin's "Russian Lullaby". "Do You Love an Apple" is credited Kevin Burke, Tríona Ní Dhomhnaill, Mícheál Ó Domhnaill, Paddy Keenan, Dónal Lunny, and Matt Molloy. The album closes with a third traditional song, "Go Tell Aunt Rhody".

== Promotion ==
Before the album's confirmation, Roche opened for her brother Rufus Wainwright and included in her set list a song from an album of "dark lullabies" that she and her sister were working on. Details of the album were announced in September 2015. The song "El Condor Pasa" premiered on Speakeasy, a blog affiliated with The Wall Street Journal, via SoundCloud, on October 7, 2015. CBC Music began streaming the album in its entirety on November 6, 2015.

The Wainwright Sisters promoted the album with a series of three performances at City Winery in New York City on November 7, St Stephen's Church as part of the London Folk and Roots Festival on November 10, and the Phi Centre in Montreal on December 1.

== Reception ==
Professional ratings
Review scores
Source	Rating
The Herald	8/10 stars
The Independent	4/5 stars

CBC Music's Melody Lau opined, "Wainwright and Roche display a familiarity and ease around each track, delivering each refrain with a palpable sentiment". Furthermore, she wrote, "Songs in the Dark is a nostalgic exercise for Wainwright and Roche, to reconnect to the songs of their childhood and possibly re-imagine them for their children. For the listener, it's an intriguing look into the music that existed in the Wainwright household, the sounds that shaped and informed one of music's most talented families." Jude Rogers of The Guardian called the album a "lovely, twilit thing" and the duo's London performance "powerful because the sisters' different voices create a strange magic together. Martha's is girlish but also fleshy and sinewy, while Lucy's rings out like a bright, clear bell. The combination gives songs ... an uncanny, eerie edge, and a sound far removed from the glossy polish of sibling bands such as the Staves." Rogers noted a few errors during the concert, but wrote, "When the siblings sing together, though, everything else is forgotten."

The Herald's Kim Mayo said the album's covers are performed "to winning effect, with the siblings' voices in perfect harmony". Mayo scored Songs eight out of ten and called "El Condor Pasa" the album's most successful track. She said "Opener Prairie Lullaby" was "equally lovely" and the songs "Runs in the Family", "All the Pretty Little Horses", and "End of the Rainbow" were a "rare treat". Andy Gill of The Independent gave the album four out of five stars and quipped, "If ever an album merited the epithet 'charming', this is it." He called the duo's harmonies "spellbinding" in general, and specifically noted their "spookily intimate" voices on "Prairie Lullaby". Gill also complimented Lily and Sylvan Lanken's contributions to "Long Lankin". The Wall Street Journal's Eric Danton said the sisters' voices, specifically on "El Condor Pasa", "[interlock] so tightly it feels instinctual".

== Track listing ==
No.	Title	Writer(s)	Length
1.	"Prairie Lullaby"	William Hill; Jimmie Rodgers	3:27
2.	"Hobo's Lullaby"	Goebel Reeves	2:51
3.	"El Condor Pasa"	Jorge Milchberg; Daniel Alomía Robles; Paul Simon	3:52
4.	"Lullaby"	Loudon Wainwright III	2:25
5.	"Lullaby for a Doll"	Kate McGarrigle	4:04
6.	"Runs in the Family"	Terre Roche	3:04
7.	"Baby Rocking Medley"	Rosalie Sorrels	4:03
8.	"Screaming Issue"	Loudon Wainwright III; Terre Roche	4:43
9.	"Long Lankin"	Traditional	3:09
10.	"Our Mother the Mountain"	Townes Van Zandt	3:25
11.	"End of the Rainbow"	Richard Thompson	3:38
12.	"Dusty Skies"	Cindy Walker	2:48
13.	"All the Pretty Horses"	Traditional	1:55
14.	"Russian Lullaby"	Irving Berlin	1:34
15.	"Do You Love an Apple"	Kevin Burke; Tríona Ní Dhomhnaill; Mícheál Ó Domhnaill; Paddy Keenan; Dónal Lunny; Matt Molloy	2:18
16.	"Go Tell Aunt Rhody"	Traditional	1:57
Total length:			49:13

Track listing adapted from AllMusic, iTunes and MapleMusic Recordings.

== Personnel ==
- Brad Albetta – bass, engineer, keyboards, mixing, organ
- Thomas Bartlett – piano
- Lily Lanken – vocals
- Sylvan Lanken – engineer, vocals
- Anna McGarrigle – vocals
- Jane McGarrigle – piano
- Tom Mennier – bell arrangements
- Éloi Painchaud – banjo, harmonica
- Lucy Wainwright Roche – guitar, vocals
- Martha Wainwright – guitar, vocals
- Kathleen Weldon – cover art
- Joel Zifkin – violin

Credits adapted from AllMusic.

== Charts ==
Chart performance for Songs in the Dark
Chart (2015)	Peak position
UK Americana Albums (Official Charts)	7
UK Independent Albums (Official Charts)	19
