= Bloody Mother Fucking Asshole =

EP by Martha Wainwright
- Released: January 2005
- Recorded: 2004–2005
- Genre: Folk, pop
- Length: 17:23
- Label: Zoë
- Producer: Martha Wainwright, Brad Albetta

Bloody Mother Fucking Asshole is a five track EP by Martha Wainwright. It was released in January 2005 through both Zoë Records and Drowned in Sound.

== Background ==
Bloody Mother Fucking Asshole was inspired by Wainwright's father, Loudon Wainwright III. She wrote the track as a response to her father's way of writing songs about his family, rather than tending to them.

The EP was released in the UK as a 4 song EP (When The Day Is Short omitted) on the Drowned in Sound label.

"Bloody Mother Fucking Asshole" was used at the end of the second episode in season three of the Netflix original series Orange is the New Black, and at the end of the fourth episode in season one of the HBO original series Big Little Lies.

== Critical reception ==
Professional ratings
Review scores
| Source | Rating |
|---|---|
| AllMusic | 3.5/5 stars |
| PopMatters | 6/10 stars |
| Robert Christgau | (choice cut) |

The review in PopMatters calls the EP "a rebellious introductory stance for an artist looking to provoke or silence potential critics" and states that Wainwright is "as different from her brother as her brother is different from their father, but like both men, she's fiercely honest and stubbornly candid". AllMusic write that "Wainwright's husky voice has matured into a thing of real beauty, and her ability to sound both majestic and totally wrecked helps to humanize each track".

== Track listing ==
1. "Bloody Mother Fucking Asshole" (Wainwright) – 3:12
2. "I Will Internalize" (Wainwright) – 3:25
3. "When the Day Is Short" (Wainwright) – 3:14
4. "It's Over" (Wainwright) – 3:28
5. "How Soon'" (Carroll Lucas, Jack Owens) – 4:04

== Covers ==
The title song "Bloody Mother Fucking Asshole" has been translated into a Swedish version by Caroline af Ugglas. The song, in Swedish called "Vill inte spela glad" ("Don't Want to Act Happy"), can be found on her album Så gör jag det igen, released March 18, 2009.

== Personnel ==
- Martha Wainwright – vocals, guitar, additional vocals (track 4) and producer
- Brad Albetta – bass (tracks 1 and 2), keyboard (track 1), organ (track 2), producer
- Cameron Grider – electric guitar (track 3)
- Paul Bryan – bass (track 3), Mellotrons (track 3)
- Bill Dobrow – drums (track 3)
- Lily Lanken – additional vocals (tracks 3 and 5)
- Tom Mennier – piano (track 5), Rhodes (track 5)
