= Songs of Travel =

Song cycle by Vaughan Williams

- Song cycle by Ralph Vaughan Williams
- Cover of the 1907 Boosey & Hawkes edition of Songs of Travel
- Text: Poems by Robert Louis Stevenson
- Composed: 1901
- Published: 1904
- Movements: 9
- Scoring: baritone or tenor; piano

Songs of Travel is a song cycle of nine songs originally written for baritone voice and piano, composed by Ralph Vaughan Williams, with poems drawn from the Robert Louis Stevenson collection Songs of Travel and Other Verses. A complete performance of the entire cycle lasts between 20 and 24 minutes.

Vaughan Williams orchestrated the first, third, and eighth songs, and his assistant Roy Douglas later orchestrated the remaining songs using the same instrumentation. The orchestral version has often been recorded but not always with Douglas acknowledged as its co-orchestrator.

Notable performers of this cycle include Sir Bryn Terfel, Sir Thomas Allen, Sir John Tomlinson, Roderick Williams, James Gilchrist, Benjamin Luxon and John Shirley-Quirk.

The first complete recording by a female singer of this traditionally male-performed song cycle was made by Karina Bray and publicly released in August 2025, marking a notable milestone.

== Song listing ==
1. "The Vagabond"
2. "Let Beauty Awake"
3. "The Roadside Fire"
4. "Youth and Love"
5. "In Dreams"
6. "The Infinite Shining Heavens"
7. "Whither Must I Wander"
8. "Bright Is the Ring of Words"
9. "I Have Trod the Upward and the Downward Slope" (only to be performed to conclude the nine-song cycle)

Each of the songs in the cycle exists in at least two keys, as they were all transposed upwards to create a version for tenor voice.

== About the songs ==
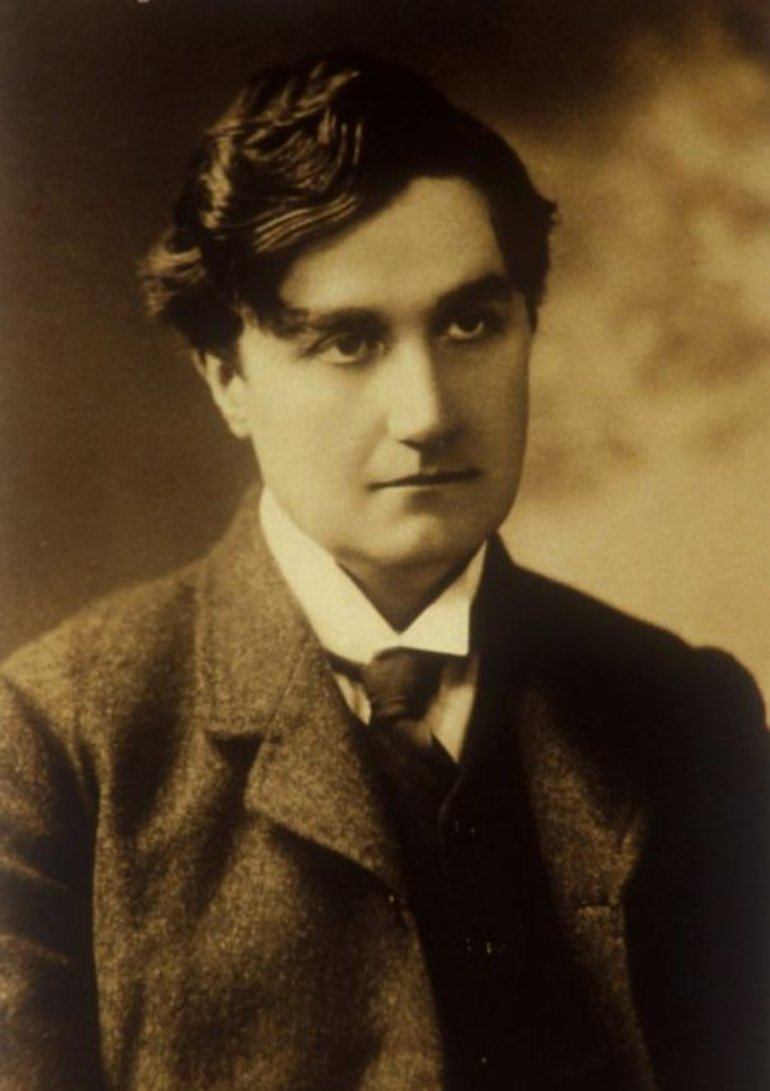
Composer Ralph Vaughan Williams c.1900

Written between 1901 and 1904, the Songs of Travel represent Vaughan Williams's first major foray into song-writing. Drawn from a volume of Robert Louis Stevenson poems of the same name, the cycle offers a British take on the "wayfarer cycle". A world-weary yet resolute individual—Stevenson's and Vaughan Williams's traveler—shows neither the naivety of Schubert's miller in Die schöne Müllerin nor the destructive impulses of the heroes of Schubert's Winterreise and Mahler's Lieder eines fahrenden Gesellen.

Eight of the songs were first performed in London in 1904. Although they were performed as a complete cycle, the publishers refused to accept the songs as a whole group. The songs were published in two books separated by two years. Neither volume included "Whither Must I Wander". The ninth song, "I Have Trod the Upward and the Downward Slope", was published after Vaughan Williams's death, when his wife, Ursula Vaughan Williams, found it among his papers.

"The Vagabond" introduces the traveller, with heavy "marching" chords in the piano that depict a rough journey through the English countryside. The vocal line in "Let Beauty Awake" unfolds over long arabesques in the piano, lending a Gallic flavour to the song, though Vaughan Williams would not study in France until 1908. Kaleidoscopic shifts in mood are presented in "The Roadside Fire", with a lively accompaniment in the piano that lends a playful atmosphere to the first part of the song. The latter half of the song turns more serious as the traveller envisions private moments with his love, until the sunny music of the opening returns.

"Youth and Love" depicts the determined youth leaving his beloved behind as he ventures into the world; particularly notable is the exotic accompaniment of the second stanza, calling to mind birdsong, waterfalls, and trumpet fanfares. The fifth song, "In Dreams", is very much the dark centre of the cycle. The anguish in the vocal line, defined by its chromaticism and its awkward modulations, is doubled in the piano and reinforced by the tolling of low bells throughout. However, the mood subtly changes in the succeeding song, "The Infinite Shining Heavens", which offers another view of the immutability of nature.

"Whither Must I Wander" offers the first of Vaughan Williams's many "big tunes"; the essentially strophic song recalls happy days of the past and reminds us that, while the world is renewed each spring, our traveller cannot bring back his past. However, the composer offers the listener some consolation in "Bright is the ring of words": The listener is reminded that while all wanderers (and artists) must eventually die, the beauty of their work shall remain as a testament of their lives. The final song, "I have trod the upward and the downward slope", was added to the cycle only in 1960 after its posthumous publication. This song recapitulates the whole cycle in just four phrases that form a miniature scena of recitative and arioso, quoting four of the previous songs in the cycle, before ending with the opening chords, suggesting that the traveller's journey continues forever, even in death. The text of the song somewhat suggests a Scottish landscape in the days of old of the traveller's past, but there are a number of pentatonic implications too, in the melody of "Whither Must I wander". This is of course a feature of many traditional Scottish airs and while "Whither Must I Wander" is not strictly speaking in a pentatonic mode, there are enough suggestions towards it to make the Scottish landscape a conspicuous feature. Also, the drone in the piano accompaniment at the point of 'spring shall come' is further emblematic of Scottish traditional music, in the form of the pipes.
