= Songs in the Dark (event) =

Live music and poetry event in London, England

Songs in the Dark is a live music and poetry event based in Farringdon, London, England. It was started in 2003 by Richard Dark, Simon Mastrantone and Jeremy Warmsley. It is also a record label and released the first critically lauded EP by The Woe Betides as well as their debut album Never Sleep.

Songs in the Dark began putting on nights every other Sunday at Clowns Cafe in Cambridge in 2003. In 2005 it moved to London where it puts on nights at the Betsey Trotwood in Farringdon. While originally a bi-monthly event, it gradually scaled down to only a few select shows a year. Its spectral cousin continues to haunt Cambridge.

== Notable appearances ==
As well as resident artists like Niall Spooner-Harvey, Adam Terry, Simon Mastrantone, Jeremy Warmsley and The Woe Betides, the early London shows featured many artists that were considered part of the Hoxton anti-folk scene. Artists like Jamie T, Emmy the Great, Jack Peñate and Little Death all performed at early shows. Later editions would include Leona Naess (daughter of Diana Ross, who was in attendance that evening), Kelli Ali of the Sneaker Pimps and Yo Zushi.

Earlier Cambridge editions featured early performances from Hamfatter and Bomb Factory.
