= Lucy (Lucy Wainwright Roche album) =

Studio album by Lucy Wainwright Roche
- Released: October 26, 2010
- Studio: Water Music, Hoboken, New Jersey
- Genre: Folk
- Label: Strike Back
- Producer: Stewart Lerman, Lucy Wainwright Roche

Lucy Wainwright Roche chronology
Lucy (2010)	There's a Last Time for Everything (2013)

Lucy is the debut studio album by American folk musician Lucy Wainwright Roche, released on October 26, 2010 on Strike Back Records. Produced by Stewart Lerman, the album features appearances from Roche's father Loudon Wainwright III, The Roches, Steuart Smith, David Mansfield and Kelly Hogan.

== Track listing ==
All tracks written by Lucy Wainwright Roche, except where noted.

1. "Once In"
2. "Open Season"
3. "Early Train"
4. "The Worst Part"
5. "October"
6. "Statesville"
7. "I-35"
8. "Accident & Emergency"
9. "Mercury News"
10. "Starting Square"
11. "America" (Paul Simon)

Bonus track

1. "Say Yes" (Elliott Smith)
