= Lucy Wainwright Roche =

American musician (born 1981)

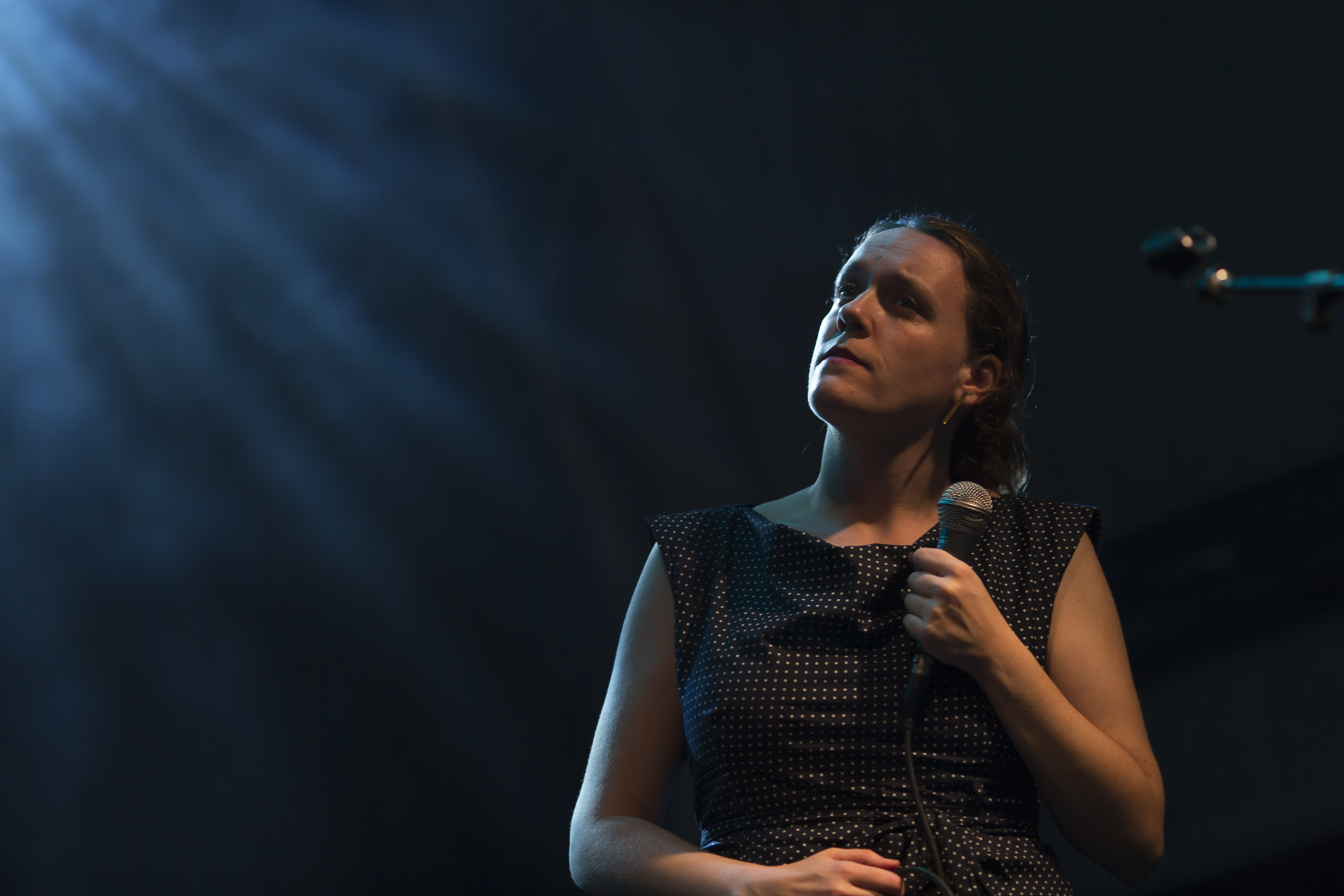
- Wainwright Roche in 2015

Background information
- Born: December 16, 1981 (age 44); New York City, U.S.
- Genres: Folk
- Occupation: Singer-songwriter
- Instruments: Vocals, guitar
- Years active: 2007–present
- Member of: The Wainwright Sisters
- Website: lucywainwrightroche.com

Lucy Wainwright Roche (born December 16, 1981) is an American singer-songwriter. Preceded by two EPs, 8 Songs and 8 More, Roche released her debut album, Lucy in October 2010. In 2013, she starred as Jeri in the Stuff You Should Know television show.

== Musical family ==
Lucy Wainwright Roche is the daughter of singer-songwriters Loudon Wainwright III, a Grammy Award winner, and Suzzy Roche, who, along with her sisters Maggie and Terre Roche (Lucy's aunts), made up the vocal group the Roches, known for their original harmonies. The couple split when Lucy was two years old and her father spent much of his time in the UK, so Lucy did not often see her father during her childhood. The Loudon Wainwright song "Screaming Issue" is written about Lucy. Lucy and Suzzy sometimes appear onstage together, occasionally with Loudon.

Lucy is also the half-sister of singer-songwriters Rufus Wainwright and Martha Wainwright (whose mother Kate was half of the Canadian folk duo Kate & Anna McGarrigle). She has toured with Rufus throughout the years. Through her father, she is a niece of singer-songwriter Sloan Wainwright.

== Background ==
Roche was born and raised in Greenwich Village, New York City. She attended PS 41 in Manhattan and high school at Saint Ann's School in Brooklyn, New York, graduating in 1999. She then attended Oberlin College in Ohio, graduating in 2003 with a degree in creative writing. In 2006 Roche received her master's degree in general education from Bank Street College of Education in Manhattan.

== Career ==
Roche initially chose to bypass the family career choice of music to teach elementary school in Durham, North Carolina, and New York City for several years. In 2007, she made the decision to pursue a career in music full-time. This decision is chronicled in her "Spring Song" which appears on her EP 8 More, released in 2008. Prior to 8 More, Roche released her first EP in 2007 titled 8 Songs which featured "Saddest Sound", a song that appeared on the television show Lipstick Jungle.

Lucy has toured as an opening act for the Indigo Girls, and the duo is featured on two songs on Lucy's self-titled record released in October 2010. She has also opened for such acts as Dar Williams, Girlyman, Amos Lee, her father Loudon Wainwright, and her half-brother Rufus Wainwright. Lucy sang backup for Grammy-nominated artist Neko Case, including an appearance with Case on the Late Show with David Letterman.

In early 2009, Lucy's song "Snare Drum" won the 8th Annual Independent Music Awards for Best Folk/Singer-Songwriter Song.

In 2008, she was one of the winners of the Falcon Ridge Folk Festival's "Emerging Artist" competition. Again in 2009, she was one of six winners of the Grassy Hill Kerrville Folk Festival's "New Folk Singer/Songwriter Competition".

Roche released her debut album, Lucy, in October 2010. Two of her songs, "Once In" and "Starting Square" are featured on the soundtrack of the 2013 movie The Last Keepers.

In 2015, Roche opened for her brother, Rufus, on his Australia tour, where he premiered a song about her, "Lucy's Blue." On the tour, Roche shared a song from an album of "dark lullabies" on which she and her sister were working.

== Discography ==
=== Studio albums ===
- Lucy (2010)
- There's a Last Time for Everything (2013)
- Fairytale and Myth (2013) with Suzzy Roche
- Songs in the Dark (2015), as The Wainwright Sisters
- Mud & Apples (2016) with Suzzy Roche
- Little Beast (2018)
- I Can Still Hear You (2020) with Suzzy Roche

=== EPs ===
- 8 Songs (2007)
- 8 More (2008)
- Live at Lime with Lucy Wainwright Roche (2008, digital download)
