= Queen Esther (artist) =

American actor, musician, and songwriter

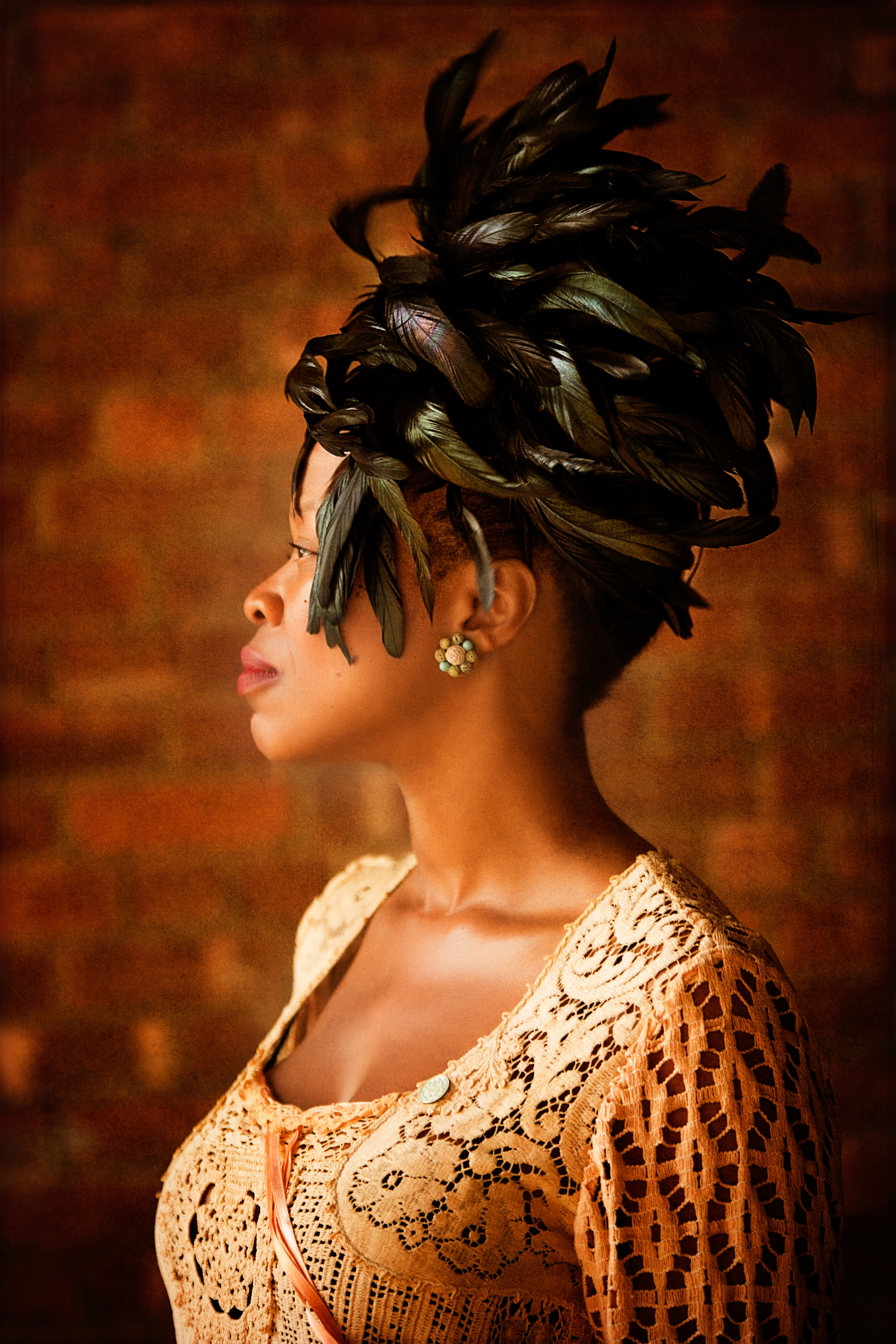
- Queen Esther, Jazz Age Lawn Party on Governor's Island, August 2014

Background information
- Born: Atlanta, Georgia
- Genres: Jazz, blues, pop
- Occupation: Musician
- Years active: 1994–present
- Label: El Recordings
- Website: queen-esther.com

Queen Esther is an American actor, playwright, musician, producer, and songwriter.

== Early life ==
Queen Esther was raised in Atlanta, Georgia and Charleston, South Carolina. She grew up in the Church of God in Christ (C.O.G.I.C.), soloing as a vocalist in the choir at an early age. Both of her parents are from South Carolina's Lowcountry and were a part of The Great Migration as well as the New Great Migration, settling the family in Atlanta, Georgia in the 1970s. Queen Esther's mother taught her how to read before the age of five. She was identified as gifted and talented in kindergarten, receiving acceleration in English and creative writing as a part of gifted education while in grade school.

While attending Northside High School in Atlanta, a magnet school for the performing arts (now North Atlanta High School), she studied opera, classical music and music theory, developed an appreciation of jazz, was featured in productions in the city including Leonard Bernstein's MASS with the Atlanta Symphony Orchestra, sang in city and state chorales, attended the Georgia Governor’s Honors Program in Drama, and competed for and won several scholarships in theater through Arts Recognition and Talent Search (now YoungArts), sponsored by the National Foundation for Advancement in the Arts and attended the University of Texas at Austin.

Of her influences musically, Queen Esther said, "I can’t ever remember not hearing that twang, that dissonance. It was in the air. That blue-ing of the note, that was a way of life. That’s as true for me as it is for any other Southerner. It’s not the kind of thing you think about. It just is."

While an undergraduate in Austin, Queen Esther performed frequently on the local cabaret and theater scene in productions directed by Boyd Vance. She was the lead vocalist for the funk band Moving Parts, sharing the stage with guitarist Larry Carlton, the Neville Brothers and Crowded House. She was one of three vocalists in Ro-Tel and the Hot Tomatoes, a regional favorite specializing in theatrically showcasing girl group music from the 1950s and 1960s. They performed events and private parties for Texas luminaries Wendy Russell Reves, Robert Bass and his brothers, and H. Ross Perot and played festivals and regional showcases with The Temptations, Paul Revere and the Raiders and Chuck Berry, amongst others. Guitarist Al Gilhausen introduced Queen Esther to blues musician Hubert Sumlin. Years later, they would reconnect in New York City and perform together frequently.

In 1994, Queen Esther completed a BA in Liberal Arts with a concentration in screenwriting from The New School in Greenwich Village. Her work led to creative collaborations in neo-vaudeville, alt-theater, various alt-rock configurations, (neo) swing bands, trip-hop DJs, spoken word performances, jazz combos, jam bands, various blues configurations, original Off-Broadway plays and musicals, experimental music/art noise and performance art.

== Career ==
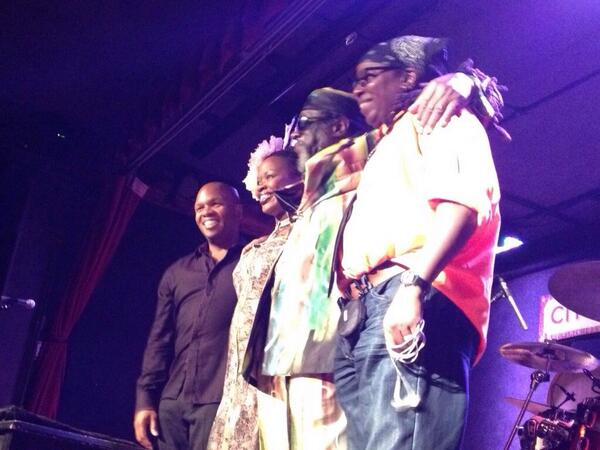
James Blood Ulmer and The Black Rock Experience at City Winery in New York City, 2013 (from l. to r. Mark Peterson, Queen Esther, Ulmer, G. Calvin Weston)

Queen Esther is a member of guitarist James Blood Ulmer's Black Rock Experience with drummer G. Calvin Weston and bassist Mark Peterson, and has toured Europe and Scandinavia with Ulmer, including a stint with his group Odyssey.

After forming the avant-blues duo Hoosegow with Elliott Sharp and releasing the album Mighty (Homestead), Queen Esther introduced Mr. Sumlin to guitarist Elliot Sharp, which led to recording sessions and several European tours for Mr. Sumlin with Sharp's blues collective Terraplane.

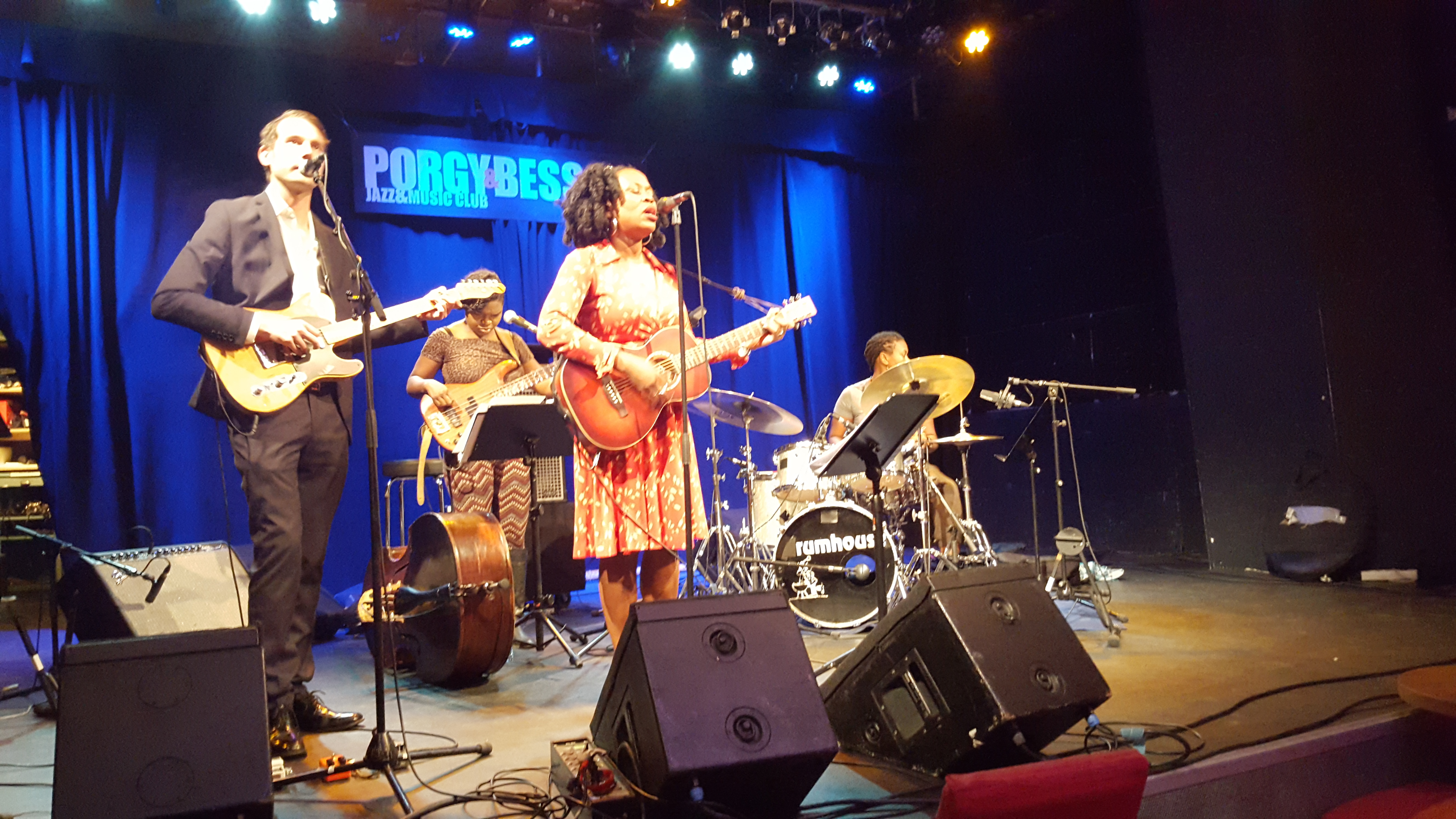
Queen Esther and The Blue Crowns at Porgy and Bess in Vienna, Austria, 2015 (from l. to r. Pete Matthiessen, Mimi Jones, Queen Esther, Shirazette Tinnin)

Queen Esther's music projects include The Hot Five, The Black Rose of Texas featuring Queen Esther, Kat Edmonson and Synead Cidney Nichols on vocals with Cindy Cashdollar on pedal steel guitar, and various configurations of her Black Americana and jazz collective, which includes drummer Steven Williams, bassist Hilliard Greene, lap steel guitarist Raphael McGregor, guitarist Jeff McLaughlin and multi-string instrumentalist Boo Reiners.

Performances and recordings

Queen Esther started her label EL Recordings in 2004 when she released her first Black Americana album Talkin' Fishbowl Blues. She signed an admin publishing deal with Bug Music in 2006 (now owned by BMG Rights Management) and has released five self-produced albums.

As a vocalist, Queen Esther has performed and/or recorded with Speedball Baby, Mona’s Hot Five, Eyal Vilner Big Band, Burnt Sugar Arkestra, Gordon Webster, The Hot Toddies, Richard Barone (The Bongos), Dusty Wright, JC Hopkins Biggish Band, George Gee Swing Orchestra (formerly known as The Make Believe Ballroom Orchestra), Ron Sunshine and The Smoking Section, Michael Arenella and his Dreamland Orchestra, Drew Nugent and the Midnight Society, Dan Levinson's Roof Garden Jass Band, Swingadelic, Dolores "LaLa" Brooks (The Crystals), The New York Jazzharmonic and The Dirtbombs.

Performances include Joe's Pub, Lincoln Center's Summer for the City, Jazz at Lincoln Center's Dizzy's Club, The Kennedy Center, The Apollo Theater's Apollo Music Cafe, New Year's Eve Eve, an annual event produced by The Salon, the bi-annual Jazz Age Lawn Party on Governor's Island, and in the round showcases with the Black Opry at Woody Guthrie Center and Levon Helm Studio.

A member of the 2023 Joe's Pub Working Group, the 2023 Keychange US Talent Development Program and a 2022 National Arts Club Artist Fellow, Queen Esther received a grant from the 2022 New York City Women's Fund for Media, Music and Theater for her upcoming alt-Americana album Blackbirding.

Theater, Solo Performance and Cabaret

In 1996, Queen Esther joined Actor's Equity and SAG-AFTRA when she was cast as an original member of the first national tour of RENT (musical).

After seeing John Leguizamo’s Mambo Mouth at the American Place Theater, Queen Esther was inspired to write, develop and perform The "Moxie" Show, a one person performance art piece that was subsequently featured at Dixon Place, Performance Space New York (formerly Performance Space 122) and The Samuel Beckett Theater.

Her second solo show, the semi-autobiographical Queen Esther: Unemployed Superstar, was performed at Tribeca Playhouse, The New York International Fringe Festival, The Diva Series at George Street Playhouse and the New Work Now! New Performance Now! series at The Public Theater, culminating in a five-week sold-out run at Joe's Pub.

In the aftermath of the 9/11 disaster, Queen Esther hosted and performed in The Tribeca Playhouse Stagedoor Canteen, a weekly hour-long USO-style variety show created and directed by playwright and theater director Jeff Cohen that welcomed performers to entertain Ground Zero relief workers for free. Produced by Cohen and Carol Fineman, the show was featured on NY1, The Today Show, CBS Morning News, The Metro Channel, and Good Morning America, and in Variety and The New York Times. Tribeca Playhouse received a special Drama Desk Award for this production.

In 2002, Queen Esther received a Best Actress AUDELCO award nomination for her work in George C. Wolfe's new musical Harlem Song.

Adapted from newly discovered Harlem-based short stories from the 1930s by Zora Neale Hurston and augmented by Billie Holiday's lost classics, Queen Esther wrote the libretto for The Billie Holiday Project, performing it initially at Lenox Lounge for the Harlem Jazz Shrines and developing it further in performance workshops with Dixon Place and The Field. In April 2012, the show received a performance residency at The Apollo Theater's Music Cafe and featured The Hot Five with a cast that included Queen Esther, Francesca Harper, Charles L. Wallace and Keith L. Thomas.

Queen Esther partnered with The Francesca Harper Project to further explore Billie Holiday's body of work through movement, sound and vision in Billie Holiday: Deconstructed, a theatrical performance that premiered at the Harlem Arts Festival in June, 2012.

Queen Esther was a 2021 New Perspectives Theater Company Short Play Lab Member. Her play That's What Happened was featured in their 2021 Short Play Festival. She is a playwright in residence with the 2022 - 2024 WP Theater "Pipeline" PlayLAB. Her full-length play The Tears of a Megyn premieres Off-Broadway in the spring of 2024.

== Discography ==
=== As leader ===
- Rona (EL Recordings, 2023)
- Gild The Black Lily (EL Recordings, 2021)
- The Other Side (EL Recordings, 2014)
- What is Love? (EL Recordings, 2010)
- Talkin' Fishbowl Blues (EL Recordings, 2004)

=== As member ===
With Hoosegow

- Mighty (Homestead, 1996) with Elliott Sharp

With 52nd Street Blues Project

- Blues & Grass (Chesky, 2004)

With J. C. Hopkins Biggish Band

- Underneath a Brooklyn Moon (Tigerlily, 2005)

=== As guest ===
With Elliott Sharp and Henry Kaiser

- Electric Willie: A Tribute to Willie Dixon (Yellowbird [Germany], 2010)

With The Harlem Experiment

- The Harlem Experiment (Ropeadope, 2007)

With James Blood Ulmer

- No Escape from the Blues: The Electric Lady Sessions (Hyena, 2003)
