= The Woe Betides =

English rock band

- Origin: London, England
- Genres: Rock music, grunge, psychedelic pop, electronica, punk rock, anti-folk, art rock
- Years active: 2008–present
- Label: Songs in the Dark
- Members: Simon Mastrantone, Grundy le Zimbra

The Woe Betides are an English rock band, formed in London in 2008 by Simon Mastrantone and Grundy le Zimbra.

The band's music incorporates a variety of styles, including art rock, grunge, psychedelic pop, anti-folk, punk rock and electronica.

== History ==
Their debut EP Play Dead was released in 2009 by Songs in the Dark records and to critical acclaim. Artrocker magazine called the band "skronky" and described them as being "resolutely lo-fi, DIY, rough around the edges and all the better for it" while NME called the band "Enthralling... deft puppet-masters of Indie."

While initially performing as a two-piece band, the founding members were joined in 2009 by drummer Colonel Sexlife and toured extensively throughout the UK in 2009 and 2010. The Colonel later left the group in 2011.

The band released their debut album Never Sleep in October 2010. The band built upon their grounding in lo-fi pop and experimentalism, incorporating more live drums and developing a heavier, bombastic approach to production. Never Sleep was warmly received by the music press, with compliments ranging from "clever, experimental and poppy" to "an intriguing mash-up of grunge, pop and squidgy electronica".

== Discography ==
=== Studio albums ===
Year	Album
2009	Play Dead EP: Released: 31 January 2009; Label: Songs in the Dark; Formats: CD, Digital Download
2010	Never Sleep: Released: 25 October 2010; Label: Songs in the Dark; Formats: CD, Digital Download

=== Singles ===
Year	Title
2009	"NatWest Tower": Released: 14 December 2009; Label: Songs in the Dark; Formats: Digital Download
2010	"Sylvia": Released: 31 May 2010; Label: Songs in the Dark; Formats: Vinyl, Digital Download; "This Head, This Heart": Released: 11 October 2010; Label: Songs in the Dark; Formats: Digital Download
