= Geoff Muldaur =

American singer, guitarist and composer

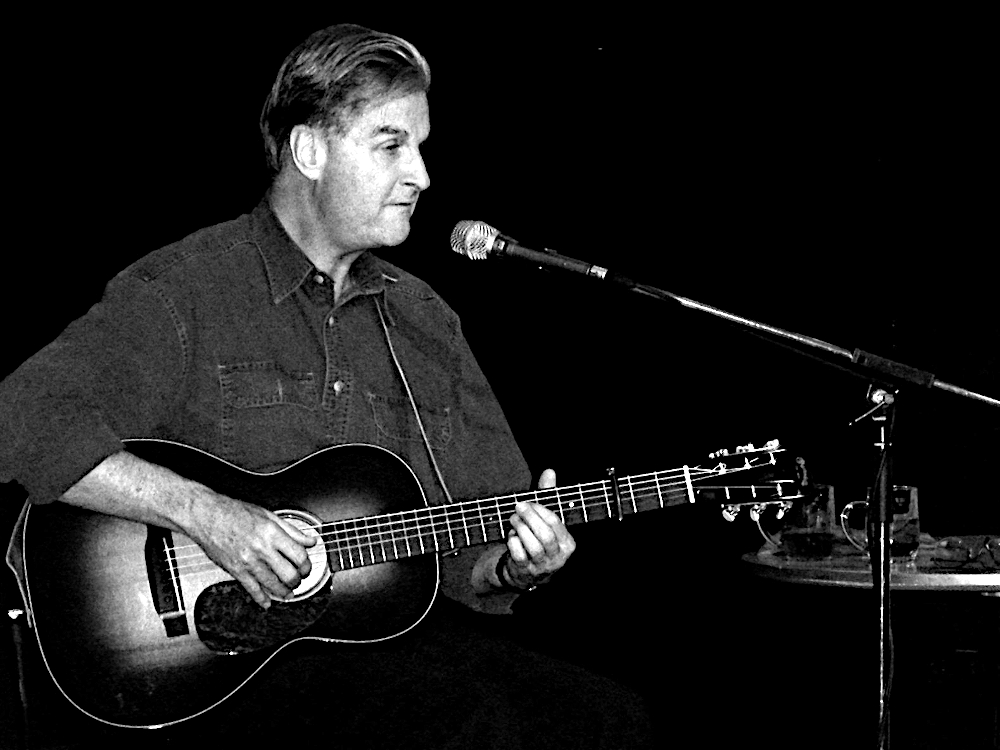
- Muldaur performing in 2006

Background information
- Born: August 12, 1943 (age 83); Pelham, New York, U.S.
- Genres: Folk; blues
- Occupations: Singer; songwriter
- Instruments: Guitar; banjo; penny whistle
- Years active: 1960s–present
- Website: geoffmuldaur.com

Geoff Muldaur (born August 12, 1943) is an American singer, guitarist and composer, who was a founding member of the Jim Kweskin Jug Band and a member of Paul Butterfield's Better Days.

== Career ==
Having established a reputation with the Kweskin Jug Band during the 1960s, Geoff and his then-wife Maria Muldaur recorded their first album, Pottery Pie, for Warner Bros. Records in 1968. This album contained his version of "Brazil" ("Aquarela do Brasil"), which became the theme for the film Brazil (1985) directed by Terry Gilliam. After recording the album, the Muldaurs moved to Woodstock, New York. They separated in 1972, shortly after Geoff Muldaur joined Paul Butterfield's Better Days band.

After leaving the Butterfield band in 1976, Muldaur recorded an album with Amos Garrett, and Geoff Muldaur and the Nite Lites for Hannibal Records. He also recorded with Bobby Charles, Jerry Garcia, Eric Von Schmidt, Bonnie Raitt, and John Cale. In the early 1980s, Muldaur left the stage and recording studio for a working sabbatical. He wrote scores for film and television, won an Emmy Award, and produced albums for Lenny Pickett and Richard Greene. In 2003, Deutsche Grammophon released his album, Private Astronomy: A Vision of the Music of Bix Beiderbecke. In 2009, Muldaur formed Geoff Muldaur and the Texas Sheiks with Stephen Bruton, Cindy Cashdollar, Suzy Thompson, Johnny Nicholas, and Bruce Hughes. Bruton died in 2009, and Tradition & Moderne released the album Texas Sheiks.

== Personal life ==
He married Maria D’Amato in 1964. They had a daughter on March 29, 1964, Jenni Muldaur, who is also a musician. After the Kweskin group broke up, the couple produced two albums. Maria Muldaur began her solo career when their marriage ended in 1972 and retained her married name.

His sister is actress Diana Muldaur. His daughters Jenni and Clare are also musicians.

== Discography ==
=== As leader ===
- Sleepy Man Blues (Prestige, 1964)
- Pottery Pie, with Maria Muldaur (Reprise, 1968)
- Sweet Potatoes, with Maria Muldaur (Reprise, 1972)
- Is Having a Wonderful Time (Reprise, 1975)
- Motion (Reprise, 1976)
- Geoff Muldaur & Amos Garrett (Flying Fish, 1978)
- Blues Boy (Flying Fish, 1979)
- Live in Japan (with Amos Garrett) (Yupiteru [jp], 1979)
- I Ain't Drunk (Hannibal, 1981)
- The Secret Handshake (Hightone, 1998)
- Beautiful Isle of Somewhere (Tradition & Moderne, 1999)
- Password (Hightone, 2000)
- Private Astronomy: A Vision of the Music of Bix Beiderbecke (Edge Music, 2003)
- Texas Sheiks (Tradition & Moderne, 2009)
- His Last Letter (The Amsterdam Project) (Moon River Music, 2021)

With Jim Kweskin

- Jim Kweskin and the Jug Band: Unblushing Brassiness (Vanguard, 1963)
- Jug Band Music (Vanguard, 1965)
- See Reverse Side for Title (Vanguard, 1966)
- Garden of Joy (Reprise, 1967)
- Penny's Farm (Kingswood, 2016)

=== As sideman or guest ===
With Eric Von Schmidt

- The Folk Blues of Eric Von Schmidt (Prestige, 1964)
- Eric Sings Von Schmidt (Prestige, 1965)
- 2nd Right 3rd Row (Poppy, 1972)
- Eric Von Schmidt and the Cruel Family (Philo, 1978)

With others

- Vince Bell, Phoenix (Watermelon, 1994)
- Paul Butterfield, Better Days (Bearsville, 1973)
- Bobby Charles, Bobby Charles (Bearsville, 1972)
- The Everly Brothers, Stories We Could Tell (RCA Victor, 1972)
- John Cale, Slow Dazzle (Island, 1975)
- Mary Flower, Rosewood & Steel (Bluesette, 1996)
- Jerry Garcia, Garcia (Grateful Dead, 1990)
- Jerry Garcia, All Good Things (Rhino, 2004)
- Bob Neuwirth, Bob Neuwirth (Asylum, 1974)
- John Sebastian, Chasin' Gus' Ghost (Hollywood, 1999)
- Loudon Wainwright III, High Wide and Handsome (Proper, 2009)
