= Private Astronomy: A Vision of the Music of Bix Beiderbecke =

Studio album by Geoff Muldaur
- Released: September 30, 2003

Private Astronomy: A Vision of the Music of Bix Beiderbecke is an album by Geoff Muldaur's Futuristic Ensemble, released on September 30, 2003. It features music by the American jazz cornetist, pianist, and composer Bix Beiderbecke. The album was recorded at Your Place Or Mine in Glendale, California, 4th Street Recording and Jai Winding Studios in Santa Monica, California, and four studios in New York City: Back Pocket Recording Studios, Passport Recording, Shelter Island Sound, and Sorcerer Sound.
