= I Know You're Married But I've Got Feelings Too =

Studio album by Martha Wainwright
- Released: May 10, 2008
- Genre: Folk; pop
- Length: 52:59
- Label: MapleMusic; Zoë
- Producer: Brad Albetta, Martin Terefe, Tore Johansson, Jeff Trott, Kate McGarrigle

Martha Wainwright chronology
Martha Wainwright (2005)	I Know You're Married But I've Got Feelings Too (2008)	Sans Fusils, Ni Souliers, à Paris: Martha Wainwright's Piaf Record (2009)

Professional ratings
Aggregate scores
Source	Rating
Metacritic	77/100
Review scores
Source	Rating
AllMusic	4/5 stars
BBC	(Positive)
DIY	7/10
The Guardian	4/5 stars
LAUNCHcast	9/10
MSN Music (Consumer Guide)	(dud)
The Observer	4/5 stars
Pitchfork	7.7/10
Rolling Stone	4/5 stars

I Know You're Married But I've Got Feelings Too is the second full-length album of Canadian singer-songwriter Martha Wainwright. It was released in Australia on May 10, 2008, with other countries to follow. The 14-track album features 12 original tracks and cover versions of Pink Floyd's "See Emily Play" and, as a bonus track in some countries, the Eurythmics' "Love Is a Stranger".

The Australian release included a limited edition digipak with additional images and the bonus track. "Comin' Tonight" was released as an iTunes exclusive download in Australia in April 2008.

== Track listing ==
All tracks are written by Martha Wainwright

I Know You're Married But I've Got Feelings Too track listing
No.	Title	Writer(s)	Producer(s)	Length
1.	"Bleeding All Over You"	Martha Wainwright	Brad Albetta	3:45
2.	"You Cheated Me"	Wainwright	Albetta	3:14
3.	"Jesus & Mary"	Wainwright	Martin Terefe	3:40
4.	"Comin' Tonight"	Wainwright	Terefe	3:17
5.	"Tower Song"	Wainwright	Tore Johansson	3:27
6.	"Hearts Club Band"	Wainwright	Albetta	4:21
7.	"So Many Friends"	Wainwright	Albetta; Jeff Trott	3:24
8.	"In the Middle of the Night"	Wainwright	Albetta	4:44
9.	"The George Song"	Wainwright	Terefe; Mike Hedges; Ger McDonnell	3:35
10.	"Niger River"	Wainwright	Albetta	3:52
11.	"Jimi"	Wainwright	Johansson	5:24
12.	"See Emily Play"	Syd Barrett	Kate McGarrigle	2:18
13.	"I Wish I Were"	Wainwright	Terefe	4:18
14.	"Love Is a Stranger"	Annie Lennox; David A. Stewart	Albetta	3:40
Total length:				52:59

iTunes bonus track
No.	Title	Writer(s)	Producer(s)	Length
1.	"The Car Song"	Wainwright	Michel Pépin	3:06
Total length:				56:05

== Personnel ==
Musicians

- Martha Wainwright – vocals, acoustic guitar, electric guitar, hand claps
- Brad Albetta – electric bass, piano, drum programming, background vocals, hand claps
- Claes Björklund – keyboards
- Jim Campilongo – electric guitar
- Marius de Vries – drum programming
- Bill Dobrow – drums and percussion
- Donald Fagen – synthesizer (7)
- Martin Gerstad – string arrangement
- Cameron Grieder – nylon strings guitar, electric guitar
- Smokey Hormel – electric guitar (6,8)
- Garth Hudson – keyboards, piano
- Tore Johansson – guitar, vocals
- Matt Johnson – drums
- Julia Kent – cello
- Lily Lanken – vocals (9,11), background vocals (12,13)
- Jens Lindgard – bass
- Anna McGarrigle – keyboard synths and background vocals (12)
- Kate McGarrigle – hand claps (2), Wurlitzer (12), backing vocals (12)
- Joe McGinty – synths
- Mark McGowan – trumpet
- Max Mosten – violin
- Rich Pagano – drums
- Dan Reiser – drums
- Flip Runesson – strings
- Chaim Tannenbaum – mandolin
- Martin Terefe – bass, guitar
- Kamila Thompson – background vocals
- Alex Toff – drums
- Pete Townshend – electric guitar (2,4)
- Jeff Trott – bass, electric guitar
- Rufus Wainwright – vocals (9)
- Doug Wieselman – tenor sax, bass clarinet, Indian flute

Production

- Produced by Brad Albetta, Tore Johansson, Kate McGarrigle, Martin Terefe, Jeff Trott
- Mixed by Michael Brauer, Mike Hedges, Tore Johansson, Ger McDonnell
- Engineered by Brad Albetta, David Carlsson, Brian Fulk, Dyre Gormsen, Tim Hatfield, Don Murnaghan, Michel Pepin, Tom Schick, George Tandero
- Additional engineering by Brad Albetta, Brian Fulk, Borza Gomeshi
- Engineering assisted by Iain Hill.
- Recorded at Allaire Studios, The Bubble (Denmark), GULA Studios (Sweden), Kensaltown Recording Studios (London), Mayk Music (Quebec), MonkeyBoy Studios (New York City), Querbes Service (Montreal).
- Mastered by Greg Calbi at Sterling Sound, New York City

== Charts ==
Chart performance for I Know You're Married But I've Got Feelings Too
Chart (2008)	Peak position
Australian Albums (ARIA)	19
Belgian Albums (Ultratop Flanders)	40
Canadian Albums (Billboard)	6
Danish Albums (Hitlisten)	19
Dutch Albums (Album Top 100)	63
European Top 100 Albums	63
Irish Albums (IRMA)	28
Norwegian Albums (VG-lista)	12
Swedish Albums (Sverigetopplistan)	15
UK Albums (OCC)	29
US Heatseekers Albums (Billboard)	10

== Release history ==
Release history for I Know You're Married But I've Got Feelings Too
Region	Date	Label
Australia	May 10, 2008	Shock
United Kingdom	June 10, 2008	Drowned in Sound
United States	June 10, 2008	Zoë
