= Sans Fusils, Ni Souliers, à Paris: Martha Wainwright's Piaf Record =

Sans fusils, ni souliers, à Paris: Martha Wainwright's Piaf Record

Live album by Martha Wainwright
- Released: November 9, 2009
- Recorded: June 2009
- Labels: MapleMusic; V2
- Producer: Hal Willner

Martha Wainwright chronology
I Know You're Married But I've Got Feelings Too (2008)	Sans fusils, ni souliers, à Paris: Martha Wainwright's Piaf Record (2009)	Come Home to Mama (2012)

Professional ratings
Review scores
Source	Rating
The Guardian	4/5 stars
Sunday Tribune	3/5 stars
The Times	4/5 stars

Sans fusils, ni souliers, à Paris: Martha Wainwright's Piaf Record is a live album by Canadian-American singer-songwriter Martha Wainwright featuring Thomas Bartlett, Doug Wieselman, and Brad Albetta, and is a tribute to French singer Édith Piaf. The album was recorded during three performances in New York's Dixon Place Theatre in June 2009. The accompanying DVD was filmed by Jamie Catto. The album was released (number MRCD6523) in Canada on MapleMusic Recordings. On November 11, 2009, Wainwright recreated her New York performances at London's Barbican Centre. The album cover photography was shot by JC Hopkins. The name of the album comes from the lyrics of the song "Les Grognards".

== Track listing ==
1. "La Foule"
2. "Adieu mon cœur"
3. "Une enfant"
4. "L'Accordéoniste"
5. "Le Brun et le Blond"
6. "Les Grognards"
7. "C'est toujours la même histoire"
8. "Hudsonia"
9. "C'est à Hambourg"
10. "Non, la vie n'est pas triste"
11. "Soudain une vallée"
12. "Marie Trottoir"
13. "Le Métro de Paris"
14. "Le Chant d'amour"
15. "Les Blouses blanches"

DVD

1. "Le Chant d'amour" (live)
2. "La Foule" (live)
3. "Non, la vie n'est pas triste" (live)
4. "Adieu mon cœur" (live)

== Charts ==
Chart performance for Sans fusils, ni souliers, à Paris: Martha Wainwright's Piaf Record
Chart (2009–2010)	Peak position
Canadian Albums (Billboard)	25
Norwegian Albums (VG-lista)	29
