= Love Will Be Reborn =

Studio album by Martha Wainwright
- Released: August 20, 2021
- Length: 48:47
- Label: Pheromone; Cooking Vinyl
- Producer: Pierre Marchand

Martha Wainwright chronology
| Goodnight City (2016) | Love Will Be Reborn (2021) |

Professional ratings
Aggregate scores
| Source | Rating |
|---|---|
| Metacritic | 83/100 |
Review scores
| Source | Rating |
| American Songwriter | 4/5 stars |
| Pitchfork | 7.6/10 |

Love Will Be Reborn is the fifth studio album by Martha Wainwright, released on August 20, 2021, by Pheromone Records and Cooking Vinyl. It was produced by Pierre Marchand.

== Promotion ==
The title track serves as the lead single. Wainwright toured throughout the United Kingdom in September 2021.

== Track listing ==
| No. | Title | Writer(s) | Length |
|---|---|---|---|
| 1. | "Middle of the Lake" | Martha Wainwright | 3:36 |
| 2. | "Getting Older" | Martha Wainwright | 4:14 |
| 3. | "Love Will Be Reborn" | Martha Wainwright | 4:20 |
| 4. | "Being Right" | Martha Wainwright | 4:36 |
| 5. | "Report Card" | Martha Wainwright | 6:06 |
| 6. | "Body and Soul" | Martha Wainwright | 5:16 |
| 7. | "Hole in My Heart" | Martha Wainwright | 3:44 |
| 8. | "Justice" | Martha Wainwright | 4:39 |
| 9. | "Sometimes" | Martha Wainwright | 4:10 |
| 10. | "Rainbow" | Martha Wainwright | 4:42 |
| 11. | "Falaise de Malaise" | Martha Wainwright | 3:24 |

== Deluxe bonus tracks ==
| No. | Title | Writer(s) | Length |
|---|---|---|---|
| 12. | "Thanksgiving" | Loudon Wainwright III | 5:01 |
| 13. | "Dinner at Eight" | Rufus Wainwright | 4:10 |
| 14. | "Tell My Sister" | Kate McGarrigle | 4:06 |
| 15. | "Love Will Be Reborn 2" | Martha Wainwright | 4:15 |
| 16. | "Go Leave" | Kate McGarrigle | 3:54 |

== Charts ==
Chart performance for Love Will Be Reborn
| Chart (2021) | Peak position |
|---|---|
| Scottish Albums (OCC) | 21 |
| UK Independent Albums (OCC) | 12 |
