= There's a Last Time for Everything =

Studio album by Lucy Wainwright Roche
- Released: October 15, 2013
- Genre: Pop rock
- Length: 41:08
- Label: One Ear Up Music

Lucy Wainwright Roche chronology
Lucy (2010)	There's a Last Time for Everything (2013)	Mud & Apples (2016)

There's a Last Time for Everything is the second full-length studio album by singer-songwriter Lucy Wainwright Roche. The album was recorded over ten days in Nashville in collaboration with producer Jordan Brooke Hamlin. Of the quick recording, Lucy said, "Jordan and I crafted these tracks over long summer days that stretched into late, late nights. We were gloriously swept up in the process, like kids working on a secret project. Because we were working with a limited time frame, we went with our gut on every decision. There wasn't time for us to second guess or retrace our steps. The urgency of working that way was exciting and freeing – and also a little bit terrifying." The album was released on October 15, 2013.

Two noted featured musicians on the album include Colin Meloy of The Decemberists and Mary Chapin Carpenter. The album also features one cover, a stripped-down version of Robyn's "Call Your Girlfriend," reworked by Wainwright Roche and Hamlin to feature guitar and harmony vocals only.

Tasked with how to promote and release the record without a record company, Wainwright Roche decided to offer the album for pre-order with previously unreleased tracks recorded with her mother, artist Suzzy Roche (Lucy's father is fellow artist Loudon Wainwright III). Those tracks led to a full-length album between Lucy and Suzzy, called Fairytale and Myth. Wainwright Roche also offered private in-home shows, which allowed further financing for the album.

== Track listing ==
1. "The Year Will End Again" - 3:35
2. "Seek & Hide" feat. Colin Meloy - 4:09
3. "Last Time" - 2:56
4. "Monte Rosa Range" - 2:32
5. "Look Busy" - 3:51
6. "Canterbury Song" - 3:20
7. "Call Your Girlfriend" - 4:29
8. "A Quiet Line" feat. Mary Chapin Carpenter - 3:34
9. "The Same" - 3:22
10. "Take What You're Given" - 3:36
11. "Under the Gun" - 5:24
