= Goodnight City =

Studio album by Martha Wainwright
- Released: November 11, 2016
- Label: Cadence Music; PIAS
- Producer: Brad Albetta; Thomas "Doveman" Bartlett

Martha Wainwright chronology
Come Home to Mama (2012)	Goodnight City (2016)	Love Will Be Reborn (2021)

Professional ratings
Aggregate scores
Source	Rating
AnyDecentMusic?	7.2/10
Metacritic	76/100
Review scores
Source	Rating
The A.V. Club	B+
The Guardian	4/5 stars
Exclaim!	4/5 stars
Under the Radar	7/10 stars
The Independent	3/5 stars

Goodnight City is an album by Martha Wainwright, released by the record labels Cadence Music and PIAS on November 11, 2016. The album was produced by Wainwright's husband, bassist Brad Albetta, and Thomas "Doveman" Bartlett. Guest contributors include Merrill Garbus, Glen Hansard, novelist Michael Ondaatje, Beth Orton, and members of the McGarrigle and Wainwright families. "Around the Bend" is the album's lead single.

== Composition ==
Wainwright has said about the writers who contributed to the album: "Because these writers know me and because I was able to personalize these songs by changing things here and there, I made them feel as if I wrote them myself. Somehow they wonderfully reflect my life and I am so thankful to the other artists for writing them."

== Track listing ==
All tracks written by Martha Wainwright, except where noted.

1. "Around the Bend"
2. "Franci"
3. "Traveller"
4. "Look into My Eyes" (Lily Lanken, Anna McGarrigle, Martha Wainwright)
5. "Before the Children Came Along"
6. "Window"
7. "Piano Music" (Thomas Bartlett, Michael Ondaatje)
8. "Alexandria" (Beth Orton)
9. "So Down"
10. "One of Us" (Glen Hansard, Martha Wainwright)
11. "Take the Reins" (Merrill Garbus)
12. "Francis" (Rufus Wainwright)

== Charts ==
Chart (2016)	Peak position
Belgian Albums (Ultratop Flanders)	195
Canadian Albums (Billboard)	41
UK Independent Albums (OCC)	24
