= I Will Internalize =

I Will Internalize is a 2005 EP by Martha Wainwright. Released only in Canada, the EP collects several tracks from the EPs that Wainwright released prior to her full-length debut, Martha Wainwright. Track 3, "Bring Back My Heart", is Wainwright's first recorded duet with her brother, Rufus Wainwright.

== Track listing ==
All songs written by Martha Wainwright except where noted.

| Track number | Track title | Producer | Track length |
|---|---|---|---|
| 1 | "I Will Internalize" | Brad Albetta, Martha Wainwright | 3:26 |
| 2 | "Baby" | Brad Albetta, Martha Wainwright | 3:56 |
| 3 | "Bring Back My Heart" | Martha Wainwright | 3:18 |
| 4 | "New York, New York, New York" | Martha Wainwright, Nicholas Hill | 7:05 |
| 5 | "Dis, quand reviendras-tu?" (Barbara) | Pierre Marchand | 4:09 |
