= Songs of Travel and Other Verses =

Book of poetry by Robert Stevenson

1896 edition of Stevenson's Songs of Travel

Songs of Travel and Other Verses is an 1896 book of poetry by Robert Louis Stevenson. Originally published by Chatto & Windus, it explores the author's perennial themes of travel and adventure. The work gained a new public and popularity when it was set to music in Songs of Travel by Ralph Vaughan Williams.
