= Martha Wainwright (album) =

Studio album by Martha Wainwright
- Released: April 12, 2005
- Recorded: 2005
- Genre: Folk, pop
- Length: 49:08
- Label: MapleMusic; Zoë
- Producer: Martha Wainwright; Brad Albetta

Martha Wainwright chronology
Ground Floor (1997)	Martha Wainwright (2005)	I Know You're Married But I've Got Feelings Too (2008)

Professional ratings
Aggregate scores
Source	Rating
Metacritic	80/100
Review scores
Source	Rating
AllMusic	4/5 stars
Blender	4/5 stars
Entertainment Weekly	A−
The Guardian	4/5 stars
Pitchfork	7.8/10
Mojo	4/5 stars
Q	4/5 stars
Rolling Stone	3.5/5 stars
Slant Magazine	4/5 stars
Uncut	8/10

Martha Wainwright is the debut album of Montreal singer Martha Wainwright, released on April 12, 2005. The album received generally favourable reviews.

== Track listing ==
All tracks by Martha Wainwright except where noted.

1. "Far Away" – 2:54
2. "G.P.T." – 2:44
3. "Factory" – 3:32
4. "These Flowers" – 4:11
5. "Ball & Chain" – 3:18
6. "Don't Forget" – 4:11
7. "This Life" – 6:01
8. "When the Day Is Short" – 3:46
9. "Bloody Mother Fucking Asshole" – 3:14
10. "TV Show" – 4:09
11. "The Maker" – 4:08
12. "Who Was I Kidding?" – 4:10
13. "Whither Must I Wander" (Robert Louis Stevenson, Ralph Vaughan Williams) – 2:47

=== Special edition bonus tracks ===
From the five-song EP, I Will Internalize, also released by MapleMusic, and which preceded the full album release. Songs excluded from the special edition were "I Will Internalize" and "New York, New York, New York".

14. "Bring Back My Heart" (featuring Rufus Wainwright) – 3:17
15. "Baby" – 3:56
16. "Dis, quand reviendras-tu?" (Barbara) – 4:10

== Personnel ==
- Martha Wainwright – vocals, electric guitar (track 11), guitar, producer
- Cameron Greider – electric guitar (tracks 1, 3, 5, 8, 10, and 11)
- Bill Dobrow – drums (tracks 1–3, 5, 8, 10, and 11)
- Brad Albetta – bass guitar (tracks 1, 3, 6, 7, and 11), upright bass (track 9), Moog bass (track 4), keyboards (tracks 3, 4, 6, and 7), Rhodes (track 9), electric guitar (track 3)
- Joe McGinty – piano (tracks 1 and 7), keyboards (tracks 7 and 11)
- Jeff Hill – bass guitar (track 2)
- Tom Mennier – piano (tracks 2–5, 10, 13) keyboards (track 2), Wurlitzer (track 3), background vocals (track 4)
- Jane Scarpantoni – cello (track 2)
- Lily Lanken – background vocals (tracks 2, 4, 5, 8, and 10)
- Dan Reiser – drums (track 3)
- Kate McGarrigle – banjo (track 3), piano (track 6)
- Erin Hill – harp (tracks 4 and 13)
- Garth Hudson – organ (track 4), keyboards (track 12), alto saxophone (track 12)
- Rufus Wainwright – background vocals (track 6)
- Alan Besozi – percussion (track 6)
- Dan Albetta – electric guitar (track 7)
- JC Hopkins – electric guitar (track 7)
- Disco D – drum programming (track 7)
- Paul Bryan – bass (tracks 5 and 8)

== Charts ==
Chart performance for Martha Wainwright
Chart (2005–2006)	Peak position
Canadian Albums (Nielsen SoundScan)	18
Dutch Alternative Albums (Alternative Top 30)	12
Irish Albums (IRMA)	47
Norwegian Albums (VG-lista)	39
Scottish Albums (OCC)	53
Swedish Albums (Sverigetopplistan)	49
UK Albums (OCC)	63
UK Independent Albums (OCC)	8
US Heatseekers Albums (Billboard)	43
