= The Wainwright Sisters =

Singer-songwriter duo

- Origin: United States/Canada
- Genres: Folk, pop rock
- Years active: 2015–present
- Labels: PIAS
- Members: Martha Wainwright; Lucy Wainwright Roche

The Wainwright Sisters are a singer-songwriter duo featuring the Canadian-American Martha Wainwright and her American half-sister Lucy Wainwright Roche. In November 2015 they released the album Songs in the Dark, which includes a number of lullabies.
