= Martha Wainwright =

Canadian musician

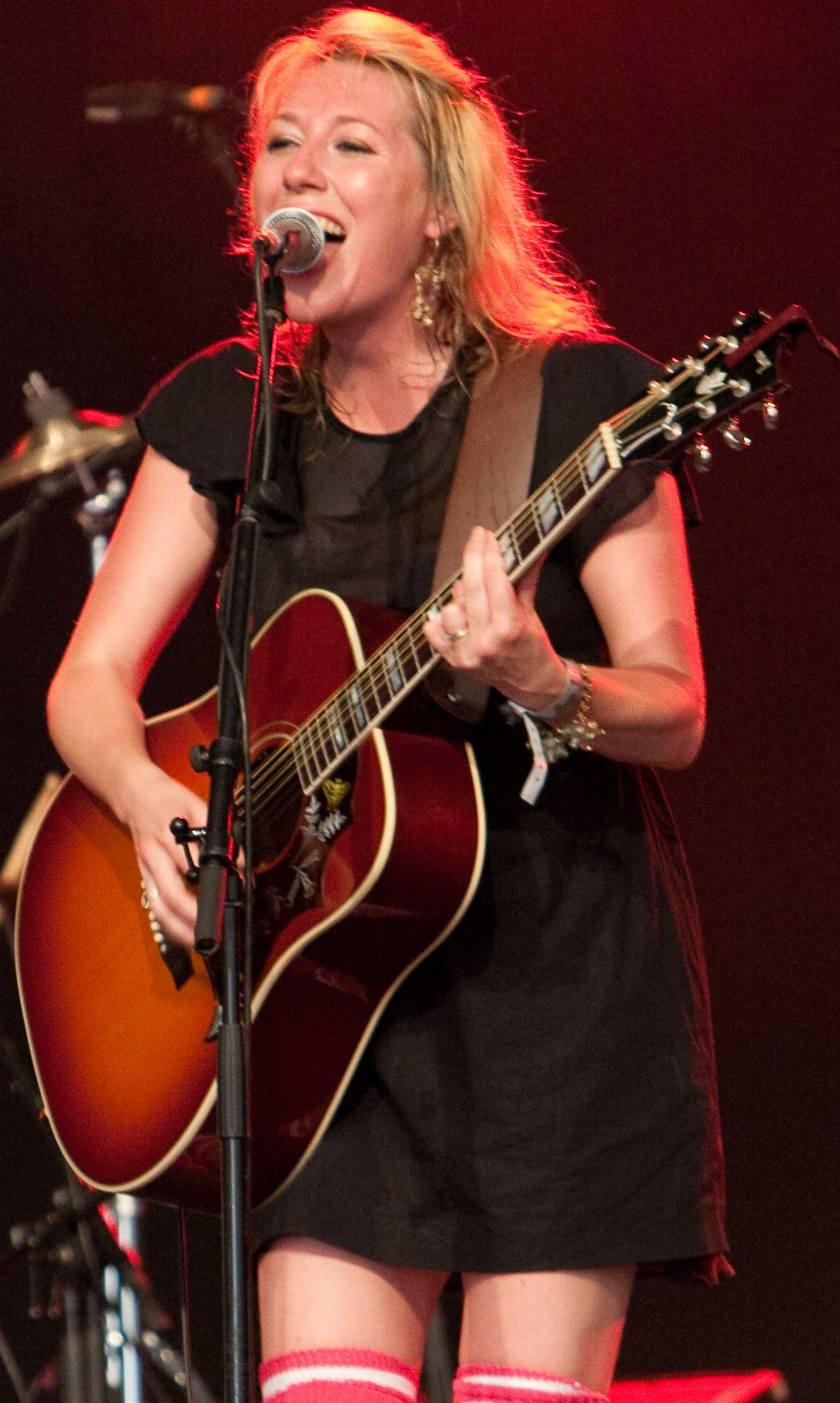
- Wainwright performing at the Cambridge Folk Festival, 2008

Background information
- Born: May 8, 1976 (age 50)
- Origin: Montreal, Quebec, Canada
- Genres: Folk, pop
- Occupation: Singer-songwriter
- Years active: 1996–present
- Label: MapleMusic
- Website: marthawainwright.com

Martha Wainwright (born May 8, 1976) is a Canadian singer-songwriter and musician. She has released seven critically acclaimed studio albums.

Wainwright is the daughter of musicians Kate McGarrigle and Loudon Wainwright III and the younger sister of singer–composer Rufus Wainwright.

Martha Wainwright's live performances have received critical praise, with The Telegraph writing that her concerts "leave in no doubt that she is a singular star." Apart from music, she has appeared in several film projects, including Martin Scorsese's The Aviator and the HBO miniseries Olive Kitteridge alongside Frances McDormand. Wainwright owns and operates Ursa, a café, concert-hall, bar, and recording space in Montreal.

== Early life ==
Martha was born in New York City on May 8, 1976, to folk musicians Kate McGarrigle and Loudon Wainwright III. She moved to Montreal with her mother and brother when she was one year old, and was raised in Montreal in a musical family. She is Rufus Wainwright's sister and they frequently perform together and collaborate on each other's albums. Martha is also half-sister to Lucy Wainwright Roche, with whom she collaborated on the album Songs In The Dark, which was nominated for a Juno Award.

== Career ==
=== Debut EPs and Martha Wainwright ===
Martha Wainwright's first release was an album-length independent cassette of ten tracks, Ground Floor, released in 1997. Wainwright released two EPs in 2005—Bloody Mother Fucking Asshole and I Will Internalize—both of which contained some tracks that also appeared on her self-titled studio album, Martha Wainwright. PopMatters called the Bloody Mother Fucking Asshole EP "a rebellious introductory stance for an artist looking to provoke or silence potential critics." The Sunday Times included the song "Bloody Mother Fucking Asshole" in their songs of the year and Rolling Stone called it "a blistering prelude to her debut album." "Bloody Mother Fucking Asshole" was inspired by Wainwright's father, Loudon Wainwright III. She wrote the track as a response to her father's way of writing songs about his family, rather than tending to them. Despite the sentiment, she collaborated a year earlier with Loudon on the song "You Never Phone" on his 2003 album So Damn Happy.

"Bloody Mother Fucking Asshole" was used at the end of the second episode in season three of the Netflix original series Orange is the New Black, and at the end of the fourth episode in season one of the HBO original series Big Little Lies.

Wainwright's self-titled debut album was released through Zoë Records and Drowned in Sound in April 2005, and earned Wainwright a nomination for New Artist of the Year at the 2006 Juno Awards. The album also reached number 43 on Billboard's Top Heatseekers chart. Her debut album featured contributions from her mother, Kate McGarrigle, her brother, Rufus Wainwright, her cousin, Lily Lanken, as well as organ and saxophone from Garth Hudson of The Band. Pitchfork wrote that the album "proves Martha Wainwright has a strong, distinct, fully formed musical identity, which would be just as impressive by any other name."

In 2006, Wainwright collaborated with Snow Patrol on their song "Set the Fire to the Third Bar", off their critically and commercially successful album Eyes Open. Frontman Gary Lightbody says that he wrote the song with Wainwright's vocals specifically in mind. Alvin Chan from musicOMH raved that "Lightbody's vocals are perfectly complemented by Canadian songstress Martha Wainwright, whose arrestingly haunting voice is put to good use."

=== I Know You're Married But I've Got Feelings Too ===
Wainwright's second album, I Know You're Married But I've Got Feelings Too, was released through Zoë Records and Drowned in Sound in June 2008, resulting in the No. 10 position on the Top Heatseekers Billboard charts and No. 6 on the Billboard Canada Music Charts, among other chart positions throughout Europe and Australia. The album was hailed for showcasing Wainwright's musical maturity and talent as a songwriter, and was a Long List Nominee for the 2009 Polaris Music Prize. The album features 12 original tracks and cover versions of Pink Floyd's "See Emily Play" and, as a bonus track in some countries, the Eurythmics' "Love Is a Stranger". The Australian release included a limited edition digipak with additional images and the bonus track. "Comin' Tonight" was released as an iTunes exclusive download in Australia in April 2008.

In addition to returning collaborators Anna McGarrigle, Kate McGarrigle, Rufus Wainwright, and Garth Hudson, Donald Fagen of Steely Dan contributed synthesizers on "So Many Friends", and Pete Townshend played electric guitar on "You Cheated Me" and "Comin' Tonight".

=== Sans Fusils, Ni Souliers, à Paris: Martha Wainwright's Piaf Record ===
Sans Fusils, Ni Souliers, à Paris: Martha Wainwright's Piaf Record, a tribute to legendary French singer Édith Piaf, was released in November 2009. An homage to Piaf, it was received with glowing reviews, leaving audiences "stunned" by Wainwright's "incredible range and talent". The album was recorded during three performances in New York's Dixon Place Theatre in June 2009. The accompanying DVD was filmed by Jamie Catto. The name of the album comes from the lyrics to Piaf's song "Les Grognards".

=== Come Home to Mama ===
Come Home To Mama was released on October 15, 2012. The album was recorded at Sean Lennon's home studio in New York City and produced by Cibo Matto's Yuka Honda. Guest musicians on the album included Honda, Lennon, Wilco guitarist Nels Cline, and Dirty Three drummer Jim White. "Proserpina", the album's first single, was written by Wainwright's mother, Kate McGarrigle, who died in 2010. Produced by Cibo Matto's Yuka Honda, it was heralded by Mojo Magazine as a "substantial and brilliantly sung career best." The album peaked at #6 on the Billboard Canada Music Charts and #21 US Top Heatseekers Billboard charts. The song "Four Black Sheep" was originally recorded in 2009 for CBC Radio 2's Great Canadian Song Quest.

=== Trauma ===
In 2013, she recorded the soundtrack album for the fourth season of the television drama series Trauma. For the soundtrack project, Wainwright selected songs drawn mainly from the Quebec musical repertoire. In addition to covers of Offenbach, Claude Dubois and Daniel Bélanger, Wainwright re-recorded three of her own songs in French as well as one by Kate & Anna McGarrigle.

=== Songs in the Dark ===
In 2015, Wainwright collaborated with her half-sister Lucy Wainwright Roche on the album Songs in the Dark. Released under the name The Wainwright Sisters, the album featured a suite of lullabies that their mothers Kate McGarrigle and Suzzy Roche sang to them as children, in addition to songs by Woody Guthrie, Jimmie Rogers, and their father Loudon Wainwright III. Details of the album were announced in September 2015. The song "El Condor Pasa" premiered on Speakeasy, a blog affiliated with The Wall Street Journal, via SoundCloud, on October 7, 2015. Andy Gill of The Independent gave the album four out of five stars and wrote, "if ever an album merited the epithet 'charming', this is it." The album was nominated for Traditional Roots Album of the Year at the 2016 Juno Awards.

=== Goodnight City ===
Goodnight City was released in November 2016, and received notable praise from Exclaim!, NPR, and The Guardian, who called it "uplifting and powerful." Unlike previous albums, Martha Wainwright chose to co-write several of the songs on Goodnight City with friends and other notable songwriters, including Beth Orton, Glen Hansard, Michael Ondaatje, and Merrill Garbus of Tune-Yards. Recorded in Montreal, Goodnight City was produced by Thomas Bartlett, who previously worked with Sufjan Stevens and Glen Hansard. The album reached #41 on the Billboard Canadian Music charts.

In May 2020, Wainwright released "Wolves", a duet with Rufus Wainwright that was recorded during the sessions for Goodnight City.

=== Love Will Be Reborn ===
In 2021, Wainwright released Love Will Be Reborn, which has been received as her best album since her self-titled debut. Love Will Be Reborn was made during the pandemic and recorded in Wainwright's hometown of Montreal, in the basement of her café-bar, Ursa, which also served as a studio. The songs on the album were largely influenced by her divorce from producer Brad Albetta. Wainwright began writing the album in 2017 after her separation from Albetta. Wainwright has described the album as "more on a broader perspective of themes of life and death, and time and trust and lack of trust, and parenthood and all of these things that sort of seem like a much bigger, broader, perspective and a deeper, more layered life."

The album features Toronto musicians Thom Gill, Phil Melanson, Morgan Moore, and Josh Cole of Bernice, and was produced by Pierre Marchand, who also produced several of Kate & Anna McGarrigle's albums. Love Will Be Reborn received universal acclaim upon its release. Pitchfork wrote that, "Love Will Be Reborn feels at once bigger and smaller than her previous material, with each quiet rumination leading her toward grander musings on love, grief, and motherhood." American Songwriter wrote that Love Will Be Reborn "could be considered Martha Wainwright's tour de force, a de facto declaration of outrage and emotion shared with full intent and without hesitation," and hailed that "if artistry is the product of passion, then Wainwright has demonstrated yet again that she's capable of channeling it better than most."

== Other projects ==
Martha Wainwright has contributed songs to various soundtracks and compilation albums, including The Aviator (2004), Leonard Cohen: I'm Your Man (2005), and Song of America (2007).

In 2009, Wainwright appeared on her father's album High Wide & Handsome: The Charlie Poole Project, which won the 2010 Grammy Award for Best Traditional Folk Album.

Martha Wainwright participated in the 2015 edition of Canada Reads, advocating for Jocelyne Saucier's novel And the Birds Rained Down.

In 2020, she hosted the television series Mix sonore, a bilingual production featuring Canadian musicians. The show was broadcast on the network Unis TV.

In 2019, Wainwright opened a café-bar in Montreal called Ursa on Parc Avenue. Several artists have performed at the venue since it opened, including Patrick Watson, La Force, The Barr Brothers, Rufus Wainwright, and Loudon Wainwright III. Her 2021 album, Love Will Be Reborn, was recorded at Ursa during the COVID-19 pandemic.

During the pandemic, Wainwright performed a series of rooftop concerts in Montreal. She spearheaded several balcony sing-alongs working alongside POP Montreal, where Montrealers sang at night on their balconies to uniting community anthems, including Leonard Cohens "So Long, Marianne" and "I Lost My Baby" by Jean Leloup.

Wainwright released her memoirs in English: Stories I Might Regret Telling You and in French: Rien de grave n'est encore arrivé translated by Fanny Britt in the spring of 2022.

She appeared on Patrick Watson's 2025 album Uh Oh, performing vocals on the song "House on Fire". The song was shortlisted for the 2026 SOCAN Polaris Song Prize.

== Personal life ==
Wainwright married her producer and musical collaborator Brad Albetta in September 2007. They divorced in 2018. They have two sons, Arcangelo and Francis.

== Discography ==
- Bloody Mother Fucking Asshole (EP) (2005)
- Martha Wainwright (2005)
- I Know You're Married But I've Got Feelings Too (2008)
- Come Home to Mama (2012)
- Trauma (2013)
- Goodnight City (2016)
- Love Will Be Reborn (2021)
- 6 Songs (2025)
