= Come Home to Mama =

Studio album by Martha Wainwright
- Released: October 15, 2012
- Genre: Folk; pop rock
- Producer: Yuka Honda

Martha Wainwright chronology
Sans Fusils, Ni Souliers, à Paris: Martha Wainwright's Piaf Record (2009)	Come Home to Mama (2012)	Goodnight City (2016)

Come Home to Mama is the third studio album by singer-songwriter Martha Wainwright, released on October 15, 2012. The album was recorded at Sean Lennon's home studio in New York City and produced by Yuka Honda. Guest musicians include Honda, Lennon, Wilco guitarist Nels Cline and Dirty Three drummer Jim White. "Proserpina", the album's first single, was written by Wainwright's deceased mother, Kate McGarrigle.

== Composition ==
Come Home to Mama was recorded at Sean Lennon's home studio in New York City and produced by Yuka Honda. Guest musicians include Honda, Lennon, Wilco guitarist Nels Cline and Dirty Three drummer Jim White.

The song "Four Black Sheep" was originally recorded in 2009 for CBC Radio 2's Great Canadian Song Quest.

== Track listing ==
No.	Title	Writer(s)	Length
1.	"I Am Sorry"	Wainwright	2:53
2.	"Can You Believe It?"	Wainwright	3:24
3.	"Radio Star"	Wainwright	3:57
4.	"Proserpina"	Kate McGarrigle	4:05
5.	"Leave Behind"	Wainwright	3:51
6.	"Four Black Sheep"	Wainwright	4:25
7.	"Some People"	Wainwright	3:10
8.	"I Wanna Make an Arrest"	Wainwright	3:47
9.	"All Your Clothes"	Wainwright	4:21
10.	"Everything Wrong"	Wainwright	4:22

Limited edition bonus tracks
No.	Title	Writer(s)	Length
11.	"I Wanna Make an Arrest" (acoustic demo)	Wainwright	3:10
12.	"All Your Clothes" (acoustic demo)	Wainwright	4:54
13.	"Four Black Sheep" (acoustic demo)	Wainwright	4:13

== Charts ==
Chart performance for Come Home to Mama
Chart (2012)	Peak position
Australian Albums (ARIA)	77
Belgian Albums (Ultratop Flanders)	93
Canadian Albums (Billboard)	6
UK Albums (OCC)	58
US Heatseekers Albums (Billboard)	21
