= Eyeland =

eyeland

Studio album by the Low Anthem
- Released: June 17, 2016
- Studio: Eyeland Recording Studio, Columbus Theatre (Providence, Rhode Island)
- Genre: Indie folk
- Length: 42:20
- Label: Washington Square
- Producer: The Low Anthem

The Low Anthem chronology
Smart Flesh (2011)	eyeland (2016)	The Salt Doll Went to Measure the Depth of the Sea (2018)

eyeland is the fourth full-length studio concept album by American indie folk band the Low Anthem, released on June 17, 2016 on Washington Square Records - an imprint of Razor & Tie, of Concord Bicycle Music.

== Recording ==
The album was recorded in Providence, Rhode Island's Columbus Theatre, over a four-year time span, in the band's own recording studio which they built during the recording and eventually named after the album, Eyeland Recording Studio. eyeland is a cerebral psych-kidnapping noir for Jorge Luis Borges, and features dense sound collage elements in the arrangements. Mastering engineer Bob Ludwig worked on the album. During the recording of Eyeland, the Low Anthem became involved with the plans to re-open the theater in 2012. The band were founding members of the Columbus Cooperative, which runs the theater's programming, such as concerts and film screenings.

== Tour and van accident ==
In July 2016, the Low Anthem were involved in a traffic accident after their tour van was run off the road outside of Washington D.C. Band members Ben Knox Miller, Florence Wallis, and Bryan Minto and the band's sound engineer and tour documentarian received minor injuries from the accident, while Jeff Prystowsky had a severe concussion and was hospitalized. The van and most of the band's instruments and gear were destroyed in the accident. The remainder of the tour was canceled following the accident.

The album was commissioned into a script for a play by Trinity Repertory Company that is currently in workshop for full-production in 2018.

== Reception ==
The review aggregator website Metacritic gave eyeland a generally favorable rating of 67 out of 100 based on 11 independent music critic reviews.

The Line of Best Fit, a prominent UK blogger, rated it 8.5 and said, "The Low Anthem's eyeland is a triumph of forward thinking."

== Track listing ==
1. "in eyeland" : 4:42
2. "her little cosmos" : 3:21
3. "the pepsi moon" : 3:41
4. "ozzie": 3:27
5. "waved the neon seaweed" : 4:35
6. "behind the airport mirror": 2:52
7. in the air hockey fire" : 4:54
8. "wzgddrmtnwrdz" : 4:10
9. "am i the dream or am i the dreamer" : 5:59
10. "dream killer": 2:57
11. "the circular ruins in euphio" : 2:14

== Personnel ==
The Low Anthem

- Ben Knox Miller
- Jeff Prystowsky
- Florence Grace Wallis
- Bryan Minto

Guest artists

- Tyler Osborne
- Jocie Adams
- Mike Irwin
- Andy Davis
- Chris Erway
