= Columbus Theatre =

Columbus Theatre may refer to:

- Columbus Theatre (New York City)
- Columbus Theatre (Providence, Rhode Island)
- Teatro Colón, English language name for this Argentine opera house
