= Oh My God, Charlie Darwin =

2008 studio album by the Low Anthem

- 2009 reissue cover

Studio album by the Low Anthem
- Released: September 2, 2008
- Recorded: January 1–10, 2008
- Studios: Block Island, Rhode Island (Note: Temporary recording studio in a basement in Block Island. Additional recording at: Adorea Recording Studio in Hamden, Connecticut; Oestern Studio in Williamsburg, New York; Jesse Lauter's apartment in Harlem, New York)
- Genre: Americana
- Length: 41:56
- Label: Self-published
- Producers: Jesse Lauter; The Low Anthem

The Low Anthem chronology
What the Crow Brings (2007)	Oh My God, Charlie Darwin (2008)	Smart Flesh (2011)

Singles from Oh My God, Charlie Darwin
- 1. "Charlie Darwin" Released: September 28, 2009; 2. "To the Ghosts Who Write History Books" Released: February 15, 2010

Oh My God, Charlie Darwin is the third studio album by American band the Low Anthem. It was self-published on September 2, 2008, and reissued by Bella Union and Nonesuch Records in June 2009. Following the success of their album What the Crow Brings (2007), founding members Ben Knox Miller and Jeffrey Prystowsky welcomed Jocie Adams to the band. They were inspired by the confidence and romanticism of John Steinbeck's novels, and found tension between the human requirement of comfort and Charles Darwin's bleak theories of Darwinism, using his theory of natural selection as a framework to consider academics, politics, and religion. The album is named after Darwin, as the group considered how jarring his "survival of the fittest" theory would seem to a person of faith.

The album was recorded in the first ten days of 2008 in a basement in Block Island, Rhode Island, which was transformed into a temporary recording studio. The band enlisted Jesse Lauter to co-produce the album. The Americana sound is accompanied by several other genres, such as blues, country, folk, gospel, and R&B. It opens with quiet songs in Miller's falsetto and modal voice, followed by louder and chaotic tracks, before returning to more solemn music. The album incorporates at least 27 instruments, including crotales, pump organ, and zither. Some songs evolved extensively during recording, with several different approaches to tempo and instrumentation. The album consists of twelve tracks, one of which is a cover of a Tom Waits song written by Jack Kerouac.

The album was supported by two singles: "Charlie Darwin" in September 2009, and "To the Ghosts Who Write History Books" in February 2010. The Low Anthem toured North America and Europe after the album's release. Word-of-mouth support boosted its popularity; it charted in Belgium, the Netherlands, and the United Kingdom, and sold 75,000 copies worldwide. Critics praised Oh My God, Charlie Darwin for its lyrics, themes, and vocals but a few questioned the necessity and intensity of the louder songs. At the Boston Music Awards, the Low Anthem and Oh My God, Charlie Darwin won Best New Act and Album of the Year, respectively. Various publications listed it as one of the best albums of the year.

== Background and writing ==
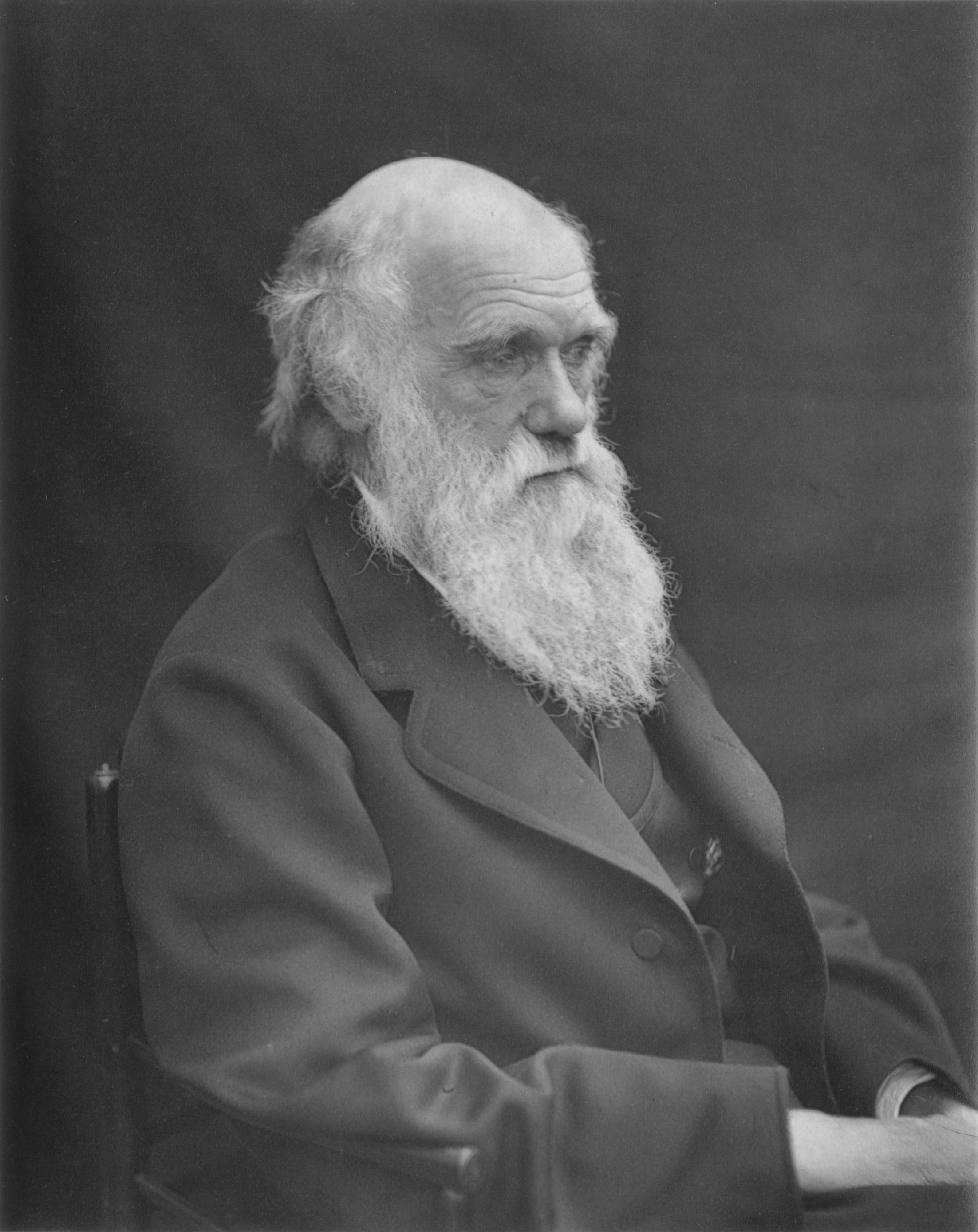
The album is named after Charles Darwin, whose theories influenced the lyrics and themes.

The Low Anthem founding members Ben Knox Miller and Jeffrey Prystowsky felt ambitious after the success of their second studio album, What the Crow Brings (2007), which sold over 10,000 copies. In November 2007, they welcomed to the group Jocie Adams, a classical composer and former NASA technician who they knew from Brown University; she had been a fan since they started performing live. Miller realized they should take elements from their musical influences and blend them with more modern themes. At Miller's insistence, the band read John Steinbeck's East of Eden (1952) before working on the album, and re-read it while writing and recording, inspired by the confidence, beauty, and romanticism of Steinbeck's writing style; they taped the word timshel, featured prominently in East of Eden, above the control booth.

The name of the album, Oh My God, Charlie Darwin, occurred to the group while observing giraffes at the Roger Williams Park Zoo in their home town of Providence, Rhode Island. They discussed how jarring Charles Darwin's "survival of the fittest" theories would seem to a person of faith and kept repeating the phrase "Oh my God! Charlie Darwin!" to each other. The group realized the theme of Darwinism echoed throughout their previous work. While writing the songs, they identified a tension between humans seeking comfort and the "bleak" theory of Darwinism. They kept a copy of Darwin's On the Origin of Species (1859) around during production. Miller often used the theory of natural selection as a framework to consider academics, politics, and religion, and compared Darwin's genetics theories to the nature, development, and bequeathment of values and ethics. He found the album a recognition of religion—particularly Christianity—spreading its message as animals spread their genes. The group did not take sides between religion and Darwinism; Miller, who is not antireligious, felt the album was about both hope and hopelessness and described it as "a gospel record for scientists and social philosophers".

The songs had been written some time before recording. As the group's primary songwriter, Miller would approach the other members with lyrics and a melody and they would collaborate to create the arrangement. Some songs were arranged almost instantly while writing, whereas others evolved significantly during production. Miller viewed the album as a book, with each of the songs "leaning on each other", while producer Jesse Lauter wanted it to imitate a movie. Miller felt it had a "better live feel" than What the Crow Brings since the latter's basic production prohibited experimentation. While What the Crow Brings focused on quiet Americana music, Oh My God, Charlie Darwin added some variation such as rock and roll. Miller felt its tracks shared a more coherent theme.

== Recording and production ==
To record the album, the band and some friends traveled by ferry to Block Island, Rhode Island, where they transformed the basement of Miller's parents' house into a temporary recording studio. Eleven people lived together in isolation, which Miller felt led to friction and tension that improved the music, describing recording sessions as a "little failed utopia". He found the starkness and space of Block Island representative of the album; its population sits around 800 in the winter months. Lauter—then a student at the Clive Davis Department of Recorded Music—brought high-quality equipment from his classmates. Prystowsky appreciated Lauter's contributions as he was "a little less emotionally invested" than the band members, and Miller felt he pushed them further than they did. Recording began on January 1, 2008, and took ten days. The album uses at least 27 instruments, including banjo, crotales, harmonica, pump organ, and zither.

Additional recording took place at Adorea Recording Studio with Travis Bell in Hamden, Connecticut, and at Oestern Studio in Williamsburg, New York, followed by overdubs and recording at Lauter's apartment in Harlem, New York. The fiddle was played by Anna Williams and Cameron Orr on "The Horizon is a Beltway", and by Williams on "To Ohio (Reprise)". Graham Smith played the singing bowl on "Charlie Darwin". Lauter produced and engineered the album; Travis Bell provided some additional engineering. (Note: Travis Bell provided additional engineering for "Charlie Darwin", "Cage the Songbird", "Champion Angel", and "To the Ghosts Who Write History Books".) The album was mixed by Brian Taylor over seven days. For recording, the group used two microphone preamplifiers by PreSonus, connected through lightpipe to a Digi002 running Pro Tools. An Electro-Voice RE20 was used to record vocals, connected to a Universal Audio preamplifier. "To Ohio" and "Cage the Songbird" use a portable pump organ by Estey Organ.

The tracks underwent several iterations. After 40 takes of "Charlie Darwin", the band realized they could extensively change the song, and it took from 60 to over 100 takes to finalize; Miller recalled the 85th take was the best. "Cage the Songbird" and "Charlie Darwin" were among the final songs recorded; the band attempted several approaches to tempo and instrumentation but eventually settled on raising the vocals an octave to give a choral quality, and removing the drums from the latter song. "Home I'll Never Be" is a cover of Tom Waits's version of the song from Orphans: Brawlers, Bawlers & Bastards (2006), itself a cover of Jack Kerouac's "On the Road" from Jack Kerouac Reads On the Road (1999). The group did not intend to include the song, but found its inclusion necessary after performing it in one take during pre-production.

== Music and lyrics ==
=== Overview ===
While Oh My God, Charlie Darwin is largely considered Americana, it is sometimes referred to as indie folk, indie rock, or neofolk, and its music spans genres such as blues, country, folk, gospel, and R&B; Miller considered Americana "a very formless genre", comprising icons of American culture and contrasting artists like Elvis Presley, Tom Waits, and Neil Young, rather than associating it with folk music. The album invokes themes of redemption, apocalypse, life and death, love, and religion; it has been compared to works resulting from the Dust Bowl, with several antediluvian references, and considered an unintentional mirror of the economic woes of the United States and a loss of free debate during and after the presidency of George W. Bush. Miller said it is about "environmental decay and social de-evolution and the death of morality".

The album opens with quiet songs followed by louder and chaotic tracks, and closes with more solemn music—a deliberate contrast. Miller sings in falsetto in "Charlie Darwin" and modal voice in "To Ohio" and "Ticket Taker", before dropping to a lower range by "The Horizon is a Beltway". Bookending the album, "Charlie Darwin" and "To Ohio (Reprise)" respectively set and reiterate its eclectic tone with gentle music. Ed Miller of Drowned in Sound identified the track listing as a "tapestry of American iconography": the first settlers in "Charlie Darwin", Midwest in "To Ohio", the "hobo spirit" of "Home I'll Never Be", and "a wild romantic heart" overall. Several tracks were compared to the work of other artists: "Charlie Darwin" to Fleet Foxes, "Ticket Taker" to Leonard Cohen, and "The Horizon is a Beltway" to Waits, Bob Dylan, and the Pogues.

=== Songs ===
"Charlie Darwin"
The opening track, "Charlie Darwin", features Miller's falsetto voice, imitating chamber and choral music in a manner described as "haunting" and "breezy".

"Charlie Darwin" is musically minimalistic, featuring an acoustic guitar alongside Miller's falsetto and backing vocals by Prystowsky and Adams. Its lyrics juxtapose the hope of the Mayflower's voyage with the brutality of manifest destiny and the diseases it introduced to Native Americans. Aquarium Drunkard's Mik Davis observed the song "laments being on a voyage and how even the brightest promise can be dimmed by directionlessness". Paste's Josh Jackson viewed it an attack on society's application of Darwinism, while Uncut's Allan Jones said it "imagines a drowning world, returned to water, a few sodden souls cast adrift on a sea of sorrow". Stevie Chick of The Guardian described the song as "lachrymose and haunting", and John Fortunato of The Aquarian wrote "Miller's trembled quiver stirringly haunts stripped-down meditational ruminations". Miller compared it to chamber and choral music. PopMatters's D.M. Edwards found the vocals of "Charlie Darwin" and "To Ohio" gentle and "breezy ... melding together, floating away, and carrying warnings of decline". DIY's Erik Thompson felt the opening tracks set a tone of warmth and intimacy that carries the album.

"To Ohio" is about yearning for lost love and new scenery; Aspen Daily News's Jonathan Bastian described the melody as "regretful but reposed". The Aquarian's Fortunato likened the atmosphere of "To Ohio" and "(Don't) Tremble" to the works of Nick Drake, emphasized by the variety of instruments against Miller's "solitary grief-stricken hymnals"; Uncut's Jones compared the former to Paul Simon, and considered the latter a pledge of loyalty and hymn of reassurance. WXPN's Bruce Warren felt "To Ohio" showcased the band's "soft and tender side", and The Quietus's Tom Milway likened its imagery to a Steinbeck novel. Uncut's Jones noted "The Horizon is a Beltway" envisioned catastrophe in its images of burning skylines and rotting flesh. Miller wrote "(Don't) Tremble" for a former band member who was consistently insecure about his work.

"Ticket Taker" was described by The Aquarian's Fortunato as "poignant muzzle-voiced maunder" bedeviled by desperation and by Gigwise's Huw Jones as a love story recounting biblical floods. DIY's Thompson felt it alluded to the responsibility of guiding others through difficult lives; Aspen Daily News's Bastian considered it a "release" after the intensity of previous tracks, reinforced by the lack of lyrics on "Music Box". "Champion Angel" is the longest and loudest track, utilizing electric guitars, drums, and roaring vocals. The Aquarian's Fortunato considered it a reinterpretation of Delta blues, comparing it to the Black Keys, North Mississippi Allstars, and early Kings of Leon, while NME's Leonie Cooper compared it to Tom Petty. The Aquarian's Fortunato described "Cage the Songbird" as a threnody reminiscent of the Cowboy Junkies and the BBC's Jon Lusk identified a similarity to the lullaby "Hush, Little Baby" with its list of conditionals. Fortunato likened "OMGCD" to country and Western music like "Will the Circle Be Unbroken", while Leahey compared it to gospel music.

== Release ==
The Low Anthem self-published Oh My God, Charlie Darwin on September 2, 2008, hand-painting the first 2,000 covers and handmaking CDs to sell at shows. Adams created the band's website and email distribution to sell albums, which Prystowsky packaged and shipped. The album's popularity was attributed to word-of-mouth support; Miller compared its trajectory to the westward expansion of the United States in the late 19th century, and said the band was able to "make a living" by March 2009. The album sold 12,000 copies by early 2009, and 75,000 copies by February 2011; What the Crow Brings and Oh My God, Charlie Darwin sold a combined 100,000 copies by January 2018.

End of the Road Records published 500 limited edition seven-inch vinyl records of "Charlie Darwin" and two other songs (Note: The single also included "To Ohio" and "Home I'll Never Be".) for Darwin Day on February 12, 2009, the 200th anniversary of Darwin's birth, hand-painted by the band; production problems delayed the release to February 23. Oh My God, Charlie Darwin was reissued by Nonesuch Records in the United States on June 9, 2009, and by Bella Union in the United Kingdom on June 29; iTunes UK selected "To Ohio" as its Single of the Week. Bob Ludwig mastered the reissue, which featured an alternative cover art and track listing. The Low Anthem signed with Nonesuch in April 2009 as they respected its roster. The reissue was supported by two singles: "Charlie Darwin" on September 28, 2009, and "To the Ghosts Who Write History Books" on February 15, 2010. A limited edition version of "Charlie Darwin" was released as a seven-inch vinyl record with two additional tracks (Note: The B-side tracks are cover versions of Reverend Gary Davis's "Sally Where'd You Get Your Liquor From", and Blind Willie McTell's "Don't You Let Nobody Turn You Round". The songs were considered "staples" of the band's live performances; the former was previously unreleased, while the latter had only been available on iTunes.) on March 23, 2010.

Tom Jones covered "Charlie Darwin" for his 2012 album Spirit in the Room; he was charmed by the historical references to the Mayflower and added vocals from an English church choir. The original song was featured in the conclusion of "Charlie Darwin", the third episode of Rectify's second season in July 2014. The Low Anthem issued limited edition pressings of the album on vinyl for its tenth anniversary in 2019: Joyful Noise Recordings published 1,000 hand-numbered pressings in a jacket painted by the band alongside a flexi disc with two additional songs (Note: The flexi disc featured the song "Birds" and an alternative take of "To the Ghosts Who Write History Books".) and a digital version on November 15, and Dinked published 300 pressings in a screen-printed jacket on November 29. Robert Plant covered "Ticket Taker" for his 2025 album Saving Grace; he carried the song with him for some time, having found the Low Anthem's album "mesmerizing" and impactful.

== Promotion ==
The band partnered with manager Kate Landau—daughter of Bruce Springsteen's manager Jon Landau—in July 2008, having attended Brown University together. A music video for "Charlie Darwin" was released exclusively by Stereogum in October 2009; the stop-motion animated video was produced by Glenn Taunton and Simon Taffe in a studio in Sussex. The video's release was a culminating point for the marketing campaign; it was one of Stereogum's most commented-on videos. The Low Anthem performed songs from the album on the radio show Radcliffe & Maconie on September 30, 2009. They made their British television debut on November 20, 2009, performing "To Ohio" on Later... with Jools Holland, and their American debut on January 14, 2010, performing "Charlie Darwin" on Late Show with David Letterman. Landau had been talking to the production team of the latter for around eight months and felt the success of the "Charlie Darwin" music video secured their booking.

=== Touring ===
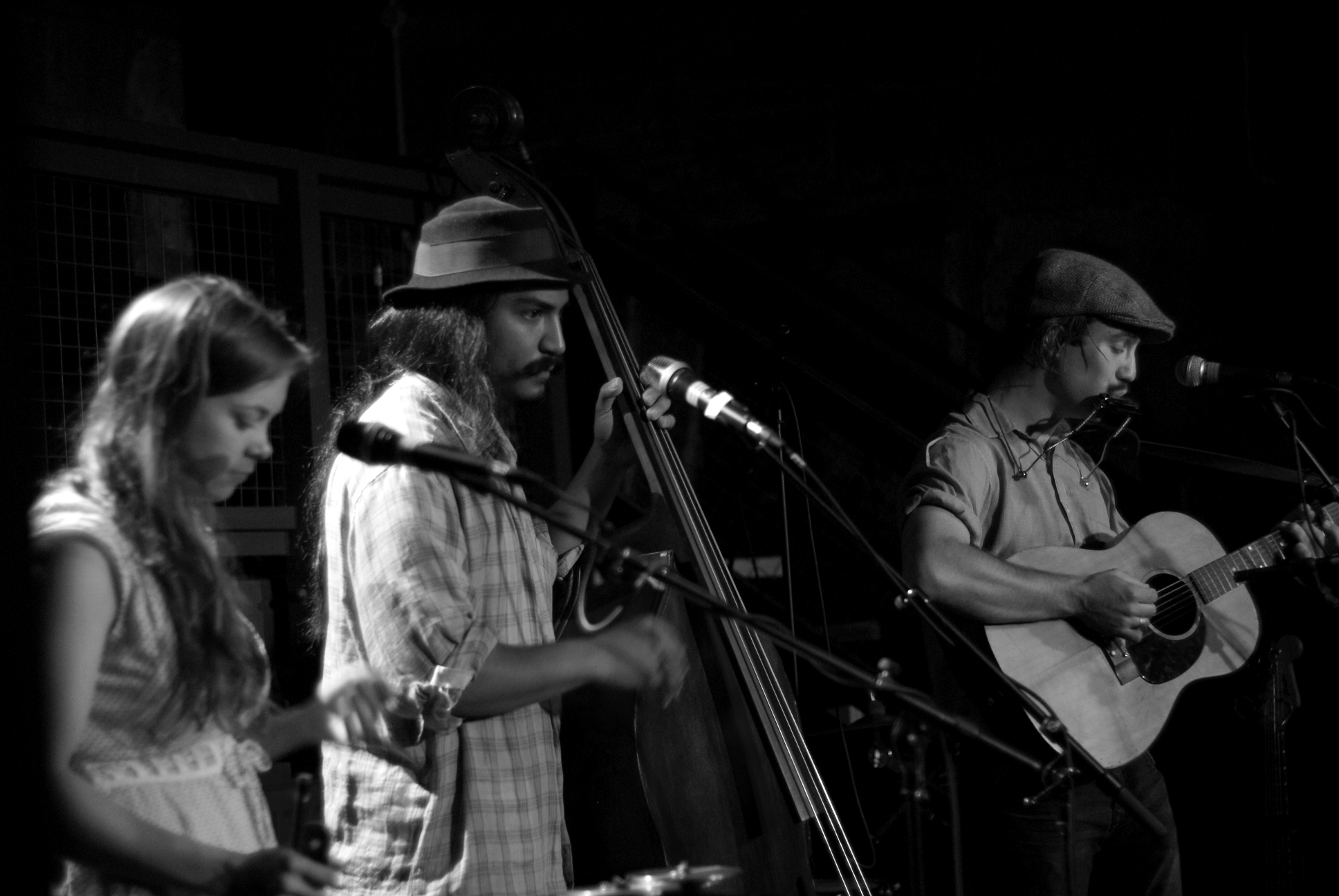
The Low Anthem (L to R: Adams, Prystowsky, Miller) performing at Cluny 2 in September 2009

The band celebrated the album's release with several performances in Rhode Island, Connecticut, and Massachusetts in September 2008. They toured 30 locations in the United States after the release in 2008 and 2009, including appearances at the Bonnaroo Music Festival, Falcon Ridge Folk Festival, and South by Southwest, joining performers such as Ray LaMontagne, Joe Pug, and Josh Ritter. Following their signing with Nonesuch, they debuted in Europe in May 2009, touring in France, Ireland, the Netherlands, and the United Kingdom, and spent five months touring between Europe and the United States, including at the Glastonbury Festival in June and Lollapalooza in August.

Following a month-long European stint in September, the band added 21 locations to their American tour in October and November—including their West Coast debut—and ended the year with two London shows in November. In January 2010, they performed at the Abrons Arts Center, and for NPR Music's Mountain Stage and Tiny Desk Concerts. They toured 13 European shows in January and February, followed by a ten-city North American tour with the Avett Brothers in February and March. To support the album, the band began their first headline tour on March 11 in Washington, D.C., followed by several shows across North America in March and April, including South by Southwest. They played several festivals in Europe and the United States from July to September, including Electric Picnic, Haldern Pop, Newport Folk Festival, and Summer Sundae. The band toured Europe and the United States in 2019 to celebrate the album's tenth anniversary reissue.

== Critical reception ==
Professional ratings
Aggregate scores
Source	Rating
AnyDecentMusic?	6.8/10
Metacritic	80/100
Review scores
Source	Rating
The Australian	4/5 stars
The A.V. Club	B
Drowned in Sound	8/10
The Guardian	4/5 stars
The Irish Times	4/5 stars
The Line of Best Fit	78%
Paste	9/10
PopMatters	8/10
Rolling Stone	3/5 stars
Uncut	4/5 stars

Oh My God, Charlie Darwin received positive reviews from critics. Review aggregator Metacritic assigned an average review score of 80 out of 100, indicating "generally favorable reviews", based on 18 critics, and AnyDecentMusic? assigned a score of 6.8/10 based on 10 reviews. The album was described by Paste's Jackson as "exquisite", noting "it stopped us in our tracks the first time we heard it", and by NME's Leonie Cooper as a "welcome addition to the intricate patchwork quilt of the new wave of Americana"; Ottawa Citizen's Stuart Derdeyn found the group unique within a debased genre. PopMatters's Edwards called the album "nuanced, prescient, melodic, and stirring". MusicOMH's Darren Lee considered it among the best albums of the first half of 2009.

The instrumentation, production value, and variety of genres received praise; Gigwise's Jones described the album as "an agnostic mix of startling beauty and haunting comment". The Australian's Iain Shedden commended the band's ability to handle different genres and themes, which The Austin Chronicle's Doug Freeman felt was emphasized by the track sequencing. He wrote the album accomplishes "the balance of apocalypse and subtlety" unachievable by others artists. The writing and Miller's vocals were similarly praised. The Boston Globe's Jonathan Perry lauded the exploration of themes, and Drowned in Sound's Miller wrote the album had the potential to fail but its consistent quality, philosophical lyrics, and experimental music made it compelling. The Observer's Killian Fox praised the writing but considered the music "only sporadically engaging".

"Charlie Darwin" was frequently cited as the album's standout by critics; MusicOMH's Lee considered it among the year's best songs "with its ability to send a chill down the spine", and Fort Worth Star-Telegram's Preston Jones felt Miller's vocals anchored the track but the album was unable to recapture its power. Uncut's Jones found "Ticket Taker" the standout but the reprise of "To Ohio" superfluous due to the original's perfection—the only misjudgment on a nearly perfect album; conversely, The Sunday Times's Mark Edwards regarded the reprise demonstrative of the band's ability in that they can rework even their own music. Rolling Stone's Christian Hoard criticized some lyrics of "Charlie Darwin" but praised "Cage the Songbird" and "The Horizon is a Beltway" as the album's best. The Quietus's Milway found the tracks "dull and fictional"—except "Charlie Darwin" and "To Ohio"—and criticized the uninteresting lyrics, imitation of existing music, superfluous instruments, and lack of falsetto after the opening track.

Several reviewers enjoyed the quiet, sombre tracks more than the upbeat, louder songs; Evening Standard's Pete Clark thought they complemented each other, but Jon Pareles of The New York Times found the louder songs emulated Tom Waits too closely. The Irish Times's Lauren Murphy felt both styles were cleverly connected by poetic lyrics but noted a preference for the quieter moments. Steven Hyden of The A.V. Club praised the intimacy of songs like "(Don't) Tremble" but wanted more upbeat tracks like "Champion Angel". Conversely, The Line of Best Fit's Simon Tyers found "Champion Angel" too unfamiliar and detracted from the slow burn. Hot Press's Edwin McFee wrote the album "succeeds because of its sincerity" but considered tracks like "The Horizon is a Beltway" unnecessary; BBC's Lusk cited it as the only weakness due to its interruption of the quiet opening tracks, but otherwise felt the album surpasses its influences through lyrical imagery and strong melodies.

== Charts and accolades ==
Oh My God, Charlie Darwin charted in Belgium for eleven weeks from July to September 2009, peaking at 32nd in the second week, and it charted 89th in the Netherlands in July and 76th on the Albums Chart in the United Kingdom in September. "Charlie Darwin" peaked at 82nd on the UK's Physical Singles Chart after two weeks in October. The Low Anthem won Best New Act at the 21st Boston Music Awards in December 2008. At the 22nd Boston Music Awards the following year, Oh My God, Charlie Darwin won Album of the Year, while the Low Anthem and "The Horizon is a Beltway" were nominated for Act of the Year and Best Song of the Year, respectively.

The album was voted Best Album in The Providence Phoenix in 2009, and the Low Anthem placed third for the Uncut Music Award in 2009. Oh My God, Charlie Darwin was ranked 18th on Paste's list of 2008 albums, and WFUV's Vin Scelsa listed among his favorite albums of the year. Following its reissue, it appeared on multiple publications' and personalities' year-end lists of 2009, including Magnet (1st), HUMO (2nd), Ottawa Citizen (3rd), Brattleboro Reformer (4th), Paste (4th), Steve McCoy (5th), Billings Gazette (9th), Mojo (12th), The Huffington Post (tied 17th), Uncut (21st), Q (22nd), MusicOMH (30th), The Guardian (41st), WOXY.com (97th), Boston Herald, and The Independent.

== Track listing ==
Oh My God, Charlie Darwin – 2008 release
No.	Title	Writer(s)	Length
1.	"Charlie Darwin"	Benjamin Knox Miller, Jeffrey Carl Prystowsky	4:32
2.	"To Ohio"	Miller, Prystowsky	3:19
3.	"The Horizon is a Beltway"	Miller, Prystowsky	2:51
4.	"Home I'll Never Be"	Jack Kerouac, Thomas Waits	2:51
5.	"Ticket Taker"	Miller, Prystowsky	3:07
6.	"To the Ghosts Who Write History Books"	Miller, Prystowsky	3:29
7.	"(Don't) Tremble"	Miller, Jocelyn Jager Adams	4:39
8.	"Music Box"	Miller, Adams	1:51
9.	"Champion Angel"	Miller, Prystowsky	5:34
10.	"Cage the Songbird"	Miller, Prystowsky	4:03
11.	"OMGCD"	Miller, Prystowsky	2:08
12.	"To Ohio (Reprise)"	Miller, Prystowsky	3:40
Total length:			41:56

Oh My God, Charlie Darwin – 2009 reissue
No.	Title	Writer(s)	Length
1.	"Charlie Darwin"	Miller, Prystowsky	4:33
2.	"To Ohio"	Miller, Prystowsky	3:19
3.	"Ticket Taker"	Miller, Prystowsky	3:08
4.	"The Horizon is a Beltway"	Miller, Prystowsky	2:51
5.	"Home I'll Never Be"	Kerouac, Waits	2:50
6.	"Cage the Songbird"	Miller, Prystowsky	4:03
7.	"(Don't) Tremble"	Miller, Adams	4:39
8.	"Music Box"	Miller, Adams	1:52
9.	"Champion Angel"	Miller, Prystowsky	5:34
10.	"To the Ghosts Who Write History Books"	Miller, Prystowsky	3:31
11.	"OMGCD"	Miller, Prystowsky	2:04
12.	"To Ohio (Reprise)"	Miller, Prystowsky	3:42
Total length:			42:06

Oh My God, Charlie Darwin – 10th Anniversary Edition (Joyful Noise Recordings) Side A
No.	Title	Writer(s)	Length
1.	"Charlie Darwin"	Miller, Prystowsky	4:33
2.	"To Ohio"	Miller, Prystowsky	3:19
3.	"The Horizon is a Beltway"	Miller, Prystowsky	2:51
4.	"Home I'll Never Be"	Kerouac, Waits	2:50
5.	"Ticket Taker"	Miller, Prystowsky	3:08
6.	"To the Ghosts Who Write History Books"	Miller, Prystowsky	3:31

Side B
No.	Title	Writer(s)	Length
7.	"(Don't) Tremble"	Miller, Adams	4:39
8.	"Music Box"	Miller, Adams	1:52
9.	"Champion Angel"	Miller, Prystowsky	5:34
10.	"Cage the Songbird"	Miller, Prystowsky	4:03
11.	"OMGCD"	Miller, Prystowsky	2:04
12.	"To Ohio (Reprise)"	Miller, Prystowsky	3:42

Bonus disc
No.	Title	Writer(s)	Length
13.	"Birds"		0:46
14.	"To the Ghosts Who Write History Books (Alt. Take 1.27.08 JML)"	Miller, Prystowsky	2:52
Total length:			45:39
