= What the Crow Brings =

What The Crow Brings

Studio album by The Low Anthem
- Released: 21 September 2007
- Recorded: Providence, Rhode Island
- Genre: Indie folk
- Length: 46:54
- Label: Self-release
- Producer: The Low Anthem

The Low Anthem chronology
| The Low Anthem (2006) | What The Crow Brings (2007) | Oh My God, Charlie Darwin (2008) |

What The Crow Brings is the first full-length studio album by American indie folk band the Low Anthem, self-released on September 21, 2007. With the release of this album the band embraced a full-fledged DIY ideology; writing, recording, mixing, and even painting and silk screening the record jackets from their Providence, Rhode Island, apartment.

== Track listing ==
1. "The Ballad of the Broken Bones" - 3:58
2. "Yellowed by the Sun" - 3:26
3. "As the Flame Burns Down" - 4:58
4. "Bless Your Tombstone Heart" - 4:05
5. "This God Damn House" - 3:38
6. "A Weary Horse Can Hide the Pain" - 4:15
7. "Scavenger Bird" - 4:46
8. "Sawdust Saloon" - 7:04
9. "Keep on the Sunny Side" - 3:09
10. "Senorita" - 4:33
11. "Coal Mountain Lullaby" - 3:02
