= Oresto DiSaia =

American architect

- Born: January 22, 1900; Providence, Rhode Island
- Died: March 28, 1976 (aged 76); Providence, Rhode Island
- Occupation: Architect

Oresto DiSaia (1900–1976) was an Italian-American architect from Providence, Rhode Island. He was well known as an architect of large churches, theatres and other buildings.

== Life and career ==
Oresto DiSaia was born January 22, 1900, in Providence, Rhode Island to Costanzo and Carmela (DePaola) DiSaia, recent Italian immigrants from Frosolone and Riccia, respectively. He was educated in the Providence public schools, but did not attend college. After his 1917 graduation he joined the firm of F. P. Sheldon & Son, mill architects and engineers. With the exception of a brief period with the Construction Division of the War Department in Washington, DC during World War I, DiSaia remained with the Sheldons until 1924, when he established his own practice. DiSaia practiced alone for most of his career, but became associated with his two sons late in life. After his death, they operated the practice as DiSaia Associates.

In 1946 DiSaia was appointed state Director of Public Works by Governor John O. Pastore. He served until his resignation in 1948. In 1950 he was chair of the Legislative Commission on Highway Planning, and in 1973 he was appointed to the Building Codes Standards Committee by Governor Philip W. Noel.

DiSaia joined the American Institute of Architects in 1931. He was a member for the rest of his life, excluding the years 1933 to 1937. At one time or another he held every office in the Rhode Island chapter, including president.

== Personal life ==
DiSaia was married to Eleanor Rossi, with whom he had two sons and two daughters. They lived in a house at 481 Pleasant Valley Parkway in Providence, circa 1955. His sons, Kenneth A. (1925–2009) and Robert O. (1931–2012), would become associated in his business.

In addition to his professional associations, DiSaia was also a member of several fraternal organizations. He was a member and trustee of the R. C. Church of the Holy Ghost in Providence.

DiSaia died March 28, 1976, in Providence.

== Architectural works ==
- Columbus Theatre, Providence, Rhode Island (1926)
- El Dorado Apartments, Providence, Rhode Island (1930)
- Hollywood Theatre, East Providence, Rhode Island (1931, demolished 2008)
- President's House, University of Rhode Island, Kingston, Rhode Island (1931)
- Metropolitan Theatre, Providence, Rhode Island (1932, demolished 1961)
- Jonathan Arnold and Welcome Arnold Buildings, John O. Pastore Center, Cranston, Rhode Island (1936)
- Hangar No. 1, Rhode Island T. F. Green International Airport, Warwick, Rhode Island (1937–38 and 1953, demolished 2013)
- Johnston Town Hall, Johnston, Rhode Island (1938–39)
- Aquinas Hall, Providence College, Providence, Rhode Island (1939–40)
- Marcello Freezing Storage Warehouse, Providence, Rhode Island (1947, demolished)
- Columbus National Bank Building, Providence, Rhode Island (1949)
- Veterans Memorial Auditorium, Providence, Rhode Island (1949–51)
- Keaney Gymnasium, University of Rhode Island, Kingston, Rhode Island (1950–53)
- St. Rocco R. C. Church, Johnston, Rhode Island (1951)
- Kaiser-Frazer Showroom, Providence, Rhode Island (1952)
- Marconi Memorial, (Note: Begun in 1937, but the incomplete pieces were placed into storage after the outbreak of World War II. Construction resumed several years after the war.) Roger Williams Park, Providence, Rhode Island (1953)
- St. Pius V R. C. Church, Providence, Rhode Island (1960–62)
- St. Augustine R. C. Church, Providence, Rhode Island (1962)
- R. C. Church of the Immaculate Conception, Cranston, Rhode Island (1964–66)
- Remodeling of Our Lady of Mount Carmel R. C. Church, Bristol, Rhode Island (1971)

== Gallery of architectural works ==
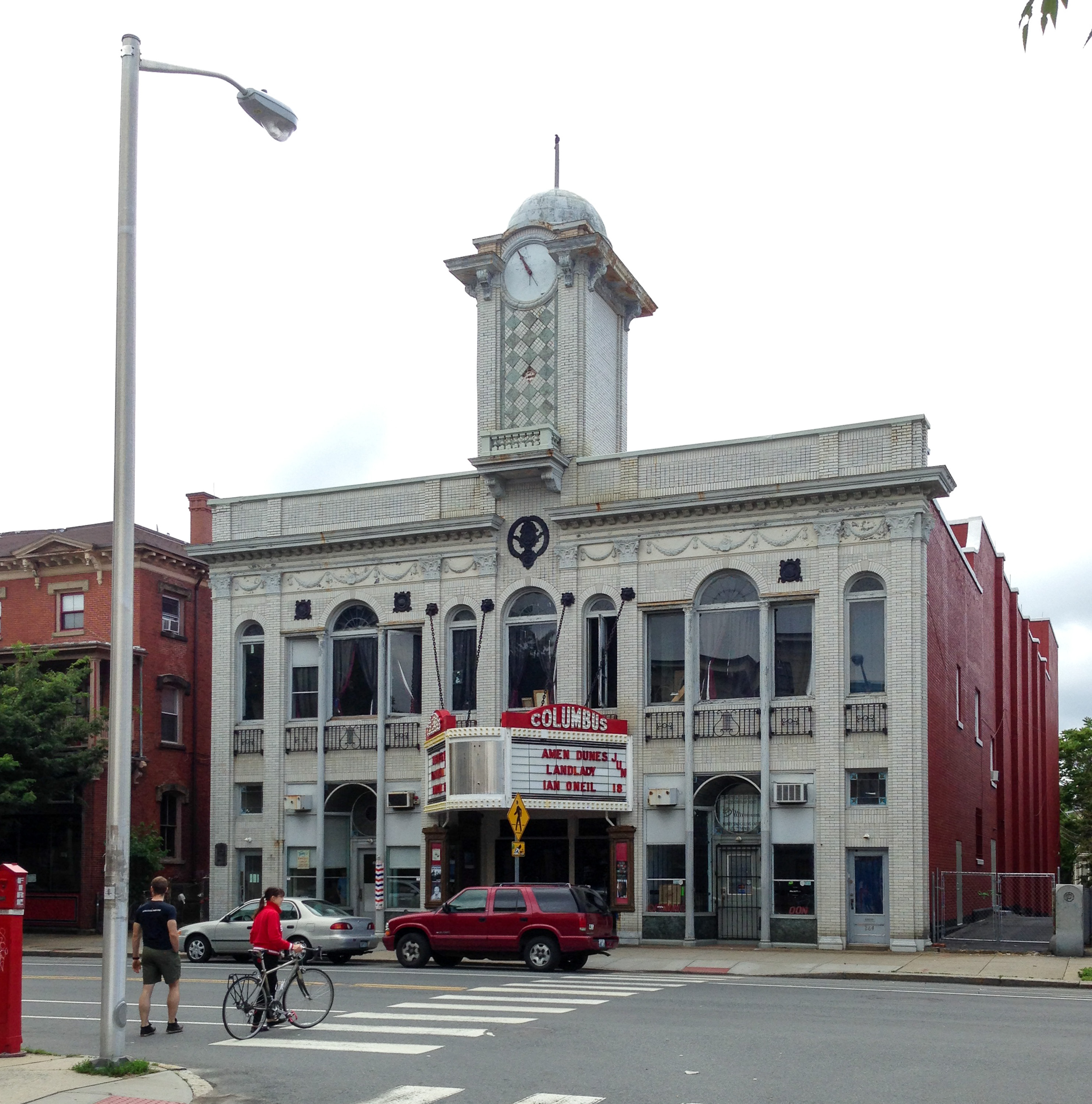
Columbus Theatre, Providence, Rhode Island, 1926.

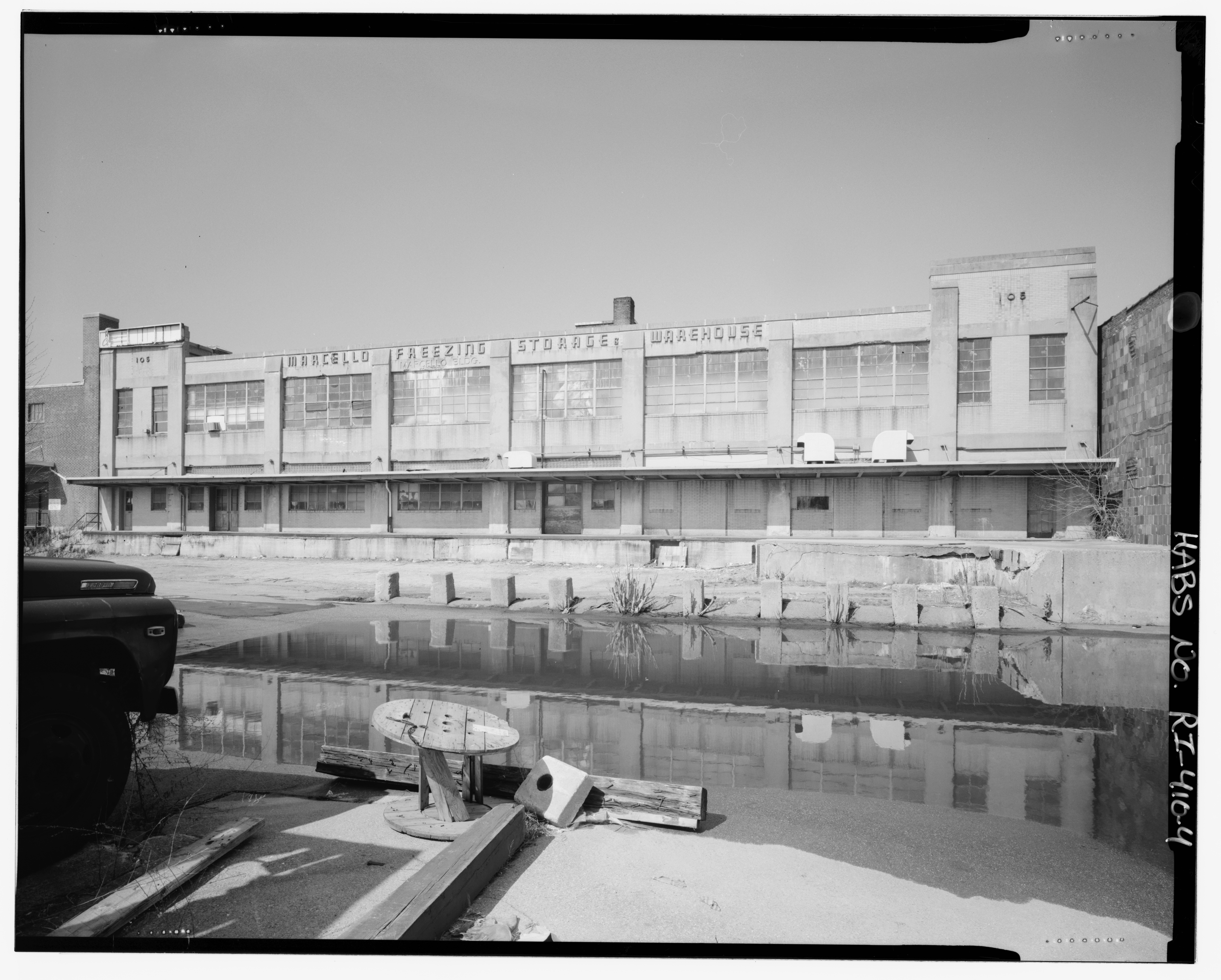
Marcello Freezing Storage Warehouse, Providence, Rhode Island, 1947.

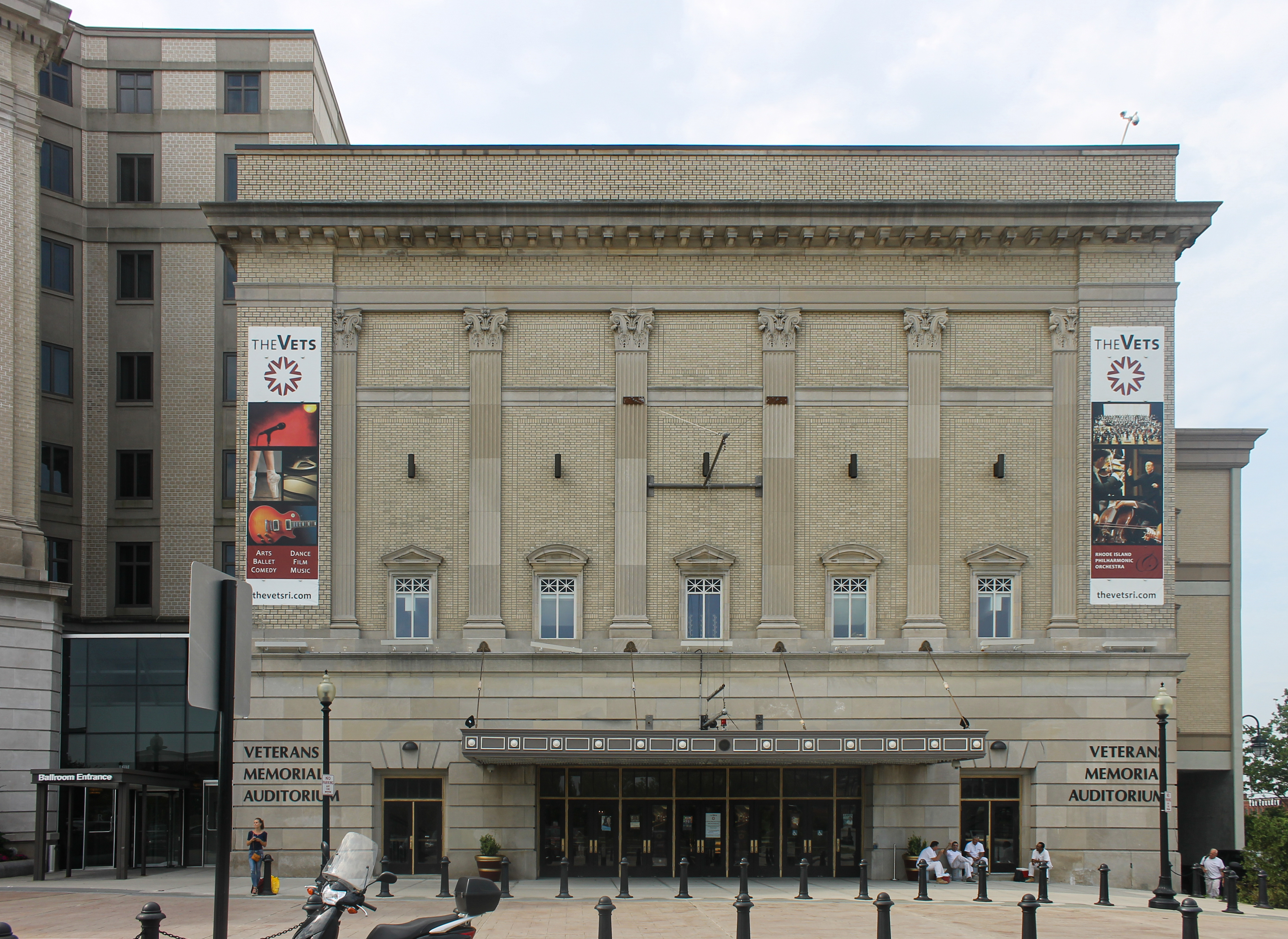
Veterans Memorial Auditorium, Providence, Rhode Island, 1949-51.

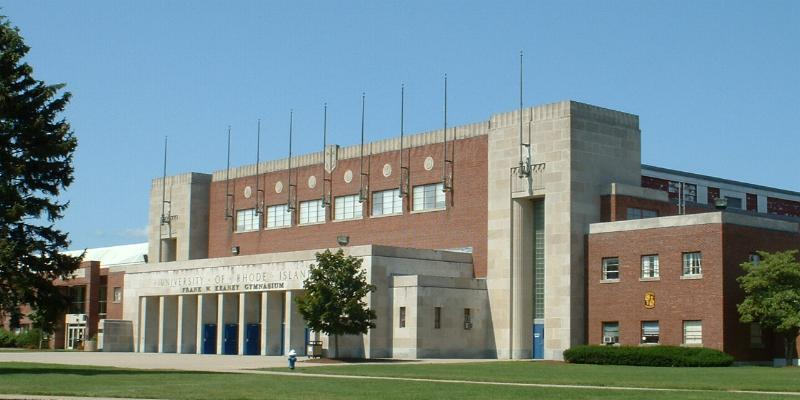
Keaney Gymnasium, University of Rhode Island, Kingston, Rhode Island, 1950-53.

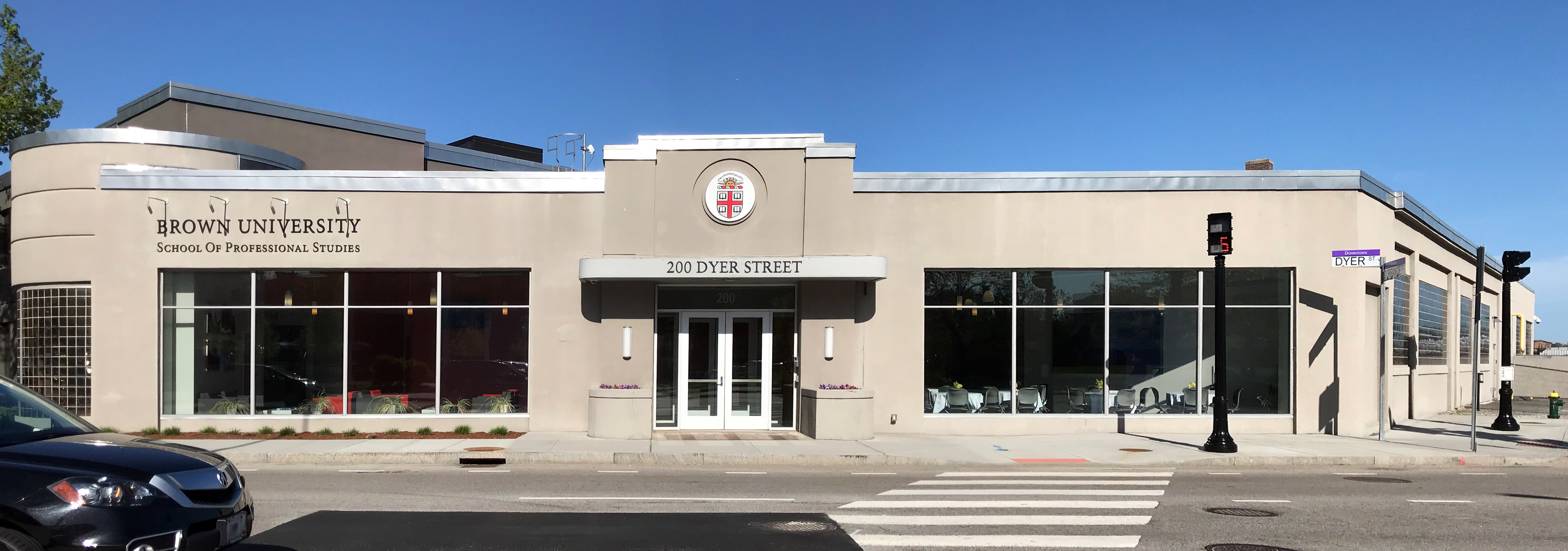
Kaiser-Frazer Showroom, Providence, Rhode Island, 1952.

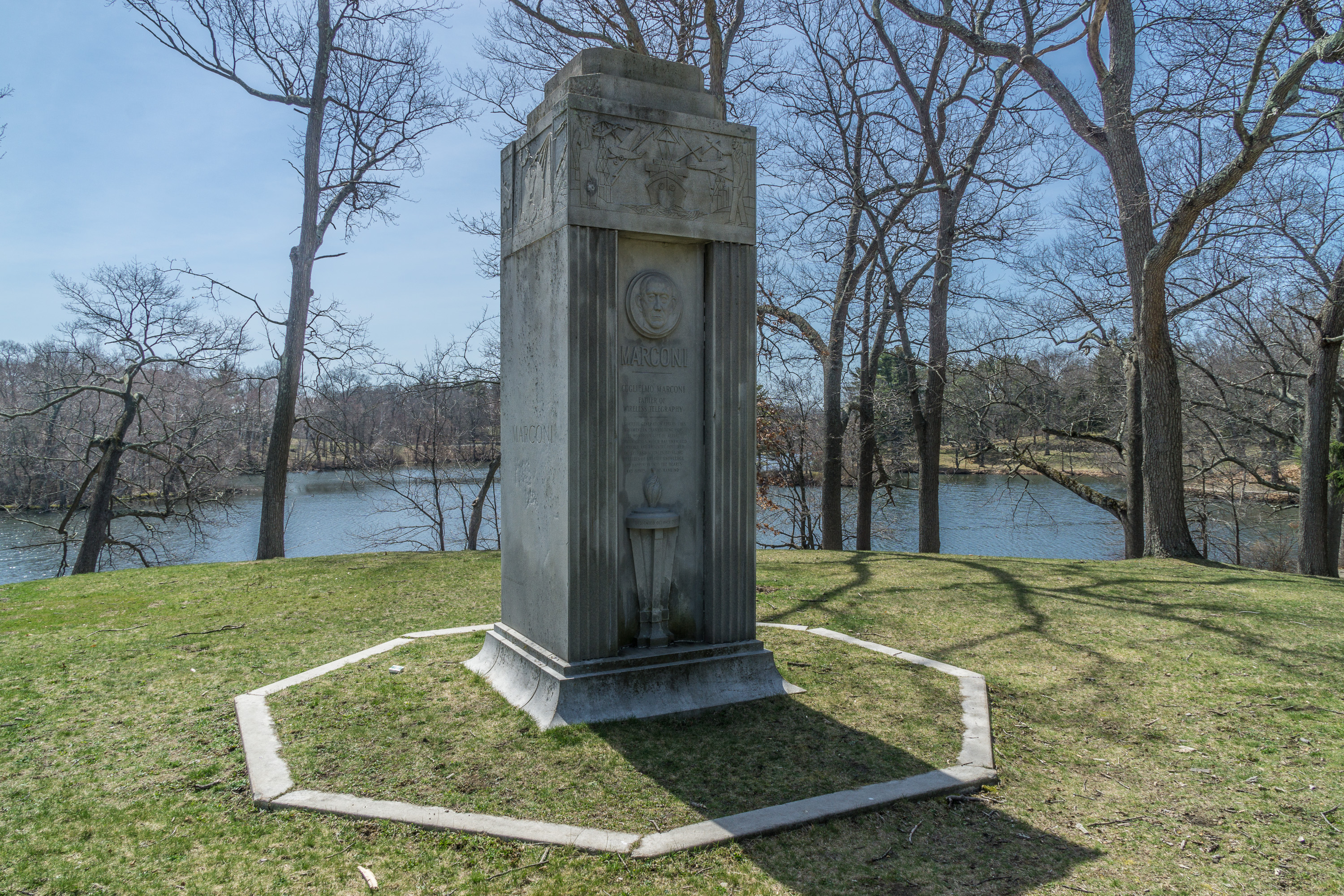
Marconi Memorial, Roger Williams Park, Providence, Rhode Island, 1953.

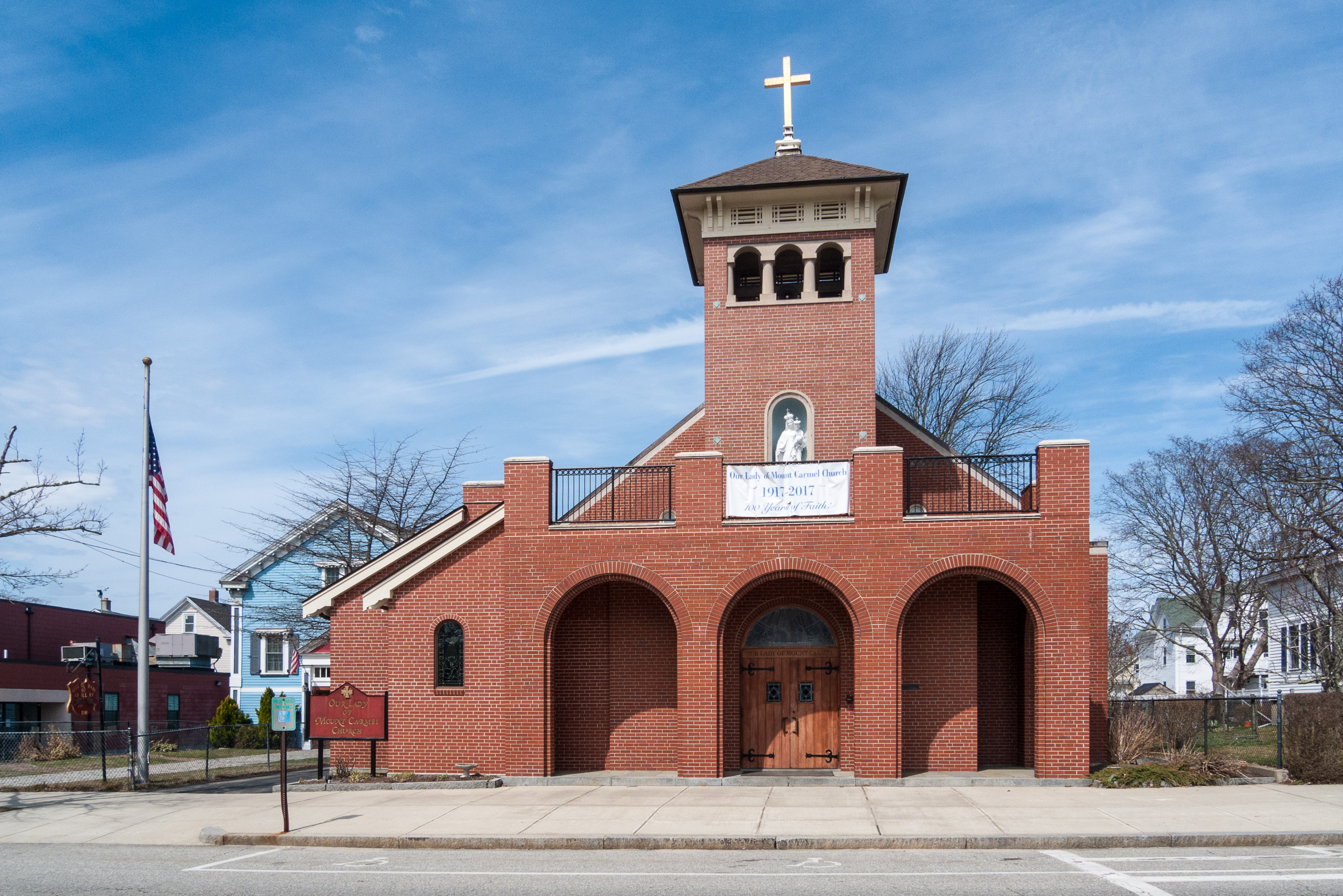
Remodeling of Our Lady of Mount Carmel R. C. Church, Bristol, Rhode Island, 1971.
