= Smart Flesh =

Studio album by the Low Anthem
- Released: 22 February 2011
- Genre: indie folk
- Length: 46:13
- Label: Bella Union (UK); Nonesuch (US)
- Producer: The Low Anthem

The Low Anthem chronology
Oh My God, Charlie Darwin (2008)	Smart Flesh (2011)	Eyeland (2016)

Smart Flesh is the third studio album by American indie folk band the Low Anthem, released on February 22, 2011 on Bella Union in UK/Europe and Nonesuch Records in US. The majority of the album was recorded in an abandoned pasta sauce factory in Central Falls, Rhode Island, near the band's hometown of Providence, Rhode Island. Smart Flesh is the only album to feature multi-instrumentalist Mat Davidson, who left the band during the album's promotional tour.

A numbered, letterpress printed version of the album was issued upon release, containing an additional disc with three "passable strays that missed the cut." The bonus track, "Dreams Can Chase You Down", is written by former member Dan Lefkowitz.

== Background and recording ==
After extensive touring in support of the band's previous album, Oh My God, Charlie Darwin, the band set up a recording studio in an abandoned pasta sauce factory, in their hometown, Providence, Rhode Island. Jeff Prystowsky states that the band "set out to make a record in a natural space, [...] a building that has its own kind of reverb, its own sound, a unique sound that we find beautiful."

The band stayed in the factory together for three months, with Prystowsky stating that "it wasn't cushy at all." Ben Knox Miller noted that: "Obviously, there were personal tensions, you know? When you do anything intensely over a long period of time... it was like 3 months we were living in that place. This little place, as a family unit, whatever you want to call it. But yeah, we didn't picture that it would be that cold."

The environment of the factory ultimately dictated the album's overall aesthetic, with the band using different metals, woods and artifacts as percussive instruments. Prystowsky also notes that the album's emphasis on quieter songs is as a result of the recording space: "It just sounded muddy when you tried to play rowdy songs. It's not an acoustically treated room, and [if] you get a lot of drums and electric guitar, [then] everything is muddy and you can't hear the divisions, the timbres of the instruments. It had that kind of effect with some of those kinds of songs when we tried to play them in the factory building." Prior to the album's release, Miller remarked that "a lot of songs died in that space that would have flourished elsewhere, for musical reasons more so than lyrical reasons."

According to Miller and Prystowsky, the band recorded around thirty songs in the factory. The unreleased tracks are currently being considered for release under an "alter-ego" band, Snake Wagon.

Following the recording sessions, the band travelled to Omaha to mix the tracks with Mike Mogis, of Bright Eyes fame. Miller described the man as "a genius. He's like the man with the Midas touch."

The band subsequently returned to the pasta sauce factory for the album's launch gig, in March 2011.

== Track listing ==
All songs written by The Low Anthem except where noted.

1. "Ghost Woman Blues" (George Carter)
2. "Apothecary Love"
3. "Boeing 737"
4. "Love and Altar"
5. "Matter of Time"
6. "Wire" (Jocie Adams)
7. "Burn"
8. "Hey, All You Hippies!"
9. "I'll Take Out Your Ashes"
10. "Golden Cattle"
11. "Smart Flesh"

=== Limited Edition bonus disc ===
1. "Maybe So"
2. "Vines"
3. "Dreams Can Chase You Down" (Dan Lefkowitz)
4. "Daniel In the Lion's Den"

== Personnel ==
=== The Low Anthem ===
- Ben Knox Miller
- Jeff Prystowsky
- Jocie Adams
- Mat Davidson

=== Additional musicians ===
- Ben Pilgrim - harmonium ("Smart Flesh")
- Anton Patzner - violin ("Boeing 737")
- Louis Patzner - cello ("Boeing 737")
- Robert Houllahan - flickering film ("Boeing 737")

=== Production personnel ===
- The Low Anthem - producer
- Jesse Lautner - recording, mixing ("Matter of Time", "Burn" and "Hey, All You Hippies!")
- Mike Mogis - mixing
- Dan Cardinal - recording ("Matter of Time", "Burn" and "Hey, All You Hippies!")
- Robert C. Ludwig - mastering

=== Artwork ===
- Alec Thibodeau - design
- Dan Wood - design
- DWRI Letterpress - printing
- Ryan Mastro - pasta sauce factory photographs
