= The Low Anthem (album) =

Studio album by The Low Anthem
- Released: May 9, 2006
- Genre: Indie folk
- Length: 54:46
- Label: Self-release
- Producer: John Paul Gauthier

The Low Anthem chronology
The Low Anthem (2006)	What The Crow Brings (2007)

The Low Anthem is the debut release by American indie folk band The Low Anthem, self-released in 2006. The album is currently out of print, and is noted for its varied instrumentation including saxophones, tabla drums, cellos, and organs combined with more traditional folk instruments.

== Track listing ==
1. "Burlington" - 5:49
2. "Lonely Dollar" - 3:12
3. "I Need You" - 5:33
4. "Military Planes" - 4:37
5. "Matchstick Rafters" - 4:30
6. "Bluebirds" - 3:23
7. "Running Weary" - 3:22
8. "Take Care Of Your Own" - 3:43
9. "Country Wine" - 2:32
10. "Don't Say No" - 4:40
11. "Monday's Rain" -4:33
12. "Southbound Train" - 8:53
