= Holy Ghost Church (Providence, Rhode Island) =

Church in Rhode Island, United States

Coordinates: 41.8239°N 71.4331°W

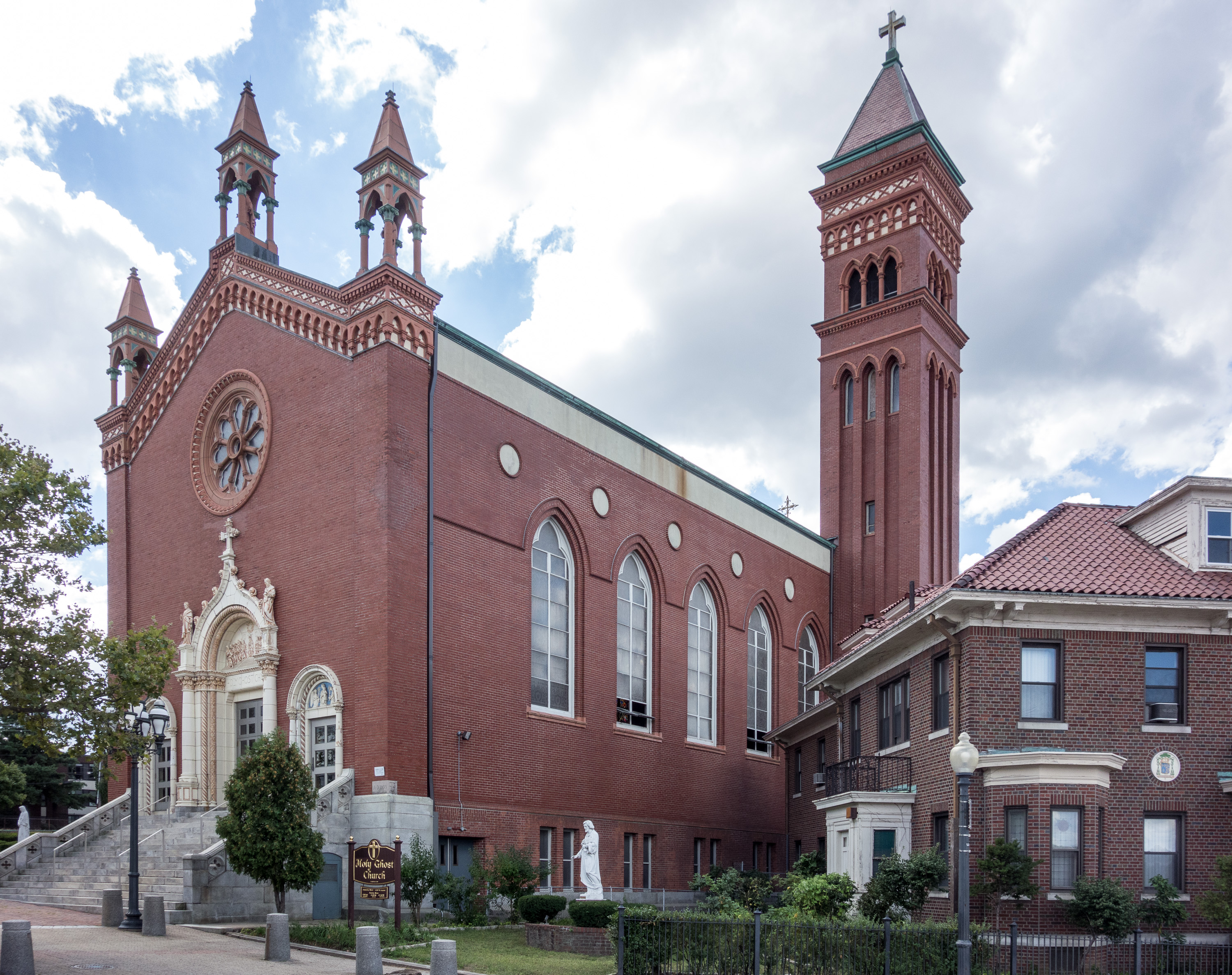
Holy Ghost Church

The Corporation of the Church of the Holy Ghost is located in the heart of Federal Hill, Providence, Rhode Island's "Little Italy". The church was established on September 22, 1889 by the Missionaries of Saint Charles Borromeo to serve the spiritual needs of the new Italian immigrants at the turn of the 19th century. Father Luigi Paroli, CS obtained permission by Bishop Matthew Harkins of the Roman Catholic Diocese of Providence and was installed as the first pastor of the parish. Initially, the community of Italian worshipers were hosted in the basement of the Cathedral of Saints Peter and Paul (Providence, Rhode Island) before moving to Ivy Hall on Swiss Street in Providence. In 1901 the congregation grew too large for its current dwelling and a number of lots were purchased on the corner of Knight Street and Atwells Avenue at the west end of Federal Hill. A one level structure what today is the present church's basement served as the main place of worship for devotees until the triforium, edifice and campanile were constructed eight years later. On Pentecost Sunday, May 26, 1901 Blessed Giovanni Battista Scalabrini visited the parish on the feast day of its patron the Holy Ghost. On that day the founder of the Missionaries of St. Charles Borromeo celebrated multiple Masses and Confirmed nearly 1,200 Catholics that day.

== Church Architecture ==
The present church was completed in 1909, the architects were Murphy, Hindle & Wright. The redbrick structure is a done in the Italian Gothic style, particularly drawing from famed Basilicas of northern Italian regions. The facade is modeled after the Basilica of Santa Maria Gloriosa dei Frari in Venice and the bell tower after one of Italy's most celebrated landmarks, the campanile of Saint Mark's Basilicaon the canals of Venice. The edifice is adorned with limestone and terracotta inlays and sculptures. The center terracotta pediment sculpture and frame, above and around the church's main doors depicts the first Pentecost Sunday, the Virgin Mary at the center of the Apostles, seated below a dove depicting the Holy Spirit the sculpture is topped off with a cross and two mini statues on either side frame the image, Saint Peter and Saint Paul was imported form Florence in 1909. In 1928 the two side doors were added, each door surrounded by similar style terracotta pediment sculptures and frames, above the left door the Sacred Heart of Jesus and above the left the Madonna and Child. At the center of the facade is a magnificent rose window from 1909, its center depicts a dove, reinforcing the prevalence of the Holy Spirit for the parish. The three peaks of the edifice are each adorned with a mini cupola. The Sacred Heart of Jesus is in the center, and Saint Peter and Saint Paul are on either side, all in limestone.

== The Era of Father Flaminio Parenti ==
The 1920s would mark the beginning of the golden age for the parish. In 1922 Father Flaminio Parenti, CS was assigned as pastor. Parenti would serve the parish as pastor for about 50 years, under his reign there was immense success, a Parochial school and day care were established for children of the community and Italian background to be educated and reared in 1924, a new Italian Renaissance Revival style rectory was constructed adjacent to the church in 1926, from Ivy Hall operettas and cultural events were held, Italian films were screened, the parish's organizations and societies grew tremendously throughout the 1930s. The church building also endured major changes during the tenure of Father Parenti. Initially, two doors were added to the church facade and a grand staircase of Vermont granite was constructed in the mid 1920s. Later would come an interior beautification project. Father Parenti began commissioned artists to paint frescos over the drab white stucco and create niches and votives for statues and worshipers. Notable societies would be formed during this period that would greatly form the parish such as the Society of the Holy Name and Children of Mary Society. In 1939, in order of the parish's 50th golden jubilee, Father Parenti kickstarted a major fundraising campaign to renovate the churches interior. Marble was brought in from Carrara, Italy and installed throughout the church, primarily in the sanctuary. Additionally, golden mosaics were installed in the dome over the altar, and frescos were painted to amplify the spirituality of the dwelling, the project was headed by parish trustee and notable Italo-American architect, Oreste DiSaia.
