= Renaissance Providence Hotel =

- Masonic Temple; Providence, Rhode Island
- U.S. National Register of Historic Places
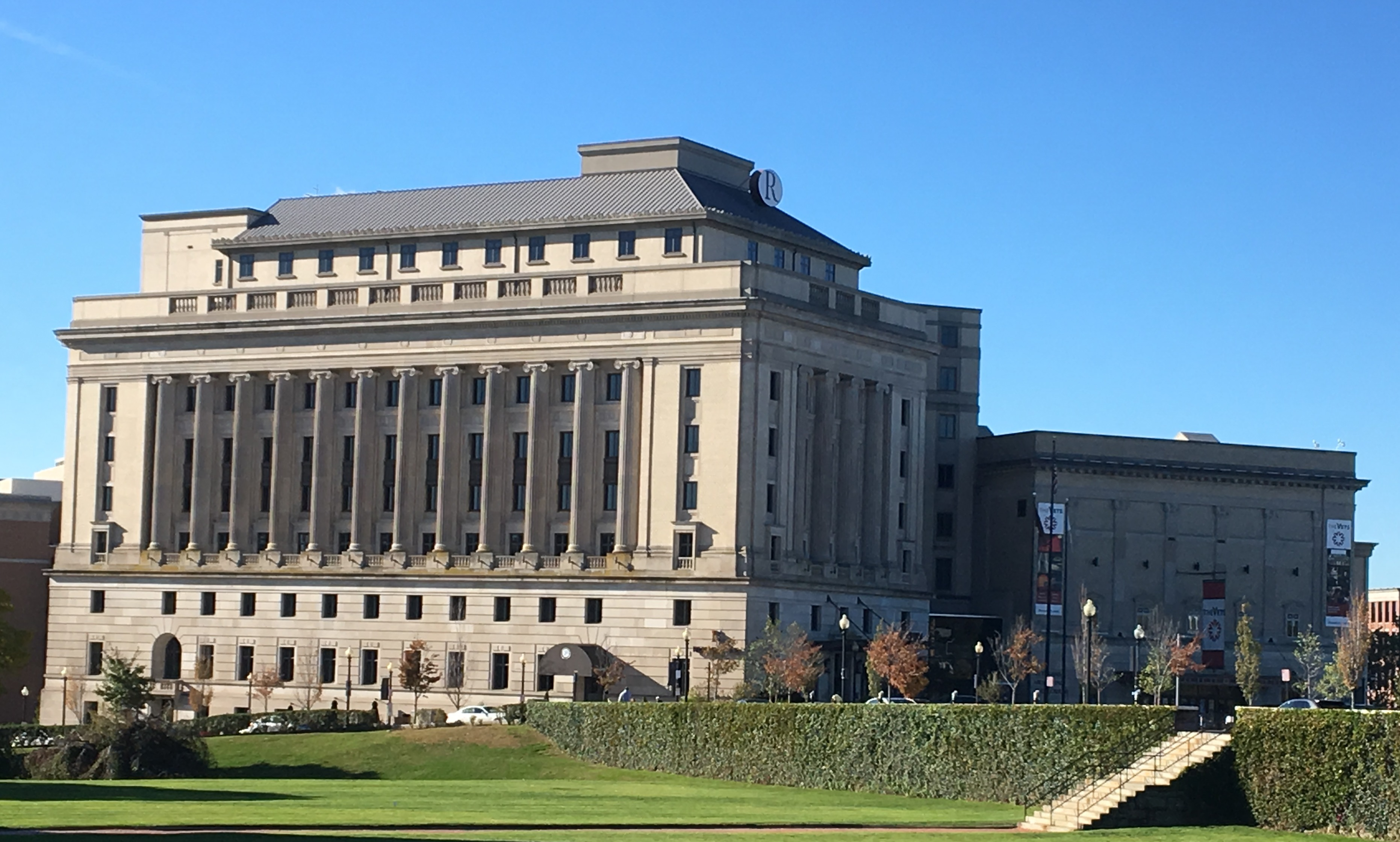
- The building with adjacent Veterans Memorial Auditorium at right.

- Location within Providence Location within Rhode Island Location within the United States
- Location: Providence, Rhode Island, US
- Coordinates: 41°49′48″N 71°25′00″W
- Built: 1927
- Architect: Multiple
- Architectural style: Classical Revival
- NRHP reference No.: 93001181
- Added to NRHP: November 16, 1993

The Renaissance Providence Hotel (historically known as the Mason Building, and listed on the National Register of Historic Places under Masonic Temple)—is one of two monumental buildings in central Providence, Rhode Island, US, that remained unfinished and were then abandoned for decades. Originally intended as a meeting hall for the Freemasons, construction work began in 1927, but was halted in 1929 as a result of the financial crisis of that year. With the outbreak of World War II, construction was halted permanently. It was added (under the name "Masonic Temple") to the National Register of Historic Places in 1993, along with the adjacent Veterans Memorial Auditorium. In 2004 the building was rehabilitated and opened as a hotel in 2007.

== Description ==
The building, constructed in the Greek Revival style, is located prominently on Francis Street opposite the Rhode Island State House. The opening of the Providence Place Mall next door across Hayes Street has made the site prime real estate. In 2004, the building was purchased by Sage Hospitality Resources, which converted it into a luxury hotel, which opened in June 2007.

The adjoining building known as the Veterans Memorial Auditorium (VMA), located between the hotel and Interstate 95, was originally part of the same complex, and was connected to the unfinished Masonic Temple by a small structure at ground level. While construction halted at the same time as that at the Temple building, the auditorium was completed in the 1950s.

== Controversy ==
In 2011, the hotel received widespread attention for its working conditions following worker attempts at unionizing and a viral YouTube video of a worker quitting in protest with a marching band. Workers at the hotel—a large number of whom are of Dominican origin—called for a boycott of the hotel. The Procaccianti Group of Cranston, Rhode Island, which bought the hotel in late 2012, denied any wrongdoing and called the boycott "misguided". The labor dispute continued after Omni Hotels, of Dallas, Texas, bought the property in 2015.
