= The Low Anthem =

American indie folk band

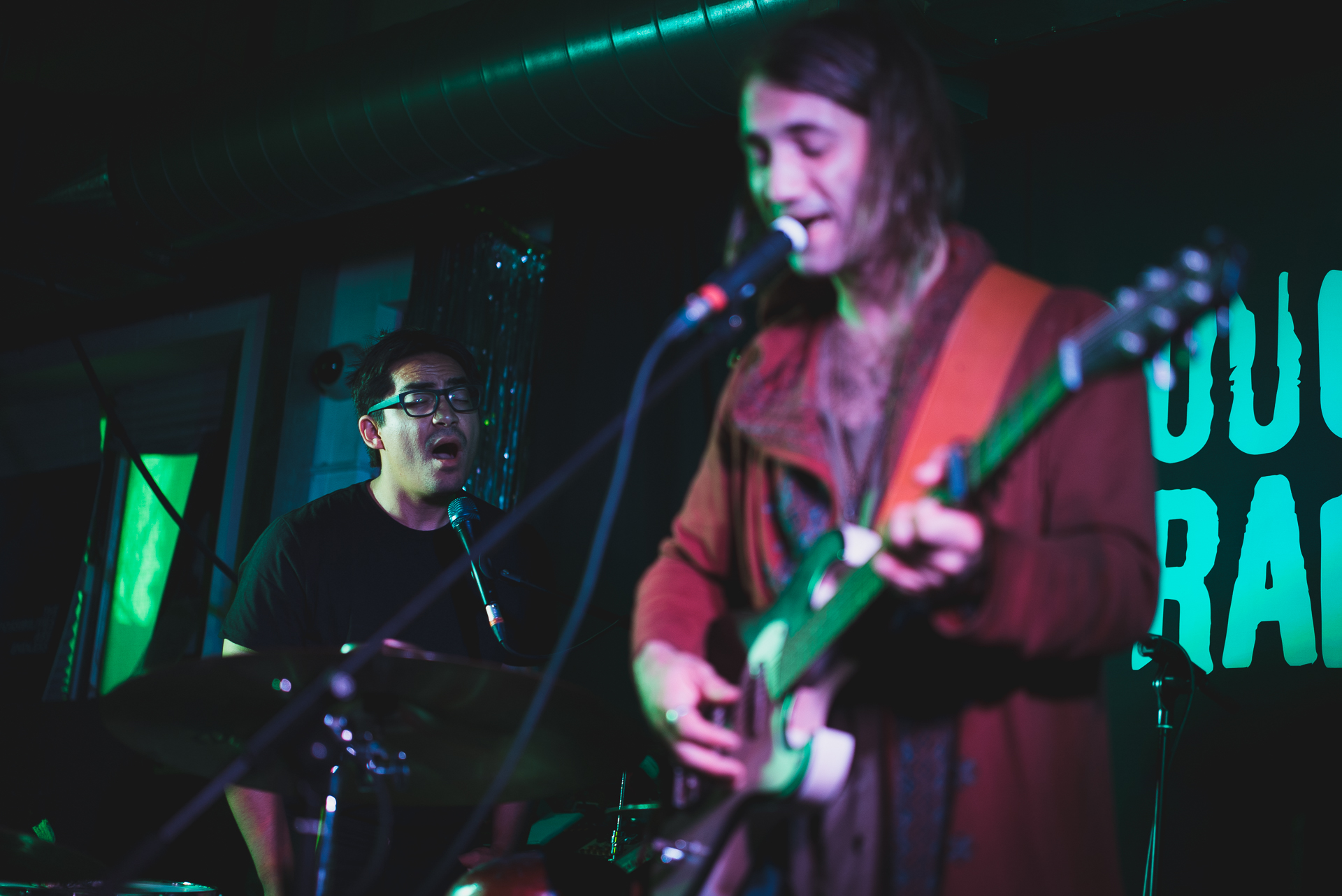
- The Low Anthem founding members Jeff Prystowsky (left) and Ben Knox Miller (right) in July 2016

Background information
- Origin: Providence, Rhode Island, U.S.
- Genres: Indie folk; experimental; alternative rock
- Years active: 2006–present
- Labels: Joyful Noise; Nonesuch; Bella Union; Concord
- Members: Ben Knox Miller; Jeff Prystowsky; Florence Grace Wallis; Bryan Minto
- Past members: Dan Lefkowitz; Cyrus Scofield; Jocie Adams; Mat Davidson; Tyler Osborne; Mike Irwin; Andy Davis
- Website: lowanthem.com

The Low Anthem is a band from Providence, Rhode Island, formed in 2006 by friends Ben Knox Miller and Jeff Prystowsky. The current lineup consists of Knox Miller (vocals, guitars, trumpets, saws), Prystowsky (vocals, drums, double basses, synths), Bryan Minto (vocals, guitars, harmonicas) and Florence Grace Wallis (violins, vocals).

The Low Anthem have written, produced, and recorded five albums: What The Crow Brings (2007), Oh My God, Charlie Darwin (2008), Smart Flesh (2011), Eyeland (2016), and The Salt Doll Went to Measure the Depth of the Sea (2018). They were Mojo magazine's Breakthrough Artist of the Year in 2010.

== History ==
=== 2006–2007: Formation, early years, and What the Crow Brings ===
Founders of the Low Anthem, Ben Knox Miller and Jeffrey Prystowsky met while DJing an overnight jazz radio show for Brown University's radio station WBRU. They became friends and teammates for a local wood-bat baseball team called the Providence Grays (Providence, Rhode Island), that Prystowsky was player-managing, while teaching baseball history at a local high school. Miller and Prystowsky played in various ensembles together ranging from classical and jazz to electronica, and the Low Anthem was formed in 2006. In the fall of 2006, Dan Lefkowitz, a bluesman from Strasburg, Virginia, joined the band and contributed to the development of their earlier sound by writing "This God Damn House". Early in 2007, Lefkowitz left the band to pursue simple living in a yurt in Arkansas. Ever since, the band continues to play the song in their live sets, ending the arrangement with the cell phone trick, where feedback loops create a haunting reverb that the whole audience participates in. The band became a trio again in late 2007 with the addition of classical composer and clarinetist Jocie Adams, then a fellow student, who joined the band after a late-night recording session for the band's album What The Crow Brings. She appears on vocals and clarinet on the album's closing track, "Coal Mountain Lullaby".

What the Crow Brings, the Low Anthem's first full-length studio concept album, was recorded in Miller and Prystowsky's third floor apartment in Providence over several months in 2007, with mostly a single microphone, and was self-released on October 2, 2007. The band took on every aspect of manufacturing the album including dumpster diving for empty cereal boxes to fold into album sleeves, creating the silkscreens for the album art, and hand painting and serial-numbering 600 copies of the album. The first band to take them out on tour was Surprise Me Mr. Davis, a side project of the Barr Brothers.

=== 2008–2009: Oh My God, Charlie Darwin ===
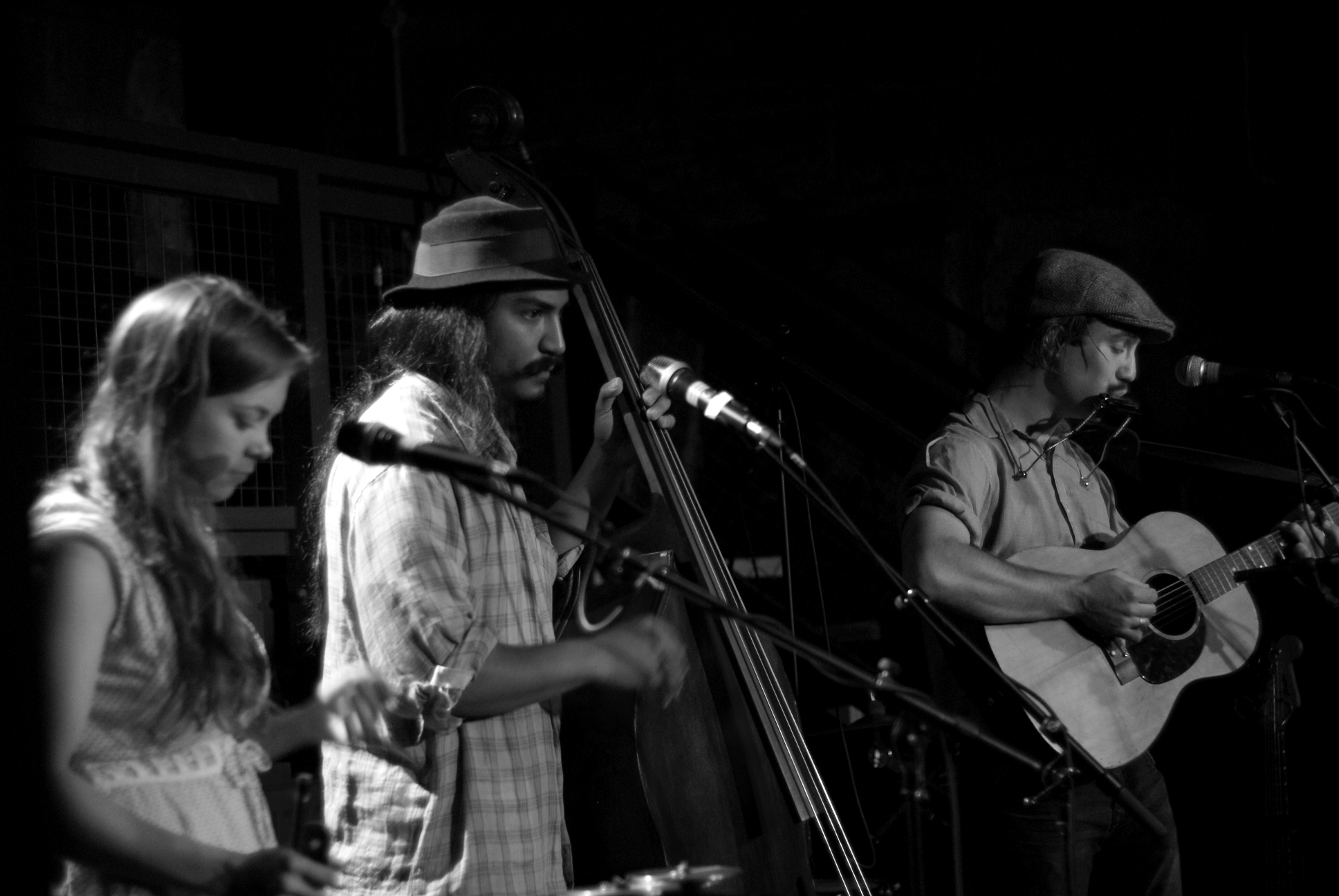
The Low Anthem (L to R: Adams, Prystowsky, Miller) performing at Cluny 2 in September 2009

The Low Anthem recorded in January 2008, and self-released its second full-length studio concept album, Oh My God, Charlie Darwin, on September 2, 2008. The band traveled to Block Island in the middle of winter and spent ten days recording the tracks in the basement of a cabin with engineer and co-producer Jesse Lauter. After the album was completed, the band returned to the island to handpaint and silkscreen the first 2000 copies of the album. While touring, the Low Anthem first gained some recognition in the UK when Rough Trade decided to make it an Album of the Month. End of the Road Festival then booked the band and released a 7" single of "Charlie Darwin" coinciding with the celebration of Darwin Day.

At Newport Folk Festival that year, Miller and Prystowsky joined the recycling crew to get backstage and handed out copies of Oh My God, Charlie Darwin to Paste magazine and Jay Sweet, the festival's director, hoping to catch a break. Paste featured the record in an upcoming issue, and Sweet booked them for the next year's festival. The band signed record deals with both Nonesuch Records and the UK label Bella Union and both rereleased Oh My God, Charlie Darwin after Bob Ludwig re-mastered the disc. There was new artwork and the track order was resequenced. In the summer of 2009, the band played the US festivals Bonnaroo, Lollapalloza, the Newport Folk Festival, and Austin City Limits. In addition to headlining shows throughout Europe, the Low Anthem also played Glastonbury, Hyde Park Calling, Wireless, and End of the Road Festivals in the UK.

In November, the Low Anthem released its debut music video for "Charlie Darwin", a claymation work by Glenn Taunton and Simon Taffe. On November 20, 2009, the Low Anthem made its television debut on Later... with Jools Holland. During its November 2009 tour in Europe, Mat Davidson, an old friend and multi-instrumentalist, joined the band.

The beginning of 2010 saw the band's first of three US television appearances on the Late Show with David Letterman, where it performed "Charlie Darwin", and a short tour in Europe, including its biggest headlining show at Shepherd's Bush Empire. The band returned to the US to support the Avett Brothers and then completed its first headline tour of the US.

=== 2010–2012: Smart Flesh ===
From December 2009 to February 2010, the band recorded its third full-length studio concept album, Smart Flesh, in the abandoned Porino's pasta sauce factory in Central Falls, Rhode Island. The album was engineered by Jesse Lauter, mixed by Mike Mogis (Bright Eyes). The band released "Ghost Woman Blues", the first song on the record as a free download in December on its Web site.

In Feb-March 2010, the band toured with The Avett Brothers and Timber Timbre. In Nov 9-21 2010, the band toured with Emmylou Harris, and played Lincoln Center's American Songbook Series in January 2011. Emmylou Harris recorded "To Ohio" for her record, Hard Bargain. The band appeared again on the Late Show with David Letterman on January 12, 2011, performing "Ghost Woman Blues". Smart Flesh, the band's third full-length studio concept album, was released on February 22, 2011.

The band toured with Iron & Wine in April 2011, including opening for their show at Terminal 5 in NYC on Oct 13 2011.

Mat Davidson played his last show with the band on July 9, 2011, in Quebec and was replaced by Mike Irwin. Upon Davidson's exit, the band noted, "He is a friend, an incredible musician, and we will all miss him dearly." On December 20, 2011, the band released an album for free under the alter-ego Snake Wagon, entitled Have Fun With Snake Wagon. The album was recorded during the same sessions as Smart Flesh, with band members switching instruments.

In December 2011, the band added Tyler Osborne to its line-up. Osborne's first shows with the band were in Canada, whilst the band supported City & Colour, January–February 2012.

On February 22, 2012, the band announced that they had recorded a soundtrack album for the forthcoming film, Arcadia. The band's website stated, "The soundtrack is self-engineered and was recorded in a week. It consists of a few composed songs and harvested sections of epic improvised sessions. It was a new process for us." In 2012, the band recorded with T Bone Burnett for The Hunger Games: Songs from District 12 and Beyond.

On March 13, 2012, the band joined The Chieftains for a rendition of "School Day's Over" on Late Night with David Letterman for their third appearance on the show. On March 17, 2012, the band joined The Chieftains at Carnegie Hall in NYC. On May 29, 2012, the band joined The Chieftains on WGBH (FM) and for a short tour.

On March 16, 2012, the band opened for Bruce Springsteen and the E Street Band at the Moody Theatre in Austin, Texas for South by Southwest. They also joined him onstage, along with Tom Morello, Jimmy Cliff, Eric Burdon, members of Arcade Fire, Joe Ely, and Alejandro Escovedo, for the show's finale cover of Woody Guthrie's "This Land is Your Land". On April 11, 2012, the band announced plans for a hiatus from touring following its current commitments. An announcement on the band's official website stated, "We know the Darwin/Smart Flesh material inside and out ... Maybe some artists reach this point and become safer, more refined, imitations of themselves. We're not interested. So, we've decided that this upcoming tour will be the last tour of the chapter. The last tour devoted to this material, this incarnation."

=== 2013–2016: Eyeland ===
In 2013, the band set out to build their own recording studio, within an old vaudeville theatre, the Columbus Theatre, in Providence, RI, and record their fourth full-length album, Eyeland. In June 2013, Adams left the group to focus on her new project, Arc Iris. Tyler Osborne left shortly thereafter.

The band took time off after Adams and Osborne's departure. During this time, they recorded Brian Blade and the Fellowship, Xylouris White, and many other bands in their studio, and were featured on the cover of Tape Op Magazine. In 2016, the band finished their fourth full-length studio concept album, Eyeland, as well as their recording studio, Eyeland Studio, and helped the Columbus Theatre reopen its doors. The members of the Low Anthem are part of the Columbus Cooperative that runs programming at the theater, including film screenings and concerts.

The band signed to Washington Square Music, an imprint of Razor & Tie, of the Concord Music Group, in preparation for the release of Eyeland.

Eyeland was released on June 17, 2016. In June 2016, the band was involved in a serious car accident and suspended their tour to recover from their injuries. In October and November 2016, the band toured 33 shows and 16 countries throughout Europe.

=== 2017–present: The Salt Doll Went to Measure the Depth of the Sea ===
The band toured in August 2017, alongside Lucinda Williams. The band worked on their fifth full-length studio album, The Salt Doll Went to Measure the Depth of the Sea in Eyeland Recording Studio in Providence, RI, and released the album on Joyful Noise Recordings February 23, 2018. Famed critic Bob Boilen called 'Salt Doll' “a brilliant and peaceful album“ in his 2018 end-of-year write-up.

In fall of 2019, the band announced that they would be releasing a 10th anniversary limited edition vinyl pressing of Oh My God, Charlie Darwin, followed by an international tour. In the US, the special edition was released by Joyful Noise Recordings, and in Europe, it was released by Bella Union.

== Line-up ==
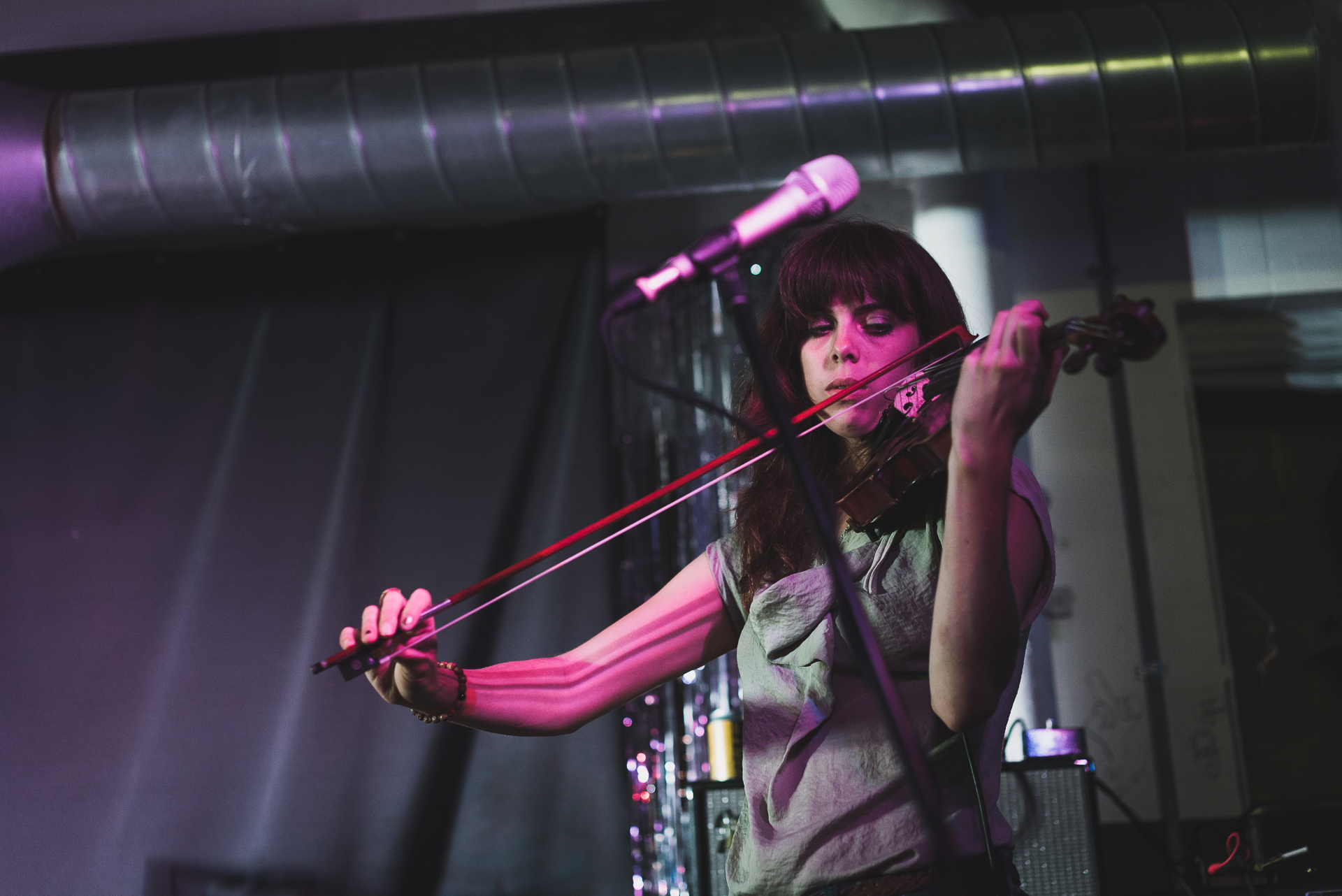
Florence Grace Wallis in July 2016

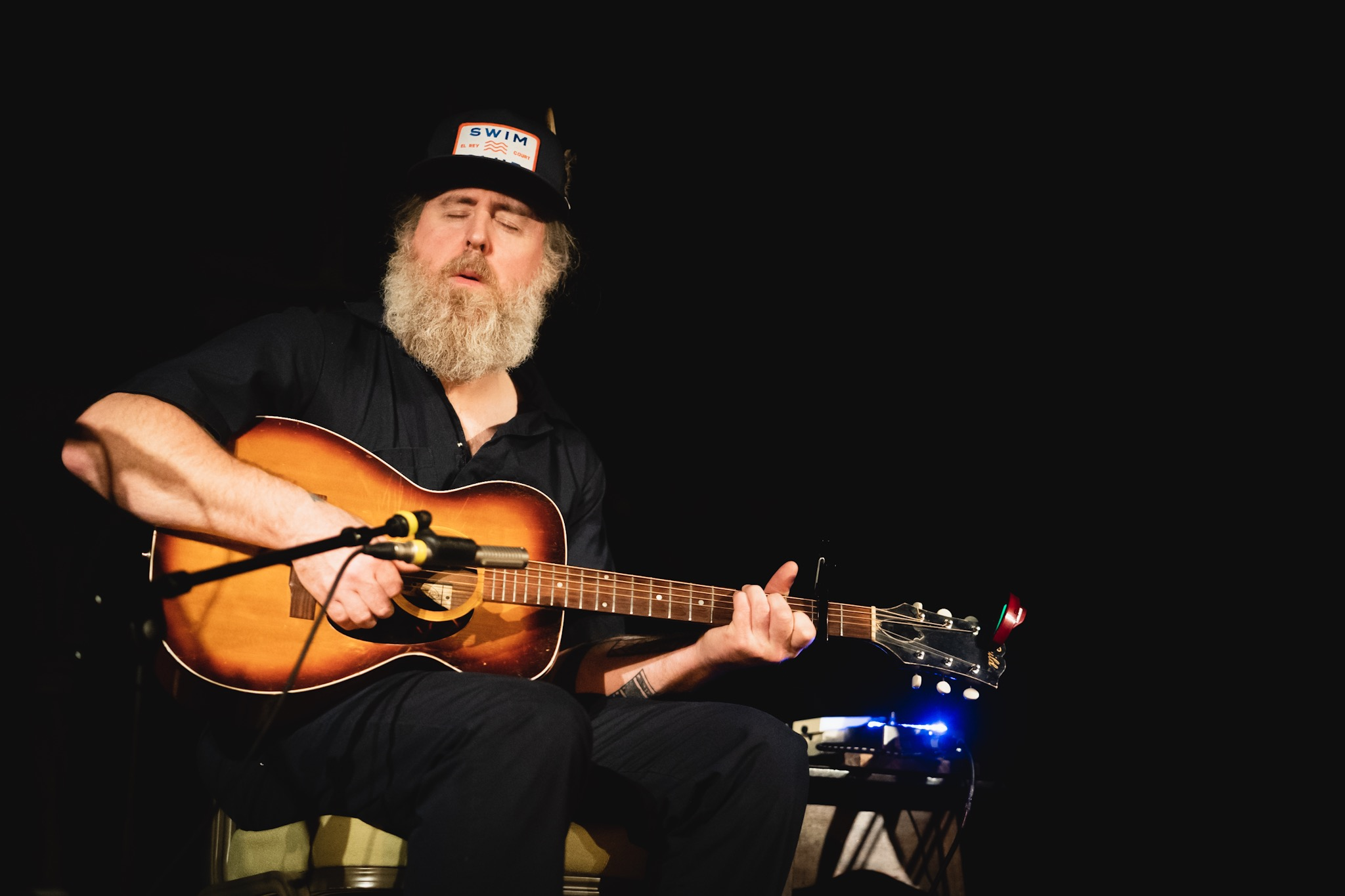
Bryan Minto in November 2019

=== Current members ===
- Ben Knox Miller - lead vocals, guitar, pianet, trumpet, saw (2006–present)
- Jeff Prystowsky - drums, double bass, electric bass, synths (2006–present)
- Florence Grace Wallis - vocals, violin (2013–present)
- Bryan Minto - guitar, harmonica (2013–present)

=== Former members ===
- Dan Lefkowitz - guitar (2006–2007)
- Cyrus Scofield - drums (2007)
- Mat Davidson - bass guitar, various instruments (2009–2011)
- Jocie Adams - vocals, clarinet, organ, dulcimer (2007–2013)
- Mike Irwin - trumpet, bass guitar, guitar (2011–2013)
- Tyler Osborne - electric guitar, bass guitar (2011–2013)
- Andy Davis - pianet, guitar (2013–2015)

== Discography ==
=== Albums ===
- The Low Anthem (2006)
- What the Crow Brings (2007)
- Oh My God, Charlie Darwin (2008)
- Smart Flesh (2011)
- Eyeland (2016)
- The Salt Doll Went to Measure the Depth of the Sea (2018)

Under the alter-ego Snake Wagon

- Have Fun With Snake Wagon (2011)

=== Singles ===
- "Charlie Darwin" b/w "To Ohio" and "Home I'll Never Be" (February 12, 2009, End of the Road Records [EOTR0011] 7" single)
- "Charlie Darwin" b/w "Sally, Where'd you Get Your Liquor From" (October 5, 2009, Bella Union Records [BELLAV215] 7" single)
- "To The Ghosts Who Write History Books" b/w "Don't Let Nobody Turn You Around" (February 15, 2010, Bella Union Records [BELLAV231] 7" single)
- "Charlie Darwin" b/w "Sally, Where'd you Get Your Liquor From" and "Don't Let Nobody Turn You Around" (March 23, 2010, Nonesuch Records [523775-7] 7" single)
- "Lover is Childlike" part of "The Hunger Games: Songs From District 12 & Beyond", title of the soundtrack to the movie "The Hunger Games"
