= Keaney Gymnasium =

Arena in Kingston, Rhode Island

Coordinates: 41.485993°N 71.536182°W

Frank W. Keaney Gymnasium
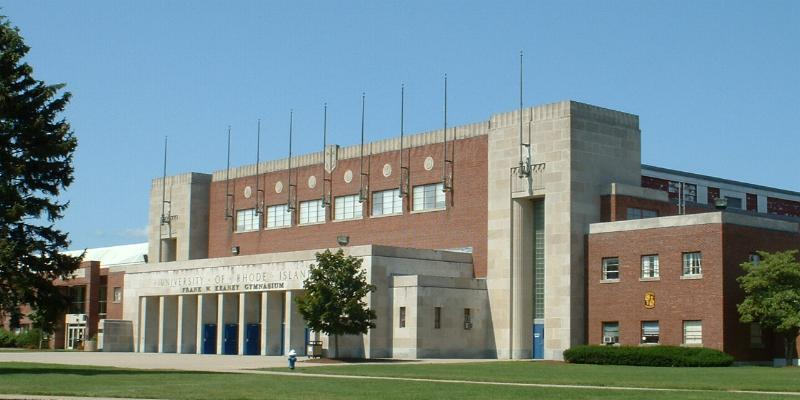
- Keaney Gymnasium
- Interactive map of Frank W. Keaney Gymnasium
- Location: Keaney Rd; Kingston, RI 02881
- Owner: University of Rhode Island
- Operator: University of Rhode Island
- Capacity: 3,385

Construction
- Opened: 1953
- Architect: Oresto DiSaia

Tenant
- University of Rhode Island Rams (Women's Volleyball)

Keaney Gymnasium is a multi-purpose arena in Kingston, Rhode Island, United States on the campus of the University of Rhode Island. Built in 1953, it was the home of the university's men's and women's basketball teams until they moved to the adjacent Ryan Center in 2002. It is currently the home of the university's volleyball team.

== History ==
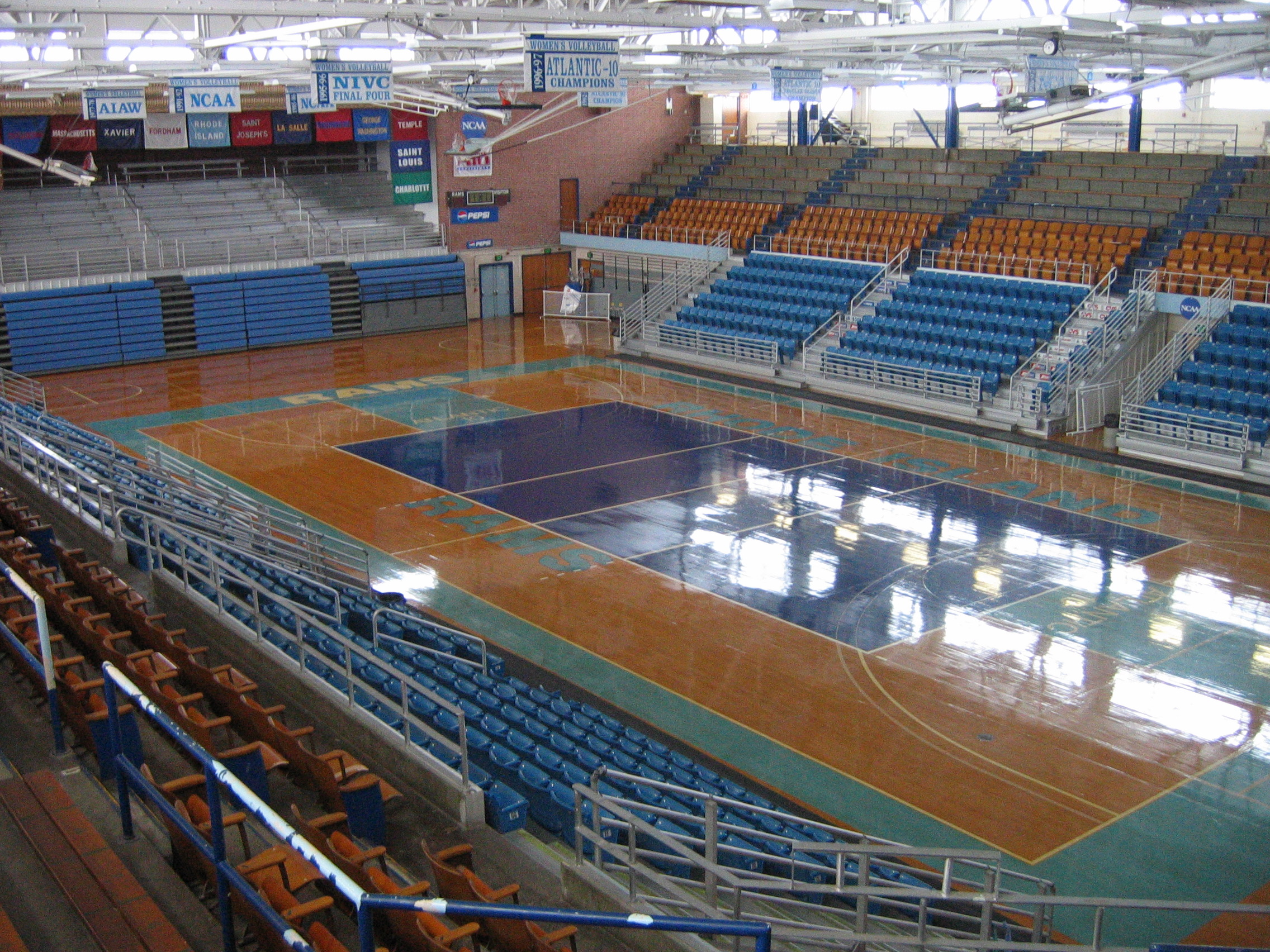
The gymnasium in 2008

The arena opened in 1953 and seats 3,385 (plus room for 500 standing-room only spectators). The arena was named in honor of Rhode Island football coach, chemistry professor, basketball coach and athletic director Frank Keaney. Seating is in a two-tiered arrangement, with the top tier being U-shaped. At the west end of the arena there are bleachers in the former stage area of the building. The arena hosted the NCAA basketball tournament first-round games for three years, from 1967 to 1969. Designed by Oresto DiSaia, it was built to replace Rodman Hall, a castle-like building built in 1928, located across the street from the present library. Rodman Hall currently houses the school's library sciences, landscape architecture, and journalism departments.

== Concerts ==
In addition to its role as a basketball and volleyball arena, the gymnasium also once hosted concerts for the university's students. Past performers include The Band (1970), Santana (1970), Joe Cocker (1970), Chicago (1970), The Beach Boys (1971 and 1973), Fairport Convention and Traffic (1971), Cat Stevens and Mimi Fariña (1971), Blue Öyster Cult (1971), The Byrds (1971), New Riders of the Purple Sage (1972), Jim Croce (1973), Bruce Springsteen (1973), The Flying Burrito Brothers (1975), A Flock of Seagulls (1982), Squeeze (1982 and 1987), Elvis Costello and Nick Lowe (1989), Bob Dylan (1989 and 2002), Red Hot Chili Peppers (1990), The Alarm and The Fixx (1992), Violent Femmes (1992 and 1996), and Evanescence (2007).
