= Veterans Memorial Auditorium (Providence, Rhode Island) =

Theater in Providence, Rhode Island, US

Veterans Memorial Auditorium (The VETS)
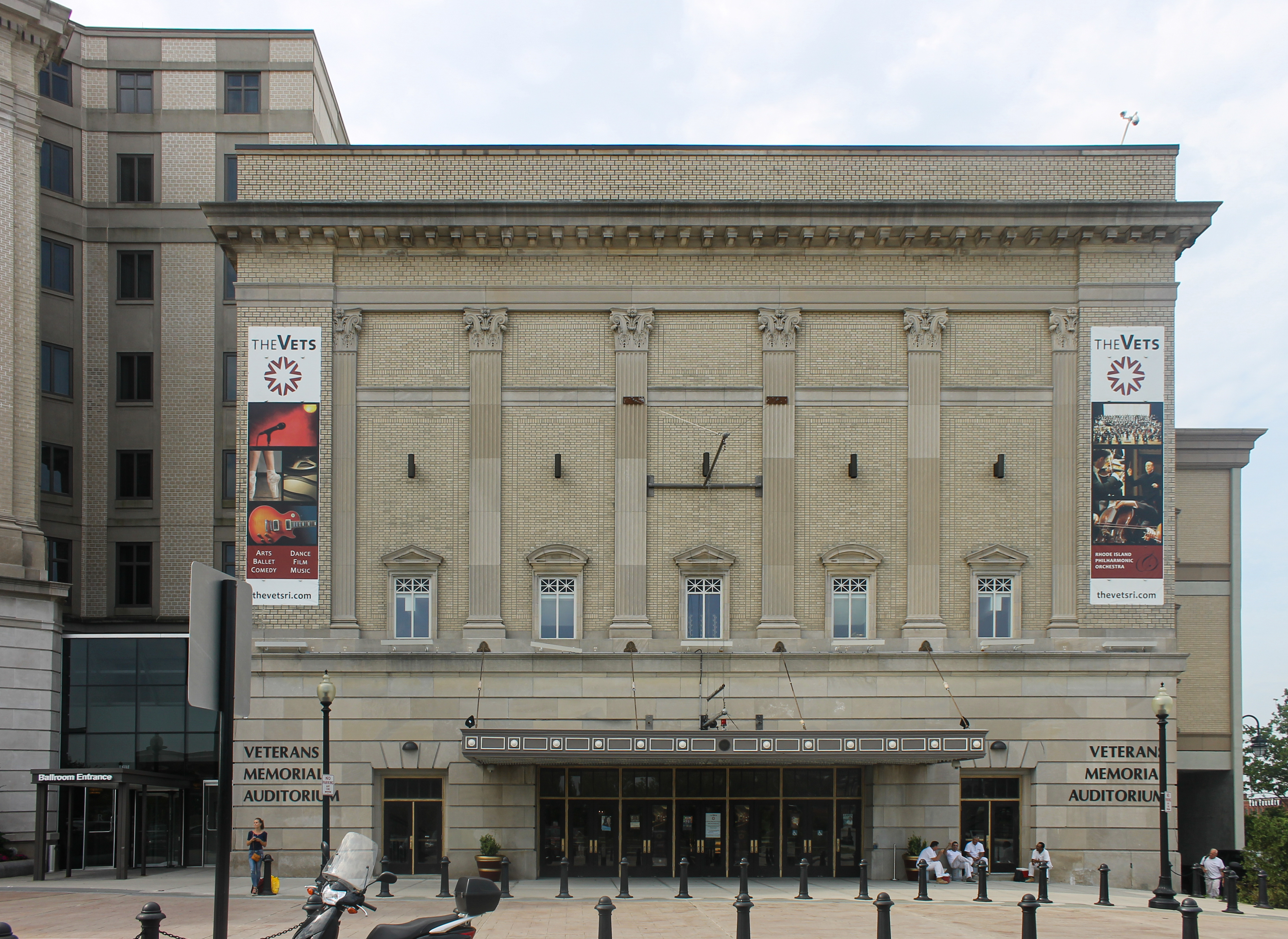
- Interactive map of Veterans Memorial Auditorium (The VETS)
- Address: One Avenue of the Arts; Providence, Rhode Island
- Owner: State of Rhode Island
- Operator: Professional Facilities Management
- Capacity: 1,931
- Type: Performing arts center

Construction
- Opened: January 27, 1950

Website
- www.thevetsri.com
- Veterans Memorial Auditorium--Masonic Temple
- U.S. National Register of Historic Places
- Coordinates: 41°49′47.45″N 71°25′2.73″W
- Area: 1.25 acres (0.51 ha)
- Built: 1928–1950
- Architect: Multiple
- Architectural style: Classical Revival
- NRHP reference No.: 93001181
- Added to NRHP: November 16, 1993

Veterans Memorial Auditorium (The VETS; formerly VMA) is a performing arts theater in Providence, Rhode Island. Construction began in 1928 but was delayed by the Great Depression. The theater was finally completed in 1950.

Noted local architect Oresto DiSaia was given the contract to plan the completion. The VETS is among the oldest arts venues in Rhode Island and is on the National Register of Historic Places. The adjacent Performing Arts Complex was erected in 1970 and is partially owned by the Veterans' Memorial Foundation. It was completely restored in 1990. The ornately designed 1,931-seat concert hall houses the largest theater stage in Rhode Island.

The performance space features a gilded proscenium arch, as well as allegorical and heraldic ceiling murals. The Rhode Island Philharmonic Orchestra holds several concerts at The VETS each year. In addition, The VETS hosts a broad range of events each season, offering a variety of performances, rehearsals, exhibitions, concerts, educational events, meetings, and other special events. Since 1950, when the theater opened, it began to fall into disrepair. In the early 1980s, the state of Rhode Island was thinking of closing the auditorium and the adjoining Masonic Temple and reducing the complex to a parking lot. In 1983, the Veterans Memorial Auditorium Preservation Association (VMAPA) was formed to try to save the auditorium. They rallied for five years and, in 1988, Governor DiPrete awarded the VMAPA with $5 million for the building's renovation. Since that time, it has been a center for the arts. In 2015, The VETS completed another series of renovations, making it a state-of-the-art performance facility. The Renaissance Providence Hotel, formerly the Masonic Temple, is adjacent to The VETS.

Five visual and performing arts companies perform at The VETS: FirstWorks, the Rhode Island Philharmonic Orchestra, Festival Ballet Providence, the Rhode Island International Film Festival and the Art League Rhode Island.

== See also ==
- National Register of Historic Places listings in Providence, Rhode Island
