= The Salt Doll Went to Measure the Depth of the Sea =

The Salt Doll Went To Measure The Depth Of The Sea

Studio album by the Low Anthem
- Released: February 23, 2018
- Studio: Eyeland
- Genre: Indie folk
- Length: 42:20
- Label: Joyful Noise
- Producer: The Low Anthem

The Low Anthem chronology
Eyeland (2016)	The Salt Doll Went To Measure The Depth Of The Sea (2018)

The Salt Doll Went To Measure the Depth of the Sea is the fifth full-length studio album by American indie-folk band the Low Anthem, released on February 23, 2018, on Joyful Noise Recordings. It was composed by Ben Knox Miller in the days following a traumatic automobile accident that devastated the band, sending members to the hospital and destroying their instruments.

== Background ==
"I remember looking at the burning van wrapped around a steel pole and knowing it was the end [of an era for the band]. I wasn't hurt so I rented a box truck and packed up all our broken instruments and drove them from D.C. to Providence. That night I was reading Kay Larsen's biography of John Cage, Where the Heart Beats, and came across the Salt Doll fable. I have found several versions of the Salt Doll story, but all basically tell the story of a doll that wants to know the ocean. The ocean says 'come in.' It puts its toe in, and knows something, but loses its toe. Puts its foot in, knows more, but loses its foot... and so on. I began to imagine its journey, and 16 days later the first version of [our new] album was written and recorded." After Jeff Prystowsky (Knox-Miller's longtime bandmate who'd been injured in the crash) recovered, they completed the album.

"I don't know what kind of headspace I was in for those 16 days," Knox-Miller wrote of The Salt Doll's... rapid composition. "I was alone. All of my regular instruments were destroyed (along with my bandmates). I had a parlor acoustic [guitar], a 64-key piano and a '90s era DA-88 digital 8-track tape machine in my bedroom. I had been using it to record abstract instrumental tracks, produced by processing beats physically cut into the center loops of vinyl records. My turntable was running 24 hours a day and I set up a signal chain with crossovers and guitars pedals and electronic and physical filters, and the room was filled with continuous hypnotic sound. I think of the music as made of circles," he wrote. "There is a safe sense of time (a constant feeling of return), but some of the space that is opened up is so bare as to be nearly uncomfortable. Amongst ourselves we call the sound 'subtle energy circularism.' A lot of the sounds on Salt Doll comes from tiny sources, like a chopstick scraping the rim of a brown paper bag or a record needle bouncing in a divot."

== Track listing ==
1. Bone of Sailor, Bone of Bird 2:41
2. River Brine 1:53
3. Give My Body Back 2:01
4. Drowsy Dowsing Dolls 3:15
5. The Krill Whistle Their Fight Song 2:11
6. Toowee Toowee 2:46
7. Coral Crescent 2:08
8. Dotwav 2:01
9. Cy Twombly By Campfire 2:51
10. Gondwanaland 2:45
11. To Get Over Only One Side 3:45
12. Final Transmission From The Diving Umbrella 3:04

== Personnel ==
The Low Anthem

- Ben Knox Miller
- Jeff Prystowsky
- Florence Grace Wallis
- Bryan Minto
