= Person of faith =

The description person of faith (plural: people of faith) refers to any person who can be delineated or classified by an adherence to a religious tradition or doctrine, as opposed to those who do not publicly identify or in any way espouse a religious path.

The term people of faith has been increasingly used in the twentieth and twenty-first century by religious adherents in Westernized countries who are critical of a perceived increase in public disenchantment or de-emphasis upon accommodation for religious adherents, although the term itself is used more as a catch-all term which is intentionally non-denominational or non-specific to any particular religious path. A person of faith is said to belong to a faith community or faith-based community.

The term is also criticized by advocates of nontheistic positions for being inaccurate in its assumption of an underlying, unifying commonality between all religious observants – despite stark doctrinal differences and oppositional stances – simply for the purpose of reducing the influence of secular-minded individuals (similar to the term person of color as a catch-all descriptor of non-white people, or the Islamic description of people of the Book to describe the communities of adherents to Islam, Christianity, and Judaism).

== Persian term (in Islam) ==
In Islam, there is a Persian term اهل ایمان, which literally means "people of faith". It is first founded in the Persian translation of the Quran by Mirza Mahdi Elahi Ghomshei (1901–1973) based on the following example below:

.ای اهل ایمان ، روزی حلال و پاکیزه‌ای که ما نصیب شما کرده‌ایم بخورید و شکر خدا به جای آرید اگر شما خالص خدا را می‌پرستید

Meaning: O people of faith, eat the lawful and pure foods which We have bestowed upon you, and be grateful to Allah if you sincerely worship Him.

Source: Quran, Surah al-Baqarah, verse 172
