= Columbus Theatre (Providence, Rhode Island) =

Movie theater and concert venue in Rhode Island, US

Uptown Theater
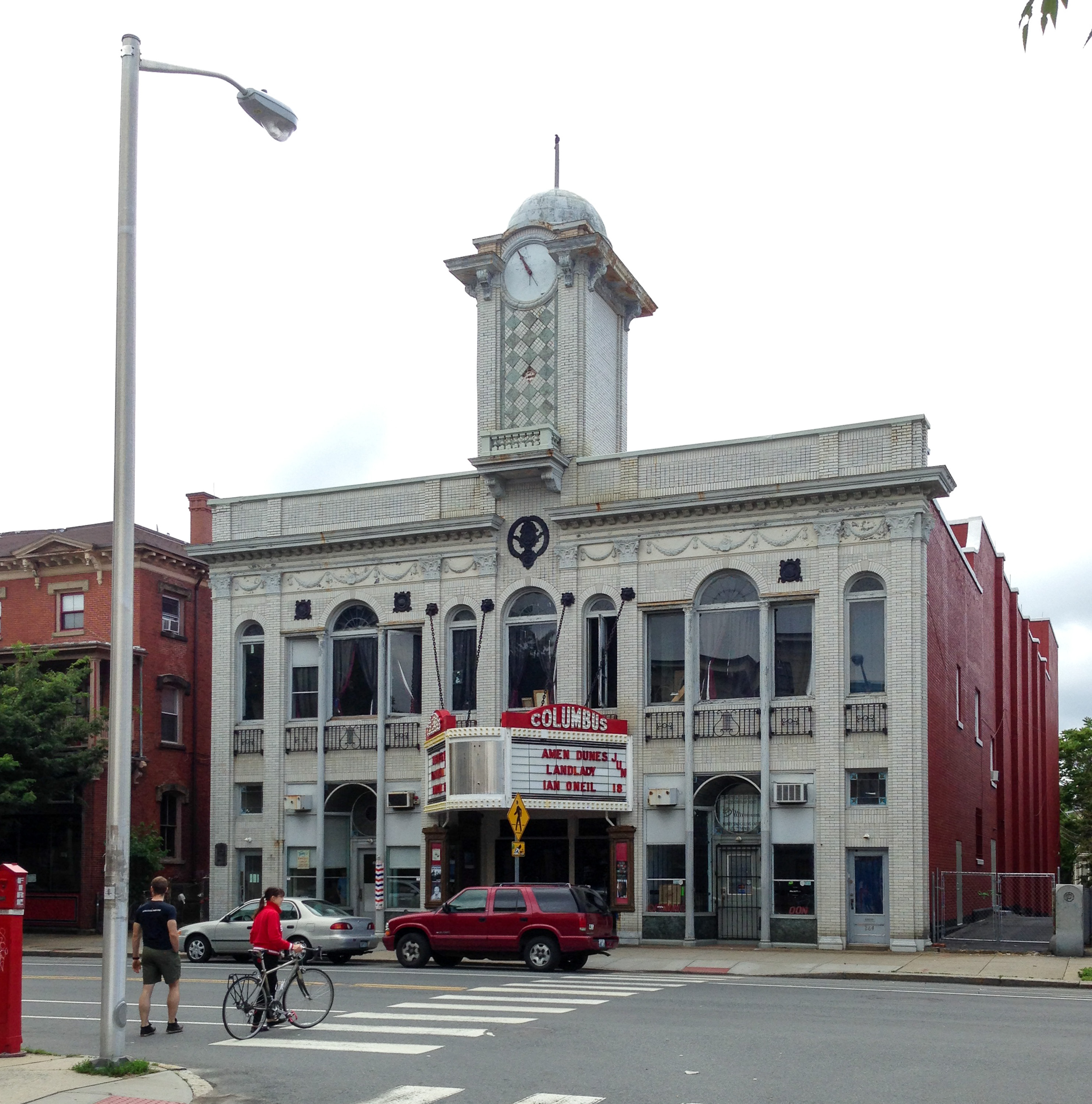
- The Columbus Theatre, Broadway
- Interactive map of the Uptown Theater area

General information
- Status: Active
- Location: 270 Broadway, Providence, Rhode Island, 02903
- Coordinates: 41.82013°N 71.42627°W
- Completed: 1926
- Opened: November 1, 1926
- Renovated: 1962, 2012, 2025
- Owner: Cory Brailsford and David Fiorillo

Technical details
- Floor count: 2

Design and construction
- Known for: Independent cinema

Other information
- Seating capacity: 1000

Website
- Uptown Theater

The Columbus Theatre, now known as the Uptown Theater, is a movie theater and concert venue in Providence, Rhode Island. The theater is located at 270 Broadway in the city's Broadway–Armory Historic District.

== History ==
The building was designed by architect Oreste DiSaia and built by realtor Domenic Annotti in 1926. DiSaia designed it to be “outdated”. Art Deco was the fashion of the time but he designed it as “a 19th-century Italianate palace.”

When opened, the theater featured vaudeville and silent films before it was leased by RKO Albee Theater. It was considered “one of Providence’s premier cinemas for the next 25 years.”. In 1929, it was renamed the Uptown Theatre.

They fell on hard times until Misak Berberian bought it in the summer of 1962. He returned it to original name. With his son Jon in charge, they renovated the theatre. After extensive repairs, they reopened the Theatre on November 1, 1962 (the 36th anniversary of the original opening). They closed again in 2009 to make necessary “fire updates” required after the Station nightclub fire and reopened November 17, 2012.

When Jon Berberian took over, he programmed second-run movies, a few operas and recitals. But facing competition from the multiplexes that opened in Providence, the theater began showing pornographic films. Since the most recent renovation, the theater has hosted a variety of entertainment including live performances. Performers have included John C. Reilly and his band, John Reilly and Friends.

The Columbus Cooperative ran the Theatre. They have two theatres - the small theatre upstairs seats 200, and the large theatre seats 800. The Columbus Cooperative included the Providence folk band The Low Anthem, whose members assist in planning events such as film screenings and concerts.

The theater closed again in June 2024, with a performance by comedian Jessica Kirson on June 9 as the final scheduled event, per an announcement in May by general manager Tom Weyman. Owner Jon Berberian later told WJAR that the theater would not be closed permanently and would undergo renovations during the summer of 2024. According to The Providence Journal, Weyman's statement may allude to "finding a new caretaker for the building." In October 2024, the theater was purchased by Cory Brailsford and David Fiorillo, the owners of the Comedy Connection comedy club in Providence.

The theater reopened under its former name the Uptown Theater on August 14, 2025 and resumed its concert schedule. The first scheduled event at the theater was a performance by comedian Kevin Nealon that night, with the first concert being Ace Frehley on September 5.
