= Doping in American football =

The use of anabolic steroids and performance-enhancing drugs in American football is officially prohibited by virtually every sanctioning body.

The National Football League (NFL) began to test players for steroid use during the 1987 season, and started to issue suspensions to players during the 1989 season. The NFL has issued as many as six random drug tests to players, with each player receiving at least one drug test per season. One notable incident occurred in 1992, when defensive end Lyle Alzado died from brain cancer, which was attributed to the use of anabolic steroids; however, Alzado's doctors stated that anabolic steroids did not contribute to his death.

The use of performance-enhancing drugs has also been found in other levels of football, including college level, and high school. The most recent figures from the National Collegiate Athletic Association (NCAA) football drug tests (see NCAA drug testing) show that one percent of all NCAA football players failed drug tests taken at bowl games, and three percent have admitted to using steroids overall. In the NCAA, players are subject to random testing with 48 hours notice, and are also randomly tested throughout the annual bowl games. The NCAA will usually take approximately 20 percent of the players on a football team to test on a specific day.

Anabolic steroids and other performance-enhancing drugs are also used throughout high school football. Steroid use at this level of play doubled from 1991 to 2003, with results of a survey showing that about 6 percent of players out of the 15,000 surveyed had admitted to using some type of anabolic steroid or performance-enhancing drug at one point in their playing time. Other data shows that only 4 percent of high schools have some form of drug testing program in place for their football teams.

== Use in the NFL ==
The use of performance-enhancing drugs and anabolic steroids dates back to the late 1960s in the National Football League (NFL). The case of Denver Broncos defensive lineman Lyle Alzado notably exposed early use among NFL players. In the last years of his life, as he battled against the brain tumor that eventually caused his death at the age of 43, Alzado asserted that his steroid abuse directly led to his fatal illness, but his physician stated it could not possibly be true. Alzado recounted his steroid abuse in an article in Sports Illustrated. He said:

I started taking anabolic steroids in 1969 and never stopped. It was addicting, mentally addicting. Now I'm sick, and I'm scared. Ninety percent of the athletes I know are on the stuff. We're not born to be 300 lbs or jump 30ft. But all the time I was taking steroids, I knew they were making me play better. I became very violent on the field and off it. I did things only crazy people do. Once a guy sideswiped my car and I beat the hell out of him. Now look at me. My hair's gone, I wobble when I walk and have to hold on to someone for support, and I have trouble remembering things. My last wish? That no one else ever dies this way."

Former player and NFL coach Jim Haslett said in 2005 that during the 1980s, half of the players in the league used some type of performance-enhancing drug or steroid and all of the defensive lineman used them. One of the players from the Super Bowl winning 1979 Pittsburgh Steelers team who had earlier confessed to using steroids (in a 1985 Sports Illustrated article) was offensive lineman Steve Courson. Courson blamed a heart condition that he developed on steroids. However, Courson also said that some of his teammates, such as Jack Ham and Jack Lambert, refused to use any kind of performance-enhancing drug.

The BALCO Scandal in 2003 also revealed many users of steroids in the NFL. The scandal followed a US Federal government investigation of the Bay Area Laboratory Co-operative (BALCO) into accusations of its supplying anabolic steroids to professional athletes. U.S. sprint coach Trevor Graham had given an anonymous phone call to the U.S. Anti-Doping Agency (USADA) in June 2003 accusing a number of athletes being involved in doping with a steroid that was not detectable at the time. He named BALCO owner Victor Conte as the source of the steroid. As evidence, Graham delivered a syringe containing traces of a substance nicknamed The Clear.

Shortly after, then-director of the UCLA Olympic Analytical Laboratory Don Catlin, developed a testing process for The Clear (tetrahydrogestrinone (THG)). With the ability to detect THG, the USADA retested 550 existing urine samples from athletes, of which several proved to be positive for THG.

A number of players from the Oakland Raiders were implicated in this scandal, including Bill Romanowski, Tyrone Wheatley, Barret Robbins, Chris Cooper and Dana Stubblefield. Recently, many players have confessed to steroid use. One of these players was former Oakland Raiders player Bill Romanowski. Romanowski confessed on 60 Minutes to using steroids for a two-year period beginning in 2001. He stated that these were supplied by former NFL player and former head of BALCO Victor Conte, saying:

I took [human growth hormone] for a brief period and ... I definitely didn't receive what I got out of THG."

A notable occurrence happened in 2006. During the season, San Diego Chargers linebacker Shawne Merriman failed a drug test and was suspended for four games when his primary "A" sample and backup "B" sample both tested positive for a banned substance. Merriman was named NFL Defensive Rookie of the Year in 2005, with 54 tackles and 10 sacks. He also had a total of five passes defended and two forced fumbles. He was a starting player in the 2005 Pro Bowl, and was a leader on his team in sacks in the 2006 season. The incident led to the passage of a rule that forbids a player who tests positive steroids from being selected to the Pro Bowl in the year in which they tested positive. The rule is commonly referred to as the "Merriman Rule". However, NFL Commissioner Roger Goodell has tried to distance the policy from being associated with the player, stating that Merriman tested clean on 19 of 20 random tests for performance-enhancing drugs since entering the league.

The NFL drug testing season commences on 4/20 of each year. The NFL is known to take drug tests seriously. When an athlete is selected for a drug test, they must have it completed within 4 hours of notice, or else the league will start to impose fines and suspensions for not complying. If athletes fail to complete the test in the 4-hour window, the NFLPA will still treat it as if they tested positive, even if no drugs were found. The NFL has drastically increased the frequency of testing athletes. In the past 10 years, the NFL has begun to crack down heavily on athlete's use of performance-enhancing drugs and has further improved their testing methods each year since. The drug testing season closes at the end of the season; up until Super Bowl week, players may be subject to random drug tests.

Players are notified usually after practice via a note on their chair next to their locker that they are required to complete a drug test. Any failure or refusal to complete the test will be treated as a positive result, and the athlete will be given the full punishment as if they were tested positive. The athletes then have limited time to complete the test to be eligible to play the next week and so forth. The athlete will then urinate into a cup and that will be sent to an official testing facility to deem if the athlete is clean or is tested positive for an illegal substance. After all testing is completed, the athlete and club manager are notified of the results. If the test indicates that the athlete has taken performance-enhancing drugs, both individuals are notified of the imposed sanctions. Players can be tested either at a team facility or if the team is away they can be tested at the nearest NFL testing station.

=== Appeals process ===
If an athlete is deemed positive for PEDS, every player has the option to appeal the result. The most noticeable appeal that has been won in recent years was Richard Sherman, who in 2012 avoided a 4-game suspension because of wrongful practices when he was being tested. The likelihood of an appeal going the player's way is low. Very few players that are tested positive end up winning the appeal, and only a few have won the appeal in recent years.

== NFL banned substances policy ==
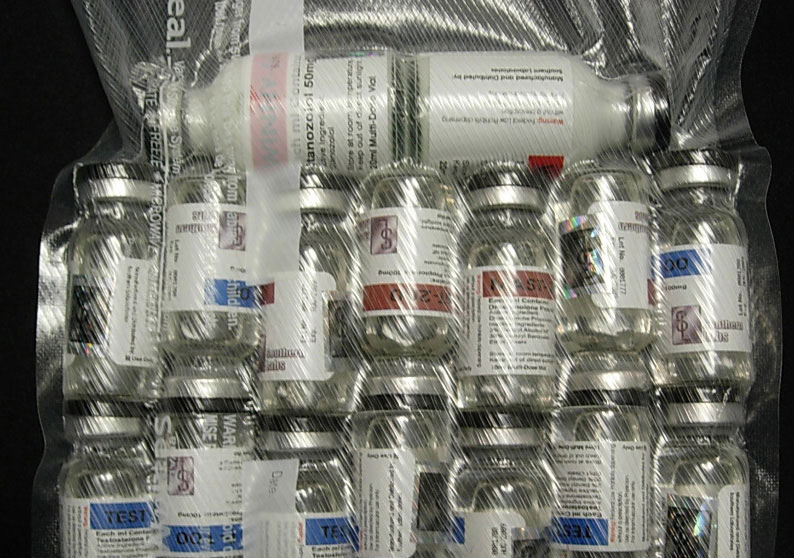
Numerous vials of injectable anabolic steroids, which have been listed as banned in the NFL banned substances policy.

The NFL banned substances policy has been acclaimed by some and criticized by others. Critics argue that the NFL's policy on performance-enhancing drugs, set by the NFL and by the players' union (National Football League Players Association) instead of an independent agency like USADA, bans a specific list of stimulants rather than a "catchall" approach like the World Anti-Doping Agency, and uses random testing instead of the globally accepted intelligence-driven testing. The policy is one of the longest running in professional sports, beginning in 1987. Since the NFL started random, year-round tests and suspending players for banned substances, many more players have been found to be in violation of the policy. By April 2005, 111 NFL players had tested positive for banned substances, and of those 111, the NFL suspended 54.

Though the policy involves all players getting tested times throughout the regular season, the playoffs, and during the off-season, Dr. Forest Tennant, the former drug adviser to the National Football League, stated that “its current policy, based on random testing, has not eliminated the problem.” The policy was different in the 1990s than it is today, due to heavy criticism from the United States Government. Originally, there were specific guidelines for when the player was caught using a steroid or other performance-enhancing drug. If a player was caught using steroids during training camp or some other off-season workout, they were suspended for 30 days for a first-time offense. Typically, this would mean missing four games, three in the pre-season and one in the regular season. Players would then be tested throughout the year for performance-enhancing drugs and steroids. A player who tested positively during a previous test might or might not be included in the next random sampling. A player who tested positive again would be suspended for one year, and a suspension for a third offense was never specified, because it never happened. In later years when many players ignored the policy, NFLPA director Gene Upshaw sent out a letter to all NFL players that stated:

"Over the past few years, we have made a special effort to educate and warn players about the risks involved in the use of "nutritional supplements." Despite these efforts, several players have been suspended even though their positive test result may have been due to the use of nutritional supplements. Under the Policy, you and you alone are responsible for what goes into your body. As the Policy clearly warns, supplements are not regulated or monitored by the government. This means that, even if they are bought over-the-counter from a known establishment, there is simply no way to be sure that they:

(a) contain the ingredients listed on the packaging;
(b) have not been tainted with prohibited substances; or
(c) have the properties or effects claimed by the manufacturer or salesperson.

Therefore, if you take these products, you do so AT YOUR OWN RISK! The risk is at least a 4-game suspension without pay if a prohibited substance is detected in your system. For your own health and success in the League, we strongly encourage you to avoid the use of supplements altogether, or at the very least to be extremely careful about what you choose to take."

The current policy includes having 20% of each team’s players blood-tested at random each year in training camp, and the offseason, 10% are blood-tested. The NFL employs isoform blood tests for Human Growth Hormone instead of the more precise biomarker test, which only has a detection window of 24 to 48 hours, and when notified at home, a player may take up to 24 hours to submit a sample.

== Use in college football ==
Steroids and performance-enhancing drugs have been reportedly used by many college football players in the NCAA. According to a recent drug test and survey, about one percent of all NCAA football players have tested positive for a performance-enhancing drug or steroid, and about three percent have admitted to using one sometime during their college football career. Controversy arose in 2005, when former Brigham Young University player Jason Scukanec, although never admitting to using steroids himself, stated that steroids were used in many notable Division I programs.

Scukanec, who is the co-host of a sports talk radio show "Primetime With Isaac and Big Suke" on KFXX-AM (AM 1080 "The Fan") in Portland, Oregon, made these statements:

Over the course of my five years at BYU, I have concrete proof of 13 to 15 guys (using steroids), and I would suspect five others...And BYU is more temperate than most programs. Being around NFL and NFL Europe players, they would tell me stuff that blew my mind. I know other schools are worse. I would bet my house you could find at least five guys on every Division I team in the country (using steroids).

Portland State University coach Tim Walsh commented on the situation, declining the remarks:

That’s a bold statement. It’s a tough accusation, to come up with a number like that. Is it true? Maybe, maybe not. I wish I could say I knew for sure. I’m not naive enough to think it’s not going on out there, but I feel pretty strongly it’s not been a problem with our players over the years.

The number of players who have admitted using steroids in a confidential survey conducted by the NCAA since the 1980s has dropped from 9.7 percent in 1989 to 3.0 percent in 2003. During the 2003 season, there were over 7,000 drug tests, with just 77 turning up as positive test results. Scukanec claims that methods were used to get around the drug testing, whether it be avoiding the tests by using the drugs during the off-season, or flushing the drugs out of your system. This was used with a liquid he referred to as the "pink." He stated:

There are a ton of (masking) products out there. What most of them cause is diuresis (increased excretion of urine), which means the athlete is providing diluted urine sample, almost water. In NCAA drug testing, the athlete is required to provide a concentrated specimen that passes a specific gravity cutoff. If the specimen is too diluted, he has to provide another sample. Using a product to cause diuresis is not going to help.

== Health issues ==
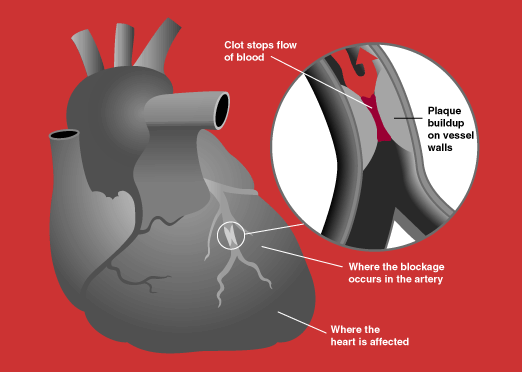
An example of a heart attack, which can occur after the use of a performance-enhancing drug.

Performance-enhancing drugs, most notably anabolic steroids can cause many health issues. Many American football players have experienced these health issues from using anabolic steroids, which have even resulted in some player's deaths. Most of these issues are dose-dependent, the most common being elevated blood pressure, especially in those with pre-existing hypertension, and harmful changes in cholesterol levels: some steroids cause an increase in LDL cholesterol and a decrease in HDL cholesterol. Anabolic steroids such as testosterone also increase the risk of cardiovascular disease or coronary artery disease. Acne is fairly common among anabolic steroid users, mostly due to stimulation of the sebaceous glands by increased testosterone levels. Conversion of testosterone to dihydrotestosterone (DHT) can accelerate the rate of premature baldness for those who are genetically predisposed.

Other side effects can include alterations in the structure of the heart, such as enlargement and thickening of the left ventricle, which impairs its contraction and relaxation. Possible effects of these alterations in the heart are hypertension, cardiac arrhythmias, congestive heart failure, heart attacks, and sudden cardiac death. These changes are also seen in non-drug using athletes, but steroid use may accelerate this process. However, both the connection between changes in the structure of the left ventricle and decreased cardiac function, as well as the connection to steroid use have been disputed.

High doses of oral anabolic steroid compounds can cause liver damage as the steroids are metabolized (17α-alkylated) in the digestive system to increase their bioavailability and stability. When high doses of such steroids are used for long periods, the liver damage may be severe and lead to liver cancer.

There are also gender-specific side effects of anabolic steroids. Development of breast tissue in males, a condition called gynecomastia (which is usually caused by high levels of circulating estrogen), may arise because of increased conversion of testosterone to estrogen by the enzyme aromatase. Reduced sexual function and temporary infertility can also occur in males. Another male-specific side effect which can occur is testicular atrophy, caused by the suppression of natural testosterone levels, which inhibits production of sperm (most of the mass of the testes is developing sperm). This side effect is temporary: the size of the testicles usually returns to normal within a few weeks of discontinuing anabolic steroid use as normal production of sperm resumes. Along with this the use of anabolic steroids also leads to an increased risk for prostate cancer. Female-specific side effects include increases in body hair, deepening of the voice, enlarged clitoris, temporary decreases in menstrual cycles, and male pattern baldness. When taken during pregnancy, anabolic steroids can affect fetal development by causing the development of male features in the female fetus and female features in the male fetus. In teens anabolic steroids can stunt the growth at an early age due to high hormone levels signaling the body to stop bone growth and can also stunt the growth of teens if the teens use the steroids before their growth spurt.

Even though anabolic steroids do not cause the same high as other drugs, they can lead to addiction. Studies have shown that animals will give themselves steroids when they have the chance, just as they do with other addictive drugs. People may continue to use steroids despite going through physical problems, and can cause family issues just like any other addictive drug. These behaviors show steroids' addictive potential. Research has found that some steroid users turn to other drugs, such as opioids, to reduce sleep problems and irritability caused by steroids. People who abuse steroids may go through withdrawal symptoms such as mood swings, fatigue, restlessness, loss of appetite, sleep problems, decrease of sex drive, and steroid cravings.

== See also ==
- Steroid use in baseball
- Doping in the United States
- Doping in sport
- List of suspensions in the NFL
