= Barry Bonds perjury case =

Case of alleged perjury

The Barry Bonds perjury case was a case of alleged perjury regarding use of anabolic steroids by former San Francisco Giants outfielder and all-time Major League Baseball (MLB) career home run leader, Barry Bonds, and the related investigations surrounding these accusations. On April 13, 2011, Bonds was convicted of one felony count of obstruction of justice for giving an incomplete answer to a question in grand jury testimony. A mistrial was declared on the remaining three counts of perjury, and those charges were dropped. The obstruction of justice conviction was upheld by an appellate panel in 2013, but a larger panel of the appellate court exonerated him in 2015 by a 10–1 vote.

== BALCO scandal ==
In 2003, Greg Anderson of the Bay Area Laboratory Co-operative (BALCO), Barry Bonds's trainer since 2000, was indicted by a federal grand jury in the United States District Court for the Northern District of California and charged with supplying anabolic steroids to athletes, including a number of baseball players. That led to speculation that Bonds had used performance-enhancing drugs while there was no mandatory testing in Major League Baseball. Bonds declared his innocence, attributing his changed physique and increased power to a strict regimen of bodybuilding, diet and legitimate supplements.

During grand jury testimony on December 4, 2003, Bonds said that he used a clear substance and a cream that he received from his personal strength trainer, Greg Anderson, who told him they were the nutritional supplement flaxseed oil and a rubbing balm for arthritis. This testimony was released to the San Francisco Chronicle by Troy Ellerman, a defense lawyer for Victor Conte. (Ellerman pleaded guilty to disclosing sealed grand jury testimony on February 14, 2007.) Later reports on Bonds’ leaked grand-jury testimony contend that he admitted to unknowingly using "the clear," a form of the designer steroid THG and "the cream", a concoction designed to mask certain hormone ratios helping the user to beat drug tests.

In August 2005, all four defendants in the BALCO steroid scandal trial, including Anderson, struck deals with federal prosecutors that did not require them to reveal names of athletes who may have used banned drugs.

== Perjury investigation ==
CNN reported that federal investigators were looking into whether or not Bonds committed perjury during his 2003 grand jury testimony relating to the BALCO steroids scandal when he testified that he believed a clear substance and a cream, given to him by personal trainer Greg Anderson, were flaxseed oil and arthritis balm. The United States Attorney's Office in San Francisco brought evidence before another grand jury to determine if Bonds should be indicted. Before testifying to the original grand jury (in 2003), witnesses including Bonds were told that they could not be charged with any crime other than perjury based on their testimony. On July 5, 2006, Anderson was found in contempt of court by U.S. District Judge William Alsup for refusing to testify before the grand jury investigating perjury accusations against Bonds. Anderson was denied bail and immediately sent to the Federal Correctional Institution in Dublin, California.

Anderson's attorney, Mark Geragos, said he would file an appeal based on his assertion that the subpoena to testify violated Anderson's plea bargain agreement in the BALCO case. Later that month, the grand jury investigating the incident retired without issuing an indictment. Anderson was immediately released and promptly subpoenaed to testify before a new grand jury that would take up the case. Geragos stated that his client would continue to refuse to testify.

Days later, federal prosecutors obtained Bonds’ medical files as part of their perjury investigation. Bonds’ former girlfriend, Kimberly Bell, testified that Bonds blamed an elbow injury on steroid use. According to the San Francisco Chronicle, prosecutors had subpoenaed the documents nearly two months earlier, but Bonds’ attorneys went to federal court to stop the government from obtaining them.

On August 17, 2006, Anderson again refused to testify before the grand jury investigating Bonds. Judge Alsup ordered Anderson to return to court August 28 for a contempt hearing. In requesting the hearing, prosecutors for the first time publicly acknowledged they were targeting Bonds. Anderson was held in contempt of court at the August 28 hearing and sent to federal prison for a second time. Judge Alsup said Anderson had provided no legal justification for refusing to tell the grand jury on August 17 whether he had supplied steroids to Bonds or other athletes, or even whether he knew Bonds. Geragos said he would file an appeal with the Ninth U.S. Circuit Court of Appeals. Anderson was released from prison on October 5, after serving 37 days. Judge Alsup ordered his release because the federal appeals court hadn't affirmed the contempt order within the required 30 days after Anderson was jailed. The 9th U.S. Circuit Court of Appeal had sent the contempt order back to Judge Alsup, thus delaying any ruling.

The main contention of Anderson's appeal is that a secret, illegally recorded tape of him discussing Bonds' steroid use was the basis for the grand jury questions he refused to answer. Prosecutors, however, said the tape was legal and was made in a face-to-face meeting with Anderson. Although Judge Alsup dismissed Anderson's tape claim and others, the 9th Circuit Court sent Anderson's appeal back to the judge, saying Alsup's ruling regarding the tape was not clear enough. In clarifying his order, Alsup said he agreed with prosecutors that there was ample evidence beyond the tape to question Anderson. Prosecutors also said the questions they wanted answered were based on athletes' secret testimony in the Bay Area Laboratory Co-Operative case and a search of Anderson's house that turned up drug records, some with Bonds' name on it. Other than the tape dispute, the 9th Circuit Court had rejected the merits of Anderson's appeal.

In November, after the order was clarified, the 9th Circuit Court agreed to hear Anderson's argument that his "entire grand jury process was tainted" because the government let the grand jury hear the tape. If the appeals court had agreed that the tape unfairly contributed to Anderson's guilty plea, his conviction could have been thrown out, even though Anderson had already completed his three-month sentence. In the disputed tape recording, first reported by the San Francisco Chronicle, Anderson reportedly told an unidentified person that Bonds was using drugs which could not be detected. Judge Alsup, who had read a transcript of the tape, called it "as worthless a piece of evidence as I've ever seen", according to newspaper reports.

On November 16, the 9th Circuit Court rejected Anderson's appeal and ruled that he must return to prison for refusing to testify before the grand jury investigating Bonds. The court ordered him to report to the Federal Correctional Institution in Dublin by November 20. The court agreed with Judge Alsup, ruling there was ample evidence beyond the tape to justify the grand jury's interest in questioning Anderson about Bonds. Anderson's lawyers announced they would seek an appeal before the entire 9th Circuit Court.

In January 2007, U.S. attorney Kevin V. Ryan resigned and was replaced by Scott Schools. Despite rumors the probe into Bonds would be hampered, the Associated Press reported that by February 2007, the investigation had resumed. The AP quoted Michael Rains, a lawyer for Bonds, as saying "There is absolutely no doubt that the U.S. attorney is still running a grand jury and still taking evidence that involves Bonds. There is still an active effort to indict Barry." The 9th Circuit Court rejected Anderson's appeal in March, and Geragos stated that he intended to appeal to the U.S. Supreme Court. After losing the appeal, Geragos told ESPN "My client is never going to speak...He has got absolutely no intention of talking."

On July 21, the New York Daily News reported that the grand jury investigating Bonds had been extended for six months. According to the Daily News, the "U.S. Attorney's office in San Francisco is confident it will have enough evidence to secure an indictment once [the grand jury] resumes in September." The Daily News quoted an anonymous source as saying, "[Prosecutors] seem to feel they have a strong case... If the case is 90% now, there's no reason not to go for 100%. They aren't just waiting around for Greg Anderson."

A month later, Bonds hired two attorneys, John Burris of Oakland and Todd Schneider of San Francisco, to defend him against what he claimed were false public statements made against him, including claims that he took steroids. The move was chiefly aimed at Boston Red Sox pitcher Curt Schilling, who made disparaging remarks about Bonds in an HBO interview with sportscaster Bob Costas. Bonds dismissed Schilling's comments.

== Federal indictment ==
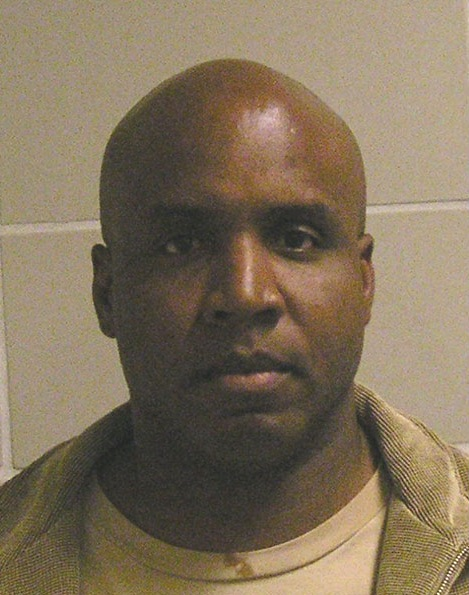
Mug shot of Bonds taken on November 15, 2007.

On November 15, 2007, a federal grand jury returned an indictment against Bonds. He was charged with four counts of perjury and one count of obstruction of justice. "During the criminal investigation, evidence was obtained including positive tests for the presence of anabolic steroids and other performance enhancing substances for Bonds and other athletes," the indictment reads. The charges focus on Bonds' responses to the grand jury in his 2003 testimony, specifically his denials when asked if he had used steroids, and whether Anderson had administered steroids to him. The Giants, Major League Baseball and its players' union all expressed sadness at the indictment, and even the White House weighed in, calling it a "sad day in baseball".

Hours after Bonds was indicted, Greg Anderson was ordered released from prison. Anderson's attorney, Mark Geragos, denied his client had testified before the grand jury and expressed outrage Anderson had been imprisoned, telling the New York Daily News, "They kept Greg in prison a year. I read the indictment and there is nothing that the government didn't have a year ago to indict Bonds. My guy was nonessential." Geragos also told the Daily News that Anderson would not testify at trial against Bonds if he is called, adding "They would have to indict him [on civil contempt charges] first."

Bonds pleaded not guilty on December 7, 2007, and was freed on bond while awaiting trial. On January 23, 2008, Bonds filed a motion to dismiss the indictment, asserting that the charges are vague and allege more than one offense in each count, which may violate his constitutional rights. In a response from the government on February 14, 2008, prosecutors stated that they would present evidence at trial showing that Bonds tested positive for steroids in November 2000.

== Trial ==
Bonds's trial was set for March 2, 2009, but delayed by appeals, after the judge excluded drugs tests and other evidence that could not be specifically tied to Bonds without the testimony of Greg Anderson, who is alleged to have provided steroids to Barry Bonds when he was Bonds personal trainer and linked to Bay Area Laboratory Co-operative (BALCO). Law professor Peter Keane called the prosecutors' move a blunder, although an account by another published attorney disagreed. In June 2010, however, the 9th Circuit U.S. Court of Appeals ruled that the evidence should be excluded. On August 7, 2010, it was reported that U.S. District Judge Susan Illston of San Francisco had rescheduled the trial for March 21, 2011. On Friday, December 17, 2010, it was reported that attorneys for Bonds, citing the appeals court ruling, filed papers asking the judge to forbid testimony of current and former baseball players linked to BALCO or the steroids scandal, and not to permit use of Anderson's drug ledgers and calendars, as well as other documents from BALCO which the prosecution was seeking to use at the trial in spite of the appeals court ruling. On January 10, 2011, lawyers for Bonds filed additional papers asking the judge not to permit use of Anderson as a witness by the prosecution (since, given his previous unwillingness to testify, it was presumed he would again decline), nor to allow prosecutors to tell the jury about any refusal of Anderson to testify, nor permit use of a reported tape of Anderson talking to Steve Hoskins, previously a business manager of Bonds. The judge had already excluded evidence which could not be connected to Bonds because of Anderson's refusal to testify about his alleged knowledge of Bonds' alleged connection to the evidence. The same applies to several other pieces of evidence, which Bonds' attorneys asked to be excluded in the January 10, 2011 filing. A hearing was set to be held on the exclusion of the testimony and the additional evidence on January 21, 2011. A report in the New York Times had earlier suggested it was likely that Bonds would not get prison time even if convicted, after pro cyclist Tammy Thomas received house arrest and probation for similar crimes in the BALCO scandal, in a case decided by the very same judge presiding over the Bonds case.

Bonds' trial began on Monday March 21, 2011. The case was prosecuted by Assistant United States Attorneys Matthew Parrella and Jeffrey Nedrow. The defense team consisted of 8 lawyers. Allen Ruby, a partner at Skadden Arps Slate Meagher & Flom LLP, served as the lead attorney and was assisted by Sean Contain and Patrick Hammon. Cris Arguedas, of Arguedas Cassman & Headley, served as second chair and was assisted by Ted Cassman and Michael Anderson. Appellate lawyers Dennis Riordan and Don Horgan drafted pre-trial motions and attended the trial in order to brief appellate issues in real time.

Witnesses included Jeff Novitzky, Former I.R.S Agent who conducted the BALCO money laundering investigation, which led to the discovery of illicit steroid sales; Steve Hoskins, Bonds' former personal assistant; Larry Bowers, chemist from United States Anti-Doping Agency specializing in detecting drugs in blood and urine samples; Kimberly Bell, Bonds' former mistress; Mike Murphy, the Giant's equipment manager; Stan Conte; former Giants trainer; and Marvin Benard, Jason Giambi, and Jeremy Giambi, baseball players who acquired steroids from Greg Anderson.

On April 13, 2011, a jury found Bonds guilty on the felony charge of obstructing justice. U.S. District Judge Susan Illston declared a mistrial on the three perjury charges, as the jury was unable to come to a unanimous verdict.

Case number is U.S. v. Bonds, 07–00732, U.S. District Court, Northern District of California (San Francisco). Released documents of the case have been posted online.

== Sentencing ==
On December 15, 2011, Bonds was sentenced to 30 days of house arrest, two years of probation and 250 hours of community service, for an obstruction of justice conviction stemming from a grand jury appearance in 2003. However, U.S. District Judge Susan Illston then delayed the sentence pending his appeal.

== Appeal ==
On February 13, 2013, a three judge panel of the U.S. Court of Appeals for the Ninth Circuit heard the appeal to overturn Bonds's conviction for Obstruction of Justice. On September 13 of that year, the Ninth Circuit upheld Bonds's conviction. Judge Mary M. Schroeder, writing for the three judge panel, found that Bonds's responses regarding his answers regarding receiving injections were evasive and obstructed justice. "When factually true statements are misleading or evasive, they can prevent the grand jury from obtaining truthful and responsive answers. They may therefore obstruct and impede the administration of justice." According to Bonds's lawyers, he answered all questions truthfully and to the satisfaction of the prosecutor, and it is the first known obstruction guilty verdict based on truthful testimony under oath.

An en banc panel of the Ninth Circuit Court heard oral arguments on Bonds's motion to reconsider the panel ruling on September 18, 2014. On April 22, 2015, the en banc panel of the Ninth Circuit Court of Appeals overturned Bonds' conviction by a 10–1 vote. A short per curiam opinion characterized Bonds' statement as "a rambling, non-responsive answer to a simple question" and found that there was "insufficient evidence" that the statement was material to the investigation, requiring reversal of the conviction. The court also held that the reversal implicated Bonds' double jeopardy rights, meaning that he cannot be retried on the charge. Several groups of judges added separate opinions stating additional rationales for the reversal.

Recording of oral arguments in front of the three judge panel.

Recording of oral arguments in front of the en banc panel
