= BALCO scandal =

2002 use of banned substances by US athletes

The BALCO scandal was a scandal involving the use of banned performance-enhancing substances by professional athletes.

The Bay Area Laboratory Co-operative (BALCO) was a San Francisco Bay Area business which supplied anabolic steroids to professional athletes. In 2002 the US federal government investigated the laboratory.

== History of BALCO ==
Founded in 1984 by Victor Conte and his first wife Aubry, BALCO began as Millbrae Holistic, a vitamin shop in Millbrae, California. Initially a business venture to keep food on the table, only one year after opening, Victor Conte closed Millbrae Holistic and started BALCO as a sport supplement company in neighboring Burlingame. Investing in an ICP spectrometer, Conte used his knowledge of nutrition, largely self-taught, to devise a system of testing athletes for mineral deficiencies in order to maintain a perfect balance of minerals in the body. Through regular urine and blood testing, Conte would monitor and treat mineral shortages in athletes, supposedly elevating their level of physical wellness dramatically. Surviving his divorce from Aubry and several years of financial hardships, BALCO did not achieve professional success until the summer of 1996 with the addition of NFL linebacker Bill Romanowski to its client list. From there, Conte began acquiring additional high-profile athletes with a special concoction of undetectable drugs assembled by Illinois chemist Patrick Arnold and distributed by personal trainer Greg Anderson.

== Drugs distributed ==
Arnold combined a wide range of substances, that when used in a cycle could go relatively undetected by drug testing, even on the Olympic level. Five different types of drugs along with mineral supplements were used to achieve optimum results. Types of drugs included erythropoietin, human growth hormone, modafinil, testosterone cream, and tetrahydrogestrinone.

- Erythropoietin (EPO) is a hormone naturally produced by the kidneys that stimulates erythropoiesis. Originally used to treat anemia, when artificially introduced to the body, EPO stimulates an increased production of red blood cells, enhancing the body's ability to transport oxygen.
- Human growth hormone (HGH) is secreted by the anterior pituitary and is generally anabolic. In theory, this hormone builds muscle mass, although some studies suggest it has no effect on building muscle mass to a degree that would benefit athletes.
- Modafinil is a mild stimulant designed to be taken before competition in order to sharpen an athlete's senses and performance. Legally marketed as a treatment for narcolepsy and sleep disorders, modafinil is not regarded as a high-risk drug by athletic governing bodies, but is still banned from competition.
- Testosterone Cream or "The Cream" is a salve that when rubbed on the body introduces testosterone, trimming body fat and building muscle. Though less effective than testosterone injections, "The Cream" was widely used because it did not cause a significant rise in normal testosterone levels when scrutinized by a drug test.
- Tetrahydrogestrinone, THG, or "The Clear," is a designer anabolic steroid that provides the same effects to the user as testosterone or other anabolic steroids, that is, making muscles bigger and stronger. THG was the main steroid distributed by BALCO, with the other products more of a regimen to heighten its effects in accordance with an individual athlete's requirements.

== BALCO investigation ==
Victor Conte, Arnold and Anderson continued selling these substances undetected from 1988 to 2002 when the official federal investigation of BALCO began. Parallel with this investigation, the United States Anti-Doping Agency (USADA) began its own covert investigation of Conte and his operation. In the summer of 2003, USADA investigators received a syringe with trace amounts of a mysterious substance. The anonymous tipster was Trevor Graham, sprint coach to Marion Jones and Tim Montgomery.

The syringe went to Don Catlin, MD, the founder and then-director of the UCLA Olympic Analytical Laboratory, who had developed a testing process for the substance, tetrahydrogestrinone (THG). Later that year, the Chicago Tribune named Catlin Sportsman of the Year.

He tested 550 existing samples from athletes, of which 20 proved positive for THG.

Athletes including Kelli White, British sprinter Dwain Chambers, shot putter Kevin Toth, middle-distance runner Regina Jacobs, and hammer throwers John McEwen and Melissa Price were subsequently incriminated in the investigation.

=== Jason Giambi ===
The former American League MVP admitted to steroid use as well as HGH use in front of a grand jury in December 2003. Jason Giambi first became connected with BALCO after inquiring with Greg Anderson about Barry Bonds' training regimen. The much publicized leak of court documents which were said to contain this admission led to a tarnishing of Giambi's career, yet because he never actually failed a drug test, Giambi has, thus far, avoided punishment from Major League Baseball. Giambi subsequently made a few apologies to the media, the most direct of which may have come on May 16, 2007, when he told USA Today, "I was wrong for using that stuff...what we should have done a long time ago was stand up — players, ownership, everybody - and said 'we made a mistake.'" His younger brother Jeremy, a fellow major leaguer and former teammate of Giambi's on the Oakland Athletics, was also involved in receiving supplements from BALCO, and admitted using steroids during his career.

=== Barry Bonds ===
Barry Bonds, the former San Francisco Giants outfielder, who holds the major league records for home runs in both a single season and a career, has never been caught explicitly using steroids and has steadfastly denied any allegations against him. Critics of Bonds pointed to his large increase in size late in his career, as well as his improvement primarily in his power numbers, despite his age. Bonds's trainer, Greg Anderson, was sentenced to jail time after refusing to testify against Bonds before a grand jury investigating the slugger for perjury. Lance Williams and Mark Fainaru-Wada, reporters for the San Francisco Chronicle, profiled Bonds' alleged use of performance-enhancing substances in their 2006 book Game of Shadows. The reporters used Bonds' testimony in front of a grand jury, and refused to reveal their source for the court documents. The U.S. government sought charges against them for leaking the testimony, but dropped them when a former attorney for Conte pleaded guilty to doing so.

Bonds, like Giambi, has never been punished by the MLB in any way because he has not yet failed any drug test. However, neither he nor Giambi has been elected to the National Baseball Hall of Fame, despite Bonds being at or near the top in several career statistical categories, such as home runs and wins above replacement, two statistics that the voters take into serious consideration. The general consensus around baseball is that it is his alleged use of steroids and role in the BALCO scandal that has led the Baseball Writers' Association of America (BWAA) hall of fame voters to not include him on their ballots despite his incredibly productive career.

On November 15, 2007, Bonds was indicted for perjury and obstruction of justice based on his grand jury testimony in this investigation. The trial began on March 21, 2011; he was convicted on April 13, 2011, on a single charge of obstruction of justice; the other charges were dismissed. In 2015, Bonds' conviction was overturned by a 10–1 vote of an en banc panel of the United States Court of Appeals for the Ninth Circuit.

=== Marion Jones ===
Marion Jones was a track and field athlete who won five medals, three gold, at the 2000 Summer Olympics in Sydney, Australia. Jones attended the University of North Carolina on a basketball scholarship, but eventually shifted her focus solely to track. It was there she met shot-putter and then UNC coach C. J. Hunter, whom she married in 1998 and eventually divorced in 2002. A former world champion, Hunter, also involved with BALCO, was disgraced after being caught using performance-enhancing drugs. The publicity surrounding this led many to believe Jones used such drugs as well, an accusation she vehemently denied repeatedly. Jones then began a relationship with American sprinter Tim Montgomery, leading to the birth of a son. Montgomery benefited from the banned substances he received from BALCO — he, as well as Jones and Hunter, can still be seen posing with Conte in photos on his SNAC Web site — and the one-time 100 meter dash world record holder has been stripped of his awards and records since admitting to steroid use, and is now retired. After news of Montgomery's cheating broke, Jones was again faced with increased doubt as to the integrity of her career, yet she continued to deny any wrongdoing. Finally, in October 2007, Jones admitted to lying to federal agents about her use of performance-enhancing drugs, though she still maintains she believed the substances she was using were flaxseed oil, not steroids, at the time. Jones has handed over the five Olympic medals she earned in Sydney and officially retired from the sport.

=== Bill Romanowski ===
The most notable football player involved in the BALCO scandal is two-time All-Pro linebacker Bill Romanowski. The 16-year NFL veteran openly advertised Conte's zinc supplement ZMA, stating: "I've got about 90 percent of the Broncos on ZMA. The guys are telling me they sleep better and feel better!" His involvement with BALCO only further tainted the career of the four-time Super Bowl champion. Romanowski has also been accused of using other performance-enhancing drugs, such as HGH, a drug banned by the federal government.

== Media coverage of scandal ==
The media coverage of the BALCO case was extensive. The San Francisco Chronicle and more specifically Chronicle journalists Mark Fainaru-Wada and Lance Williams, have played a prominent role in covering the story, ultimately collaborating in Game of Shadows, a book chronicling the BALCO scandal.

Fainaru-Wada and Williams broke the story concerning U.S. track coach Trevor Graham and his admission to turning a syringe laced with THG over to investigators. That syringe was the catalyst for the entire investigation of Conte's lab. These journalists also wrote the story about C.J. Hunter (Marion Jones’ ex-husband) and his interview with an IRS agent, in which Hunter told the agents that Jones was taking performance-enhancing drugs during the 2000 Olympic Games in Sydney. Hunter said that at times, he injected the drugs into Jones himself. He also admitted to taking steroids, and said that he had obtained them through Conte.

The duo's most groundbreaking story, however, was their report on October 16, 2004, of a secret audio conversation that contained Greg Anderson (Barry Bonds’ trainer) stating that Bonds had been using steroids provided by Victor Conte and himself. Anderson also revealed the names of numerous Olympic athletes that had been provided with "The Clear", boasting that neither they nor Bonds would fail drug tests because the substance was undetectable.

After reporting on the BALCO case, Fainaru-Wada and Williams took their interviews and observations and published Game of Shadows, a journalistic book that explored every aspect of BALCO, beginning with Conte's early struggles as an aspiring musician and ending with the federal bust of the BALCO headquarters. Publicly, most of the attention the book received was due to the incriminating evidence of Barry Bond's ties to BALCO.

== Impact of BALCO scandal ==
Prior to the scandal, Major League Baseball had no established policy against steroids. As a result of the BALCO bust, commissioner Bud Selig instituted a written, league-wide policy. The first time a player fails a test for steroids, he is subject to an 81-game (about 1/2 of a regular season) suspension. For the second offense, the penalty is a 162 (a regular season) game suspension. Finally, if a third offense occurs, the player is given a lifetime ban from Major League Baseball.

== BALCO's Legacy ==
Victor Conte pled guilty in 2005 and served four months in prison. He later ran another supplement business, Scientific Nutrition for Advanced Conditioning (SNAC). Patrick Arnold and Greg Anderson each served a three-month jail sentence after pleading guilty, with Anderson serving an additional three-month house arrest sentence. In 2006, Anderson was incarcerated again after being found in contempt of court for refusing to testify about Barry Bonds' and Gary Sheffield's alleged use of banned steroids.

== See also ==
- Doping in Russia
- Doping in the United States
