= Tammy Thomas =

American cyclist

Tammy Thomas (born 11 January 1970) is an American former sprint track cyclist, who won a silver medal at the 2001 UCI Track Cycling World Championships in the individual sprint event. However, her career was ended after she was caught using anabolic steroids.

== Early life and career ==
The Mississippi-born Thomas graduated from Mississippi State University in 1992. She took up track cycling in 1995, and trained under coaches Carlos Laborde and Desmond Dickie. Years later, Thomas claimed that she began doping under Laborde's influence.

== Doping ==
Thomas was plagued by allegations of doping for most of her career. However, they exploded onto the public stage when she won the 2000 Olympic 500-meter track cycling time trial over Chris Witty in April 2000. As she stood on the podium alongside Witty, she had a noticeable five o'clock shadow, an Adam's apple on her neck, a broad jaw line and hair growing in the wrong places. According to a post-mortem by USA Today, virtually "the only tangible evidence of her womanhood" was her trademark red nail polish.

The beginning of the end came a month later, when Thomas tested positive for steroids just before a race in Mexico City. Although she later won the race, her positive test result meant that regardless of the actual outcome, Witty would be appointed to the US Olympic team. By this time, according to former United States Olympic Committee drug control head Wade Exum, Thomas tested positive for testosterone at least six times, some with levels high enough that she should have been sent to the hospital.

In August, USA Cycling and the USOC sought to have Thomas banned from competition based on four positive tests between July 1999 and April 2000. Thomas convinced an arbitrator to void Witty's appointment and set a ride-off for August 20 between Thomas and Witty. Although Witty didn't show up for the ride-off, Thomas tested positive for elevated testosterone levels once again. Facing an untenable situation, Thomas agreed to a settlement in which she ceded the Olympic slot to Witty in return for a one-year ban from competition.

Thomas returned to cycling in 2001, and got in touch with Patrick Arnold, an organic chemist known for introducing a number of synthetic steroids into the market, including one that he created himself, THG ("the clear"). From 2000 to 2002, Arnold supplied her with drugs every few months–including her silver medal run at the 2001 UCI Track Cycling World Championships. However, her career all but ended on March 14, 2002, when she tested positive for an anabolic steroid during an out-of-competition test conducted by the United States Anti-Doping Agency. Anti-doping specialist Don Catlin identified the substance in Thomas' sample as norboletone, a previously unknown steroid. On August 31, 2002; USADA banned Thomas from cycling for life.

Catlin's discovery triggered a federal investigation into the source of the norboletone in Thomas' system, which ultimately led to the Bay Area Laboratory Co-operative, a company that supplied steroids to athletes. As the BALCO scandal mushroomed, investigators for the Internal Revenue Service questioned Thomas in hopes of proving a direct link between the steroid and BALCO. However, when she appeared before a grand jury, Thomas claimed Arnold only gave her legal supplements because these substances were not illegal according to federal statute. University of Colorado endocrinologist Margaret Wiseman testified that when she examined Thomas, she had "very masculine" body features. In 2006, she was indicted on six counts of perjury and obstruction of justice. She was convicted on two of those counts in 2008 and sentenced to five years' probation, six months' house arrest, and 500 hours of community service. The conviction ended her hopes of becoming a lawyer; most states do not grant a law license to convicted felons.

=== Aftermath ===
Thomas remained defiant for some years after her lifetime ban. However, in a 2013 interview with USA Today, she expressed remorse for doping, and also claimed that she was sexually abused by Laborde and Dickie. While most of the male characteristics triggered by her steroid use have receded, she was left physically weaker than her parents. She also suffered from chronic fatigue, depression, anxiety and sleep disorders, conditions that will only get worse with age. Without health insurance, she sometimes had to skip the medicines she must take to deal with the steroid-related problems and is unable to afford the "intensive therapy" she felt she needed long term.

In 2017, USADA reduced Thomas' ban from competition to time served, citing her advocacy against doping and remorse for her actions.
