= Randy Velarde =

American baseball player (born 1962)

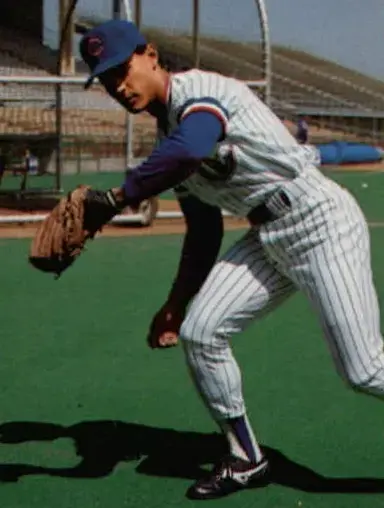
- Velarde with the Columbus Clippers c. 1988
- Infielder
- Born: November 24, 1962 (age 63); Midland, Texas, U.S.
- Batted: Right Threw: Right

MLB debut
- August 20, 1987, for the New York Yankees

Last MLB appearance
- September 29, 2002, for the Oakland Athletics

MLB statistics
- Batting average: .276
- Home runs: 100
- Runs batted in: 445
- Stats at Baseball Reference

Teams
- New York Yankees (1987–1995); California / Anaheim Angels (1996–1999); Oakland Athletics (1999–2000); Texas Rangers (2001); New York Yankees (2001); Oakland Athletics (2002)

Randy Lee Velarde (born November 24, 1962) is an American former baseball infielder and utility player who played 16 seasons in Major League Baseball (MLB). He played the majority of his career for the New York Yankees, and also played for the California/Anaheim Angels, Oakland Athletics and Texas Rangers from 1987 to 2002. Although he primarily played as a utility infielder, Velarde was utilized in the outfield as well.

Velarde played college baseball at the Church of Christ-affiliated Lubbock Christian University in Lubbock, Texas, from 1982 until 1985, when he was drafted by the Chicago White Sox. He was subsequently traded to the New York Yankees, where he spent the majority of his career. Velarde is best known for turning the eleventh unassisted triple play in Major League Baseball history on May 29, 2000.

== Early life ==
Velarde was born in Midland, Texas, on November 24, 1962, and is of Mexican American descent. He attended college at Lubbock Christian University, where he played four seasons of baseball. However, he was not drafted by any Major League team until his senior year.

== Professional career ==
=== Draft and minor leagues ===
Velarde was selected in the 19th round of the 1985 amateur draft by the Chicago White Sox. He joined the New York Yankees in 1987, when the White Sox traded him with Pete Filson in exchange for Scott Nielsen and Mike Soper. Velarde made his debut in 1987, but spent the next two seasons dividing his playing time between the Class AAA Columbus Clippers of the International League and the Yankees.

=== New York Yankees (1987–1995) ===
Velarde became the Yankees utility player in 1990, playing second base, shortstop, third base and left field. Becoming the most shuffled player on the Yankee roster appeared to have a negative effect on Velarde's offense, as he batted .210 in 95 games. In spring training of 1991, he competed with Mike Blowers and Jim Leyritz for the position of third base, where he started in the May 1 game against the Oakland Athletics in which Rickey Henderson broke Lou Brock's all-time stolen base record. In 1992, he established himself as the everyday shortstop for the organization. However, he was always considered a utility player and subsequently reverted to the role, his versatility being cited as his main asset in contrast to his unreliable defense and lack of slugging prowess. Despite this, Velarde ended up batting .301 and .279 in 1993 and strike-shortened 1994 seasons, respectively.

In 1993, Velarde started games at shortstop, third base, left field and center field and in the following season, he became the second-longest tenured Yankee player behind team captain Don Mattingly. He became a free agent at the end of the season for the first time in his career and re-signed with the Yankees for a one-year, $350,000 contract plus incentives, even though he was given a higher offer by other teams. Velarde's willingness to play in any position and his loyalty to the team prompted his manager, Buck Showalter, to call him "the epitome of a team player." In 1995, his final season with the Yankees, Velarde spent most of his time playing second base and though his batting average during the regular season was .278, he batted a disappointing .176 during the postseason. He again became a free agent at the end of the season.

=== Remainder of career (1996–2002) ===
Though Velarde was keen to remain with the Yankees (the only team he had played for up to this point), they turned down his request for a three-year contract. He reluctantly departed and signed a three-year, $2.45 million contract with the California Angels. He played only one game in 1997, as he was forced to miss the entire season due to injury. After more than three seasons with the Angels, Velarde was traded to the Oakland Athletics in the middle of the 1999 season. That year, he finished fourth in the American League in hits (200) and second in assists (493), while his season totals in batting average (.317), runs (105), hits, triples (7), home runs (16), runs batted in (76), stolen bases (24) and on-base percentage (.390) are all personal bests. He also became the sixth player in Major League history to amass 200 hits in a single season while playing for two different teams, and the first since Willie Montañez in 1976.

In his second season with the Athletics, Velarde turned an unassisted triple play against the Yankees, his former team, on May 29 in the bottom of the 6th inning. Velarde caught a line drive off of the bat of Shane Spencer, tagged Jorge Posada coming from first base, and touched second base to put out Tino Martinez. It was the eleventh time that such a play had been executed and Velarde became only the third second baseman to accomplish the feat Velarde rejoined the Yankees in the middle of the 2001 season after a short stint with the Texas Rangers. He acknowledged that he had made a mistake when he departed the Yankees in 1995 in order to become an everyday player and vowed to "redeem the part of the career [he] missed." He ended up appearing in the 2001 World Series, where the Yankees lost to the Arizona Diamondbacks in seven games. Though he played the majority of his career with the Yankees, Velarde never won a World Series ring with the team. This was partially due to bad timing; the Yankees won the World Series the year after Velarde left and lost the World Series the season he returned, while winning four championships while he was away.

Velarde rejoined the Oakland Athletics for the 2002 season before retiring.

=== Career statistics ===
In 1,273 games over 16 seasons, Velarde posted a .276 batting average (1171-for-4244) with 633 runs, 214 doubles, 23 triples, 100 home runs, 445 RBI, 78 stolen bases, 463 bases on balls, .352 on-base percentage and .408 slugging percentage. He finished his career with a .970 fielding percentage playing primarily at second and third base and shortstop. He also has played at first base and all three outfield positions. In 18 postseason games, he hit .235 (12-for-51) with 6 runs, 2 doubles, 5 RBI, and 9 walks.

=== Use of performance-enhancing drugs ===
Velarde was one of several players named in the Mitchell Report, which was released on December 13, 2007. Velarde said that he used the drugs while a member of the Oakland A's. Through his lawyer, he admitted that he had used "the cream" and "the clear," both of which were supplied to him by Greg Anderson. Velarde later testified in the Barry Bonds perjury case, stating that he purchased performance-enhancing drugs from and was injected with human growth hormone by Anderson, who was Bonds' personal trainer.

== See also ==
- List of Major League Baseball players named in the Mitchell Report
