= Christos Tzekos =

Greek athletics coach

Christos Tzekos (or Tsekos) is a Greek athletics coach.

He was the trainer of the sprinters Konstantinos Kenteris and Ekaterini Thanou. The three were at the center of a huge doping scandal at the start of the 2004 Summer Olympics. The athletes were suspended by the IAAF in December 2004 but have been free to compete since December, 2006. Tsekos is serving a 4-year suspension handed down by the Greek athletics federation in 2005.

Tsekos, a former nutritional supplements salesman who lives alternatingly in his native Greece and his adopted home in Lincolnwood, Illinois (a suburb of Chicago), had been involved in a number of doping-related incidents before.

In 1997, at an athletics event in Dortmund, Germany, a row occurred between Tsekos and an IAAF doping controller whom he prevented from testing four of his athletes, among them Thanou and Charis Papadias. However, the doping controller, Klaus Wengoborski, arrived with no identification and without a female official accompanying him, a violation of IAAF regulations at the time. The Greek federation nevertheless suspended Tzekos but no action was taken against the athletes. The IAAF agreed with the Greek federation's ruling.

The Greek national health authority fined Tsekos 14.800 euros for illegally importing anabolic substances. In 2004 a raid on his office uncovered 1400 ampoules containing anabolic and other prohibited substances. Some sources say that these were just supplements without the appropriate legal papers for import in Greece.

According to To Vima, a respected Greek daily newspaper, Tsekos had proposed a secret program to the Greek government in 1997, which was projected at a cost of 6 million euros and was intended to provide 150 Greek athletes with non-detectable doping substances in preparation for the 2004 Olympic Games. The government declined the offer. Tzekos had also stated on Greek TV channel Antenna that he has great admiration for the GDR sports program.

In 2003, it was reported that U.S. authorities found e-mails by Victor Conte addressed to Tzekos while searching BALCO (Bay Area Laboratory Co-operative), the California company secretly dealing Tetrahydrogestrinone, an anabolic steroid specially designed so as to make it undetectable under normal drug testing. In addition, according to the respected French paper "L'Equipe," Tzekos was directly dealing with the creator of norbolethone and THG (tetrahydrogestrinone) Patrick Arnold, the father of pro-hormone craze and some undetectable designer steroids.

However, in September 2007, Greek prosecutors ruled there was no evidence supporting any connection between Tzekos and BALCO, after examining evidence sent from the district attorney of northern California. Tzekos has also continued to insist that he only knew Patrick Arnold as a supplier of nutritional supplements, and has denied receiving illegal substances from him.

== See also ==
- Doping (sport)
- List of sporting scandals
