= Game of Shadows =

Book by Mark Fainaru-Wada and Lance Williams

- Author: Mark Fainaru-Wada; Lance Williams
- Subject: Barry Bonds, doping
- Published: March 23, 2006
- Publisher: Gotham Books
- Media type: Print (Hardcover & Paperback)
- Pages: 332 pp.
- ISBN: 978-1-59240-199-4
- OCLC: 718698993
- Dewey Decimal: 362.29
- LC Class: RC1230 .F35 2006

Game of Shadows: Barry Bonds, BALCO, and the Steroids Scandal that Rocked Professional Sports is a non-fiction book published on March 23, 2006, and written by Mark Fainaru-Wada and Lance Williams, reporters for the San Francisco Chronicle. When Sports Illustrated released excerpts from the book on March 7, it generated considerable publicity because the book chronicles alleged extensive use of performance-enhancing drugs, including several different types of steroids and growth hormones, by San Francisco Giants outfielder Barry Bonds.

== Investigation ==
Fainaru-Wada and Williams conducted a two-year investigation centering on the BALCO sports nutrition center, its founder Victor Conte, and Greg Anderson, who served as a personal trainer (and alleged steroid supplier) for Bonds, Gary Sheffield, and Jason Giambi. In the book, the authors provide a summary of their sources, which include over 200 interviews that were conducted in the course of the investigation and over 1000 documents including affidavits from BALCO investigators and grand jury testimony. Based on their findings, Fainaru-Wada and Williams provide reasons that they believe Bonds and the other athletes decided to start taking steroids, and in some cases they provide detailed outlines of the specific steroid regimens set up by Anderson. Other athletes are implicated in the book, including Benito Santiago, track stars Marion Jones and Tim Montgomery, and NFL linebacker Bill Romanowski.

== Allegations concerning Barry Bonds ==
The book is among the most damaging accounts of reported steroid use by Bonds. According to the authors, Bonds began using stanozolol, the same drug for which Ben Johnson tested positive after winning the 100 meters at the 1988 Summer Olympics, starting in the 1999 season. By 2001, the year Bonds broke Mark McGwire's single-season home run record with 73, he was alleged to be using the following performance-enhancers:

- "The cream and the clear", two designer steroids distributed by BALCO
- Human growth hormone allegedly sold on the black market by cancer patients to whom it was legitimately prescribed
- Insulin, which reportedly enhances the bodybuilding effects of growth hormone
- Testosterone decanoate, a steroid often nicknamed "Mexican beans" or "Red beans"
- Trenbolone, a steroid typically used in livestock, especially cattle
- Stanozolol, sold under the brand name Winstrol

The authors also allege that at other times he used:

- Clomid, a drug normally prescribed for infertility used to restore serum testosterone levels following steroid supplementation
- Deca-Durabolin, a common steroid used by bodybuilders
- Norbolethone, a steroid developed for the meat industry in the 1960s, and tested for treatment of some conditions in humans, but never marketed because of doubts about its safety. This drug was the original foundation of "the clear", which was reformulated at least twice.

According to the book, Bonds was inspired to use steroids after watching McGwire's 1998 home run record chase with Sammy Sosa. He began working with Greg Anderson, who would later be hired by the Giants. Anderson reportedly received the substances at issue from BALCO. He also kept meticulous records of Bonds' program; the authors report that Anderson's records indicate that Bonds took up to 20 pills a day and learned to inject himself. The book also claimed that the Giants chose not to confront Bonds about his change in physical appearance, fearing that they would alienate their star slugger, or worse from the team's standpoint, create a drug scandal immediately before the opening of their new stadium.

Bonds sued the authors and publisher of the book over its use of grand jury documents and tried to block the publishers and authors from profiting from such documents. On March 24, Judge James Warren denied the request, citing free speech protections for the authors and that the lawsuit had little chance for success. On June 12, 2006, Barry Bonds dropped his lawsuit against the authors. Michael Rains, Bonds’ attorney, stated that he dropped the lawsuit because the authors had been subpoenaed to be part of an investigation into who leaked the secret grand jury transcripts, which is what Bonds wanted all along.

On May 5, 2006, Mark Fainaru-Wada and Lance Williams were subpoenaed to testify before a federal grand jury about how they obtained Barry Bonds' leaked grand jury testimony. On May 31, 2006, the authors urged U.S. District Judge Martin Jenkins of San Francisco to excuse them from testifying. This appeal was supported by affidavits from Washington Post reporter Carl Bernstein and Mark Corallo, a former press secretary to former Attorney General John Ashcroft. On August 15, 2006, U.S. District Judge Jeffrey White ordered Fainaru-Wada and Williams to comply with their subpoenas and testify, lest they be held in contempt and incarcerated until such time as they decide to talk or if the grand jury term expires. They may also be freed from this obligation if a higher court blocks the ruling. The reporters have previously stated that they would rather go to jail than testify.

On December 21, 2006, Yahoo! Sports reported that one of Victor Conte's initial defense lawyers, Troy Ellerman, had been targeted by the FBI as a possible source of leaks to unspecified members of the media during the Barry Bonds probe. On December 22, the Associated Press reported that the federal government filed papers on December 21 stating the two Chronicle reporters—and authors of Game of Shadows—should receive the maximum 18 months imprisonment for allegedly leaking grand jury information. On February 14, 2007, Ellerman pleaded guilty to leaking grand jury testimony. In the plea agreement, Ellerman will spend two years in jail and pay a $250,000 fine. The government also dropped their case against Williams and Fainaru-Wada.

== Critical reception ==
Entertainment Weekly called the book "a shocking exposé of the seedy side of pro sports that underscores just how easy it is to cheat." The New York Times called it "devastating", writing that "the book gives the reader minutely detailed accounts of the drug regimens supposedly followed by athletes intent on beating the system."

== See also ==
- Doping in the United States
- Steroids in baseball
