= C19H28O =

The molecular formula C_{19}H_{28}O may refer to:

- Androstenone, or 5α-androst-16-en-3-one
- 5α-Androst-2-ene-17-one
- Androstadienol (5,16-androstadien-3β-ol)
- 4,16-Androstadien-3β-ol
