= Christos Tsekos =

Christos Tsekos may refer to:

- Christos Tzekos, Greek athletics coach.
- Christos Tsekos (basketball), Greek retired national basketball player
