= Mark Geragos =

American criminal defense lawyer (born 1957)

- Born: Mark John Geragos; October 5, 1957 (age 69); Los Angeles, California, U.S.
- Education: Haverford College; Loyola Marymount University
- Occupation: Criminal defense lawyer
- Website: http://www.geragos.com

Mark John Geragos (born October 5, 1957) is an American criminal defense lawyer and the managing partner of the law firm Geragos & Geragos.

== Early life and education ==
Geragos was born in Los Angeles, California, where he attended Flintridge Preparatory School in La Cañada, graduating with honors. He earned his bachelor's degree from Haverford College, in 1979, double-majoring in anthropology and sociology, then his Juris Doctor (J.D.) from Loyola Law School at the Loyola Marymount University in 1982. He was admitted to the State Bar of California in 1983.

An Armenian-American, Geragos maintains a close relationship with the Armenian community. He has earned praise from the Armenian National Committee of America, and serves on the Advisory Committee of Birthright Armenia, as the chairman of Armenian Bone Marrow Donor Registry, and also is involved with the Armenian religious community. He has been a member of the Armenia Fund International Board of Trustees since 2006.

== Career ==
Geragos is the managing partner for the law firm of Geragos & Geragos, where he oversees criminal defense and civil litigation. He was one of the lead lawyers in two groundbreaking federal class action lawsuits against New York Life Insurance and AXA, for insurance policies issued in the early 20th century during the time of the Armenian genocide of more than 1.5 million Armenians. The two cases settled for over $37.5 million, in 2004 and 2005.

In December 2022, Geragos partnered with law colleague and MeidasTouch co-founder Ben Meiselas to form Engine Vision Media and acquire Los Angeles magazine from Hour Media.

=== Office ===
The firm's office is located on Figueroa Street in Downtown Los Angeles in a former Los Angeles Fire Department fire station, Engine Company No. 28, alongside Kabateck LLP. The 1912 building is listed on the National Register of Historic Places listings in Los Angeles and is jointly owned by Geragos and his investment partner, attorney Brian S. Kabateck, since 2007, among other joint acquisitions; the partners have litigated together and also, in recent years, against one another over their mutual investments.

== Notable clients ==
Geragos first garnered national attention after representing convicted Whitewater figure Susan McDougal, the former business partner of former President Bill Clinton. Geragos requested a presidential pardon for McDougal on January 20, 2001, though the decision was entirely up to former President Clinton, pursuant to Article II of the United States' Constitution. Geragos also represented McDougal in a 12-count embezzlement trial in Los Angeles in which the jury returned a not-guilty verdict.

He has since represented many notable clients, including Gary Condit; suspended NASCAR driver Jeremy Mayfield; Scott Peterson; Scott Barney; Roger Clinton Jr.; Lee Tamahori; Kesha, briefly, in her lawsuit against Dr. Luke, until May 2016; and Clare Bronfman. Other notable clients include:

- Winona Ryder – In December 2002, Geragos defended Academy Award-nominated actress Winona Ryder on charges of stealing more than $5,500 worth of merchandise from a Beverly Hills, California, store in 2001. With the help from Geragos, she was sentenced only to three years' probation and ordered to undergo psychological and drug counseling.
- Michael Jackson – In the early stages of the Michael Jackson molestation case, Geragos simultaneously handled this case and the Scott Peterson case, two of the best-known American trials at that time. Geragos's "crushingly busy calendar" in the courtroom earned him a rebuke by a judge in an embezzlement case Geragos was also representing. On April 26, 2004, Jackson removed Geragos as his attorney, replacing him with Thomas Mesereau. In a public statement provided by his spokesperson, Raymone Bain, Jackson said, "It is imperative that I have the full attention of those who are representing me. My life is at stake..." suggesting that Geragos may not have had enough time to handle his case because of his workload. Geragos later said that he was dismayed to see Jackson climb atop an SUV to the cheers of his fans after leaving the Santa Barbara County, California, courthouse in January 2004, when he was first arraigned on the initial complaint. Geragos's co-counsel, Benjamin Brafman, also expressed disapproval of Jackson's actions. "Although [in January] the lawyers explained the behavior as 'Michael being Michael'," The New York Times reported, "they are said to have privately expressed consternation at the display of frivolity in the face of serious charges."
- Roger Clinton Jr. – Geragos won dismissal of all alcohol-related charges against former President Clinton's brother.
- Carradine family – He assisted the family of actor David Carradine in the aftermath of his accidental death. Geragos had previously represented a class of plaintiffs that had included actor Keith Carradine, his spouse, actress Hayley DuMond, attorney Stephen Kolodny, and designer Donna Dubrow in a class-action lawsuit related to private investigator Anthony Pellicano's illegal wiretapping conspiracy and subsequent conviction.
- Greg Anderson – In 2006, Geragos represented Anderson, who was most notably the personal trainer of Barry Bonds. On July 5, 2006, Anderson was found in contempt of court by U.S. District Judge William Alsup, who jailed Anderson for refusing to testify before a federal grand jury investigating perjury accusations against Bonds. Geragos announced that he would file an appeal based on his assertion that the subpoena to testify violated Anderson's July 2005 plea bargain agreement in the Bay Area Laboratory Co-operative case. Anderson was to be held until he agreed to testify or until the grand jury's term expired. Geragos insisted that his client would not testify. The grand jury expired on July 20, 2006, and Anderson was released from prison two weeks later. On August 28, 2006, Anderson was again found in contempt of court for refusing to testify before a newly convened grand jury and sentenced to prison. Anderson was freed on October 5, 2006, after an order from the Ninth Circuit Court of Appeals found that the trial judge had committed legal errors. Anderson was later sent back to jail on November 16, 2006.
- Cameron Brown – Geragos was the attorney for Brown, who was charged with murdering his four-year-old daughter by throwing her off a Rancho Palos Verdes cliff. The twelve-week trial ended in August 2006 without a verdict. The jury deliberated for over nine days but was hopelessly deadlocked and a mistrial was declared by Torrance Superior Court Judge Mark Arnold. With the Brown family's funds depleted, Geragos ended his representation. Subsequently, Judge Arnold appointed Geragos associate Pat Harris, with whom he had tried the case, to represent Brown in a second trial that also ended in a hung jury. A third trial saw him convicted. After the second trial resulted in a hung jury, the Geragos & Geragos firm turned the case over to attorney Herbert M. Barish.
- Victor Willis – In September 2006, Geragos represented the Village People front man on charges of drug and weapons possession. Facing jail time, Geragos successfully negotiated a sentence of three years probation and treatment for drug addiction at the Betty Ford Clinic.
- Amphit Dhaliwal and Kulbir Dhaliwal – In December 2007, the two survivors of the tiger attack at the San Francisco Zoo, hired Geragos to represent them against potential criminal charges, and also with the anticipation of filing a lawsuit against the zoo. Despite pressure from city officials, the local police inspector made it clear that there were no grounds for filing criminal charges against the Dhaliwal brothers related to the tiger attack. Geragos filed a federal suit against the Zoo and the City of San Francisco for violation of the Dhaliwal brothers' civil rights, including the Dhaliwals' being subject to search and seizure without probable cause, and for intentional infliction of emotional distress. Geragos settled the civil suit in the early phase of the court process for $900,000.
- Kazuyoshi Miura – In 2008, Geragos joined the defense of Japanese businessman Miura, who committed suicide before his trial.
- Chris Brown – Geragos represented Brown, who pleaded guilty to the assault of his then-girlfriend, Rihanna. On February 8, 2009, Geragos brought Chris Brown to surrender to the LAPD. Later, Brown was arrested, and his court date was set to be on March 5, 2009. Geragos and Brown attended the court date, but did not plea and asked for arraignment until the next court date, April 6, 2009. On June 22, 2009, Brown pleaded guilty to one count of felony assault and was sentenced to 5 years' probation and 6 months' community service. However, Brown's inability to adhere to the rules of his probation ultimately led to his dismissal from rehab and the singer was thrown in jail from March 2014 to June of that year. Under counsel from Geragos, Brown was once again released under probation. Early in 2015, Brown's probation was revoked after he was present in two nightclubs where shootings took place. His probation officer had a problem with the singer traveling to San Jose, to perform at the nightclub where an incident occurred leaving five people shot and injured. Brown was aware his probation could end with the hearing, and before entering the courthouse, he tweeted: "Hopefully this is my last day in court … Pray for me." However, at Brown's scheduled March 20 court date, with the help of Geragos, Brown's probation officer reversed course, saying in a positive review that Brown had completed his community service sentence. Los Angeles Superior Court Judge James R. Brandlin concurred, ruling the singer would no longer be under the watchful eye of the judicial system. Geragos said this of his client, “He is in a spot right now and a place right now that I couldn’t be prouder of him,” adding that the end of Brown's probation is “a monumental feat for him.”
- Colin Kaepernick – Former 49ers quarterback Colin Kaepernick first filed a grievance against the NFL in October 2017, claiming that the NFL tried to keep him from playing after he chose to kneel during the national anthem. The quarterback opted out of his contract with the 49ers in March of the same year and was not picked up later in free agency. Kaepernick began kneeling during the 2016 season to protest racial inequality and police brutality. Safety Eric Reid and several other NFL players eventually joined him. Reid, a former teammate of Kaepernick's, was also a member of the grievance Kaepernick filed. After several months of ongoing dialogue with representatives of the NFL, both Kaepernick and Reid withdrew their collusion cases against the National Football League. On February 15, both Geragos and co-counsel Ben Meiselas released a joint statement with the NFL, declaring the resolution of the matter was subject to a confidentiality agreement.
- Jussie Smollett – Geragos represented Smollett in the 2019 alleged false police report. On March 12, 2019, it was reported that Chicago prosecutors had dropped all 16 criminal charges against Empire star Jussie Smollett as part of a deferred prosecution agreement against him. As part of the conditions of the deal, Smollett did 16 hours of community service and forfeited his $10,000 bond to the city. Chicago Mayor Rahm Emanuel announced he wanted Jussie Smollett to cover the cost of the Chicago police department's investigation, which amounted to $130,000. Smollett's attorneys responded in a statement via NBC News that "Jussie has paid enough". Geragos and his firm also filed a motion to seal the case, which was granted by a judge. On April 23, 2019, Geragos was sued, along with Tina Glandian (another member of Smollett's legal team), under claims of defamation and false light by the Osundairo brothers (originally arrested in connection with an alleged attack on the actor). However, a defamatory quote the Osundairos attributed to Glandian and Geragos in their lawsuit was in fact, said by their own attorney, Gloria Schmidt. The Osundairo brothers also paraphrased statements they claimed Geragos said on the Reasonable Doubt podcast (which Geragos co-hosts with comic Adam Carolla), alleging Geragos dragged their reps through the mud by indicating the brothers had attacked Smollett, committed perjury and conspired to make false statements to clear their names. Geragos submitted transcripts of his podcast during the time of the criminal legal proceedings, noting he never said the brothers' names, nor did he say or indicate what they attributed to him. The case was dismissed by the judge.
- Piper Partridge, et al v. City of Benton, Arkansas, et al – In March 2018, Chief U.S. District Judge Brian Miller granted the city of Benton, Arkansas a motion to dismiss a lawsuit that Keagan Schweikle's parents, Piper Partridge and Dominic Schweikle, had filed against the city's officer, Kyle Ellison, and its police chief at the time, Kirk Lane. However, on July 3, 2019, a federal appeals court reinstated a lawsuit filed in 2017 against Benton police by the parents of the suicidal 17-year-old boy (Keagan) who was shot and killed while complying with an officer's order (Kyle Ellison) to move a gun away from his head. Filed by Geragos and Little Rock attorney Rick Holiman, the lawsuit alleged that Ellison used excessive force when he fired three shots at Schweikle as he stood on a bank facing the river and holding a gun in his right hand after threatening to shoot himself. Miller said that after Ellison ordered Schweikle to drop the gun and the boy moved it away from his head, the intention behind his actions was ambiguous, leaving the officer little choice but to shoot. Miller noted, "Keagan could have quickly pointed the gun at Ellison and opened fire almost instantaneously ... Ellison had a right to protect himself". A three-judge panel of the 8th U.S. Circuit Court of Appeals in St. Louis said Miller ruled on the matter too early in the process. In 2019, an 8th U.S. Circuit Court of Appeals reversed a lower court finding that a Benton police officer Kyle Ellison had acted reasonably when he fatally shot a suicidal teen, Keagan Schweikle, in October 2016. In March 2018, Chief U.S. District Judge Brian Miller granted the city's motion to dismiss the lawsuit that Keagan Schweikle's parents, Piper Partridge and Dominic Schweikle, had filed against the city, officer Kyle Ellison and its police chief at the time, Kirk Lane. Filed by Geragos and Little Rock attorney Rick Holiman, the lawsuit alleged that Ellison used excessive force when he fired three shots at Schweikle as he stood on a bank facing the river and holding a gun in his right hand after threatening to shoot himself. A panel of federal judges restored the lawsuit over the officer-involved shooting death of 17-year-old Keagan Schweikle of Benton.
- Scottie Pippen – In February 2014, Scottie Pippen hired Geragos to file a countersuit against a Malibu man who alleged the former NBA All-Star assaulted him at a restaurant last year. Camran Shafighi filed a $4 million lawsuit against Pippen, accusing him of a “brutal and unjustified physical attack" that allegedly occurred outside upscale Nobu restaurant after Shafighi had sought a picture with the former Chicago Bull. In the cross-complaint filed by Geragos earlier in February, alleged Shafighi cursed at Pippen using racial slurs, spat on him and his children and said, "I’m going to kill you". The cross-complaint also alleged that Shafighi was “extremely aggressive and noticeably intoxicated” and calls for unspecified damages "according to proof".
- Travelers Insurance – Mark Geragos and his law firm – along with multiple clients – are suing Travelers Insurance for initially denying coverage of their pandemic-related claims. The firm says that while it's technically an essential business and not subject to a mandated shutdown, access to its downtown L.A. office has been "greatly limited" and the company has "been forced to deal with a substantial loss in business traffic and client/law-related business activities".
- Cain Velasquez – Geragos began representing former UFC Heavyweight Champion Cain Velasquez, in defense against criminal charges in Santa Clara County, California, in March 2022.
- Menendez brothers – Geragos began representing the Menendez brothers in 2023 as their post-conviction attorney. He took on their case to advocate for a new trial or resentencing based on newly surfaced evidence supporting their claims of long-term sexual abuse by their father, José Menendez. This evidence includes a letter Erik Menendez wrote to a cousin before the murders, detailing the alleged abuse, and an affidavit from former Menudo member Roy Rosselló, who accused José Menendez of assaulting him in the 1980s. Geragos has been actively involved in legal proceedings since then, including filing a writ of habeas corpus in May 2023 and a resentencing case in mid-2024. He has also participated in court hearings and public discussions about the case. As of April 2025, Geragos continues to represent the brothers in their ongoing efforts to seek a new trial or resentencing. In May 2025, a judge resentenced the Menendez brothers to fifty years to life, making them eligible for parole because they were under twenty-six years old when they committed the murders.

== Alleged involvement in Nike extortion case ==
Geragos was alleged to have participated in a scheme with attorney Michael Avenatti to extort Nike, but was not charged. At the sentencing hearing, lawyers for Avenatti questioned why Geragos had not been charged. The judge's rationale for reducing Avenatti's sentence was that Geragos was “a central figure in the criminal conduct,” but "suffered no consequences as a result", and "was not even charged.” In November 2019, according to a new indictment filed in Manhattan federal court, conspiracy charges against Michael Avenatti were dropped. The new indictment filed also appears to clear Mark Geragos.

== Media ==
Geragos occasionally appears as both guest and legal commentator on TV. He has appeared on the Today show, Good Morning America, 60 Minutes, Anderson Cooper 360°, On the Record w/ Greta Van Susteren, How It Really Happened and has appeared a number of times on Larry King Live, including its 20th-anniversary show. Geragos was employed by CNN in a contributor role until March 25, 2019, when he was reportedly implicated in an alleged scheme with attorney Michael Avenatti to extort more than $20 million from Nike, Inc.

In addition to his former role as contributor on CNN, Mark Geragos and Sunny Hostin hosted a 2014 legal program entitled Making the Case.

Geragos has made multiple appearances on the Adam Carolla Show since 2013, usually giving commentary on whatever is the top legal issue in pop culture. He guest-hosted for Carolla in April 2014 while Carolla was shooting his independent feature film Road Hard. Geragos filled in for Dr. Drew Pinsky and co-hosted with Carolla in March 2015 on The Adam and Dr. Drew Show, another podcast that airs on Carolla's Carolla Digital Network.

In June 2015, it was announced that Geragos would co-host a podcast with Carolla that would be a part of Carolla Digital. The show is called Reasonable Doubt and features Carolla and Geragos discussing issues in society including the law, from Geragos's viewpoint as a civil and criminal defense attorney. The show debuted on July 25, 2015, and new episodes debut every Saturday.

Geragos was an executive producer for the 2016 ABC network television series Notorious, which was inspired by the working relationship between Geragos and Larry King Live producer Wendy Walker. The show was cancelled after one season.

Mistrial: An Inside Look at How the Criminal Justice System Works, co-authored by Geragos and Pat Harris, was published by Penguin in 2013.

== Awards ==
- 1999 – Trial Lawyer of the Year by the Los Angeles Criminal Courts Bar Association
- 1999 – Jerry Giesler Memorial Award for Trial Skills, Judgement & Dedication
- 2001 – Humanitarian of the Year by the Mexican American Grocers Association
- 2004 – Professional of the Year by the Armenian Professional Society
- 2005 – Consumer Attorney of the Year by the Consumer Attorneys of California
- 2006 – Attorney of the Year by the California Lawyer magazine

== See also ==
- History of Armenian Americans in Los Angeles
