= Kevin Toth =

American shot putter

Kevin Toth (born December 29, 1967, in Cleveland, Ohio) is an American former shot put athlete.

Toth competed for the McNeese Cowboys track and field team in the NCAA.

His personal best throw was 22.67 meters (74.4 feet) in 2003, which places him tenth on the all-time performers list (as of February 2025).

In 2004, the United States Anti-Doping Agency announced that Toth received a two-year ban following a positive test for use of tetrahydrogestrinone (THG). Toth subsequently retired from competing.

== See also ==
- BALCO investigation
