= Desoxymethyltestosterone =

Chemical compound

Clinical data
- Other names: DMT; Madol; Pheraplex; 3-Desoxy-17α-methyl-δ^{2}-5α-dihydrotestosterone; 3-Desoxy-17α-methyl-δ^{2}-DHT; 17α-Methyl-5α-androst-2-en-17β-ol; NSC-63329; SC-11977
- Pregnancy category: X
- Routes of administration: By mouth
- Drug class: Androgen; Anabolic steroid
- ATC code: None

Legal status
- Legal status: UK: Class C; US: Schedule III

Identifiers
- IUPAC name: (5S,8R,9S,10S,13S,14S,17S)-10,13,17-trimethyl-1,4,5,6,7,8,9,11,12,14,15,16-dodecahydrocyclopenta[a]phenanthren-17-ol
- CAS Number: 3275-64-7
- PubChem CID: 18651
- ChemSpider: 17611
- UNII: B9E9G5A169
- CompTox Dashboard (EPA): DTXSID50872931

Chemical and physical data
- Formula: C_{20}H_{32}O
- Molar mass: 288.475 g·mol^{−1}
- 3D model (JSmol): Interactive image
- SMILES: O[C@@]4([C@@]2([C@H]([C@@H]1CC[C@@H]3[C@]([C@H]1CC2)(C)C\C=C/C3)CC4)C)C
- InChI: InChI=1S/C20H32O/c1-18-11-5-4-6-14(18)7-8-15-16(18)9-12-19(2)17(15)10-13-20(19,3)21/h4-5,14-17,21H,6-13H2,1-3H3/t14-,15-,16+,17+,18+,19+,20+/m1/s1; Key:FRVHJVATKMIOPQ-PAPWGAKMSA-N

Desoxymethyltestosterone (DMT), known by the nicknames Madol and Pheraplex, is a synthetic and orally active anabolic–androgenic steroid (AAS) and a 17α-methylated derivative of dihydrotestosterone (DHT) which was never marketed for medical use. It was one of the first designer steroids to be marketed as a performance-enhancing drug to athletes and bodybuilders.

Desoxymethyltestosterone is sometimes abbreviated as DMT, though it should not be confused with the hallucinogen dimethyltryptamine, which is also known by the same acronym.

== Pharmacology ==
=== Pharmacodynamics ===
In animal studies, desoxymethyltestosterone has been found to bind to the androgen receptor (AR) about half as strongly as DHT, and to cause side effects that are typical of 17α-alkylated AAS, such as liver damage and left ventricular hypertrophy when taken in higher doses.

Desoxymethyltestosterone is unusual in that it is structurally a 2-ene compound, lacking the 3-keto group present in almost all commercial AAS (with ethylestrenol being a rare and notable exception). This does not mean it is a weak compound, and clinical research has determined that it is a fairly potent oral agent. Rat studies indicate that desoxymethyltestosterone has an anabolic effect 160% that of testosterone while being only 60% as androgenic, giving it a Q ratio of 6.5:1. Because of this favorable ratio, experiments in orchiectomized rats have demonstrated that treatment with desoxymethyltestosterone resulted only in a stimulation of the weight of the levator ani muscle; the prostate and seminal vesicle weights remained unaffected leading the authors of one study to characterize desoxymethyltestosterone as a powerful AAS with attributes of a selective androgen receptor modulator (SARM) and some indication of toxicity.

== Chemistry ==
Desoxymethyltestosterone, also known as 3-desoxy-17α-methyl-δ^{2}-5α-dihydrotestosterone (3-desoxy-17α-methyl-δ^{2}-DHT) or as 17α-methyl-5α-androst-2-en-17β-ol, is a synthetic androstane steroid and a 17α-alkylated derivative of dihydrotestosterone (DHT).

== History ==
Desoxymethyltestosterone was invented in 1961 by Max Huffman who obtained a patent on the compound the same year. It was described in the scientific literature in 1963. However, it was never brought to market as a commercial drug. Desoxymethyltestosterone was rediscovered by chemist, AAS enthusiast, and amateur bodybuilder Patrick Arnold in 2005. Arnold produced desoxymethyltestosterone and supplied it to Victor Conte of Bay Area Laboratory Co-operative (BALCO), an American nutritional supplement company and steroid supplier.

DMT became a controlled substance in the US on January 4, 2010, and is classified as a Schedule III anabolic steroid under the United States Controlled Substances Act along with boldione and dienedione. The substance had come under scrutiny after it was found to be present in several over-the-counter bodybuilding supplements.

== Synthesis ==
The chemical synthesis is described: (compound 27) Recent Sino improvements:

Epiandrosterone [481-29-8] (1) is reacted with diethylaminosulfur trifluoride to give 5alpha-Androst-2-ene-17-one (2). However this method of dehydration only resulted in 30% yield. Therefore improvements were sought.

== See also ==
- 5α-Androst-2-en-17-one
