= The cream =

Ointment used to mask doping in professional athletes

"The cream" is a testosterone-based ointment that is used in conjunction with anabolic steroids such as tetrahydrogestrinone (THG, also known as "the clear") in order to mask doping in professional athletes.

The drug was made public when the United States Anti-Doping Agency was contacted by an anonymous athletics coach, later identified as Trevor Graham, who claimed that several top athletes were using THG as an illegal performance-enhancing drug. After an investigation, it was revealed that many top baseball athletes were connected with THG; the list included stars such as Jason Giambi, who would also confess to using human growth hormone and testosterone, and Gary Sheffield, who admitted using "the cream" and "the clear", albeit unknowingly.

When questioned about the substance, athletes said that the two substances were identified only as "the cream" and "the clear". It was later determined that the Bay Area Laboratory Co-operative, which supplied THG, had provided it in conjunction with "the cream" in order to increase the overall steroid content of the body. It had been distributed to several athletes by trainer Greg Anderson.

== Composition ==
An affidavit from the United States Anti-Doping Agency (USADA) reveals that "the cream" was a composition of testosterone and epitestosterone designed to increase the natural level of the steroid testosterone while not disrupting the ratio of testosterone to epitestosterone, a common metric used in traditional drug tests.
