= Bill Romanowski =

American football player (born 1966)

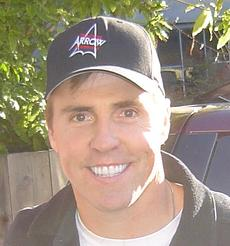
- Romanowski in 2006

No. 53
- Position: Linebacker

Personal information
- Born: April 2, 1966 (age 60); Vernon, Connecticut, U.S.
- Listed height: 6 ft 4 in (1.93 m)
- Listed weight: 245 lb (111 kg)

Career information
- High school: Rockville (CT)
- College: Boston College (1984–1987)
- NFL draft: 1988: 3rd round, 80th overall pick

Career history
- San Francisco 49ers (1988–1993); Philadelphia Eagles (1994–1995); Denver Broncos (1996–2001); Oakland Raiders (2002–2003)

Awards and highlights
- 4× Super Bowl champion (XXIII, XXIV, XXXII, XXXIII); 2× Pro Bowl (1996, 1998); PFWA All-Rookie Team (1988); Second-team All-American (1987); 3× First-team All-East (1985, 1986, 1987)

Career NFL statistics
- Total tackles: 1,118
- Sacks: 39.5
- Forced fumbles: 16
- Fumble recoveries: 18
- Interceptions: 18
- Defensive touchdowns: 1
- Stats at Pro Football Reference

William Thomas Romanowski (born April 2, 1966) is an American former football linebacker who played in the National Football League (NFL) for 16 seasons. Nicknamed "Romo" and "RomoCop", he spent the majority of his career with the San Francisco 49ers and Denver Broncos.

Romanowski played college football for the Boston College Eagles, receiving second-team All-American honors in 1987. He was selected by the 49ers in the third round of the 1988 NFL draft. Romanowski played six seasons each in San Francisco and Denver and was also a member of the Philadelphia Eagles and Oakland Raiders for two seasons each. At the time of his retirement, Romanowski won four Super Bowl titles, two each with the 49ers and Broncos, and twice received Pro Bowl honors during his Broncos tenure. He also led a controversial career due to often engaging in unsportsmanlike behavior, which resulted in altercations with opponents and teammates.

== Early life and education ==
Romanowski was born in Vernon, Connecticut. He graduated from Rockville High School in 1984 and Boston College in 1988 with academic honors, and was a Scanlan Award recipient.

== NFL career ==
Pre-draft measurables
Height	Weight	Hand span	40-yard dash	10-yard split	20-yard split	20-yard shuttle	Vertical jump
6 ft 3 1/2 in (1.92 m)	231 lb (105 kg)	9 1/4 in (0.23 m)	4.76 s	1.67 s	2.76 s	4.25 s	31.5 in (0.80 m)
All values from NFL Combine

Romanowski went on to a 16-year career in the NFL, playing for the San Francisco 49ers (1988–1993), Philadelphia Eagles (1994–1995), Denver Broncos (1996–2001), and Oakland Raiders (2002–2003). After his career, he was listed by ESPN as the fifth dirtiest player in professional team sports history.

Romanowski played 243 consecutive games during the 1988–2003 seasons, an NFL record that stood until Chris Gardocki broke it during the 2006 season, finishing his career with 265, (256 regular season and nine playoff games). He won four Super Bowl Championships, and played in five Super Bowls (Super Bowl XXIII, Super Bowl XXIV, Super Bowl XXXII, Super Bowl XXXIII and Super Bowl XXXVII). His only loss was in the last of these.

During his 16-year career, Romanowski compiled 1,105 tackles, 39.5 sacks, 18 forced fumbles, and 18 interceptions, which he returned for a net total of 98 yards and one career touchdown. Romanowski was a Pro Bowl selection twice, in 1996 and 1998, both during his tenure with the Denver Broncos.

=== Altercations ===
Romanowski was involved in numerous altercations with both teammates and opponents. In 1995, while with the Eagles, he was ejected from a game — and subsequently fined $4,500 — for kicking Arizona Cardinals fullback Larry Centers in the head.

Two more incidents occurred during the 1997 season while he played for the Broncos. In the first, he was fined $20,000 after a helmet-to-helmet hit on Carolina Panthers quarterback Kerry Collins in a preseason game resulting in Collins sustaining a broken jaw.

In the second incident, Romanowski spat in the face of 49ers wide receiver J. J. Stokes in a regular-season game played in December on a Monday night in response to Stokes' taunting.

Two years later, while still with the Broncos, he was fined a total of $42,500 for three illegal hits plus a punch thrown at Kansas City Chiefs tight end Tony Gonzalez, and was also fined an undisclosed amount for throwing a football at Bryan Cox of the New York Jets, the ball hitting him in the crotch area.

==== Marcus Williams incident ====
In 2003, Romanowski attacked and injured one of his teammates, tight end Marcus Williams, during a scrimmage. Williams was forced to retire after Romanowski crushed his eye socket with the punch.

Williams sued for damages of $3.4 million, arguing that Romanowski had been suffering from "roid rage" when he attacked him. Williams was awarded $340,000 for lost wages and medical expenses by a jury. Williams was quoted as saying he and his lawyers "just wanted to prove what was right and wrong about football". Williams' attorney said he was very pleased with the verdict.

== NFL career statistics ==
Legend
	Won the Super Bowl
**Bold**	Career high

=== Regular season ===
Year	Team	Games		Tackles					Interceptions						Fumbles			
Year	Team	GP	GS	Cmb	Solo	Ast	Sck	Tfl	PD	Int	Yds	Avg	Lng	TD	FF	FR	Yds	TD
1988	SF	**16**	8	53	–	–	0.0	–	–	0	0	0.0	0	0	3	1	0	0
1989	SF	**16**	4	53	–	–	1.0	–	–	1	13	**13.0**	13	0	1	2	0	0
1990	SF	**16**	**16**	79	–	–	1.0	–	–	0	0	0.0	0	0	0	0	0	0
1991	SF	**16**	**16**	76	–	–	1.0	–	–	1	7	7.0	7	0	0	2	0	0
1992	SF	**16**	**16**	80	–	–	1.0	–	–	0	0	0.0	0	0	1	1	0	0
1993	SF	**16**	**16**	**104**	–	–	3.0	–	–	0	0	0.0	0	0	2	1	0	0
1994	PHI	**16**	15	66	49	17	2.5	–	–	2	8	4.0	8	0	0	1	0	0
1995	PHI	**16**	**16**	63	50	13	1.0	–	–	2	5	2.5	7	0	0	1	0	0
1996	DEN	**16**	**16**	77	56	21	3.0	–	–	**3**	1	0.3	1	0	0	**3**	0	0
1997	DEN	**16**	**16**	70	56	14	2.0	–	–	1	7	7.0	7	0	1	0	0	0
1998	DEN	**16**	**16**	72	55	17	**7.5**	–	–	2	22	11.0	**18**	0	2	**3**	0	0
1999	DEN	**16**	**16**	73	57	16	0.0	4	**7**	**3**	**35**	11.7	**18**	**1**	0	1	0	0
2000	DEN	**16**	**16**	72	62	10	3.5	6	6	2	0	0.0	3	0	**4**	2	0	0
2001	DEN	**16**	**16**	69	55	14	7.0	**9**	2	0	0	0.0	0	0	2	0	0	0
2002	OAK	**16**	**16**	91	**65**	**26**	4.0	7	5	1	0	0.0	0	0	0	0	0	0
2003	OAK	3	3	20	16	4	2.0	4	0	0	0	0.0	0	0	0	0	0	0
Career		243	222	1,118	521	152	39.5	30	20	18	98	5.4	18	1	16	18	0	0

=== Postseason ===
Year	Team	Games		Tackles					Interceptions						Fumbles			
Year	Team	GP	GS	Cmb	Solo	Ast	Sck	Tfl	PD	Int	Yds	Avg	Lng	TD	FF	FR	Yds	TD
1988	SF	3	0	2	–	–	0.0	–	–	**1**	0	0.0	0	0	0	0	0	0
1989	SF	3	0	1	–	–	0.0	–	–	0	0	0.0	0	0	0	0	0	0
1990	SF	2	2	0	–	–	0.0	–	–	0	0	0.0	0	0	0	0	0	0
1992	SF	2	2	0	–	–	**1.0**	–	–	0	0	0.0	0	0	0	0	0	0
1993	SF	2	2	0	–	–	0.0	–	–	0	0	0.0	0	0	0	0	0	0
1995	PHI	2	1	12	11	1	0.0	–	–	0	0	0.0	0	0	0	0	0	0
1996	DEN	1	1	2	2	0	0.0	–	–	0	0	0.0	0	0	0	0	0	0
1997	DEN	**4**	**4**	13	11	2	0.0	–	–	0	0	0.0	0	0	0	0	0	0
1998	DEN	3	3	9	8	1	**1.0**	–	–	**1**	0	0.0	0	0	0	**1**	-2	0
2000	DEN	1	1	4	2	2	0.0	**1**	0	0	0	0.0	0	0	0	0	0	0
2002	OAK	3	3	**20**	**15**	**5**	0.0	0	0	0	0	0.0	0	0	0	**1**	0	0
Career		26	19	63	52	11	2.0	1	0	2	0	0.0	0	0	0	2	-2	0

== Post-NFL career ==
Romanowski co-authored an autobiography in 2005 titled Romo My Life on the Edge: Living Dreams and Slaying Dragons. The book became a New York Times best-selling book in 2005. It chronicles his childhood, college career, NFL career, living with post-concussion symptoms, nutrition, and recovery techniques used during his NFL playing career.

He was featured on the cover of the Midway Games title Blitz: The League and adds his voice as Bruno Battaglia, a linebacker in the game who wears his 53. He also appears in the NCAA Football series indirectly as LB #53 for the 1984 Boston College Eagles.

In 2006, he founded Nutrition53, a nutritional supplement company. He was also a minority owner of NASCAR's Swan Racing in 2013; Nutrition53 sponsored the team in 10 races that year.

In 2024 Romanowski and his wife declared bankruptcy after being sued by the I.R.S. for more than $15 million in unpaid back taxes.

=== Football ===
In 2008, Romanowski was the defensive coordinator for the Piedmont High School (California) Highlanders Freshman Football team, where his son played.

In January 2009, Romanowski threw his name into the search for Mike Shanahan's replacement as the head coach of the Denver Broncos. Romanowski sent a 30-page PowerPoint presentation to team owner Pat Bowlen, but was not considered for the job. The job was ultimately given to Josh McDaniels.

=== BALCO scandal ===
Romanowski and his wife were investigated for prescription drug fraud, though the charges were later dropped. Records seized by the government belonging to the Bay Area Laboratory Co-operative, later discovered to be the source of a designer steroid, indicate that he had used the anabolic steroid "The Clear" and synthetic testosterone ointment "The Cream" provided by BALCO since 2003. Romanowski admitted to staying a step ahead of NFL drug testing policies. In an October 16, 2005 appearance on 60 Minutes, Romanowski admitted to using steroids and human growth hormone that he received from Victor Conte, BALCO owner.

=== In media ===
Year	Title	Role	Notes
2005	The Longest Yard	Guard Lambert	
2005	Shooting Gallery	Case	
2006	The Benchwarmers	Karl	
2008	Wieners	Cowboy	
2008	Get Smart	Federal Air Marshal	
2008	Bedtime Stories	Biker	
2010	Blue Mountain State	Himself	
2011	Jack and Jill	Himself	
2014	Blended	Baseball Fan	
