= Don Catlin =

American anti-doping scientist (1938–2024)

- Born: Donald Hardt Catlin; June 4, 1938; New Haven, Connecticut, U.S.
- Died: January 16, 2024 (aged 85); Los Angeles, California, U.S.
- Education: Yale University; University of Rochester School of Medicine and Dentistry (MD)
- Spouse: Bernadette DeGroote (died 1989)
- Children: 2
- Scientific career
- Fields: Pharmacology
- Workplaces: UCLA David Geffen School of Medicine

Donald Hardt Catlin (June 4, 1938 – January 16, 2024) was an American anti-doping scientist. He is one of the founders of modern drug-testing in professional sports.

== Early life and education ==
Catlin was born in New Haven, Connecticut on June 4, 1938. He earned a bachelor's degree in statistics and psychology at Yale University in 1960 and a MD degree from the University of Rochester School of Medicine and Dentistry in 1965. He interned and served in residencies at the University of Vermont and UCLA before serving in the United States Army from 1969 to 1972 during which time he worked at Walter Reed Army Medical Center.

== Career ==
Catlin oversaw the testing for performance-enhancing drugs at the three most recent Olympics that were held in the United States, starting with the 1984 Summer Games in Los Angeles. He oversaw the testing for the United States Olympic Committee, the National Collegiate Athletic Association (NCAA), Major League Baseball's minor league teams, and the National Football League (NFL). He also developed drug identification techniques that are currently in use on the Olympic, professional, and collegiate levels.

In 1982, Catlin founded the UCLA Olympic Analytical Laboratory, the first anti-doping lab in the United States. It is now the world's largest testing facility of performance-enhancing drugs. He remained the lab's director for 25 years.

In the 1990s, Catlin began to offer the carbon isotope ratio test, a urine test that determines whether anabolic steroids are made naturally by the body or come from a prohibited performance-enhancing drug.

In 2002 at the Winter Olympics in Salt Lake City, Catlin reported darbepoetin alfa, a form of the blood booster EPO (erythropoietin), for the first time in sports. Also in 2002, he identified norbolethone, the first reported designer anabolic steroid used by an athlete.

In 2003, as part of the investigation of BALCO, he identified and developed a test for tetrahydrogestrinone or "The Clear," the second reported designer anabolic steroid. In November 2009, Newsweek named Trevor Graham's decision to send a syringe containing the substance to the United States Anti-Doping Agency, which then passed it on to Catlin for analysis, as one of the decade's Top-10 History-Altering Decisions.

In 2004, Catlin identified madol, the third reported designer anabolic steroid, also known as DMT, and from 2004 he and his team identified several more designer steroids.

The same year, he co-founded Banned Substances Control Group (BSCG) with his son, Oliver Catlin, and attorney, Ryan Connolly. They founded BSCG with the mission of remedying supplement quality control and safety concerns.

Catlin served as president and CEO of the Los Angeles-based NGO Anti-Doping Research, Inc. (ADR). It was founded in 2005 to bolster efforts to uncover new drugs that are being used illegally by competitors, and to develop accurate tests in order to easily detect them in athletes. Anti-Doping Research Inc advocates for and establishes programs to encourage all levels of athletes to refrain from the use of performance-enhancing drugs.

In 2006, Catlin received a request from The Washington Post to analyze a dietary supplement created by Patrick Arnold, which he identified the active ingredient as methylhexaneamine. The substance was added to the WADA banned list in 2009.

In 2009, Catlin and his team at Anti-Doping Research developed an equine test for the potent blood-boosting drug Mircera, also known as Continuous erythropoietin receptor activator.

In a peer-reviewed article published in the August 2009 issue of the science journal Comparative Exercise Physiology, Catlin, along with colleagues at ADR, reported to have developed an equine test for the powerful blood-boosting drug CERA. ADR is currently developing an effective urine test that will detect human growth hormone (hGH) – one of the most sought-after tests by sports leagues worldwide.

Catlin was professor of Molecular and Medical Pharmacology at the UCLA David Geffen School of Medicine. He served as chairman of the Equine Drug Research Institute's Scientific Advisory Committee and as a member of the Federation Equestre Internationale Commission on Equine Anti-Doping & Medication. Since 1988, he was a member of the International Olympic Committee Medical Commission. Catlin served the International Olympic Committee Medical Commission for over 20 years.

The Chicago Tribune named Catlin Sportsman of the Year for 2002.

== Personal life ==
Catlin's wife, Bernadette, a French-Belgian nurse he met at UCLA, died of melanoma in 1989. He has two sons: Bryce Catlin, a software engineer who is married and living in the Bay Area in California, and Oliver Catlin, president of Banned Substances Control Group (BSCG) in Los Angeles. He was featured in the documentary film Icarus, where he introduced the American producer Bryan Fogel to the Russian scientist Grigory Rodchenkov; the subsequent events helped expose the Russian doping scandal.

Catlin died after a stroke in Los Angeles on January 16, 2024, at the age of 85.

== See also ==
- World Anti-Doping Agency
- Erythropoietin
- Norbolethone
- Tetrahydrogestrinone
- Bay Area Laboratory Co-operative
- Use of performance-enhancing drugs in sport
- Mitchell Report (baseball)
- Continuous erythropoietin receptor activator
