= Norboletone =

Chemical compound

Clinical data
- Other names: Norbolethone; 17α-Ethyl-18-methyl-19-nortestosterone; 17α-Ethyl-18-methylestr-4-en-17β-ol-3-one; 13β-Ethyl-17α-hydroxy-18,19-dinorpregn-4-en-3-one
- Routes of administration: By mouth
- Drug class: Androgen; Anabolic steroid
- ATC code: None

Legal status
- Legal status: CA: Schedule IV

Identifiers
- IUPAC name: (8R,9S,10R,13S,14S,17S)-13,17-diethyl-17-hydroxy-1,2,6,7,8,9,10,11,12,14,15,16-dodecahydrocyclopenta[a]phenanthren-3-one
- CAS Number: 1235-15-0
- PubChem CID: 66255
- ChemSpider: 59638
- UNII: U3BZU2241A
- CompTox Dashboard (EPA): DTXSID801015371 DTXSID50154027, DTXSID801015371

Chemical and physical data
- Formula: C_{21}H_{32}O_{2}
- Molar mass: 316.485 g·mol^{−1}
- 3D model (JSmol): Interactive image
- SMILES: O=C4\C=C3/[C@@H]([C@H]2CC[C@]1([C@@H](CC[C@@]1(O)CC)[C@@H]2CC3)CC)CC4
- InChI: InChI=1S/C21H32O2/c1-3-20-11-9-17-16-8-6-15(22)13-14(16)5-7-18(17)19(20)10-12-21(20,23)4-2/h13,16-19,23H,3-12H2,1-2H3/t16-,17+,18+,19-,20-,21-/m0/s1; Key:FTBJKONNNSKOLX-XUDSTZEESA-N

Norboletone (INN) (former proposed brand name Genabol), or norbolethone, is a synthetic and orally active anabolic–androgenic steroid (AAS) which was never marketed. It was first developed in 1966 by Wyeth Laboratories and was investigated for use as an agent to encourage weight gain and for the treatment of short stature, but was never marketed commercially because of fears that it might be toxic. It subsequently showed up in urine tests on athletes in competition in the early 2000s.

Norboletone was found to have been brought to the market by the chemist Patrick Arnold, of the Bay Area Laboratory Co-operative (BALCO), an American nutritional supplement company. It is reputed to have been the active ingredient in the original formulation of the "undetectable" steroid formulation known as "The Clear" before being replaced by the more potent drug tetrahydrogestrinone.

In 2002, Don Catlin, the founder and then-director of the UCLA Olympic Analytical Lab, identified norboletone for the first time in an athlete's urine sample. In the same year, U.S. bicycle racer Tammy Thomas was caught using it and was banned from her sport. The following year, Catlin identified and developed a test for tetrahydrogestrinone (THG), the second reported designer anabolic sample—a key development in the BALCO Affair.

Norboletone is on the World Anti-Doping Agency's list of prohibited substances, and is therefore banned from use in most major sports.

== Chemistry ==
=== Synthesis ===
Hughes & Smith reported the original synthesis of norboletone. Commercial: NB: Although the synthesis has involved the formation of no fewer than 6 chiral centers, only two of the possible 64 possible isomers are formed.

The halogenation of 3-(3-methoxyphenyl)propan-1-ol [7252-82-6] (1) with phosphorus tribromide gives 1-(3-bromopropyl)-3-methoxybenzene [6943-97-1] (2). Treatment with monosodium acetylide gives 5-m-methoxyphenylpent-1-yne [1424-70-0] (3) . (Ex 1) The Mannich reaction gives 1-Diethylamino-6-m-methoxyphenylhex-2-yne, PC21485597 (4). (Ex 8) The oxymercuration reaction with mercury(II) sulfate in aqueous sulfuric acid gives a mixture of 1-(Diethylamino)-6-(3-methoxyphenyl)hexan-3-one [3706-69-2] (5) and 6-m-Methoxyphenylhex-1-en-3-one, PC10798238 (6). (Ex 17) Treatment with 2-Ethyl-1,3-cyclopentanedione [823-36-9] (7) in the presence of pyridine base causes a Michael reaction to occur to give 2-Ethyl-2-[6-(m-methoxyphenyl)-3-oxohexyl]-1,3-cyclopentanedione, PC21485569 (8). (Ex 43) The cyclodehydration step was achieved by refluxing with a catalytic amount of TsOH in a DS-trap to give [848-07-7] (9). (Ex 68) Catalytic hydrogenation over Raney nickel gives (10). (Ex 83) Ethynylation with ethynyl lithium gave (11). (Ex 96) Catalytic hydrogenation gave (12). (Ex 104) Reduction of the remaining olefin gave PC68145890 (13). Birch reduction gave PC68144974 (14). (Ex 172 & 188) Hydrolysis of the enol ether in mineral acid completed the synthesis of norboletone (15).

== See also ==
- Norgestrel is the unreduced alkyne (ethynyl group).
