= 5α-Androst-2-ene-17-one =

Chemical compound

Clinical data
- Other names: 5α-Androst-2-en-17-one; 17-Oxo-5α-androst-2-ene; Delta-2-androst-17-one; (+)-Androst-2-en-17-one; Occlesterone
- Routes of administration: Oral

Identifiers
- IUPAC name: (5S,8R,9S,10S,13S,14S)-10,13-Dimethyl-1,4,5,6,7,8,9,11,12,14,15,16-dodecahydrocyclopenta[a]phenanthren-17-one
- CAS Number: 963-75-7
- PubChem CID: 239425
- ChemSpider: 92089
- UNII: AHC8P4E4ZL
- CompTox Dashboard (EPA): DTXSID30914585
- ECHA InfoCard: 100.012.289

Chemical and physical data
- Formula: C_{19}H_{28}O
- Molar mass: 272.432 g·mol^{−1}
- 3D model (JSmol): Interactive image
- SMILES: C[C@@]34CC[C@H]2[C@@H](CCC1C\C=C/C[C@@]12C)[C@@H]4CCC3=O
- InChI: InChI=1S/C19H28O/c1-18-11-4-3-5-13(18)6-7-14-15-8-9-17(20)19(15,2)12-10-16(14)18/h3-4,13-16H,5-12H2,1-2H3/t13-,14+,15+,16+,18+,19+/m1/s1; Key:ISJVDMWNISUFRJ-HKQXQEGQSA-N

5α-Androst-2-en-17-one, known by the nickname Delta-2, is an endogenous, naturally occurring, orally active anabolic-androgenic steroid (AAS) and a derivative of dihydrotestosterone (DHT). It is a metabolite of dehydroepiandrosterone (DHEA) in the body and is also a pheromone found in elephants and boars. 5α-Androst-2-en-17-one has been sold on the Internet as a "dietary supplement". It resembles desoxymethyltestosterone (17α-methyl-5α-androst-2-en-17β-ol) in chemical structure and may act as an androgen prohormone.
