= Trevor Graham =

Jamaican-born athletics coach and former sprinter

Medal record

Men's Athletics

Representing Jamaica

Olympic Games
Silver medal – second place	1988 Seoul	4x400 m relay

Trevor Graham (born 20 August 1963) is a Jamaican-born American former sprinter and athletics coach. Following the BALCO scandal, the US Olympic Committee barred him indefinitely from all its training sites.

== Athletics career ==
Graham was part of the silver medal-winning Jamaican 4 × 400 m team at the 1988 Summer Olympics, running in the first round and semi-final, though not the final. He is a graduate from Saint Augustine's College with a degree in Business Management.

== Doping scandal ==
=== BALCO ===
Graham first played a critical whistleblower role in the BALCO scandal (Bay Area Laboratory Co-operative) of June 2003, anonymously sending a syringe containing the designer steroid tetrahydrogestrinone to the United States Anti-Doping Agency. The syringe started the investigation. Many others accused him of trying to wipe out a rival. Eventually the investigation came back to Graham, and he was charged with making false statements about his ties to a steroids distributor. He was convicted on one of three felony charges in May 2008. Graham was convicted of one count of lying to federal investigators. A mistrial was declared on two other counts as jurors could not reach a unanimous agreement. Graham was sentenced to one year of house arrest.

=== Doping ban ===
In July 2006, Angel Guillermo Heredia testified before a US Federal Grand Jury that he had worked for Graham from 1996 to 2000, providing illegal performance-enhancing drugs. While a number of athletes coached by Graham have received suspensions for drug use, he has always denied direct knowledge or involvement, and denies having ever met Heredia. After Justin Gatlin failed a test for testosterone, announced in July 2006, Graham stated in an interview that Gatlin had been set up. Two of the athletes Graham had coached admitted to having been knowingly taking drugs. An unsent letter written by BALCO's Victor Conte to the U.S. Anti-Doping Agency described the use of an oral testosterone by Graham that "will clear the body and be undetectable in urine in less than a week after discontinuing use." At the end of the letter, Gatlin was one of four athletes identified as using the drug.

The International Association of Athletics Federations (IAAF) said on 31 July 2006 that Graham could face a two-year ban if evidence links him to any doping violations and the United States Anti-Doping Agency decides not to take action. On 3 August 2006 the United States Olympic Committee banned Graham from its training facilities. This was the first time a coach has received such a ban based on the excessive number of athletes in their charge who have tested positive. Later that month, Nike ended its contract with Graham.

The US Anti-Doping Agency chief executive Travis Tygart, on 15 July 2008, confirmed a life ban on Graham for breaking anti-drugs rules: "It sends a powerful reminder that coaches are not above the rules. There's a misconception that they are because we don't drug-test them, but this shows that we'll use all of our authority. There's no opportunity to seek reinstatement. Any chance that he may have had for that has passed. He's waived that." His ban included participation in any event sanctioned by the U.S. Olympic Committee, the IAAF, USA Track & Field or any other group that participates in the World Anti-Doping Agency program.

Interviewed in 2009 after five years of silence, Graham said he is innocent and that he was considering appealing the lifetime ban.

In 2011, Graham filed an unsuccessful $30 million slander lawsuit against USADA. He is reportedly still trying to get back into coaching as of 2016.
