= United States Anti-Doping Agency =

National anti-doping organization (NADO) for the United States

- Abbreviation: USADA
- Formation: October 1, 2000
- Founder: United States Olympic Committee
- Type: 501(c)(3)
- Tax ID no.: 84-1541903
- Purpose: Preserve the integrity of competition; Inspire true sport; Protect the rights of athletes
- Headquarters: 5555 Tech Center Drive, Colorado Springs, Colorado, U.S.
- Region served: United States of America
- Fields: Doping in sport
- Chief executive officer: Travis Tygart
- Chair: Philip Dunn
- Emeritus Chair: Edwin Moses
- Revenue: US$19.7 million (2016)
- Website: www.usada.org

The United States Anti-Doping Agency (USADA, yoo-SAH-duh) is a non-profit, non-governmental 501(c)(3) organization and the national anti-doping organization (NADO) for the United States. To protect clean competition and the integrity of sport and prevent doping in the United States with a performance-enhancing substance, the USADA provides education, leads scientific initiatives, conducts testing, and oversees the results management process. Headquartered in Colorado Springs, Colorado, USADA is a signatory to the World Anti-Doping Code, which harmonizes anti-doping practices around the world, and is widely considered the basis for the strongest and strictest anti-doping programs to prevent doping in sport.

In 2001, USADA was recognized by the U.S. Congress as "the official anti-doping agency for Olympic, Pan American and Paralympic sport in the United States." While USADA is not a government entity, it is partly funded by the Office of National Drug Control Policy (ONDCP), with its remaining budget generated from contracts for anti-doping services with sport organizations, most notably the United States Olympic and Paralympic Committee (USOPC). The United States has also ratified the UNESCO International Convention against Doping in Sport, the first global international treaty against doping in sport, and largely relies on USADA to carry out this commitment.

Travis Tygart has been the chief executive officer of USADA since September 2007.

== History ==
In October 1999, the USOC launched USADA and operations began on October 1, 2000. In 2003, one of USADA's first major undertakings was the revision of the then-current United States anti-doping policies in order to bring them into compliance with the newly adopted World Anti-Doping Code. One of the major adjustments made to the Code by USADA included reducing the standard of proof required in doping-related adjudication. Before modifications, the standard of proof was equal to that required in a United States court of law. After modification, USADA reduced the standard required to establish a doping violation to "comfortable satisfaction of a hearing body".

Notably, USADA were contracted by the UFC to act as an anti-doping authority within the organization, with the partnership beginning in 2015. However, during a publicized dispute over the eligibility of Conor McGregor to rejoin the UFC's roster following a period of absence from USADA's athlete testing pool, USADA announced that they would not renew their contract with the UFC. The deal between USADA and the UFC is set to expire in 2024, after which the UFC's roster will no longer be subject to USADA testing.

Currently, USADA's status and independence from the USOPC contrasts the norm in sport in the United States, as most professional sport organizations (MLB, NFL, NBA, NHL) manage the anti-doping functions of their own sports. As a result of USADA's ongoing multi-year contracts with the USOPC and the sport national governing bodies (USA Track & Field, USA Cycling, USA Swimming, US Soccer, etc.), the agency is responsible for managing anti-doping programs, including testing and results management, for each sport's athletes and events throughout the year. Despite its name and status as the country's official anti-doping organization, USADA is a private organization and not subject to government oversight.

== World Anti-Doping Code ==
USADA is responsible for implementation of the World Anti-Doping Agency's Code (Code) in the United States. The Code is the core document that harmonizes anti-doping policies, rules, and regulations within sport organizations and among public authorities around the world. It works in conjunction with five International Standards, which aim to foster consistency among anti-doping organizations in: testing; laboratories; therapeutic use exemptions; the list of prohibited substances and methods; and the protection of privacy and personal information. The Code's International Standards are as follows:

- WADA Prohibited List – Outlines the substances and methods prohibited in sport;
- International Standard for Testing and Investigations (ISTI) – test planning and sample collection process;
- International Standard for Laboratories (ISL) – Standard for the caliber of laboratories that can process athlete samples;
- International Standard for Therapeutic Use Exemptions (ISTUE) – The approval process for allowing athletes to obtain exemptions for prohibited substances when a legitimate medical reason exists;
- International Standard for Protection of Privacy and Personal Information (ISPPPI) – Privacy protections when collecting and using athlete personal information.

The International Olympic Committee (IOC) required that all Olympic sports adopt the World Anti-Doping Code prior to August 13, 2004.

=== Testing ===
The USADA Protocol for Olympic and Paralympic Movement Testing outlines the organization's testing program and is consistent with the WADA Code and International Standard for Testing. USADA collects both blood and urine samples during in-competition and out-of-competition tests, which can occur at any time, at any location, and without advance notice. Comprehensive, no-notice testing programs like USADA's that are consistent with the WADA Code have often been referred to as Olympic style drug testing.

The United States Olympic and Paralympic Committee (USOPC), USOPC-recognized National Governing Bodies for sport (NGBs), and the World Anti-doping Agency (WADA) Code have authorized USADA to test and adjudicate anti-doping rule violations for any athlete who:

- Is a member or license holder of a sport National Governing Body (NGB)
- Is participating at an Event or Competition sanctioned by the USOPC or an NGB or participating at an Event or Competition in the United States sanctioned by an International Federation (IF)
- Is a foreign athlete who is present in the United States
- Has given his/her consent to testing by USADA or who has submitted a Whereabouts Filing to USADA or an IF within the previous 12 months and has not given his or her NGB and USADA written notice of retirement
- Has been named by the USOPC or an NGB to an international team or who is included in the USADA Registered Testing Pool ("USADA RTP") or is competing in a qualifying event to represent the USOPC or NGB in international competition
- Is a United States athlete or foreign athlete present in the United States who is serving a period of Ineligibility on account of an anti-doping rule violation and who has not given prior written notice of retirement from all sanctioned competition to the applicable NGB and USADA, or the applicable foreign anti-doping agency or foreign sport association
- Is being tested by USADA under authorization from the USOPC, an NGB, IF, any NADO, WADA, the International Olympic Committee ("IOC"), the International Paralympic Committee ("IPC") or the organizing committee of any Event or Competition.

USADA does testing for International Federations (IFs), other National Anti-Doping Organizations (NADOs), and the World Anti-Doping Agency. USADA does not test at the Olympic Games. The Local Organizing Committee for the Olympic Games and WADA oversee testing at the Games.

USADA maintains a group of elite athletes as part of its registered testing pool (RTP). Consistent with the WADA Code, athletes in this pool are subject to strict whereabouts requirements in which they must inform the organization of their whereabouts (specific locations) at all times so they can be located for no-notice testing. Critics of WADA Code whereabouts requirements have criticized the requirement as overly strict, while proponents claim the requirement ensure athletes cannot evade tests and take advantage of testing gaps.

USADA determines its test distribution plan (TDP) or the determination of who, when, and where the organization tests through a combination of many factors that are consistent with the WADA IST. Factors for determining tests may include:

- Physical demands of the sport and possible performance-enhancing effect that doping may elicit
- Available doping analysis statistics
- Available research on doping trends
- The history of doping in the sport and/or discipline
- Training periods and the competition calendar, season
- Information received on possible doping practices
- Resources aimed at the detection of doping may be specifically targeted.

Even though testing may be described as random, the term "random" is inaccurate, as USADA uses various factors to strategically plan when and where they test athletes. High-profile or elite athletes are tested significantly more frequently than others.

USADA's sample collection process is also consistent with the WADA IST and tests are conducted by doping control officers (DCOs), who are employed and extensively trained by USADA. For tests in which blood is collected, USADA contracts trained phlebotomists who work in conjunction with a USADA DCO.

In accordance with the WADA International Standard for Laboratories, all samples are analyzed at laboratories that have been accredited by the World Anti-Doping Agency. In the United States there are only two WADA-accredited labs: the UCLA Olympic Analytical Laboratory in Los Angeles, CA., and the Sports Medicine Research and Testing Laboratory (SMRTL) in Salt Lake City, Utah. WADA accredited labs comply with the WADA International Standard for Laboratories.

=== Results management ===
In compliance with the World Anti-Doping Code and relevant international standards, USADA is charged with handling the results management and adjudication process for U.S. athletes in Olympic, Paralympic, Pan American and ParaPan American Sport. This independent results management process removes the inherent conflict of interest associated with sport organizations trying to both promote and police their sports.

Results management involves processing and communicating the results of drug tests, as well as the adjudication of potential anti-doping rule violations (ADRVs), which can be the result of a positive drug test or an investigation. According to the Code, an ADRV consists of the following:

- Presence of a prohibited substance or its metabolites or markers in an athlete's sample
- Use or attempted use by an athlete of a prohibited substance or a prohibited method
- Evading, refusing, or failing to submit to sample collection
- Violation of applicable requirements regarding athlete availability for out-of-competition testing, including failure to file required whereabouts information and missed tests
- Any combination of three missed tests and/or filing failures, as defined in the International Standard for Testing and Investigations, within a 12-month period by an athlete in a Registered Testing Pool * Tampering or attempted tampering with any part of doping control
- Possession of a prohibited substance or a prohibited method
- Trafficking or attempted trafficking of any prohibited substance or prohibited method
- Administration or attempted administration to any athlete in-competition of any prohibited substance or prohibited method, or administration or attempted administration to any athlete out-of-competition of any prohibited substance or any prohibited method that is prohibited out-of-competition
- Complicity: Assisting, encouraging, aiding, abetting, conspiring, covering up, or any other type of intentional complicity involving an anti-doping rule violation, or attempted anti-doping rule violation
- Association by an athlete or other person subject to the authority of an Anti-Doping Organization in a professional or sport-related capacity with any athlete support person who is serving a period of ineligibility related to one of the above ADRVs; and/or has been convicted outside of sport to have engaged in conduct that would be considered an ADRV.

When evidence meeting one or more of the above violations is found, an independent anti-doping review board will make the recommendation whether USADA should move forward with a sanction. Athletes can either accept or challenge the sanction through an established legal process. In the United States, athletes can take a case before an arbitration panel (American Arbitration Association / North American Court of Arbitration for Sport) and make a final appeal to the Court of Arbitration for Sport.

Sanctions normally include one or more of the following:

- Disqualification of results in a particular competition or event
- Forfeiture of any medals, points, and prizes
- Team disqualification and forfeiture
- An ineligibility period that may vary according to circumstances
- Public announcement
- Name and offense listed on USADA's website indefinitely

Sanctions have ranged from public warnings or time served for completing education (often the case for marijuana offenses), to life-time bans for repeated or particularly egregious cases. USADA maintains a sanctions list of all sanctioned athletes on its website.

=== Drug Reference Resources and Therapeutic Use Exemptions (TUE) ===
Athletes subject to testing by USADA have access to a number of resources designed to help athletes understand prohibited substances and if specific medications are prohibited according to the WADA prohibited List. In addition to a drug reference phone line, where athletes can speak to an expert, USADA has partnered with Antidoping Switzerland (ADCH), UK Anti-Doping (UKAD), and the Canadian Centre for Ethics in Sport (CCES) to provide the Global Drug Reference Online (GlobalDRO) tool. The tool allows athletes to search for the prohibited or not-prohibited status of a medication, by brand or generic drug name, as well as ingredients.

== Other programs ==
=== Science and research ===
In the years 2001-2009, USADA budgeted $2 million per year to support research that advanced the deterrence and detection of performance-enhancing drugs in sport. USADA supported research in a variety of areas, including anabolic steroids, growth hormone, oxygen transport-enhancing substances, genetic doping, ethics, and Isotope Ratio Mass Spectrometry.

Since 2009, the majority of anti-doping research activities previously undertaken by USADA has been assumed by the Partnership for Clean Competition. The Partnership for Clean Competition (PCC) was founded in 2008 by the U.S. Olympic Committee, the National Football League, Major League Baseball, and the U.S. Anti-Doping Agency as a Washington D.C. non-profit corporation.

=== Education and outreach ===
USADA focuses on deterring the use of performance-enhancing drugs in sport through education efforts that are targeted at elite-level athletes, as well as other levels of sport, youth athletes, and the general public. In addition to topics surrounding performance-enhancing drug use in sport, USADA claims to be an important promoter of other positive values associated with sport (sportsmanship, respect, teamwork.) In March 2011, USADA released a research report titled "What Sport Means in America: A Study of Sports Role In Society". The report aimed to measure the value of sport in American society and attitudes about the importance of protecting sport's integrity.

=== Supplements ===
USADA created an online resource designed to provide athletes with the best possible information to evaluate the risks associated with the use of supplements. On Supplement411.org there is information to help athletes realize that risk exists, recognize risk when they see it, and reduce their risk of testing positive or experiencing harmful health effects from the use of dietary supplements.

=== UFC Anti-Doping Program ===
At the time of its launch in June 2015, the Ultimate Fighting Championship (UFC) Anti-Doping Program became the first independent anti-doping program in major fighting sports.

To familiarize athletes to the program, the UFC and USADA launched a joint education campaign, meeting athletes for in-person education sessions at gyms and events around the world. By the end of 2016, the Program had hosted at least 25 in-person education seminars internationally. Athletes were additionally provided access to anti-doping resources via USADA.

USADA's UFC Anti-Doping Program began testing athletes both in and out-of-competition at increasing rates. In the first 18 months of the Program, more than 2,000 tests were completed. The Program's testing pool has also grown to include around 550 athletes worldwide, with tests collected in nearly 20 countries.

On September 28, 2018, it was reported that UFC and USADA would no longer immediately announce potential doping violations within the UFC roster. Instead, all fighters would be given the opportunity of an adjudication process before an announcement of the potential violation. This agreement came after several cases of fighters including Junior dos Santos, Josh Barnett and Cris Cyborg were flagged for potential doping violations, but later had their respective punishments dismissed after it was found that the fighters had unintentionally consumed, or otherwise ingested, performance enhancing drug (usually in the form of contaminated supplements).

In January 2021, USADA announced that UFC fighters would no longer be punished for cannabis use except in extreme cases where clear signs of intoxication were present at the time of a fight.

In October 2023, USADA announced that they would no longer oversee the UFC's anti-doping program once their contract with the company ends in December 2023. The announcement coincided with the return of prolific UFC fighter Conor McGregor to the USADA testing pool after withdrawing from testing in 2022 after sustaining a severe injury. In the statement released by USADA, CEO Travis Tygart stated that "[USADA had] been clear and firm with the UFC that there should be no exception given by the UFC for McGregor to fight until he has returned two negative tests and been in the pool for at least six months.", confirming speculation surrounding the involvement of McGregor's UFC-roster eligibility in the split between USADA and the UFC.

== Notable prosecutions ==
=== Lance Armstrong ===
In June 2012, USADA charged retired cyclist Lance Armstrong with an anti-doping rule violation. The charges followed a dropped federal investigation involving charges relating to Armstrong's time on the US Postal Service professional cycling team (1998–2004). Armstrong sued USADA claiming that USADA did not have jurisdiction to bring a case forward, and that if forced to arbitrate his case, he would not receive due process. In Armstrong v. United States Anti-Doping Agency and Travis Tygart, Armstrong lost his battle with USADA, as the District Court found sufficiency within USA Cycling's agreement with the USOC to adhere to the USADA Protocol.

The District Court found, that as a member of USA Cycling, Armstrong was thereby beholden to the USADA Protocol, which required that all contested charges of doping be tried through NAS and CAS arbitration. In its decision, the District Court noted that other federal courts have held similar, limited views on the role that federal courts should play regarding eligibility and arbitration issues within Olympic sports. Echoing the holdings of Slaney v. The International Amateur Athletic Federation and Harding v. U.S. Figure Skating Association, the District Court held that "federal courts should not interfere with an amateur sports organization's disciplinary procedures unless the organization shows wanton disregard for its rules, to the immediate and irreparable harm of a plaintiff, where the plaintiff has no other available remedy." The lawsuit was ultimately dismissed. On August 23, 2012; Armstrong announced he would not take part in arbitration. While he maintained his innocence, he contended that he could not take part in a "one-sided and unfair" process. In response, Armstong was given a life ban by USADA from competing in any sport that uses the World Anti-Doping Code, effectively ending his competitive career. He was also stripped of his seven Tour de France titles from 1999 to 2005.

A month later, USADA released a 200-page "reasoned decision" in accordance with WADA protocol. It named Armstrong as the ringleader of "the most sophisticated, professionalized and successful doping program that sport has ever seen." In response to Armstrong's argument that the eight-year statute of limitations for doping offenses had long since expired, USADA replied that the statute of limitations for doping offenses did not apply because of Armstrong's "fraudulent concealment" of his doping. Longstanding precedent in U.S. law holds that the statute of limitations does not apply in cases of fraudulent conduct by a defendant.

Based on evidence received during the Armstrong investigation and its prosecutions, USADA forwarded its "reasoned decision" document and supporting information to the Union Cycliste International, the World Anti-Doping Agency, and the World Triathlon Corporation. USADA claimed that:

... the evidence shows beyond any doubt that the US Postal Service Pro Cycling Team (USPS Team) ran the most sophisticated, professionalized and successful doping program that sport has ever seen. The evidence of the USPS Team-run scheme is overwhelming and is in excess of 1000 pages, and includes sworn testimony from 26 people, including 15 riders with knowledge of the USPS Team and its participants' doping activities. The evidence also includes direct documentary evidence including financial payments, emails, scientific data and laboratory test results that further prove the use, possession and distribution of performance enhancing drugs by Lance Armstrong and confirm the disappointing truth about the deceptive activities of the USPS Team, a team that received tens of millions of American taxpayer dollars in funding.

— Travis Tygart, CEO, USADA, October 2012.

=== BALCO investigation ===
The Bay Area Laboratory Co-operative (BALCO) was a San Francisco Bay Area business that supplied anabolic steroids to professional athletes. BALCO was founded by Victor Conte, who sourced the drugs from Illinois chemist Patrick Arnold and distributed them with the help of personal trainer Greg Anderson. Together, they sold substances like erythropoietin and human growth hormone undetected from 1988 until 2002, when the official federal investigation of BALCO began.

In the summer of 2003, USADA investigators received a syringe with trace amounts of a mysterious substance and launched their own investigation. The syringe went to Don Catlin, MD, the founder and then-director of the UCLA Olympic Analytical Laboratory, who had developed a testing process for the substance, tetrahydrogestrinone (THG). He tested 550 existing samples from athletes, of which 20 proved to be positive for THG.

A number of athletes, including Marion Jones, Kelli White, British sprinter Dwain Chambers, shot putter Kevin Toth, middle-distance runner Regina Jacobs, and hammer throwers John McEwen and Melissa Price were subsequently incriminated in the investigation.

=== TJ Dillashaw ===
In April 2019, UFC bantamweight champion TJ Dillashaw voluntarily relinquished his title, after adverse findings in a USADA test before his fight with Henry Cejudo. The test showed that Dillashaw tested positive for EPO, which he admitted to using. Blood doping was not commonly tested for in the UFC by that point, making this a milestone case.

== Conflict with WADA ==
On 7 August 2024, the World Anti-Doping Agency accused the United States Anti-Doping Agency (USADA) of having permitted athletes caught doping to compete as undercover agents in order to identify other drug cheats. WADA stated that it discovered at least three cases of athletes who had violated anti-doping rules and were permitted to compete for years while serving as undercover agents for USADA. On August 8, 2024, the China Anti-Doping Agency (CHINADA) strongly urged that an independent investigation be conducted into the matter. On 8 September 2024, WADA confirmed it has begun a compliance review of USADA.

== See also ==
- Doping in the United States
- List of drugs banned from the Olympics
- Use of performance-enhancing drugs in sport
