= Victor Conte =

American musician (1950–2025)

Victor Conte Jr.
- Born: July 10, 1950; Fresno, California
- Died: November 3, 2025 (aged 75); San Mateo, California
- Occupations: Musician; businessman
- Known for: Bay Area Laboratory Co-operative
- Relatives: Bruce Conte (cousin)
- Musical career
- Also known as: Walkin' Fish
- Genres: Blues rock; funk; R&B
- Instrument: Bass guitar
- Years active: 1969–1979
- Formerly of: Pure Food and Drug Act; Tower of Power

Victor Conte Jr. (July 10, 1950 – November 3, 2025) was an American musician and businessman who was the founder and president of Bay Area Laboratory Co-operative (BALCO), which is now defunct. BALCO was a sports nutrition center in California. In the late 1970s, Conte played bass with funk and R&B group Tower of Power, appearing on the band's 1978 release We Came to Play!.

Conte served time in prison in 2005 after pleading guilty to conspiracy to distribute steroids and to money laundering. He later operated Scientific Nutrition for Advanced Conditioning (SNAC Nutrition).

== Early life and music career ==
Victor Conte Jr. was born in Fresno, California, on July 10, 1950, to Shirley and Victor Conte Sr. He was the oldest of three children in a working-class Italian family. Conte graduated from McLane High School, and received an athletic scholarship from Fresno State University for his talent as a runner. Instead, he attended Fresno City College but dropped out of college in 1969 after being convinced by his cousin, musician Bruce Conte, to join the band Common Ground as its bass player. In 1970, he quit playing in Common Ground and joined the band Pure Food and Drug Act.

At the time, Conte's nickname was "Walkin' Fish", due to his unusual way of moving across the stage when he was performing. He left Pure Food and Drug Act some time prior to 1977. He was a member of Tower of Power from 1977 until 1979 playing bass guitar. He also collaborated during that period with pianist Herbie Hancock and violinist Sugarcane Harris.

== Bay Area Laboratory Co-operative ==
In 1984, Conte founded the Bay Area Laboratory Co-operative (BALCO), a sports nutrition center first located in Millbrae, California and later relocated to Burlingame, California. The United States Anti-Doping Agency (USADA) says he developed the banned steroid tetrahydrogestrinone (nicknamed "The Clear") with the help of bodybuilding chemist Patrick Arnold. Pursuant to a plea bargain struck with prosecutors, he entered guilty pleas in July 2005 to one count of conspiracy to distribute steroids and a second count of laundering a portion of a check. He was sentenced in October of the same year to four months in the federal Taft Correctional Institution in Taft, California, with four months on house arrest.

In a December 2004 interview with Martin Bashir on ABC's 20/20 program, he admitted to running doping programs which have broken Olympic records. He said, "The whole history of the games is just full of corruption, cover-up, performance-enhancing drug use." In the interview he implicated five-time Olympic gold medalist Marion Jones and her partner Tim Montgomery, Kelli White (who later admitted using performance-enhancing drugs), sprinter Dwain Chambers, NFL linebacker Bill Romanowski, and others.

On December 21, 2006, Yahoo Sports reported that one of Conte's initial defense lawyers, Troy Ellerman, had been targeted by the FBI as a possible source of leaks to the media during the Barry Bonds probe. On February 14, 2007, Ellerman pleaded guilty to leaking grand jury testimony. It was also reported that FBI agents were an additional source of leaks. In May 2007, Conte claimed to be again providing supplements for Dwain Chambers, who left track and field to play in the NFL Europa league for the Hamburg Sea Devils before returning to athletics in 2008. According to Conte, the nutritional supplements provided via his company Scientific Nutrition for Advanced Conditioning, are perfectly legal.

On December 13, 2007, Conte appeared on CNN before The Mitchell Report was officially released.

== Books ==
Game of Shadows: Barry Bonds, BALCO, and the Steroids Scandal that Rocked Professional Sports was published by two San Francisco Chronicle investigative reporters in 2006, relating to the case. There have been controversies about the informant and/or source of the information about the books and related court cases.

In 2008, in the aftermath of the investigation, Conte wrote a book BALCO: The Straight Dope on Barry Bonds, Marion and What We Can Do to Save Sports which was co-written with author Nathan Jendrick. There was defamation litigation about the book's publication by boxer Shane Mosley which delayed the publication date. Mosley dropped the lawsuit, but not before Skyhorse Publishing had been scared away from publishing it. The book is officially unpublished as of 2017, but the unpublished manuscript has been made available.

== Scientific Nutrition for Advanced Conditioning ==
In 2011 Conte started a new company, Scientific Nutrition for Advanced Conditioning (SNAC) which is based in San Carlos, California, which in addition to nutritional supplements also offers boxing and sports training. One of SNAC's clients is boxer Zab Judah; Conte had previously worked with Andre Berto, Nonito Donaire, and Andre Ward.

== Personal life and death ==
Conte was married to Mandy Tubbs, with whom he raised three daughters. Conte died from pancreatic cancer at home in San Mateo, California on November 3, 2025, at the age of 75.
