= Patrick Arnold =

American organic chemist (1966–2026)

- Born: July 10, 1966; Guilford, Connecticut, U.S.
- Died: May 12, 2026 (aged 59); Guilford, Connecticut, U.S.
- Known for: Father of Prohormones
- Scientific career
- Education: University of New Haven
- Fields: Organic chemistry

Patrick Arnold (July 10, 1966 – May 12, 2026) was an American organic chemist known for introducing androstenedione, 1-androstenediol, and methylhexanamine into the dietary supplement market, and for creating the designer steroid tetrahydrogestrinone, also known as THG and "the clear". THG, along with two other anabolic steroids that Arnold manufactured (norbolethone and desoxymethyltestosterone (DMT)), not banned at the time of their creation, were hard-to-detect drugs at the heart of the BALCO professional sports doping scandal. BALCO distributed these worldwide to world-class athletes in a wide variety of sports ranging from track and field to professional baseball and football.

Arnold also reintroduced methylhexanamine into the market as a dietary supplement under the mark Geranamine, a substance that has gained popularity.

He was also an amateur bodybuilder, initially gaining notoriety as "the Father of Prohormones."

== Early life and career ==
Arnold was born July 10, 1966, and grew up in Guilford, Connecticut. At age 11 he started working out after his father gave him a set of weights. During the late 1970s and early 1980s, despite following protein diets, he grew frustrated with his inability to put on much muscle mass. According to his version of events, Arnold's first contact with steroids happened when "a guy in a gym got him a cheap counterfeit steroid that contained just enough methyltestosterone that it added 10 pounds of muscle in all the right places." This sparked his interest in chemistry, and in 1990 Arnold graduated with a bachelor's degree in chemistry from the University of New Haven.

After graduation Arnold took a lab job in New Jersey that allowed him enough free time to research performance enhancers. He also took classes on organic synthesis at the University of Connecticut and Montclair State, and "devoured" books on supplements and steroids, studying both approved and unapproved Western drugs and those used by the East Germans in their doping heyday.

In 1996 Arnold befriended Dan Duchaine, who introduced him to Stan Antosh, the owner of Osmo Therapy, a supplement company then based in San Francisco. Antosh persuaded Arnold to move his research to a small company in Seymour, Illinois, called Bar North America, which was owned by Ramlakhan Boodram. In Seymour, Arnold reviewed old patents looking for drugs that had never made it to market or were used only briefly. Later that year he introduced androstenedione, also known as "andro," to the North American market, which became successful after Mark McGwire was found using it. But, because their company did not sell andro directly to consumers, but only as an ingredient to other supplement makers, Arnold missed out on a financial windfall.

In 2001 Arnold's company introduced the prohormone 1-Androstenediol, under the marketing name 1-AD. Like andro, 1-AD is a prohormone that is easily converted by the body into 1-testosterone, and it sold well. But the boom was short-lived. In January 2005 an amendment to the federal Controlled Substances Act banned prohormones. The company lost 60% of their sales, and became unprofitable.

According to Arnold, Victor Conte contacted him in 2000 seeking undetectable drugs. Arnold offered norbolethone, which he had synthesized in 1998. About this new venture Arnold recalls, "I didn't feel I was jumping into anything more than [a potential problem] with a sports governing body," and attributes his motivation for involvement to his curiosity about the responsiveness of well-trained athletes, as well as pride in his own work. In 2001 Arnold switched to providing Conte with tetrahydrogestrinone after norbolethone started to draw scrutiny from drug testers.

== Personal life and death ==
In 2006, Arnold was sentenced to three months in prison at Federal Correctional Institution, Morgantown in West Virginia followed by three months of house arrest for his role in the BALCO scandal.

Arnold died in Guilford, Connecticut on May 12, 2026, at the age of 59.
