= Greg Anderson (trainer) =

American personal trainer (born 1966)

Greg F. Anderson
- Born: February 1966 (age 60)
- Occupation: Personal trainer

Greg F. Anderson (born February 1966) is an American personal trainer, best known for his work with baseball player Barry Bonds, and links with BALCO.

== Biography ==
=== Early life ===
When Anderson was 10 years old, his father died after being shot during a gambling dispute. Anderson and Barry Bonds began a lifelong friendship when the two played middle-school baseball together in California. Bonds flourished as the team's star, while Anderson struggled to get playing time. In college, Anderson began an obsession with weight-lifting and spent long hours in the gym. He played college baseball at Fort Hays State University in Hays, Kansas with moderate success, but was advised by his coach to find a career outside of professional baseball. Soon after, Anderson moved back to California where he spent most of his time at the World Gym, now known as Diesel Fitness, only a few blocks away from BALCO.

=== Steroid troubles ===
Anderson allegedly began providing Bonds with performance-enhancing drugs in 1998. He was also linked in this regard to both Jason Giambi and Gary Sheffield, through his connections with Bonds. Despite this information, the San Francisco Giants, allegedly in order to appease Bonds, did not bar Anderson from Giants' facilities. On July 15, 2005, Anderson, in a deal with federal prosecutors, pleaded guilty to conspiracy to distribute steroids and to money-laundering. On October 18, 2005, he was sentenced by U.S. District Court Judge Susan Illston to three months in prison and three months' home confinement.

Anderson and his steroid dealings are referred to in the book Game of Shadows, which documents the steroid use of many Major League Baseball players and other notable athletes.

=== Contempt of Court ===
On July 5, 2006, Anderson was found in contempt of court by U.S. District Judge William Alsup for refusing to testify before a federal grand jury investigating perjury accusations against San Francisco Giants' player Barry Bonds. Bonds appeared before a grand jury investigating the BALCO steroids case in December 2003 and is reported to have denied knowingly using performance-enhancing drugs. Anderson, denied bail, was immediately sent to the Federal Correctional Institution in Dublin, California. Anderson's attorney, Mark Geragos, said he would file an appeal based on his assertion that the subpoena to testify violated Anderson's plea bargain agreement in the BALCO case.

On July 20, 2006, Anderson was released when the grand jury's term expired without indicting Bonds. However, Anderson was immediately subpoenaed to testify before a new grand jury that took up the case. Anderson's attorney, Mark Geragos, stated that Anderson would still refuse to testify, and on August 28, Anderson was again found in contempt of court and sentenced to prison.

On November 15, 2007, a federal judge ordered Anderson released from prison. This order came just hours after Bonds was indicted by a federal grand jury on four counts of perjury and one count of obstruction of justice.

=== Further legal troubles ===
On January 28, 2009, twenty federal agents raided the home of Anderson's mother-in-law; both she and Anderson's wife are the targets of a tax probe. Anderson's attorney Mark Geragos says that he believes the probe is in retaliation for Anderson's continued refusal to say if he will testify in the upcoming 2009 Bonds perjury trial. Federal prosecutors have asked the presiding judge, U.S. District Judge Susan Illston, to find Anderson in contempt of court and have him detained in federal prison for the length of the upcoming trial. On March 22, 2011, Anderson was reincarcerated in the Federal Correctional Institution, Dublin on fresh contempt charges for refusing to testify at Bond's perjury trial. He was released as of April 8, 2011.
