= Bay Area Laboratory Co-operative =

American company

Coordinates: 37.595833°N 122.368889°W

The Bay Area Laboratory Co-operative (BALCO) was an American company that operated from 1983 to 2003 led by founder and owner Victor Conte.

In 2003, journalists Lance Williams and Mark Fainaru-Wada investigated the company's role in a drug sports scandal later referred to as the BALCO scandal. BALCO marketed tetrahydrogestrinone ("the Clear"), a then-undetected, performance-enhancing steroid developed by chemist Patrick Arnold. Conte, BALCO vice president James Valente, weight trainer Greg Anderson and coach Remi Korchemny had supplied a number of high-profile sports stars from the United States and Europe with "the Clear" and human growth hormone for several years.

== History ==
Headquartered in Burlingame, California, BALCO was founded in 1983. Officially, BALCO was a service business for blood and urine analysis and food supplements. In 1988, Victor Conte offered free blood and urine tests to a group of athletes known as the BALCO Olympians. He then was allowed to attend the Summer Olympics in Seoul, South Korea. From 1996, Conte worked with well-known American football star Bill Romanowski, who proved to be useful to establish new connections to athletes and coaches such as Korchemny. Conte and Korchemny shortly thereafter founded the ZMA Track Club for marketing purposes, well-known members of it being sprinters Marion Jones and Tim Montgomery. In 2000, Conte managed to contact American baseball star Barry Bonds via Greg Anderson, a coach working in a nearby fitness studio. Bonds then delivered contacts to other baseball professionals.

== Scandal ==
In 2003, the United States Attorney for the Northern District of California began investigating BALCO. That June, U.S. sprint coach Trevor Graham made an anonymous phone call to the United States Anti-Doping Agency (USADA), accusing a number of athletes of being involved in doping with a steroid that was not detectable at the time. He also named Victor Conte as the source of the steroid. As evidence, Graham delivered a syringe containing traces of tetrahydrogestrinone (THG), nicknamed "the Clear."

Shortly after, Don Catlin, MD, the founder of the UCLA Olympic Analytical Laboratory, developed a testing process for tetrahydrogestrinone. Now able to detect the new substance, he tested 550 existing samples from athletes, of which 20 proved to be positive for THG.

On September 3, 2003 agents of the Internal Revenue Service, Food and Drug Administration, San Mateo Narcotics Task Force, and United States Anti-Doping Agency conducted a search of the BALCO facilities. Alongside lists of BALCO customers in a BALCO field warehouse they found containers whose labels indicated steroids and growth hormones. In a search at Anderson's home two days later, steroids, $60,000 in cash, names lists and dosage plans were found.

Among the athletes listed in the record of BALCO customers were:

- Major League Baseball: Barry Bonds, Benito Santiago, Jeremy Giambi, Bobby Estalella, Armando Rios
- Athletics: Hammer thrower John McEwen, shot putters Kevin Toth and C.J. Hunter, sprinters Dwain Chambers, Marion Jones, Tim Montgomery, Zhanna Block and Kelli White, middle-distance runner Regina Jacobs. (Christos Tzekos and his athletes were initially connected to BALCO but later cleared.)
- Boxing: Shane Mosley.
- Cycling: Tammy Thomas.
- National Football League: A number from the Oakland Raiders, including Bill Romanowski, Tyrone Wheatley, Barret Robbins, Chris Cooper and Dana Stubblefield.
- Judo: The 1988 U.S. Olympic judo team coached by Willy Cahill of San Bruno, California.
- Swimming: Amy van Dyken

Patrick Arnold, BALCO's chemist, alleges that Bonds and Gary Sheffield were given "the Clear," though the athletes deny knowing about it and Arnold does not claim to have witnessed it.

In April 2005, Lance Williams and Mark Fainaru-Wada were honored with the journalist prize of the White House Correspondents' Association. In 2006, they published the book Game of Shadows, which consists of a summary of about 200 interviews and 1,000 documents they collected for their research.

On July 15, 2005, Conte and Anderson cut plea bargains, pleaded guilty to illegal steroid distribution and money laundering and avoided an embarrassing trial. Conte spent four months in prison. Anderson was incarcerated for 13½ months. He was released on November 15, 2007, the same day Bonds was indicted by a federal grand jury on four counts of perjury and one count of obstruction of justice.

On June 6, 2006 the house of Arizona Diamondbacks player Jason Grimsley was searched as part of the ongoing BALCO probe. Grimsley later said that federal investigators wanted him to wear a wire in order to obtain information against Barry Bonds. He told people which players used performance-enhancing drugs. The final result was that the Diamondbacks released Grimsley, and he was given a 50-game suspension by Major League Baseball.

In October 2006, investigations against Fainaru-Wada and Williams were started. The reporters were served with subpoenas to appear before a grand jury to identify the individual who leaked Bonds' name to them. They refused to do so and federal prosecutors asked that they be jailed for up to 18 months (the typical term of a grand jury). However, in February 2007, federal prosecutors dropped charges against the reporters after a Colorado attorney, Troy Ellerman, who once represented Conte and another executive of the Bay Area Laboratory Co-operative, admitted to leaking the testimony and pleaded guilty to federal charges of unauthorized disclosure of grand jury testimony.

In an interview with Editor & Publisher, Lance Williams revealed that he would never testify in court, even if it did not involve confidential sources. "I have no interest in becoming anybody's witness."

On November 15, 2007, former San Francisco Giants outfielder Barry Bonds was indicted for perjury and obstruction of justice based on his grand jury testimony in this investigation. The trial began March 21, 2011, and he was convicted on April 13, 2011 on the obstruction of justice charge. The conviction was overturned upon appeal in April 2015.

On April 4, 2008, Tammy Thomas was convicted by a federal jury on three counts of making false statements to a federal grand jury in November 2003, and on one count of obstructing justice. She was acquitted of two perjury charges. Sentencing was set for July 18, 2008. She was sentenced to six months' house arrest and five years' probation on October 10, 2008.

On May 29, 2008, Trevor Graham was convicted by a federal jury on one count of lying to federal investigators about his relationship to an admitted steroids dealer, and the jury deadlocked on two other charges. Sentencing was set for September 5, 2008. He was sentenced to one year of house arrest on October 21, 2008.
