= Tetrahydrogestrinone =

Synthetic and orally active anabolic–androgenic steroid (AAS)

Clinical data
- Other names: THG; The Clear; 17α-Ethyl-18-methyl-δ^{9,11}-19-nortestosterone; 17α-Ethyl-18-methylestra-4,9,11-trien-17β-ol-3-one
- Routes of administration: By mouth, intramuscular injection
- Drug class: Androgen; Anabolic steroid; Progestogen

Legal status
- Legal status: US: Schedule III

Identifiers
- IUPAC name: (8S,13S,14S,17S)-13,17-diethyl-17-hydroxy-1,2,6,7,8,14,15,16-octahydrocyclopenta[a]phenanthren-3-one
- CAS Number: 618903-56-3
- PubChem CID: 6857686
- DrugBank: DB06870
- ChemSpider: 5257020
- UNII: 643MR6L9LB
- CompTox Dashboard (EPA): DTXSID60210901

Chemical and physical data
- Formula: C_{21}H_{28}O_{2}
- Molar mass: 312.453 g·mol^{−1}
- 3D model (JSmol): Interactive image
- SMILES: O=C1C=C2C(CC1)=C3C=C[C@@]4(CC)[C@@]([C@]3([H])CC2)([H])CC[C@]4(CC)O
- InChI: InChI=1S/C21H28O2/c1-3-20-11-9-17-16-8-6-15(22)13-14(16)5-7-18(17)19(20)10-12-21(20,23)4-2/h9,11,13,18-19,23H,3-8,10,12H2,1-2H3/t18-,19+,20+,21+/m1/s1; Key:OXHNQTSIKGHVBH-ANULTFPQSA-N

Tetrahydrogestrinone (THG), known by the nickname The Clear, is a synthetic and orally active anabolic–androgenic steroid (AAS) which was never marketed for medical use. It was developed by Patrick Arnold and was used by a number of high-profile athletes such as Barry Bonds and Dwain Chambers.

== Non-medical uses ==
THG was developed completely in secret by Patrick Arnold as a designer drug, on the basis that doping testers would be unlikely to detect a totally new compound. Arnold developed a chemical similar to two obscure steroids marketed by BALCO, norbolethone and desoxymethyltestosterone, which had been reported in scientific literature but never entered mass production, and the banned anabolic steroids trenbolone and gestrinone, the latter of which was used to synthesize it.

In 2003, whistleblower Trevor Graham passed a spent syringe containing a small amount of the drug to the United States Anti-Doping Agency. This was then transferred to the research group of pharmacologist Don Catlin, who identified the drug using mass spectrometry techniques and gave it its present name.

THG has never been fully tested for safety and has never entered legitimate medical use, although some studies have been made of its properties. A synthesis was devised to ensure a source of material for comparison and it was scheduled by the Food and Drug Administration (FDA) in 2005. Concerns have also been raised about its potential use in animals such as in horse-racing.

== Side effects ==
Side effects from prolonged use are likely to include infertility in both men and women, as well as other steroid side effects such as acne and hirsutism. Unlike most other anabolic steroids, THG also binds with high affinity to the glucocorticoid receptor, and while this effect may cause additional weight loss, it is also likely to cause additional side effects such as immunosuppression that are not seen with most other steroids.

== Pharmacology ==
=== Pharmacodynamics ===
THG is a highly potent agonist of the androgen and progesterone receptors, around 10 times more potent than the comparison drugs nandrolone or trenbolone, but with no estrogenic activity. It has been found to bind to the androgen receptor with similar affinity to dihydrotestosterone and produces growth of muscle tissue. According to Patrick Arnold, due to the drug's potency, he never had to supply significant quantities to BALCO, because "just a couple of drops under the tongue" were a sufficient dose.

When THG reaches the nucleus of a cell, it binds to the androgen receptor at the ligand-binding pocket. Here it changes the expression of a variety of genes, turning on several anabolic and androgenic functions. It is the ligand's structure which determines the number of interactions that can take place with the human androgen receptor ligand-binding domain. Even minor modifications in the ligand's structure have a great impact on the strength of the interactions this ligand has with the androgen receptor. THG, possessing a high affinity, establishes more van der Waals contacts with the receptor than with many other steroids. It is this higher affinity and specific geometry of THG which makes these interactions with the androgen receptor so strong, resulting in THG's potency.

== Chemistry ==
THG, also known as 17α-ethyl-18-methyl-δ^{9,11}-19-nortestosterone or as 17α-ethyl-18-methylestra-4,9,11-trien-17β-ol-3-one, is a synthetic estrane steroid and a 17α-alkylated derivative of nandrolone (19-nortestosterone). It is a modification of gestrinone (17α-ethynyl-18-methyl-19-nor-δ^{9,11}-testosterone) in which the ethynyl group has been hydrogenated into an ethyl group, thereby converting the steroid from a norethisterone (17α-ethynyl-19-nortestosterone) derivative with weak AR activity into a norethandrolone (17α-ethyl-19-nortestosterone) derivative with powerful AR activity. THG is closely related to RU-2309 (the 17α-methyl variant), trenbolone (δ^{9,11}-19-nortestosterone), metribolone (17α-methyl-δ^{9,11}-19-nortestosterone), and norboletone (17α-ethyl-18-methyl-19-nortestosterone).

== History ==
For a time, THG was considered the drug of choice for safe and "invisible" world record breaking in athletics, being used by several high-profile gold medal winners such as the sprinter Marion Jones, who resigned from her athletic career in 2007 after admitting to using THG prior to the 2000 Sydney Olympics, where she had won three gold medals. It has also been used by formerly banned British athlete Dwain Chambers, Major League Baseball left fielder Barry Bonds, and Major League Baseball first baseman Jason Giambi.

THG was developed by Patrick Arnold for the Bay Area Laboratory Co-operative (BALCO), which claimed to be a nutritional supplement company. The company manufactured the drug through palladium-charcoal catalyzed hydrogenation from gestrinone, a substance used in gynecology for treatment of endometriosis (Australian Medicines handbook 2011).

In 2003, U.S. sprint coach Trevor Graham delivered a syringe containing traces of THG to the United States Anti-Doping Agency (USADA). This helped Don Catlin, MD, the founder and then-director of the UCLA Olympic Analytical Lab, to identify and develop a test for THG, the second reported designer anabolic steroid.
