= Rock & Roll Is Here to Stay! =

Studio album by Sha Na Na
- Released: 1969
- Genre: Doo-wop; rock and roll
- Language: English
- Label: Kama Sutra
- Producer: Artie Ripp

Sha Na Na chronology
Rock & Roll Is Here to Stay! (1969)	Sha Na Na (1971)

Rock & Roll Is Here to Stay! is the debut album by American doo-wop and rock & roll group Sha Na Na, issued in 1969 and reissued in 1973.

== Reception ==
A brief review of the 1973 re-release of this album by Billboard recommended Rock & Roll Is Here to Stay!, calling Sha Na Na an "excellent oldies group". Jim Allen of AllMusic Guide reviewed a compact disc compilation of this album and the band's self-titled release, calling the music "reverential but energetic updates, making them seem fresh and vital for the new generation and keeping that crucial sense of fun intact".

== Track listing ==
Side one

1. "Remember Then" (Tony Powers, Beverly Ross, Stan Vincent) – 2:17
2. "Come Go with Me" (Clarence Quick) – 2:28
3. "Chantilly Lace" (J. P. Richardson) – 2:25
4. "Little Darling" (Maurice Williams) – 1:57
5. "Long Tall Sally" (Robert Blackwell, Enotris Johnson, Richard Penniman) – 3:04
6. "Book of Love" (Warren Davis, George Malone, Charles Patrick) – 1:56
7. "Rock and Roll Is Here to Stay" (David White) – 2:25

Side two

1. "Young Love" (Ric Cartey, Carole Joyner) – 2:20
2. "A Teenager in Love" (Doc Pomus, Mort Shuman) – 2:07
3. "Little Girl of Mine" (Herb Cox, Morris Levy) – 2:28
4. "Heartbreak Hotel" (Mae Boren Axton, Tommy Durden, Elvis Presley) – 2:30
5. "Teen Angel" (Jean Dinning, Red Surrey) – 3:15
6. "Silhouettes" (Bob Crewe, Frank C. Slay, Jr.) – 2:50
7. "Lovers Never Say Goodbye" (Terry "Buzzy" Johnson, Paul Wilson) – 2:45

== Personnel ==
Sha Na Na

- Bruce Clarke – bass guitar, vocals, lead vocals on "Little Girl of Mine"
- Elliot Cahn – rhythm guitar, vocals, lead vocals on "Little Darlin'" and "Lovers Never Say Goodbye"
- Alan Cooper – bass vocals, lead vocals on "Rock & Roll Is Here to Stay" and "Lovers Never Say Goodbye"
- David Garrett – vocals
- Frederick "Denny" Greene – vocals
- Henry Gross – lead guitar, vocals, lead vocals on "Remember Then" and "Long Tall Sally"
- Richard Joffe – vocals, lead vocals on "Come Go with Me"
- Rob Leonard – vocals, lead vocals on "Teen Angel"
- John "Jocko" Marcellino – drums, vocals, lead vocals on "Chantilly Lace"
- Scott Powell – vocals, lead vocals on "Heartbreak Hotel" and "Silhouettes"
- Joe Witkin – piano, vocals, lead vocals on "A Teenager in Love"
- Donald York – vocals, lead vocals on "Book of Love" and "Young Love"

Technical personnel

- Artie Ripp – production

== Charts ==
The initial release of Rock & Roll Is Here to Stay! spent at least three weeks on the Billboard Top LPs chart, peaking at 183 on December 13, 1969.

== See also ==
- List of 1969 albums
