= Sha Na Na (album) =

Rock & Roll Is Here to Stay!

Studio album by Sha Na Na
- Released: 1971
- Recorded: March 1, 1971 (side one), May 1971 (side two)
- Venues: Columbia University, New York City, New York (side one)
- Studios: Electric Lady, New York City, New York, US (side two)
- Genres: Doo-wop; rock and roll
- Length: 33:42
- Language: English
- Label: Kama Sutra
- Producer: Eddie Kramer

Sha Na Na chronology
Rock & Roll Is Here to Stay! (1969)	Rock & Roll Is Here to Stay! (1971)	The Night Is Still Young (1972)

Sha Na Na (also known as Shanana) is the second album by American doo-wop and rock & roll group Sha Na Na, issued in 1971. While the group's first album consisted of versions of well-known songs, their second collection was divided equally between cover versions and original songs, most of which were written by Scott Simon, the group's piano player.

== Reception ==
Jim Allen of AllMusic Guide reviewed a compact disc compilation of this album and the debut, calling the music "reverential but energetic updates, making them seem fresh and vital for the new generation and keeping that crucial sense of fun intact".

== Track listing ==
Side one

1. "Yakety Yak" (Jerry Leiber, Mike Stoller) – 1:43
2. "Jailhouse Rock (Leiber, Stoller)" – 2:08
3. "Duke of Earl" (Gene Chandler, Earl Edwards, Bernice Williams) – 1:50
4. "Tell Laura I Love Her" (Jeff Barry, Ben Raleigh) – 3:15
5. "Blue Moon" (Lorenz Hart, Richard Rodgers) – 2:25
6. "I Wonder Why" (Melvin Anderson, Ricardo Weeks) – 2:17
7. "Great Balls of Fire" (Otis Blackwell, Jack Hammer) – 1:58
8. "Rock and Roll Is Here to Stay" (David White) – 1:50

Side two

1. "Only One Song" (Scott Simon) – 3:30
2. "Depression" (Simon) – 2:37
3. "Canadian Money" (Simon) – 2:21
4. "Top Forty" (Simon) – 2:35
5. "Ruin Me Blues" (Simon) – 3:15
6. "Just a Friend" (John "Jocko" Marcellino) – 1:58

== Personnel ==
Sha Na Na

- Jon "Bowzer" Bauman – piano, vocals
- Lennie Baker – bass guitar, vocals
- Bruce Clarke – bass guitar, vocals
- Elliot Cahn – rhythm guitar, vocals
- Johnny Contando – vocals
- Chris Donald – guitar, vocals
- Frederick "Denny" Greene – vocals
- Richard Joffe – vocals
- John "Jocko" Marcellino – drums, vocals
- Scott Powell – vocals
- Screamin' Scott Simon – bass guitar, piano, vocals
- Donald York – vocals

Technical personnel

- Eddie Kramer – engineering, production

== Charts ==
The initial release of Rock & Roll Is Here to Stay! peaked at 122 on the Billboard 200.

== See also ==
- List of 1971 albums
