= List of artists and entertainers with advanced degrees =

This is a list of artists and entertainers with advanced degrees (PhDs and other academic degrees leading to the title of Doctor). Excluded are honorary degrees.

== Research doctorate ==
Person	Known for	Degree	Field	Institution
Robert Allan	Member of the band Glasvegas	PhD	Music	Glasgow University
Chad Allen	Actor	Psy.D.	Clinical psychology	Antioch University New England
Milo Aukerman	Member of the band Descendents	PhD	Biology	University of California, San Diego
Mayim Bialik	Actress	PhD	Neuroscience	University of California, Los Angeles
Jill Biden	former First Lady	EdD	Education	University of Delaware
Michael Bishop	Member of the band Gwar	PhD	Music	University of Virginia
Pietro Boselli	Model, engineer, and lecturer at UCL	PhD	Computational fluid dynamics	University College London
Ian Bostridge	Opera and lieder singer	DPhil	History	University of Oxford
Bill Bruford	Member of the bands Yes, King Crimson and U.K.	PhD	Music	University of Surrey
Michael Burns	Actor	DPhil	History	Yale University
Ellen Cleghorne	Actress and comedian	PhD	Performance studies	New York University
Alan Cooper	Member of the band Sha Na Na	PhD	Religious studies	Yale University
Max Cooper	Music producer	PhD	Computational biology	University of Nottingham
Bill Cosby	Actor and comedian	EdD	Education	University of Massachusetts Amherst
Brian Cox	Television presenter, physicist and former member of the bands D:Ream and Dare	PhD	Particle physics	University of Manchester
Don S. Davis	Actor	PhD	Theatre	Southern Illinois University Carbondale
Marcus Dillistone	Director	PhD	Film, media, and creative technologies	University of Portsmouth
Graeme Downes	Member of the band The Verlaines	PhD	Music	University of Otago
William Fawcett	Actor	PhD	Elizabethan drama	University of Nebraska–Lincoln
Runhild Gammelsæter	Member of the bands Thorr's Hammer and Khlyst	PhD	Cell physiology	University of Oslo
Cheddar Gorgeous (Michael John Atkins)	Drag queen	PhD	Anthropology	University of Manchester
Harold Gould	Actor	PhD	Theatre	Cornell University
Greg Graffin	Member of the band Bad Religion	PhD	Evolutionary biology	Cornell University
Dan Grimaldi	Actor	PhD	Data processing	City University of New York
David Grubbs	Member of the bands Squirrel Bait, Bastro, and Gastr del Sol.	PhD	English	University of Chicago
Sir Lenny Henry	Actor and comedian, co-founder of Comic Relief	PhD	Media arts	Royal Holloway, University of London
Dexter Holland	Member of the band The Offspring	PhD	Molecular biology	Keck School of Medicine, University of Southern California
Vijay Iyer	Jazz pianist and composer	PhD	Technology and the arts	University of California, Berkeley
Paul Janz	Member of the band Deliverance and a professor of systematic theology	PhD	Philosophical theology	University of Cambridge
Brendan Kavanagh	Pianist	PhD	English	University College Cork
Mark Kermode	Film critic	PhD	English literature	University of Manchester
Akash Khurana	Actor	PhD	Social sciences	Tata Institute of Social Sciences
Wagner Lamounier	Former member of the band Sepultura	DSc	Applied economics	Federal University of Viçosa
Robert A. Leonard	Member of the band Sha Na Na	PhD	Linguistics	Columbia University
CN Lester	Singer-songwriter	PhD	Music	University of Huddersfield
Annbjørg Lien	Musician	PhD	Hardanger fiddle	University of Agder
Ria Lina	Comedian and writer	PhD	Viral bioinformatics	University College London
Loretta Long	Actress	PhD	Urban education	University of Massachusetts Amherst
David Lowery	Member of the bands Camper Van Beethoven and Cracker	EdD	Education	University of Georgia
Enongo Lumumba-Kasongo aka "Sammus"	Rapper	PhD	Science and technology studies	Cornell University
Sir Brian May	Member of the band Queen	PhD	Astrophysics	Imperial College London
Adam Met	Member of the band AJR	PhD	International human rights law	University of Birmingham
Naeem Mohaiemen	Filmmaker, artist, writer	PhD	Anthropology	Columbia University
Roy Montgomery	Composer and member of the bands The Pin Group and Dadamah	PhD	Theatre and film studies	University of Canterbury
Sterling Morrison	Member of the band The Velvet Underground	PhD	Medieval studies	University of Texas at Austin
Christopher Nowinski	Professional wrestler	PhD	Behavioral neuroscience	Boston University
John O'Brien	Soccer player	PhD	Clinical psychology	Alliant International University
Niall O'Flaherty	Member of the band The Sultans of Ping	PhD	History of political thought	University of Cambridge
Shaquille O'Neal	Basketball player, actor, and rapper	EdD	Education	Barry University
Ethan Port	Member of the band Savage Republic	PhD	Mathematics	University of Southern California
Miuccia Prada	Fashion designer and businesswoman	PhD	Political science	University of Milan
Priyadarshini	Singaporean-Indian playback singer	PhD	Film music	University of Mysore
Rahul Ram	Member of the band Indian Ocean	PhD	Environmental toxicology	Cornell University
Dilshad Said	Kurdish musician	PhD	Music history	Mozarteum University Salzburg
Omar Sangare	Actor and writer	PhD		Aleksander Zelwerowicz National Academy of Dramatic Art
Robert Schneider	Member of the band The Apples in Stereo and record producer	PhD	Mathematics	Emory University
Simon Scott	Member of the band Slowdive and engineer	PhD	Musicology	University of the Arts London
Serrini	Singer-songwriter	PhD	Literary and cultural studies	University of Hong Kong
Sam Shepherd	Electronic music producer	PhD	Neuroscience	University College London
Rose Simpson	Member of the band The Incredible String Band	PhD	German literature	Aberystwyth University
Francesca Marie Smith	Actor and voice actor	PhD	Rhetoric and transmedia storyworlds	USC Annenberg
David Smythe	Founder member of The Rezillos	PhD	Geophysics	University of Glasgow
Dan Snaith	Canadian musician, best known by the stage name Caribou	PhD	Mathematics	Imperial College London
Maciej Stuhr	Actor	D.A.	Art	Aleksander Zelwerowicz National Academy of Dramatic Art
Billy Taylor	Jazz pianist, composer, broadcaster and educator	EdD	Music education	University of Massachusetts Amherst
Alejandro Toledo	Composer, saxophonist, and ethnomusicologist	PhD	Music performance	Goldsmiths, University of London
Gregg Turner	Member of the band Angry Samoans	PhD	Mathematics	Claremont Graduate University
Jared Van Snellenberg	Actor and neuroscientist	PhD	Psychology	Columbia University
Gala Varo (Jesús Meza Arroyo)	Drag queen and television personality	PhD	Biomedicine	University of Guadalajara
Robert Vaughn	Actor	PhD	Communications	University of Southern California
Indre Viskontas	Opera singer	PhD	Cognitive neuroscience	University of California, Los Angeles
Sophie Ward	Novelist and actress	PhD	English and comparative literature	Goldsmiths, University of London
Brian Wecht	Member of the band Ninja Sex Party	PhD	Particle physics	University of California, San Diego
Peter Weller	Actor	PhD	Italian Renaissance art history	University of California, Los Angeles
Shaun Wilson	Artist and filmmaker	PhD	Fine Arts Media Arts	University of Tasmania Flinders University
Graham Wiggins	Musician	DPhil	Solid-state physics	University of Oxford
Warren Zanes	Member of the band The Del Fuegos	PhD	Visual and cultural studies	University of Rochester

== Medical degree ==
In many countries, the first medical degree is the MBBS (with MD being reserved for higher doctorates), but holders of this degree are addressed as "doctor" while practising.

Person	Known for	Degree	Field	Institution
Mohan Agashe	Bollywood actor	MBBS, MD	Medicine, psychiatry	B. J. Medical College
Britt Baker	Professional wrestler	DMD	Dentistry	University of Pittsburgh
Alexander Borodin	Classical composer	MD	Medicine and chemistry	Medical-Surgical Academy, St Petersburg
Edgar Buchanan	Actor	DDS	Dentistry	North Pacific College School of Dentistry
Meiyang Chang	Bollywood actor, television host and singer	BDS	Dental surgery	Vokkaligara Sangha Dental College & Hospital
Graham Chapman	Member of the British comedy group Monty Python	MBBS	Medicine	St. Bartholomew's Medical College
Michael Crichton	Novelist and screenwriter	MD	Medicine	Harvard Medical School
Sir Arthur Conan Doyle	Author, creator of Sherlock Holmes	MBCM, MD	Medicine	University of Edinburgh Medical School
Graeme Garden	Scottish comedian and member of The Goodies	MBBS	Medicine	King's College London
Aditi Govitrikar	Bollywood actress	MBBS	Medicine	Grant Medical College
Ken Harrison	Member of the band Wild Strawberries	MD	Medicine	University of Toronto
Harry Hill	Actor and comedian	MBBS	Medicine	University of London
Ken Jeong	Actor and comedian	MD	Medicine	University of North Carolina at Chapel Hill
Kamran Rashid Khan	Rapper	DO	Osteopathic medicine	Michigan State University College of Human Medicine
Shriram Lagoo	Bollywood film and theatre actor	MBBS	Medicine	B. J. Medical College
Jonathan LaPaglia	Actor	MBBS	Medicine	University of Adelaide
James Lilja	Member of the band The Offspring	MD	Medicine	University of Pittsburgh School of Medicine
George Miller	Film director and screenwriter	MBBS	Medicine	University of New South Wales
Sir Jonathan Miller	Actor, writer, theatre director, and humourist	MBBChir	Medicine	University of Cambridge
Arko Pravo Mukherjee	Singer-songwriter and music composer	MBBS	Medicine	Burdwan Medical College.
Haing S. Ngor	Actor and gynecologist	MD	Medicine	University of Toulouse
Peter Ostrum	Actor	DVM	Veterinary medicine	Cornell University College of Veterinary Medicine
Sai Pallavi	Actress and dancer	MBBS	Medicine	Tbilisi State Medical University
Palash Sen	Member of the band Euphoria	MBBS	Medicine	University College of Medical Sciences
Pedro Juan Vázquez Bragan	Rapper and songwriter	MD	Medicine	Universidad Central del Caribe
Peter Wingfield	Actor	MD	Medicine	Robert Larner College of Medicine

== Other professional doctorates ==
In some countries, the Juris Doctor is the standard professional degree required to practise law, although the holder is usually not addressed as "doctor".

Person	Known for	Degree	Field	Institution
Jackie Fox	Member of the band The Runaways	JD	Law	Harvard Law School
Greg Giraldo	Comedian	JD	Law	Harvard Law School
Denny Greene	Member of the band Sha Na Na	JD	Law	Yale University
Hill Harper	Actor and writer	JD	Law	Harvard Law School
Staci Keanan	Actress	JD	Law	Southwestern Law School
Bridgit Mendler	Actress and singer-songwriter	JD	Law	Harvard Law School
Tom Rapp	Member of the band Pearls Before Swine	JD	Law	University of Pennsylvania Law School
William Sanderson	Actor	JD	Law	Memphis State University
Fred Thompson	Actor and U.S. senator	JD	Law	Vanderbilt University
Steve Young	American football player	JD	Law	Brigham Young University

== Incomplete or revoked doctorates ==
Rapper Roxanne Shante publicly claimed in the early 2000s to have received a master's and PhD in psychology from Cornell University. A 2009 investigation by Slate found no evidence she had received either degree, or a bachelor's. Shante then apologized, stating she had never received a PhD.

Person	Known for	Degree	Field	Institution	Notes
Ella Al-Shamahi	Stand-up comedian and television presenter	PhD	Anthropology	University College London	Studying as of 2021
Mira Aroyo	Member of the band Ladytron	DPhil	Molecular genetics	University of Oxford	Dropped out
Rowan Atkinson	Actor and comedian	PhD	Electrical engineering	University of Oxford	Dropped out
Corey Cerovsek	Classical violinist	PhD	Mathematics	Indiana University	Completed doctoral course work
Alan Coren	Humourist and writer	PhD	American literature	Yale University; University of California, Berkeley	Dropped out
David Duchovny	Actor	PhD		Yale University	Dropped out
James Franco	Actor and filmmaker	PhD	English	Yale University	Studying as of 2011
James Franco	Actor and filmmaker	PhD	Creative writing and literature	University of Houston	Accepted, did not enroll
Art Garfunkel	Singer and actor, member of the band Simon & Garfunkel	PhD	Mathematics education	Teachers College, Columbia University	Dropped out
Hong Jin-young	South Korean trot singer and entertainer	PhD	Business administration	Chosun University	Revoked
Ashley Judd	Actress	PhD	Public policy	University of California, Berkeley	Studying as of 2016
Bridgit Mendler	Actor and singer-songwriter	PhD	Technologies & social machines	Massachusetts Institute of Technology	On leave as of 2020
Ben Miller	Actor	PhD	Solid state physics	University of Cambridge	Dropped out
Jay Sean	Singer-songwriter	MBBS	Medicine	Queen Mary University of London	Dropped out
John Sessions	Actor	PhD	English literature	McMaster University	Dropped out
Xiumin	Singer and actor	PhD	Culture and arts	Hoseo University	Studying as of 2017
Lee Young-ae	Actress	PhD	Theater and cinema	Hanyang University	Studying as of 2009
Zhai Tianlin	Actor	PhD	Film science	Beijing Film Academy	Revoked
