= Dennis Yost =

American singer (1943–2008)

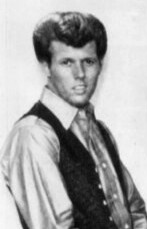
- Yost in 1968

Background information
- Born: July 20, 1943; Detroit, Michigan, U.S.
- Died: December 7, 2008 (aged 65) Hamilton, Ohio, U.S.
- Genres: Soft rock, southern rock, blue-eyed soul
- Occupation: Singer
- Years active: 1955–2005
- Label: Robox Records
- Formerly of: The Echoes; Classics IV

Dennis L. Yost (July 20, 1943 – December 7, 2008) was an American singer and the frontman of Classics IV.

== Early years ==
Dennis Yost was born on July 20, 1943, in Detroit. He and his family moved to Jacksonville when Dennis was 7. There, he began playing drums. While a student at Andrew Jackson High School, he joined a local band called The Echoes, in which he was also a singer.

== Classics IV ==
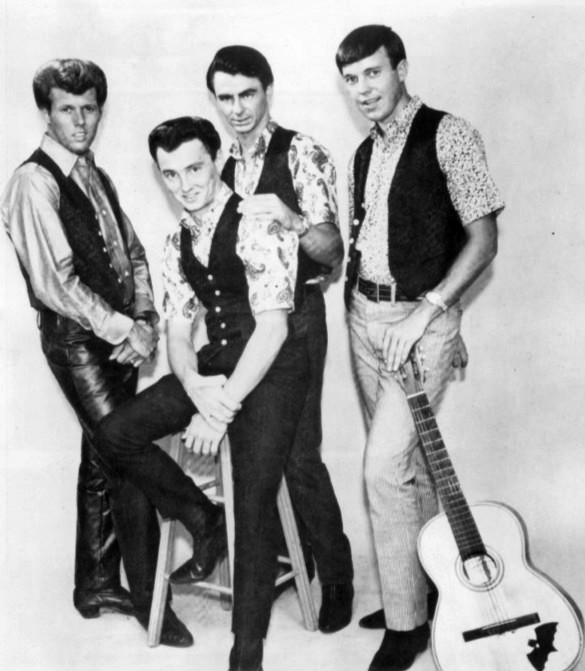
Yost (first from left) as part of the Classics IV in 1968

In 1965, after the Echoes broke up, Yost joined Le Roy and the Monarchs, a copy band founded by Walter “Wally” Eaton. James "J. R." Cobb also came on board on guitar along with Joe Wilson on keyboards. The band soon would change their name to The Classics. Yost took over vocals duties due to the strength and quality of his voice. When singing he would play his drums standing up.

The group was discovered performing at the Purple Porpoise in Daytona Beach by talent manager Alan Diggs, who was affiliated with the Lowery organization in Atlanta. Songwriter Buddy Buie was brought aboard as the group's co-manager and producer. The pair encouraged the band to relocate to Atlanta, where the band landed a deal with Capitol Records with the help of producer Bill Lowery.

The group released its debut single, "Pollyanna", written by Lowery songwriter Joe South. Despite being a regional hit, the group received complaints from a New York-based group with the same name, prompting them to add the "IV" to the name since there were four members at that time.

In 1967, The group landed a deal with Imperial Records. Throughout the next few years, the group released four albums and a slew of Top 40 hits, including "Spooky", "Stormy", and "Traces".

By 1970, as Yost was the remaining original member in the group, it changed its name again to Dennis Yost and the Classics IV. After Imperial was absorbed into United Artists Records, the group signed with MGM South. The band's subsequent releases were less successful, despite their final Top 40 hit "What Am I Crying For", which peaked at No. 39 in 1972. By this time, the partnership between Cochran and Buie ended.

== Later years ==
In 1975, Yost disbanded the group and returned to Florida to pursue fishing and a flooring business. A couple of years later, Yost returned to performing under the Holiday Inn circuit, this time solely under his own name or The Classic One. By this time, he had lost the rights to the Classics IV name.

In 1981, Yost released Going Through the Motions on Robox Records. Its single with the same name was a minor hit, peaking at No. 46 on the Adult Contemporary chart.

In 1993, Yost moved to Nashville and ventured into songwriting and producing aside from his performing duties. In the same year, Classics IV was inducted into the Georgia Music Hall of Fame.

In 2001, Yost underwent successful throat surgery for a condition that had severely impaired his singing voice, bringing him back to touring under the Classics IV name. A few years prior, he had regained the rights to the Classics IV name with the help of former Sha Na Na vocalist Jon "Bowser" Bauman through the group Truth in Music Advertising.

== Accident and death ==
On July 11, 2006, Yost fell down a flight of stairs and suffered serious brain trauma. To assist Yost and his wife with their medical bills, a benefit concert was held on March 25, 2007, at Rhino's Live in Cincinnati. The benefit was hosted by Jon Bauman. Many musical entertainers and some surprise guests from the 1950s through the 1970s performed some of their biggest chart-topping hits in tribute to Yost. Among the artists performing that day were Denny Laine of the Moody Blues and Wings, Chuck Negron of Three Dog Night, Ian Mitchell of Bay City Rollers, Pat Upton of Spiral Starecase, Dave Somerville, the Skyliners, Buzz Cason, Carl Dobkins Jr., Mark Volman of the Turtles, and The Robby Campbell Trio. The concert did not significantly benefit Yost or his wife financially as hoped. Expenses far exceeded the money raised, leaving the event in the red.

On December 7, 2008, coinciding with the 40th anniversary of the entrance of "Stormy" into the Hot 100's Top 10, Yost died from respiratory failure at the age of 65 at a hospital in Ohio at 2:25am. He was survived by his wife Linda V. Yost (Snyder), six children and six grandchildren.

== Discography ==
=== Albums ===
Year	Album
1980	Stormy
1981	Going Through the Motions
1983	Traces of the Past

=== Singles ===
Year	Title	Chart positions
Year	Title	US AC
1980	"Lover in My Mind"	-
1981	"Going Through the Motions"	46
