= List of performances and events at Woodstock Festival =

The Woodstock Music & Art Fair was a music festival held on a 600-acre (2.4-km^{2}) dairy farm in the rural town of Bethel, New York, from August 15 to August 18, 1969. Thirty-two acts performed during the sometimes rainy weekend in front of nearly half a million concertgoers. It is widely regarded as one of the greatest moments in popular music history and was listed on Rolling Stone's "50 Moments That Changed the History of Rock and Roll".

The musical artists who performed at Woodstock and the songs that they played are listed below.

== Friday, August 15 to Saturday, August 16 ==
The first day officially began at 5:07 p.m. with Richie Havens and featured folk artists.

=== Richie Havens ===
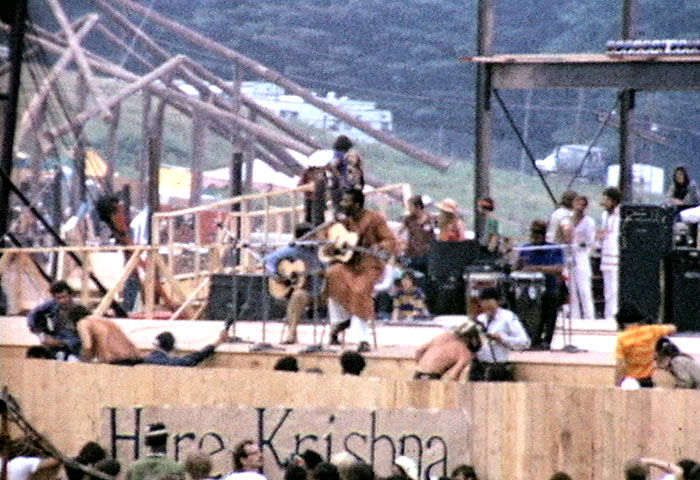
Richie Havens performing at Woodstock

- Richie Havens – guitar, vocals
- Paul "Deano" Williams – guitar, vocals
- Daniel Ben Zebulon – congas

5:07 p.m. – 5:30 p.m.

1. "From the Prison"
2. "Get Together"
3. "From the Prison" (reprise)
4. "I'm a Stranger Here"
5. "High Flying Bird"
6. "I Can't Make It Anymore"
7. "With a Little Help from My Friends" (Beatles cover)
8. "Handsome Johnny"
9. "Strawberry Fields Forever / Hey Jude" (Beatles covers)
10. "Freedom (Motherless Child)" (improvised lyrics)

=== Swami Satchidananda ===
6:00 p.m. – 6:15 p.m.

- Swami Satchidananda gave the invocation for the festival.

=== Sweetwater ===
- Nansi Nevins – vocals, guitar
- Fred Herrera – bass, vocals
- Alex Del Zoppo – keyboards, vocals
- Albert Moore – flute, vocals
- R.G. Carlyle – guitar, bongos, vocals
- Elpidio "Pete" Cobian – congas
- Alan Malarowitz – drums
- August Burns – cello

6:15 p.m. – 7:00 p.m.

1. "Sometimes I Feel Like a Motherless Child"
2. "Look Out"
3. "For Pete's Sake"
4. "Day Song"
5. "What's Wrong"
6. "My Crystal Spider"
7. "Two Worlds"
8. "Why Oh Why"
9. "Let the Sunshine In"
10. "Oh Happy Day"

=== Bert Sommer ===
- Bert Sommer – guitar, vocals
- Ira Stone – guitar, keyboards, harmonica
- Charlie Bilello – bass

7:15 p.m. – 7:45 p.m.

1. "Jennifer"
2. "The Road to Travel"
3. "I Wondered Where You'd Be"
4. "She's Gone"
5. "Things Are Goin' My Way"
6. "And When It's Over"
7. "Jeanette"
8. "America"
9. "A Note That Read"
10. "Smile"

=== Tim Hardin ===
- Tim Hardin – vocals, guitar
- Richard Bock – cello
- Ralph Towner – guitar, piano
- Bill Chelf - keyboard
- Gilles Malkine – guitar
- Glen Moore – bass
- Muruga Booker – drums

8:30 p.m. – 9:15 p.m. (time disputed)

1. "How Can We Hang On to a Dream?"
2. "Once-Touched by Flame"
3. "If I Were a Carpenter"
4. "Reason to Believe"
5. "You Upset the Grace of Living When You Lie"
6. "Speak Like a Child"
7. "Snow White Lady"
8. "Blues on My Ceiling"
9. "Simple Song of Freedom"
10. "Misty Roses"

=== Ravi Shankar ===
- Ravi Shankar – sitar
- Alla Rakha – tabla
- Maya Kulkarni – tambura

12:00 a.m. – 12:45 a.m. (His performance totaled over 42 minutes, partially during a rainstorm)

1. "Raga Puriya-Dhanashri/Gat In Sawarital"
2. "Tabla Solo In Jhaptal"
3. "Raga Manj Kmahaj (AIap, Jor, Dhun In Kaharwa Tal)"

=== Melanie ===
- Melanie Safka – guitar, vocals

1:00 a.m. – 1:30 a.m.

1. "Close to It All"
2. "Momma Momma"
3. "Beautiful People"
4. "Animal Crackers"
5. "Mr. Tambourine Man"
6. "Tuning My Guitar"
7. "Birthday of the Sun"

=== Arlo Guthrie ===
- Arlo Guthrie – vocals, guitar
- John Pilla – guitar
- Bob Arkin – bass
- Paul Motian – drums

1:45 a.m. – 2:15 a.m.

1. "Coming into Los Angeles"
2. "Wheel of Fortune"
3. "Walkin' Down the Line"
4. The Story of Moses
5. "Oh Mary Don't You Weep"
6. "Every Hand in the Land"
7. "Amazing Grace"

=== Joan Baez ===
- Joan Baez – vocals, guitar
- Jeffrey Shurtleff – guitar, vocals
- Richard Festinger – guitar

3:00 a.m. – 3:45 a.m. (Note: Joan Baez was six months pregnant at the time of the festival.)

1. "Oh Happy Day"
2. "The Last Thing on My Mind"
3. "I Shall Be Released"
4. Story about how federal marshals took husband David Harris into custody
5. "Joe Hill"
6. "Sweet Sir Galahad"
7. "Hickory Wind"
8. "Drug Store Truck Driving Man" (duet with Jeffrey Shurtleff)
9. "One Day at a Time"
10. "Take Me Back to the Sweet Sunny South"
11. "Warm and Tender Love"
12. "Swing Low, Sweet Chariot"
13. "We Shall Overcome"

== Saturday, August 16 to Sunday, August 17 ==
The day opened at 12:15 p.m. and featured some of the event's psychedelic and guitar rock headliners.

=== Quill ===
- Dan Cole – vocals
- Jon Cole – bass, vocals
- Norman Rogers – guitar, vocals
- Phil Thayer – keyboards, saxophone, flute
- Roger North – drums

12:15 p.m. – 1:00 p.m.

1. "They Live the Life"
2. "That's How I Eat"
3. "Driftin'"
4. "Waiting for You"

=== Country Joe McDonald ===
- Country Joe McDonald – guitar, vocals

1:20 p.m. – 1:30 p.m. (unscheduled performance; day/time disputed)

1. "Janis"
2. "Donovan's Reef"
3. "Heartaches by the Number"
4. "Ring of Fire"
5. "Tennessee Stud"
6. "Rockin' Round the World"
7. "Flyin' High"
8. "I Seen a Rocket"
9. "The "Fish" Cheer/I-Feel-Like-I'm-Fixin'-to-Die Rag"
10. "I-Feel-Like-I'm-Fixin'-to-Die Rag (Reprise)"

=== Santana ===
- Carlos Santana – guitar
- Gregg Rolie – vocals, keyboards
- David Brown – bass
- Michael Shrieve – drums
- Michael Carabello – timbales, congas, percussion
- José Areas – trumpet, timbales, congas, percussion

2:00 p.m. – 2:45 p.m.

1. "Waiting"
2. "Evil Ways"
3. "You Just Don't Care"
4. "Savor"
5. "Jingo"
6. "Persuasion"
7. "Soul Sacrifice"
8. "Fried Neckbones and Some Home Fries"

=== John Sebastian ===
- John Sebastian – guitar, vocals

3:30 p.m. – 3:55 p.m. (unscheduled performance; day/time disputed)

1. "How Have You Been"
2. "Rainbows All Over Your Blues"
3. "I Had a Dream"
4. "Darling Be Home Soon"
5. "Younger Generation"

=== Keef Hartley Band ===
- Keef Hartley – drums
- Miller Anderson – guitar, vocals
- Gary Thain – bass
- Jimmy Jewell – saxophone
- Henry Lowther – trumpet, violin

4:45 p.m. – 5:30 p.m.

1. "Spanish Fly"
2. "She's Gone"
3. "Too Much Thinking"
4. "Believe in You"
5. "Halfbreed Medley: Sinnin' for You / Leaving Trunk / Just to Cry / Sinnin' for You"

=== The Incredible String Band ===
- Mike Heron – vocals, guitar, piano, various instruments
- Robin Williamson – vocals, guitar, piano, violin
- Licorice McKechnie – organ, vocals
- Rose Simpson – bass, recorder, vocals, percussion

6:00 p.m. – 6:30 p.m.

1. "Invocation"
2. "The Letter"
3. "Gather 'Round"
4. "This Moment"
5. "Come with Me"
6. "When You Find Out Who You Are"

=== Canned Heat ===
- Alan "Blind Owl" Wilson – guitar, harmonica, vocals
- Bob "The Bear" Hite – vocals, harmonica
- Harvey "The Snake" Mandel – guitar
- Larry "The Mole" Taylor – bass
- Adolfo "Fito" de la Parra – drums

7:30 p.m. – 8:30 p.m.

1. "I'm Her Man"
2. "Going Up the Country"
3. "A Change Is Gonna Come / Leaving This Town"
4. "Rollin' Blues"
5. "Woodstock Boogie"
6. "On the Road Again"

=== Mountain ===
- Leslie West – guitar, vocals
- Felix Pappalardi – bass, vocals
- Steve Knight – keyboards
- N.D. Smart – drums

9:00 p.m. – 10:00 p.m.

1. "Blood of the Sun"
2. "Stormy Monday"
3. "Theme for an Imaginary Western"
4. "Long Red"
5. "For Yasgur's Farm" (song was untitled at the time)
6. "Beside the Sea"
7. "Waiting to Take You Away"
8. "Dreams of Milk and Honey / Guitar Solo"
9. "Southbound Train"

=== Grateful Dead ===
- Jerry Garcia – guitar, vocals
- Bob Weir – guitar, vocals
- Ron "Pigpen" McKernan – keyboards, harmonica, percussion, vocals
- Tom Constanten – keyboards
- Phil Lesh – bass, vocals
- Bill Kreutzmann – drums
- Mickey Hart – drums

10:30 p.m. – 12:05 a.m. (Note: The Grateful Dead set was cut short after the stage amps overloaded during "Turn On Your Love Light".)

1. "St. Stephen"
2. "Mama Tried"
3. "Dark Star"
4. "High Time"
5. "Turn On Your Love Light"

=== Creedence Clearwater Revival ===
- John Fogerty – vocals, guitar, harmonica, piano
- Tom Fogerty – guitar, vocals
- Stu Cook – bass
- Doug Clifford – drums

12:30 a.m. – 1:20 a.m.

1. "Born on the Bayou"
2. "Green River"
3. "Ninety-Nine and a Half (Won't Do)"
4. "Bootleg"
5. "Commotion"
6. "Bad Moon Rising"
7. "Proud Mary"
8. "I Put a Spell on You"
9. "Night Time Is the Right Time"
10. "Keep on Chooglin'"
11. "Susie Q"

=== Janis Joplin and the Kozmic Blues Band ===
- Janis Joplin – vocals
- John Till – guitar
- Richard Kermode – keyboards
- Brad Campbell – bass
- Maury Baker – drums
- Terry Clements – tenor saxophone
- Cornelius "Snooky" Flowers – baritone saxophone, vocals
- Luis Gasca – trumpet

2:00 a.m. – 3:00 a.m.

1. "Raise Your Hand"
2. "As Good as You've Been to This World"
3. "To Love Somebody"
4. "Summertime"
5. "Try (Just a Little Bit Harder)"
6. "Kozmic Blues"
7. "I Can't Turn You Loose"
8. "Work Me, Lord"
9. "Piece of My Heart"
10. "Ball and Chain"

=== Sly & the Family Stone ===
- Sly Stone – keyboards, vocals
- Freddie Stone – guitar, vocals
- Jerry Martini – saxophone
- Cynthia Robinson – trumpet
- Rose Stone – keyboards, vocals
- Larry Graham – bass, vocals
- Gregg Errico – drums

3:30 a.m. – 4:20 a.m.

1. "M'Lady"
2. "Sing a Simple Song"
3. "You Can Make It If You Try"
4. "Everyday People" (Only No. 1 hit at Woodstock in the U.S.; "With A Little Help From My Friends" was No. 1 in the UK)
5. "Dance to the Music"
6. "Music Lover"
7. "I Want to Take You Higher"
8. "Love City"
9. "Stand!"

=== The Who ===
- Roger Daltrey – vocals
- Pete Townshend – guitar, vocals
- John Entwistle – bass, vocals
- Keith Moon – drums

5:00 a.m. – 6:05 a.m.; set included most of Tommy

1. "Heaven and Hell"
2. "I Can't Explain"
3. "It's a Boy"
4. "1921"
5. "Amazing Journey"
6. "Sparks"
7. "Eyesight to the Blind (The Hawker)"
8. "Christmas"
9. "The Acid Queen"
10. "Pinball Wizard" (followed by Abbie Hoffman incident)
11. "Do You Think It's Alright?"
12. "Fiddle About"
13. "There's a Doctor"
14. "Go to the Mirror!"
15. "Smash the Mirror"
16. "I'm Free"
17. "Tommy's Holiday Camp"
18. "We're Not Gonna Take It"
19. "See Me, Feel Me"
20. "Summertime Blues"
21. "Shakin' All Over"
22. "My Generation" (shortened version)
23. "Naked Eye" (instrumental finale only)

=== Jefferson Airplane ===
- Grace Slick – vocals
- Marty Balin – vocals, percussion
- Paul Kantner – guitar, vocals
- Jorma Kaukonen – guitar, vocals
- Jack Casady – bass
- Spencer Dryden – drums
- Nicky Hopkins – piano

8:00 a.m. – 9:40 a.m.

1. "The Other Side of This Life"
2. "Somebody to Love"
3. "3/5 of a Mile in 10 Seconds"
4. "Won't You Try/Saturday Afternoon"
5. "Eskimo Blue Day"
6. "Plastic Fantastic Lover"
7. "Wooden Ships"
8. "Uncle Sam Blues"
9. "Volunteers"
10. "The Ballad of You and Me and Pooneil"
11. "Come Back Baby"
12. "White Rabbit"
13. "The House at Pooneil Corners"

== Sunday, August 17 to Monday, August 18 ==
The third day was dominated by blues rock and roots rock.

=== Joe Cocker and the Grease Band ===
- Joe Cocker – vocals
- Chris Stainton – keyboards
- Henry McCullough – guitar, vocals
- Alan Spenner – bass, vocals
- Bruce Rowland – drums

2:00 p.m. – 3:25 p.m.

1. "Rockhouse" (instrumental; without Cocker)
2. "Who Knows What Tomorrow May Bring" (instrumental; without Cocker)
3. "Dear Landlord"
4. "Something's Coming On"
5. "Do I Still Figure in Your Life?"
6. "Feelin' Alright"
7. "Just Like a Woman"
8. "Let's Go Get Stoned"
9. "I Don't Need No Doctor"
10. "I Shall Be Released"
11. "Hitchcock Railway"
12. "Something to Say"
13. "With a Little Help from My Friends" (Beatles cover) (No. 1 in the UK)

After Cocker's set, a thunderstorm disrupted the events for a few hours.

=== Country Joe and the Fish ===
- Country Joe McDonald – vocals, guitar
- Barry "The Fish" Melton – guitar, vocals
- Mark Kapner – keyboards
- Doug Metzner – bass
- Greg Dewey – drums

6:30 p.m. – 8:00 p.m.

1. "Rock & Soul Music"
2. "Love"
3. "Not So Sweet Martha Lorraine"
4. "Sing, Sing, Sing"
5. "Summer Dresses"
6. "Friend, Lover, Woman, Wife"
7. "Silver and Gold"
8. "Maria"
9. "The Love Machine"
10. "Ever Since You Told Me That You Love Me (I'm a Nut)"
11. "Crystal Blues"
12. "Rock & Soul Music (Reprise)"
13. "The "Fish" Cheer/I-Feel-Like-I'm-Fixin'-to-Die Rag"

=== Ten Years After ===
- Alvin Lee – guitar, vocals
- Chick Churchill – keyboards
- Leo Lyons – bass
- Ric Lee – drums

8:15 p.m. – 9:15 p.m.

1. "Spoonful"
2. "Good Morning, Little Schoolgirl" (with two false starts)
3. "Hobbit"
4. "I Can't Keep from Crying Sometimes"
5. "Help Me"
6. "I'm Going Home"

=== The Band ===
- Robbie Robertson – guitar, vocals
- Richard Manuel – piano, wurlitzer, vocals, drums (On "Ain't No More Cane" and "Don't Ya Tell Henry")
- Garth Hudson – organ, clavinet, piano
- Rick Danko – bass, vocals
- Levon Helm – drums, mandolin (On "Ain't No More Cane" and "Don't Ya Tell Henry"), vocals

10:00 p.m. – 10:50 p.m.

1. "Chest Fever"
2. "Don't Do It" (Written by Holland–Dozier–Holland)
3. "Tears of Rage" (Written by Manuel and Dylan)
4. "We Can Talk"
5. "Long Black Veil" (Written by Dill and Wilkin)
6. "Don't Ya Tell Henry" (Written by Dylan)
7. "Ain't No More Cane" (Traditional)
8. "This Wheel's on Fire" (Written by Danko and Dylan)
9. "I Shall Be Released" (Written by Manuel and Dylan)
10. "The Weight"
11. "Loving You Is Sweeter Than Ever" (Written by Hunter and Wonder)

Robertson and Helm both recall in their respective books Testimony and This Wheel's On Fire: Levon Helm and the Story of The Band immense dissatisfaction in their participation in the festival. They were not upset by their performances themselves, but rather upset with the behaviors of the audience and the environment. Woodstock had been the residence of both Bob Dylan and The Band for years until that point, therefore The Band was unhappy with how the festival would come to shape the legacy and reputation of the small town of Woodstock. Robertson would state later in his book Testimony that "The Band's participation sent the wrong message..."

=== Johnny Winter ===
- Johnny Winter – guitar, vocals
- Tommy Shannon – bass
- Uncle John Turner – drums
- Edgar Winter – keyboards, saxophone, vocals

12:00 a.m. – 1:05 a.m.;

1. "Mama, Talk to Your Daughter"
2. "Leland Mississippi Blues"
3. "Mean Town Blues"
4. "You Done Lost Your Good Thing Now" / "Mean Mistreater"
5. "I Can't Stand It" (with Edgar Winter)
6. "Tobacco Road" (with Edgar Winter)
7. "Tell the Truth" (with Edgar Winter)
8. "Johnny B. Goode"

=== Blood, Sweat & Tears ===
- David Clayton-Thomas – vocals, guitar
- Steve Katz – guitar, harmonica, vocals
- Dick Halligan – keyboards, trombone, flute
- Jerry Hyman – trombone
- Fred Lipsius – alto sax, piano
- Lew Soloff – trumpet, flugelhorn
- Chuck Winfield – trumpet, flugelhorn
- Jim Fielder – bass
- Bobby Colomby – drums

1:30 a.m. – 2:30 a.m.

1. "More and More"
2. "Just One Smile"
3. "Somethin' Comin' On"
4. "I Love You More Than You'll Ever Know"
5. "Spinning Wheel"
6. "Sometimes in Winter"
7. "Smiling Phases"
8. "God Bless the Child"
9. "And When I Die"
10. "You've Made Me So Very Happy"

Both Blood, Sweat & Tears and The Band declined to participate in the 1970 documentary film or its soundtrack album because they were unhappy with the sound quality of their performance. Film cameras were also ordered to stop filming them, as both of their managers had never given permission for either band to be filmed. Both performances would not be officially released in full until 2019.

=== Crosby, Stills, Nash & Young ===
- David Crosby – guitar, vocals
- Stephen Stills – guitar, vocals
- Graham Nash – guitar, vocals
- Neil Young – guitar, keyboards, vocals
- Greg Reeves – bass
- Dallas Taylor – drums

3:00 a.m. – 4:00 a.m., with separate acoustic and electric sets.

- Acoustic set
1. "Suite: Judy Blue Eyes"
2. "Blackbird" (The Beatles cover)
3. "Helplessly Hoping"
4. "Guinnevere"
5. "Marrakesh Express"
6. "4 + 20"
7. "Mr. Soul"
8. "Wonderin’"
9. "You Don't Have to Cry"
- Electric set
1. "Pre-Road Downs"
2. "Long Time Gone"
3. "Bluebird Revisited"
4. "Sea of Madness"
5. "Wooden Ships"
- Acoustic encore
1. "Find the Cost of Freedom"
- Electric encore
1. "49 Bye-Byes"

This was just the band's second performance together. Neil Young skipped most of the acoustic set (the exceptions being his compositions "Mr. Soul" and "Wonderin'" and the final acoustic song, Stills' "You Don't Have to Cry") and joined Crosby, Stills and Nash during the electric set, but refused to be filmed. Young felt the filming was distracting both performers and audience from the music. As a result, Young's name was dropped in the concert film and on its soundtrack (though his name is included in Chip Monck's introduction of the band in the film). Despite Young's refusal, footage does exist of him performing "Mr. Soul" and "Long Time Gone". The "Mr. Soul" performance can be found as an Easter egg on his The Archives Vol. 1 1963–1972 box set, but because of Young's resistance to being filmed, during much of the performance the camera remains focused on Stills. The version of Young's "Sea of Madness" on the Woodstock soundtrack album was actually recorded at a Fillmore East concert, one month after the festival. According to legend, Stephen Stills demanded the replacement because the Woodstock version was substandard. The original recording finally saw release on 2019's Woodstock – Back to the Garden: The Definitive 50th Anniversary Archive.

=== Paul Butterfield Blues Band ===
- Paul Butterfield – vocals, harmonica
- Buzz Feiten – guitar
- Rod Hicks – bass
- Phillip Wilson – drums
- David Sanborn – alto saxophone
- Gene Dinwiddie – tenor saxophone, vocals
- Trevor Lawrence – baritone saxophone
- Keith Johnson – trumpet
- Steve Madaio – trumpet

6:00 a.m. – 6:45 a.m.

1. "Born Under a Bad Sign"
2. "No Amount of Loving"
3. "Driftin' and Driftin'"
4. "Morning Sunrise"
5. "All in a Day"
6. "Love March"
7. "Everything's Gonna Be Alright"

This set was released on an album titled Paul Butterfield Live In White Lake, N.Y. 8/18/69.

=== Sha Na Na ===
- Donny York – vocals
- Rob Leonard – vocals
- Alan Cooper – vocals
- Frederick "Dennis" Greene – vocals
- Dave Garrett – vocals
- Rich Joffe – vocals
- Scott Powell – vocals
- Joe Witkin – keyboards
- Henry Gross – guitar
- Elliot "Gino" Cahn – guitar
- Bruce "Bruno" Clarke – bass
- Jocko Marcellino – drums

7:30 a.m. – 8:00 a.m.

1. "Get a Job"
2. "Come Go with Me"
3. "Silhouettes"
4. "Teen Angel"
5. "(Marie's the Name) His Latest Flame"
6. "Wipe Out"
7. "Book of Love"
8. "Teenager in Love" (The sole song from the festival for which no recording has yet surfaced.)
9. "Little Darlin'" (Only a recording of the last 44 seconds is currently known to exist.)
10. "At the Hop"
11. "Duke of Earl"
12. "Get a Job (Reprise)"

=== Jimi Hendrix ===
- Jimi Hendrix – guitar, vocals
- Larry Lee – guitar, vocals
- Billy Cox – bass, vocals
- Mitch Mitchell – drums
- Juma Sultan – percussion
- Gerardo Velez – congas

9:00 a.m. – 11:10 a.m.

1. "Message to Love"
2. "Hear My Train A Comin'"
3. "Spanish Castle Magic"
4. "Red House" (Hendrix's high E-string broke while playing, but he played the rest of the song with five strings.)
5. "Mastermind" (written and sung by Larry Lee. The recording has never been officially released as the Hendrix estate has prohibited it for "aesthetic reasons").
6. "Lover Man"
7. "Foxy Lady"
8. "Jam Back at the House"
9. "Izabella"
10. "Gypsy Woman"/"Aware of Love" (These two songs written by Curtis Mayfield were sung by Larry Lee as a medley. The recording has never been officially released as the Hendrix estate has prohibited it for "aesthetic reasons".)
11. "Fire"
12. "Voodoo Child (Slight Return)"/"Stepping Stone"
13. "The Star-Spangled Banner"
14. "Purple Haze"
15. "Woodstock Improvisation" (title is posthumous)
16. "Villanova Junction" (title is posthumous)
17. "Hey Joe" (encore)

After being introduced as the Jimi Hendrix Experience, Hendrix corrected his temporary group's name to "Gypsy Sun and Rainbows, for short it's nothin' but a band of gypsies." Later during the set he introduced them as "Sky Church". The band performed with Hendrix just twice after Woodstock.
