= What Am I Crying For =

What Am I Crying For may refer to:

- "What Am I Crying For" (song), a 1972 single by Dennis Yost and the Classics IV
- What Am I Crying For (album), a 1973 album by Dennis Yost and the Classics IV
