= Vincent Taylor =

Vincent Taylor may refer to:

- Vincent A. Taylor (1845–1922), U.S. Representative from Ohio
- Vincent Taylor (musician), American guitar player with Sha Na Na
- Vince Taylor (1939–1991), British singer
- Vincent Taylor (theologian) (1887–1968), Methodist biblical scholar and theologian
- Vince Taylor (bodybuilder) (born 1956), American bodybuilder
- Vincent Taylor (American football), American football player
