= Noella Marcellino =

American Benedictine nun, scientist

Mother Noella Marcellino
- Born: Martha A. Marcellino; June 30, 1951 (age 75)
- Citizenship: American
- Education: University of Connecticut
- Known for: Microbiology
- Awards: Fulbright Scholarship; French Fellowship; French Food Spirit Award
- Scientific career
- Fields: Microbiology; Molecular biology Cellular biology
- Workplaces: Abbey of Regina Laudis

Mother Noella Marcellino, O.S.B., (born Martha A. Marcellino; June 30, 1951) is an American Benedictine nun who has earned a doctorate in microbiology from the University of Connecticut. Studying fungi in France on a Fulbright Scholarship, she concentrated on the positive effects of decay and putrefaction as well as the odors and flavors of cheese.

== Biography ==
Marcellino dropped out of Sarah Lawrence College. The Archbishop of Hartford, John Whealon, gave permission for members of the cloistered community of Benedictine nuns of Abbey of Regina Laudis to embark on a pilgrimage for higher education. In December 1986, Marcellino and three other nuns applied and were accepted into courses for Agricultural Science at the University of Connecticut.

In 1987 the group began a program in scholarship that resulted in all receiving doctoral degrees; Marcellino's was in molecular and cell biology/microbiology. She began with introductory sciences courses at The University of Connecticut's campus in Waterbury, but it was during a visit by UCONN organic chemistry professor Nina Stein to the abbey's cheese cellar, that the professor suggested that she focus her research on the microbiology of cheese ripening.

She won a Fulbright scholarship to France to collect and examine native strains of fungi, with an emphasis on Geotrichum candidum, from traditional cheese caves and stayed an additional three years, analyzing the samples on a grant from the French government.

Mother Noella used to not be able to eat cheese, except for the occasional chunk of smoked cheddar, and had been making cheese in a wooden whiskey barrel since 1977.

She is a member of the Abbey of Regina Laudis. She now frequently advises the United States cheese industry and she is a speaker and judge at competitions.

Her brother is John "Jocko" Marcellino, founding member and drummer with Sha Na Na.

== Praise ==
She was praised by Rémy Grappin, the late Director of Research at France's National Institute of Agricultural Research, who said that she had studied the biodiversity of raw-milk cheese fungi and no one else was fighting harder to preserve it in a world of standardization and pasteurization. She was named the official cheese maker of Abbey of Regina Laudis and she is part of an ancient order of cheese makers. She won a French Food Spirit Award and the organizers for the award said that she was an international expert on cheese.

== Documentary ==
Marcellino was the subject of a PBS documentary called The Cheese Nun, but she said that she does not like being called a cheese nun. She was filmed while she traveled though the French countryside collecting information from cheese-making experts. Mother Dolores Hart advised her to go with "The Cheese Nun", because cheese is more appealing than fungi. She was also featured in the Netflix limited Series "Cooked". She appeared on the episode "Earth".

== See also ==
- List of cheesemakers

== Additional sources ==
- Microbe, "Microbiological Research Adds a Scientific Element to Cheesemaking"
- Seattle Post-Intelligencer, "Cheese fest is habit-forming"
- Holy Trinity Apostolate, "Lenten Symposium 2009"
- New Worlder, "Mother Noella & The Ecosystems of Cheese"
