= Sea of Madness =

Sea of Madness may refer to:

- "Sea of Madness", a song by Crosby, Stills, Nash and Young: see List of performances and events at Woodstock Festival#Crosby, Stills, Nash & Young
- "Sea of Madness", a song by Iron Maiden from Somewhere in Time
