= Whitman-Hanson Regional High School =

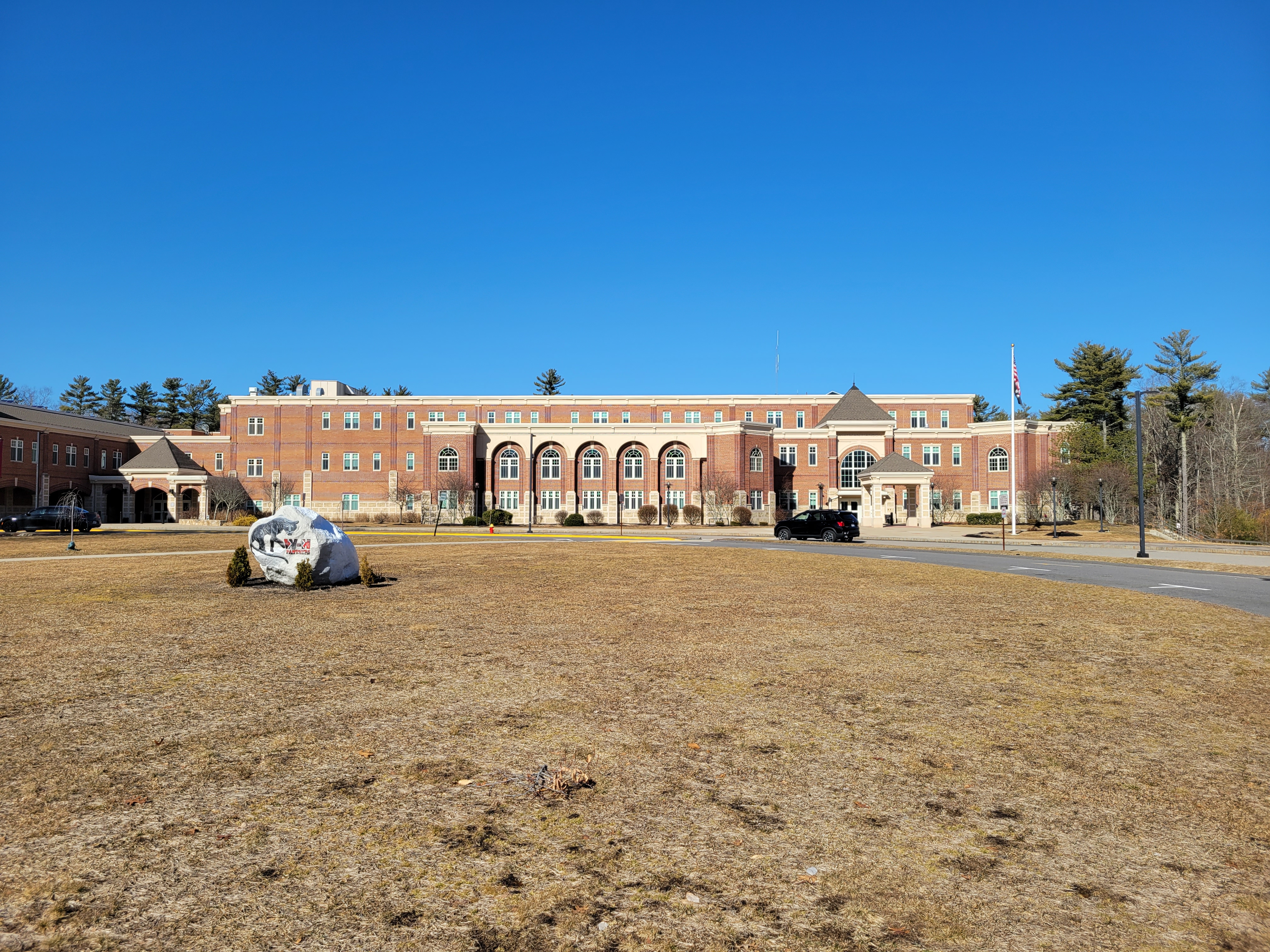

Location
- 600 Franklin St. Hanson, Massachusetts 02341; United States; 42°04′10″N 70°54′28″W

Information
- Type: Public; Open enrollment
- Established: 1800S
- Principal: Christopher Jones
- Grades: 9–12
- Enrollment: 1,170 (2016–17)
- Campus: Suburban
- Colors: Black & Red
- Mascot: Panthers
- Rival: Abington High School
- Newspaper: The Main Street Journal
- Yearbook: Retrospect
- Communities served: Whitman, Hanson
- Website: https://whs.whrsd.org/

Whitman-Hanson Regional High School is a public high school located in Hanson, Massachusetts, United States. The school serves students in grades 9-12 from the towns of Whitman, Massachusetts and Hanson, Massachusetts. It is part of the Whitman-Hanson Regional School District. The schools colors are Black & Red and the mascot is the Panther.

Until 1960, the school was called Whitman High School and was then located in an older building across from the Whitman Town Park and the Colebrook Cemetery in Whitman. Both Whitman and Hanson students used the school, although at an even earlier time, the school had also housed students from other towns, including Halifax, Massachusetts.

The old Whitman High School had become so crowded by the 1959-1960 academic year, classes were attended in split day schedules with the Freshman class attending in the afternoon. The new building was called Whitman-Hanson Regional High School and was open for classes and occupied in September 1960. It was located on Franklin Street at the town line of Whitman and Hanson, at a site in front of the current Whitman-Hanson Regional High School, built in 2005. (The building is now hidden from sight from Franklin Street).

== Notable alumni ==
- Lennie Baker (1946–2016) – singer and saxophone player for the group Sha Na Na
- Nick Cafardo (1956–2019) – sportswriter for The Boston Globe
- Sean Conover (born 1984) – former defensive end for the St. Louis Rams of the National Football League
- Alex Karalexis (born 1977) – professional fighter and cast member on Season 1 of The Ultimate Fighter
- Dana LeVangie (born 1969) – Former pitching coach for the Boston Red Sox
- Joe List (born 1982) – stand-up comedian
- James Lowder (born 1963) – best-selling dark fantasy and horror author and award-winning editor
- Kristen Merlin (born 1984) – singer/songwriter/artist who was a contestant on The Voice
- Kristie Mewis (born 1991) – professional soccer player and member of the United States women's national soccer team
- Sam Mewis (born 1992) – professional soccer player and member of the United States women's national soccer team
- Maura Murray (born 1982) – University of Massachusetts nursing student whose 2004 disappearance has been extensively explored in the media; set distance-running records at W-H and captained the cross-country team
- Steve Smith (born 1954) – former drummer of the rock band Journey
- Francis Spellman (1889–1967) – Cardinal Archbishop of New York (1939–1967)

== Notable faculty ==
- Carl Etelman (1900–1963), was a football back and coach of the high school team for 18 years
