= Elmer Edward Solly =

American murderer

- Born: September 5, 1945
- Died: November 30, 2007 (aged 62); Gloucester City, New Jersey
- Other name: Daniel "Danny C" Catalano
- Criminal charges: Manslaughter
- Time at large: 27 years
- Escaped: June 1974
- Escape end: May 10, 2001

Elmer Edward Solly (September 5, 1945 – November 30, 2007) was convicted of manslaughter in 1970 for the death of two-year-old Christopher Welsh. Solly escaped from custody in 1974 and spent the next 27 years living under numerous pseudonyms. At the time of his arrest in May 2001, he was living in Florida as Daniel "Danny C" Catalano, a supposed former member of the American rock 'n' roll group Sha Na Na; in fact, he never had any ties to Sha Na Na.

== Manslaughter conviction and escape ==
On the evening of July 25, 1969, Solly, in a drunken rage, severely beat his girlfriend's two-year-old son, Christopher Welsh, who died of his injuries. Solly turned himself in to local police a few days later. He was convicted of manslaughter on April 16, 1970, and incarcerated at Trenton State Prison. While Solly was in Trenton State Prison, his mother and grandmother began a letter-writing campaign alleging mistreatment on the part of prison guards.

As a result of the campaign, Solly was transferred to medium-security Leesburg State Prison in 1974. There, he befriended a prison psychologist, who convinced officials to allow Solly to visit his mother. During the third visit, in June 1974, Solly was accompanied only by the psychologist. Solly asked to be allowed to visit his girlfriend, and he used the opportunity to escape. His escape was not reported to police for six hours, giving Solly sufficient time to disappear.

== As a fugitive ==
Immediately after his escape, Solly began using a series of assumed identities to evade capture. In 1975, he was arrested in Philadelphia for receiving stolen goods, but because he used a fake name, police did not realize who he was. Similarly, he provided a fake name when he was stopped for a traffic violation in 1979 and avoided detainment. Detectives had few leads in the case, and received no cooperation from Solly's family, particularly his mother, Edna Bolt, who consistently denied knowing her son's whereabouts. Eventually, Solly's escape was considered a cold case.

Solly eventually made his way to Florida, where he assumed the identity of Vinnie Taylor, lead guitarist of the rock 'n' roll revival group Sha Na Na. The real Taylor died of a heroin overdose in 1974, but using forged documents, including a Social Security card, a birth certificate, and a baptism certificate, Solly successfully passed himself off as Taylor. Solly, posing as Taylor, claimed that Taylor's death had been staged and so he took on the new stage name of Daniel "Danny C" Catalano, and began performing and recording under that name. Sha Na Na discovered the fraud and demanded that Solly cease performing as Danny C. When Solly refused, the group considered filing a lawsuit, but decided not to do so in order to deny Solly the free publicity the case would generate.

== Investigation and capture ==
In 1999, New Jersey State Police, Louis Kinkle, and Cumberland County Sheriff's Office investigators reopened the Solly case. They enlisted the aid of forensic artist Frank Bender, who used 25-year-old photographs of Solly to create an image of what he would look like currently. In March 2000, Edna Bolt died, after which other members of Solly's family began cooperating with investigators. Bolt's husband Harry told police that Solly was living in Florida as a singer using the name Danny C. A web search revealed a website for Danny C, billing himself as the "Bad Boy" of Sha Na Na. The site featured a picture of Danny C that closely resembled the image produced by Bender.

Based on this information, authorities traveled first to Orlando and then to St. Pete Beach. They discovered Solly fishing on a pier near his apartment complex. U.S. Marshals arrested Solly on May 10, 2001, and he was returned to New Jersey on May 18. He was convicted on October 5 for his 1974 escape and was incarcerated at Riverfront State Prison in Camden to serve that sentence and the remainder of his manslaughter sentence. Solly was granted parole in August 2003 for good behavior and time served. He was last reported to be living in a welfare motel in New Jersey. Solly died on November 30, 2007, in Gloucester City, New Jersey.
