= The Rockin' Ramrods =

American garage rock band

The Rockin’ Ramrods

Background information
- Origin: Boston, Massachusetts, United States
- Genres: Garage rock; rock and roll; surf; protopunk
- Years active: 1963-1971
- Labels: Explosive, Bon-Bon, Plymouth, Southern Sound, Claridge
- Past members: Vin Campisi; Bill Linnane; Ronn Campisi; Bob Henderson; Scott Curtis; Lenny Cirelli; Bob Blake; Jim Mandell; David Ryan

The Rockin’ Ramrods were an American garage rock band from Boston, Massachusetts, who were active in the 1960s and early 1970s. Along with the Barbarians, the Remains and the Lost, they were one of the most popular acts in the Boston area. While they did not achieve national success, their work is today well-regarded by garage rock collectors and enthusiasts. They are perhaps best remembered for the 1964 protopunk anthem "She Lied." Though best known as the Rockin’ Ramrods, they recorded under other names. They recorded one single as the GTO's.

== History ==
The group was founded in 1962 as the Ramrods Four by Boston residents Bill Linnane and Vin Campisi. They began as a surf rock unit who played primarily instrumentals, eventually modifying their name to the Rockin' Ramrods. Their original lineup consisted of Bill Linnane guitar and keyboards, Vin Campisi on guitar, Bob Blake on bass, and Butch Holmes on drums, but in 1963 Vin Campisi's brother Ronn replaced Blake on bass and Bob Henderson became the group's drummer. Both Ronn Campisi and Henderson would become important fixtures in the group over the next several years. The Rockin' Ramrods released their first single "Jungle Call" b/w "Indian Giver" on Explosive Records in late 1963.

In 1964 as instrumental groups lost favor after the onset of the Beatles and the British Invasion, the Rockin' Ramrods switched to the practice of using vocals in most of their songs. Guitarist Ronn Campisi began to handle most of the band's lead vocals, although other group members, such as drummer Bob Henderson, would also sing leads and backups. In April of that year, the band cut a single featuring the grinding protopunk of "She Lied," written by Bill Linnane and Ronn Campisi, for Bon-Bon Records, backed with "The Girl Can’t Help It." Guitarist and keyboardist Linnane was largely responsible for the group's hard-driving early sound,

In the Fall of 1965, they opened for the Rolling Stones, along with the Blue Belles Vibrations. In December 1964 the Rockin' Ramrods had cut a version of "I Wanna Be Your Man" that John Lennon and Paul McCartney had written for the Rolling Stones' first single in 1963 and which the Beatles later recorded for their second album in England, With the Beatles. On the flipside was an obscure Lennon/McCartney number, "I'll Be on My Way." In 1965 the band released their next 45, "Wild About You" b/w "Cry in my Room" on the Southern Sound label, followed by a record they released under another name, the GTO's, "Don't Fool With Fu Manchu" b/w "Tears in the Stones" for the Claridge label. The band made an appearance in the movie Disk-o-Tek Holiday, filmed in 1965 while Scott Curtis was their keyboardist. At the end of the year, Scott Curtis departed and was replaced by Lenny Cirelli.

Several anthologies have been released featuring the band's collected work. The French label Eva Records issued the LP compilation I Wanna Be Your Man in 1983. Big Beat Records released The Best Of The Rockin' Ramrods in 1995. In 2000, Akarma Records, out of Italy, issued their own compilation of the same name, The Best Of The Rockin' Ramrods.

== Personnel ==
=== Circa 1963 ===
- Bill Linnane (guitar and keyboards)
- Vin Campisi (guitar)
- Bob Blake (bass)
- Butch Holmes (drums)

=== Circa. 1964 ===
- Bill Linnane (guitar, keyboards, and vocals)
- Vin Campisi (guitar and vocals)
- Ron Campisi (bass and vocals)
- Bob Henderson (drums and vocals)

=== Circa. 1965 ===
- Bill Linnane (guitar, keyboards, and vocals)
- Scott Curtis (organ and vocals) replacing Linnane
- Vin Campisi (guitar and vocals)
- Ron Campisi (bass and vocals)
- Bob Henderson (drums and vocals)

=== Circa. 1966-1967 ===
- Vinn Campisi (guitar and vocals)
- Ron Campisi (bass and vocals)
- Lenny Cirelli (organ)
- Bob Henderson (drums and vocals)

=== Circa. 1968 ===
- Vin Campisi (guitar and vocals)
- Ronn Campisi (bass and vocals)
- Lenny Cirelli(organ)
- Bob Henderson (drums and vocals)
- David Allen Ryan, after Ronn left the group (bass and most lead vocals)
- Jim Mandell came in to replace Len Cirelli (vocals and keyboard)

== Discography ==
=== Singles (as the Rockin' Ramrods) ===
- "Jungle Call" b/w "Indian Giver" (Explosive #F-102, 1963)
- "She Lied" b/w "The Girl Can’t Help It" (Bon-Bon 1315, April 1964)
- "I Wanna Be Your Man" b/w "I’ll Be on My Way" (Plymouth 2961/2962, December 1964)
- "Wild About You" b/w "Cry in My Room" (Southern Sound 205, July 1965)
- "Don’t Fool with Fu Manchu" b/w "Tears Melt the Stones" (as the GTO's) (Claridge 301, November 1965)
- "Play It" b/w "Got My Mojo Workin'" (Claridge 317, April 1966)
- "Bright Lit, Blues Skies" b/w "Mister Wind" (Plymouth 2964, July 1966)
- "Flowers in My Mind" b/w "Mary, Mary" (Plymouth 2965, 1967)
