= Ed Goodgold =

American music industry executive (died 2021)

- Education: Columbia University (BA)
- Occupations: Academic administrator, music executive
- Employer: New York University
- Known for: Manager of Sha Na Na; Coining the term "trivia"

Edwin "Ed" Goodgold (died May 7, 2021) was an American writer, music industry executive, academic administrator. He is known for coining the term "trivia" in 1965. He was also the first manager of Sha Na Na.

== Biography ==
Goodgold was born in Israel and grew up in Brooklyn. He attended Samuel J. Tilden High School and graduated from Columbia College in 1965. Goodgold was a history major at Columbia and was features editor of the Columbia Daily Spectator, where he introduced the term "trivia" in a February 25, 1965 article, saying that “Trivia is a game played by countless young adults, who on the one hand realize they have misspent their youth and yet, on the other hand, do not want to let go of it." In trivia, "participants try to stump their opponents with the most minute details of shared childhood experiences," he wrote.

At Columbia, Goodgold held Q&A sessions in dorm lounges with his classmates, trading questions about popular culture of their youth, and, with classmate Dan Carlinsky, hosted late-night call-in trivia shows on WKCR-FM. He and Carlinsky also produced the nation's first trivia contest at Columbia on March 1, 1965, and, later, the first intercollegiate Quiz bowls, open to the Ivy League and the Seven Sisters colleges, in October 1965 and February 1967. Goodgold and Carlinsky co-wrote the 1966 book,Trivia, introducing the subject to a national audience.

After college, Goodgold studied at the New York University School of Law and was manager for the rock-and-roll group Sha Na Na. He then served as Americas manager for the English rock band Genesis.

In 1992, Goodgold retired from his music industry career and took up an administrative position in the Steinhardt School of Culture, Education, and Human Development at New York University as assistant to the associate dean.

Goodgold died on May 7, 2021, in New York City.
