= Truth in Music Advertising =

The Truth in Music Advertising act or bill, also known as Truth in Music Performance Advertising or simply Truth in Music, is legislation, adopted into state law by most U.S. states, that aims to protect the trademark of musical recording artists. The legislation provides that the name of a famous musical group cannot be used by a group of performers unless they include at least one member of the original group. The intent of the legislation is to prevent unfair or deceptive trade practices, and to protect the livelihood of musicians who were in famous musical groups.

The legislation, co-authored by former Sha Na Na member Jon "Bowzer" Bauman and promoted by him and Mary Wilson of the Supremes, was not passed by the U.S. Congress, but has been enacted in 35 of the 50 states. The legislation has been tested in the U.S. Court of Appeals for the Third Circuit.

== Background ==
From 1977 to 1981, Jon "Bowzer" Bauman hosted other musicians on his television show Sha Na Na. He talked with Carl Gardner of the Coasters and Charlie Thomas of the Drifters, discovering in the process that they were being victimized by "knock-off" groups of performers using the name of a famous group without having a member of that group. Ben E. King said he, Thomas and Bill Pinkney were losing out on potential gigs and income because there were "so many fake Drifters performing". Herb Reed of the Platters told Bauman that his group had experienced "about 30" court cases fighting against fake groups. Researching the laws, Bauman found that the original musicians had scant legal protection against their group name being used by promoters or other performers, so he determined to amend the existing laws to increase protection for the original musicians. He allied with the Vocal Group Hall of Fame (VGHF) to bring famous musicians together to help promote these new laws. VGHF President Bob Crosby said of the fake groups "It's a form of identity theft to the artists... Most importantly it is misleading the public for them to think they are seeing the artist who made the hits when they are not." Mary Wilson of the Supremes joined the effort, appearing with Bauman before the US Congress in March 1999. She said "We want these fake groups to say they are tribute groups or get their own name."

== Lawsuits ==
The Drifters formed in 1953 with singer Clyde McPhatter and manager George Treadwell sharing the name equally. McPhatter sold his half to Treadwell in 1954, giving Treadwell full control of the Drifters' name, an action that he later regretted, because it caused financial problems for his fellow musicians. Treadwell died in 1967, leaving his widow, Faye Treadwell, as manager of the group. In 1969, the founder and editor of Rock Magazine, Larry Marshak, planned a series of concerts to be performed by classic vocal groups including the Drifters. Former Drifter Ben E. King responded that he would not perform, but he referred Marshak to Charlie Thomas, Elsbeary Hobbs and Doc Green, who agreed. Thomas, Hobbs and Green continued to perform as the Drifters under Marshak's management through the 1970s. However, starting in 1972, Faye Treadwell revived the Drifters in the UK. Faye Treadwell and Marshak sued each other several times over the rights to the group name, with Treadwell winning the rights to the Drifters name in July 1999, Judge Nicholas H. Politan presiding in the case Marshak v. Treadwell, et al.

Marshak appealed the decision to the Third Circuit. Federal Judges Samuel Alito, Maryanne Trump Barry and Ruggero J. Aldisert determined in February 2001 that Marshak's 1978 trademark registration for the Drifters name must be canceled as invalid, and that Marshak must stop using the Drifters' name in business. Marshak was ordered to tell the court how much money he had made on performances by the Drifters.

After learning of Faye Treadwell's declining health, daughter Tina Treadwell left her position as vice president at Disney to continue the court battle, filing parallel lawsuits in the US and the UK in December 2006. Tina Treadwell said of Marshak and his associates, "They've diluted the brand with impostors." 20/20 reported in 2007 that promoters Charles Mehlich and Larry Marshak were being sued in New Jersey for using the Drifters' name. Marshak, his associate Barry Singer, and their attorney William L. Charron countersued, charging that New Jersey's Attorney General Anne Milgram should not have issued subpoenas to the Atlantic City Hilton Casino in her effort to enforce the state's recently passed Truth in Music law, to stop performances by groups billed as the Platters, the Drifters and the Coasters. The countersuit was seen as the first legal challenge to the Truth in Music legislation. In September 2007, U.S. District Judge Dickinson R. Debevoise found Marshak in contempt of court for continuing to use the group names after the 1999 injunction against him doing so. The court discovered that Marshak had employed business associates and his relatives to run legal entities which promoted concerts by the Platters, the Coasters and the Drifters despite having no original singers among the performers. Debevoise called this deceptive business practice "an elaborate shell game." Marshak appealed, but lost in July 2009.

Barry Singer's business, Singer Management Consultants, was ordered to pay $24 million in damages, with $9 million going to Faye Treadwell, but Singer filed for personal bankruptcy under Chapter 7. In September 2010, a federal appeals court determined that Singer must pay Treadwell regardless of his bankruptcy filing. Faye Treadwell died in 2011.

The Truth in Music legislation was dealt a blow in August 2010 after a federal appeals court ordered the state of New Jersey to pay "significant" attorney's fees to Marshak and his associates.

== Federal legislation ==
In March 1999, during the 106th Congress, Representative Dennis Kucinich introduced a "Truth in Rock" bill (H.R. 1125). Musicians Jon "Bowzer" Bauman testified in support of the bill before the House Intellectual Property Subcommittee; Mary Wilson also lobbied for the legislation. The bill was intended "to amend the Trademark Act of 1946 to increase the penalties for infringing the rights pertaining to famous performing groups and to clarify the law pertaining to the rights of individuals who perform services as a group." The bill "died" (was not recommended for further action.)

== Legislation by state ==
=== Pennsylvania ===
Pennsylvania was the first state to pass the legislation, doing so in October 2005, effective December 2005.

=== Connecticut ===
Sponsored by State Senator Andrew J. McDonald, Connecticut passed the legislation as "An Act Concerning Truth in Music Advertising", effective July 1, 2006.

=== Illinois ===
Illinois passed the law in 2006.

=== North Dakota ===
North Dakota passed the law in 2006.

=== South Carolina ===
South Carolina passed the law in 2006 as a new section of their existing chapter on unfair trade practices. The section is titled "Deceptive or misleading advertisement of live musical performance; injunction; penalty."

=== Massachusetts ===
Massachusetts State Senator Marc R. Pacheco introduced the bill, which passed into law in 2006.

=== Michigan ===
Michigan State Senator Martha G. Scott introduced the bill in March 2006, and it was debated in June. It passed the State Senate in July, then the House in December. The law came in to effect on December 29, 2006, directly after being signed by Governor Jennifer Granholm.

=== California ===
As sponsored by State Senator Anthony Portantino, California considered the legislation during early 2007, a state analyst noting that the proposed bill duplicated the protections already available under the state's existing unfair practices provisions, the 1872 California Unfair Competition Law. Regardless, the Truth in Music Advertising Act was passed later in 2007, to come into effect on January 1, 2008.

=== Virginia ===
Introduced by Virginia Delegate David Albo who is also the leader of his band Planet Albo, Virginia passed the legislation after discussing it in January–February 2007.

=== Tennessee ===
Tennessee passed the legislation as "Tennessee Truth in Music Advertising Act", part of their Consumer Protection laws. The bill, SB0262, became effective on May 30, 2007, upon the signature of the governor.

=== Florida ===
Florida passed the legislation in June 2007; the State Senate passed the bill unanimously.

=== New Jersey ===
New Jersey heard the proposed legislation in December 2006. The state passed the bill in May 2007.

=== Nevada ===
Nevada's Assembly passed the legislation unanimously in May 2007. After the Senate passed the bill, Governor Jim Gibbons signed it into law on May 31, 2007.

=== Wisconsin ===
Co-sponsored by State Senator Spencer Coggs, Wisconsin heard arguments for the legislation in March 2007. The Senate and Assembly passed the bill without debate in May. Governor Jim Doyle signed the bill into law in July 2007. The statute 100.185 is titled "Fraud, advertising musical performances."

=== Maine ===
Maine's State Representative Elaine Makas introduced the bill in February 2007. It passed in August 2007.

=== New York ===
Sponsored by State Senator John J. Flanagan and Assemblyman Peter M. Rivera, the state of New York passed the legislation, effective starting September 14, 2007.

=== Indiana ===
The Indiana House of Representatives voted unanimously to pass the bill in February 2008. State Representative Bruce Borders, who is also an Elvis impersonator, co-sponsored the legislation in the House. State Senator Bob Deig sponsored the bill in the Senate, where it also passed. The bill was signed into law by Governor Mitch Daniels in March 2008.

=== Colorado ===
Colorado heard arguments for the legislation in February 2008. The bill was passed in April 2008. The law was revised in 2016.

=== Minnesota ===
Minnesota debated the legislation in March 2007. The bill became law effective August 2008.

=== Ohio ===
Ohio's State Senator Bob Schuler introduced the bill in January 2008. The bill was signed into law in January 2009 by Governor Ted Strickland.

=== Oklahoma ===
Introduced by State Representative Mike Thompson, Oklahoma passed the bill in February 2009.

=== Arkansas ===
Arkansas passed the legislation in March 2009.

=== Utah ===
Sponsored by Representative Greg Hughes, Utah's House passed the bill unanimously in March 2009 as "Truth in Music". The Senate passed it, then Governor Jon Huntsman Jr. signed it into law on March 23, 2009.

=== Rhode Island ===
Co-sponsored by State Representative Peter Petrarca and State Senator John J. Tassoni Jr, Rhode Island heard arguments for the legislation in March 2008, the bill titled "An Act Relating to Businesses and Professions – Musical Advertising." In June, the Senate passed the bill unanimously. The bill became law in 2008.

=== Delaware ===
Delaware considered the bill in March 2006 but it died in committee in June that year. The bill was discussed again in 2007–2008 and was signed into law July 2008, effective September 10, 2008.

=== New Mexico ===
New Mexico's State Representative Al Park sponsored the bill which was passed by the House in March 2009.

=== North Carolina ===
Sponsored by State Senator David F. Weinstein, North Carolina passed the legislation in 2009. The bill was titled "An Act to Prohibit the Advertising and Conducting of Certain Live Musical Performances or Productions, to Provide for Enforcement, and to Impose a Penalty."

=== Washington ===
Sponsored by Karen Keiser, Washington considered the legislation during February–April 2009, with both the Senate and the House voting unanimously to pass the bill. On April 16, 2009, the bill was signed into law by Governor Christine Gregoire.

=== New Hampshire ===
Co-sponsored in the House by State Representatives Jackie Cilley and Robert "Bob" Perry, and in the Senate by State Senator Matthew Houde, New Hampshire heard arguments for the legislation in April 2009. Titled "An Act prohibiting the advertising and conducting of certain live musical performances or productions", the bill was signed into law in August 2009, to become effective on January 1, 2010.

=== Oregon ===
Oregon passed the legislation in 2009, the effective date set at January 1, 2010.

=== Maryland ===
Maryland heard State Senator Michael G. Lenett introduce the bill in February 2008, and passed the legislation in 2010 as the "Truth in Music Advertising Act".

=== Kansas ===
Kansas heard arguments for the legislation in February 2009, with Jon "Bowzer" Bauman appearing before the lawmakers. The bill was passed in 2010 as the "Truth in musical performance advertising act."

=== Mississippi ===
Mississippi passed the law in 2010.

=== Georgia ===
Sponsored by State Senator John "Dick" Crosby, Georgia considered the legislation during March 2009, but the bill died in chamber. In April 2010 the bill was recommended for further action. The bill passed in 2014.

=== Hawaii ===
Hawaii passed the legislation in 2020 in the midst of the COVID-19 pandemic.

=== Not enacted ===
Alabama considered the legislation in early 2008, and again in early 2010. The bill died in chamber. Alaska, Arizona, Idaho, Iowa, Kentucky, Louisiana, Missouri, Montana, Nebraska, South Dakota, Texas, Vermont, West Virginia and Wyoming have not passed the legislation.

== See also ==
- Ship of Theseus
