= Danny McBride (musician) =

American singer-songwriter

Daniel McBride a.k.a. Dirty Dan McBride (November 20, 1945 – July 23, 2009) was an American singer-songwriter and guitarist.

== Early life ==
Born Daniel Hatton in Somerville, Massachusetts, and raised in Reading, Massachusetts, McBride graduated from Reading Memorial High School, class of 1963 and from Boston University College of Communication in 1970.

== Career ==
McBride and his group, the Cavaliers, were popular in the early/mid 1960s Boston music scene. However, McBride later became widely known as lead guitarist for Sha Na Na during their heyday, as well as on the band's own TV series of the same name. He appeared in the film Grease in 1978 with Sha Na Na, enjoyed success with other bands and as a solo artist, appeared as an actor and voice-over performer, and was a published writer of humorous pieces for magazines. He died in his sleep on July 23, 2009, in Los Angeles.
