= Dave "Chico" Ryan =

- Birth name: David-Allen Ryan
- Born: April 9, 1948; Arlington, Massachusetts, U.S.
- Died: July 26, 1998 (aged 50); Boston, Massachusetts, U.S.
- Instrument(s): Bass Guitar, Vocals

David "Chico" Ryan (born David-Allen Ryan; April 9, 1948 – July 26, 1998) was an American bass guitarist and singer. He was a member of The Happenings and Sha Na Na.

== Career ==
Ryan was born in Arlington, Massachusetts. He attended Boston University and graduated from Emerson College in 1969. While in college, he performed with The Rockin' Ramrods, a Boston-area group that once released an album under the name Puff and once toured with the Rolling Stones.

He was in the 1960s band The Happenings, which had hits with "See You in September" and "I Got Rhythm".

Following his departure from that band, Ryan became better known when he joined the musical group Sha Na Na in 1973, on bass and vocals. He appeared with the group on the television show Sha Na Na, which aired from 1977 to 1981, and in the movie Grease, in 1978. On the television show, Ryan often roller-skated and yo-yoed while singing.

Ryan went on to become a member of Bill Haley & His Comets in 1979, taking part in Haley's final tour of Europe that fall (including a command performance for Queen Elizabeth II in November). He died on July 26, 1998, in Boston, Massachusetts, of heart failure.

== Film appearances ==
- 1972: Dynamite Chicken (with Sha Na Na) - as himself
- 1978: Grease (with Sha Na Na) - as Johnny Casino and the Gamblers
