= Sha Na Na (TV series) =

- Genre: Variety
- Written by: Gary Jacobs
- Starring: Jon Bauman; Jocko Marcellino; Donny York; Johnny Contardo; Lennie Baker; Danny McBride; Screamin' Scott Simon; Scott Powell as Tony Santini; Denny Green; Dave "Chico" Ryan; Jane Dulo; Pamela Myers; Avery Schreiber; Kenneth Mars; Phil Roth; June Gable; Soupy Sales; Michael Sklar; Karen Hartman
- Country of origin: United States
- Original language: English
- No. of seasons: 4
- No. of episodes: 97

Production
- Executive producer: Pierre Cossette
- Producers: Bernard Rothman and Jack Wohl
- Editor: Darryl Sutton
- Running time: 22 min
- Production company: Pierre Cossette Enterprises

Original release
- Network: Syndicated
- Release: 1977 – 1981

Sha Na Na is a syndicated television variety series that ran from 1977 to 1981 for a total of 97 episodes, hosted by the popular rock & roll/comedy group of the same name. The show was produced by Pierre Cossette and originally distributed by the Lexington Broadcast Services Company. Each episode ran for 22 minutes. Reruns continued to air in syndication through the 1982-1983 television season, after which the series left most markets.

The show featured the group performing hits from the 1950s and 1960s along with comedy skits along the show's nostalgic theme but with a contemporary twist, with performances from that era's well-known acts as well as popular acts of the 1970s. Among the supporting cast members featured in the series were: Jane Dulo, Pamela Myers, Avery Schreiber, Kenneth Mars and Phil Roth (Season 1); June Gable and Soupy Sales (Seasons 2 to 4); Michael Sklar (Season 2); and Karen Hartman (Season 4).

== Cast ==
The members of Sha Na Na during the TV series were Jon "Bowzer" Bauman (Lead vocals, backing vocals), Lennie Baker (Saxophone, lead vocals, backing vocals), Johnny Contardo (Lead vocals, backing vocals), Denny Greene (Lead vocals, backing vocals), Danny "Dirty Dan" McBride (Electric guitar, lead vocals, backing vocals) (left after third season), Jocko Marcellino (Lead vocals, backing vocals, drums), Dave "Chico" Ryan (Lead vocals, backing vocals, bass guitar), "Screamin'" Scott Simon (Piano, lead vocals, backing vocals), Scott "Santini" Powell (Lead vocals, backing vocals), Donald "Donny" York (Lead vocals, backing vocals). Every member was featured with a solo vocal spot during the course of the series. Each was introduced only by his nickname or his first name in a voice-over by Myers at the beginning of each show.

== Quotes ==
During the shows' opening after the cast and guests are mentioned Myers kicks off the show by saying "And now, here they are, all greased up and ready to sing their brains out, Sha Na Na!" while Jon "Bowzer" Bauman would close out each show by saying "Good night, and grease for peace!" with Sha Na Na singing "Goodnight, Sweetheart, Goodnight" as their closing theme song. Myers would announce "This show has been previously recorded," to which was appended "so it could be destroyed in time!" On later shows it would be appended with "Why? I dunno!"

== See also ==
- Sha Na Na § TV series
