= Vincent Taylor (musician) =

American musician

- Born: Christopher Hempstead Donald; July 31, 1948; San Salvador, Bahamas
- Died: April 17, 1974 (aged 25) Charlottesville, Virginia, U.S.
- Genres: Rock; pop
- Occupation: Musician
- Instrument: Guitar
- Formerly of: Sha Na Na

Vincent "Vinnie" Taylor (July 31, 1948 – April 17, 1974) was an American lead guitar player best known from the group, Sha Na Na. His birth name was Christopher Hempstead Donald, and he was born in San Salvador, Bahamas. He graduated from Kent School in 1965 and Columbia College in 1971.

In February 1971 he replaced guitarist Larry "Israel" Packer. He played with the band until he died from an accidental heroin overdose after a concert at University Hall at the University of Virginia on April 17, 1974.

Escaped convict Elmer Edward Solly assumed the name Vinnie Taylor while a fugitive and performed under this stage name.
