= What Am I Crying For (album) =

Studio album by Dennis Yost and The Classics IV
- Released: 1973
- Recorded: 1972
- Studio: Studio One
- Genre: Soft rock
- Label: MGM South
- Producer: Buddy Buie

Classics IV chronology
Song (1970)	What Am I Crying For (1973)

Singles from What Am I Crying For
- 1. "What Am I Crying For" Released: 1972; 2. "Rosanna" Released: 1973; 3. "Make Me Believe It" Released: 1973

What Am I Crying For is the fifth and final album by Dennis Yost and The Classics IV and their only album on MGM South, released in 1973. It was released in Brazil as Love Me or Leave Me Alone the following year.

The album failed to chart. The title track was the band's final Top 40 hit on the Billboard Hot 100, peaking at No. 39.

== Reception ==
Positive reviews greeted the album despite its failure to chart. Billboard states that the album has a considerable middle-of-the-road appeal. Gary Graff describes its title track as a fine example of the group's distinctive sound. Bad Cat states, despite Yost's pleasant voice with a middle-of-the-road approach, his performances were deeper and rougher compared to his previous albums.

== Track listing ==
Side A
No.	Title	Writer(s)	Length
1.	"Make Me Believe"	Buie, Nix, R. Hammond	2:29
2.	"Save The Sunlight"	Buie, Lee, Cobb	2:50
3.	"Sweet Surrender"	Gates	2:42
4.	"All In Your Mind"	Buie, Nix	3:02
5.	"Rosanna"	Buie, Cobb	2:30

Side B
No.	Title	Writer(s)	Length
6.	"Help Me Help Myself"	Daughtry, Goddard, Nix	2:20
7.	"The Days Of Our Lives"	Bailey, Buie, Cobb, Nix	3:00
8.	"It Never Rains in Southern California"	A. Hammond, Hazlewood	3:40
9.	"One Man Show"	Traina	3:20
10.	"What Am I Crying For"	Buie, Cobb	3:00

== Personnel ==
Production

- Producer: Buddy Buie

== Charts ==
Singles

Year	Single	Chart	Position
1972	"What Am I Crying For"	U.S. Billboard Hot 100	39
1972	"What Am I Crying For"	U.S. Billboard Easy Listening	7
1973	"Rosanna"	U.S. Billboard Hot 100	95
1973	"Rosanna"	U.S. Billboard Easy Listening	35
