= Scott Powell =

Dr. Scott Powell
- Also known as: Santini
- Born: August 13, 1948 (age 78); Newark, New Jersey United States
- Origin: New York City, New York
- Genres: Rock
- Occupations: Singer, Orthopedic Surgeon
- Formerly of: Sha Na Na

Dr. Scott Powell, born August 13, 1948, in Newark, New Jersey, is an American Rock musician/singer and orthopedic surgeon.

== Biography ==
Powell was a founding member of the group Sha Na Na, which began at Columbia University in 1969 under the name The Kingsmen. The name was later changed to avoid confusion with another band of the same name.

Powell was also known as 'Captain Outrageous and 'Tony Santini'. He performed with Sha Na Na at the Woodstock Festival in 1970 and in Japan and Europe. He was known as Santini in the Sha Na Na television series, which aired from 1977 to 1981. He sang many Elvis Presley songs on the show. He also appeared in the movie Grease with Sha Na Na, singing lead on Hound Dog.

Powell left the group in 1981 and went back to Columbia. He took premedical courses and pursued a successful career as an orthopedic surgeon.

== Education ==
- Hotchkiss School
- Columbia College of Columbia University
- New York University
- Albert Einstein College of Medicine
- St. Lukes-Roosevelt Hospital Center
- NYU Hospital for Joint Diseases
- Kerlan-Jobe Orthopedic Clinic in Los Angeles

== Current status ==
Dr. Powell is an orthopedic surgeon and founder of an orthopedics and sports medicine practice in Santa Monica, California. He is a member of the Arthroscopy Association of North America, the American Orthopedic Society of Sports Medicine, and the American Academy of Orthopedic Surgeons.

He served as a team physician for the United States Soccer Federation, including the U.S. Women’s National Soccer Team and the U.S. Men’s Under-20 National Soccer Team.

He was formerly a Clinical Professor at Keck School of Medicine at the University of Southern California. He also served on the Board of Directors of United Cerebral Palsy and MusiCares, the charitable arm of the Grammy Awards.

Dr. Powell is married to physician Cynthia Boxrud.

== Movie appearances ==
- 1970 – Woodstock – as himself with Sha Na Na
- 1972 – Dynamite Chicken – as himself with Sha Na Na
- 1978 – Grease – with Sha Na Na as Johnny Casino and The Gamblers
- 1980 – Caddyshack – Gatsby
- 1994 – Woodstock Diary – as himself with Sha Na Na
- 2003 – Festival Express – as himself with Sha Na Na
