= Elliot Cahn =

American singer-songwriter and guitarist

- Born: Elliot Cahn
- Other name: Gino (Sha Na Na)
- Education: Columbia University; UC Berkeley School of Law
- Occupations: Singer; Guitarist; Entertainment Attorney; Personal Music Manager
- Musical career
- Genres: Doo-wop; rock; pop
- Instruments: Vocals; Guitar

Elliot Cahn is an American singer, guitarist, entertainment attorney, and personal music manager best known for being one of the founding members of the Doo-wop group, Sha Na Na (1969–1973). As an entertainment attorney he has represented such artists as The Offspring, Papa Roach, and Rancid and was the personal manager of the band, Green Day, among others.

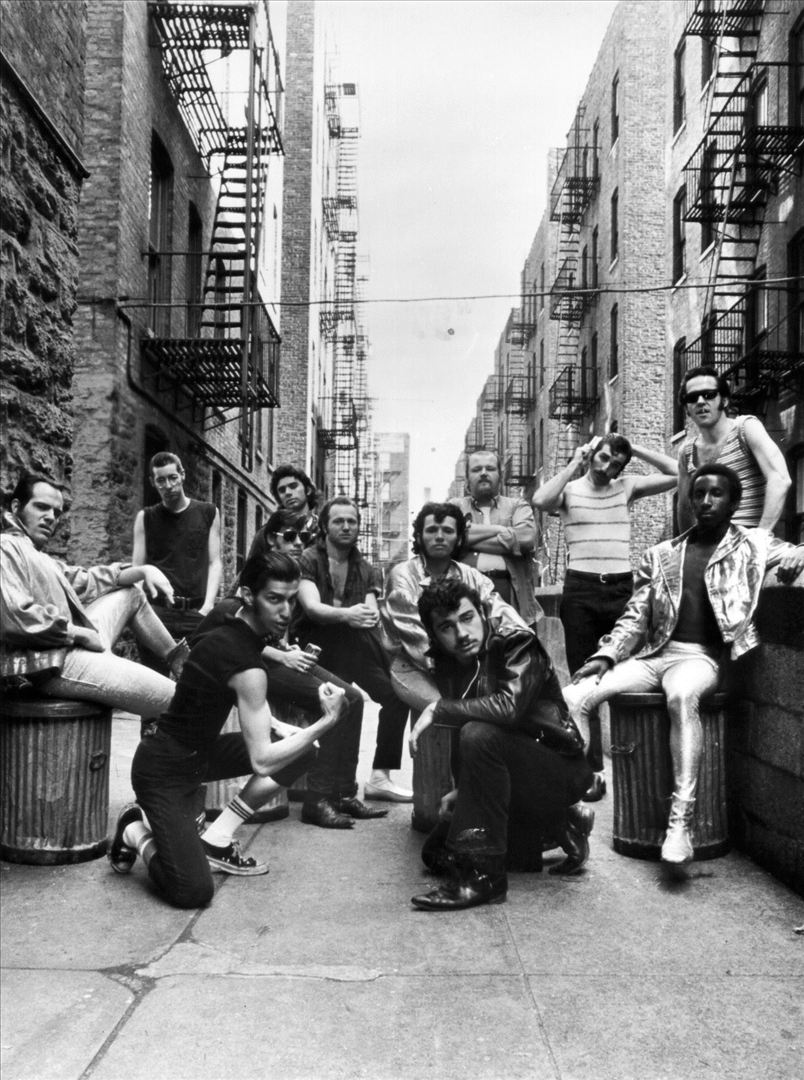
Sha Na Na 1972, Cahn back row 2nd from left

== Career ==
Cahn was one of Sha Na Na's founding members while attending Columbia University with a group of students who shared an interest in harmonies inspired by 1950s doo-wop groups. The band performed at Woodstock in 1969 (after being invited to perform by Jimi Hendrix) and appeared in the Oscar winning film, Woodstock (film) in 1970, as well. Cahn performed on Sha Na Na's live recorded album, The Golden Age of Rock n' Roll, with record sales exceeding 500,000 copies.

In 1995, Cahn and Jeff Saltzman launched 510 Records, a joint venture with MCA Records, signing Dance Hall Crashers, among others.
