= What Am I Crying For (song) =

1972 single by Classics IV

Single by Dennis Yost and The Classics IV

from the album What Am I Crying For
- B-side: "All in Your Mind"
- Released: 1972
- Recorded: 1972
- Studio: Studio One
- Genre: Soft rock
- Length: 3:00
- Label: MGM South
- Songwriter(s): Buddy Buie; J. R. Cobb
- Producer(s): Buddy Buie

Classics IV singles chronology
| "It's Time for Love" (1972) | "What Am I Crying For" (1972) | "Rosanna" (1973) |

"What Am I Crying For" is a song by American band Dennis Yost and The Classics IV. It was released as a single in 1972 from the album of the same title.

The song was the band's final Top 40 hit on the Billboard Hot 100, peaking at No. 39. It was also their second and final Top 10 hit on the Adult Contemporary chart, peaking at No. 7.

== Chart performance ==
| Chart (1972) | Peak position |
|---|---|
| US Billboard Hot 100 | 39 |
| US Billboard Easy Listening | 7 |
