= Phil Roth =

American actor (1930–2002)

Philip Roth
- Born: July 6, 1930; Kansas City, Missouri, United States
- Died: July 15, 2002 (aged 72); Los Angeles, United States

Philip Roth (July 6, 1930 – July 15, 2002) was an American television and film actor.

Roth appeared in over twenty television shows and movies beginning in 1961 with a small role in an episode of Tallahassee 7000. He had roles in several notable films of the early 1970s, such as What's Up, Doc? where he played 'Mr Jones', Catch-22 as Doctor, One Flew Over the Cuckoo's Nest as Woolsey, and Harry and Tonto as Vegas Gambler. He also had roles in numerous smaller films as well as several TV shows such as The Monkees as Howard Needleman, Tales from the Dark Side as Sam Larchmont/Wilson Farber, and Cagney and Lacey as Sullivan.

Roth served in the U.S. Army during World War II.

== Filmography ==
Year	Title	Role	Notes
1967	The Monkees	Howard Needleman	S1:E23, "Captain Crocodile"
1970	Catch-22	Doctor	
1972	What's Up, Doc?	Mr. Jones	
1973	Blume in Love	Party Guest	Uncredited
1973	Tidal Wave		US version
1974	Harry and Tonto	Vegas Gambler	
1974	Linda Lovelace for President	Polish Speaker	
1975	Whiffs	Waiter	
1975	One Flew Over the Cuckoo's Nest	Woolsey	
1977	Prime Time a.k.a. American Raspberry	Doctor Burns	
1980	The Baltimore Bullet	Bookie	
1980	First Family	Tomato Assassin	
1983	Blood Feud	Electronics Expert	Television film
1985	Tales from the Darkside	Sam Larchmont (voice)	"It All Comes Out in the Wash" episode
1985	Tales from the Darkside	Wilson Farber	"The Satanic Piano" episode
1998	A League of Old Men		(final film role)
