= Jon Bauman =

American singer (b. 1947)

Jon "Bowzer" Bauman
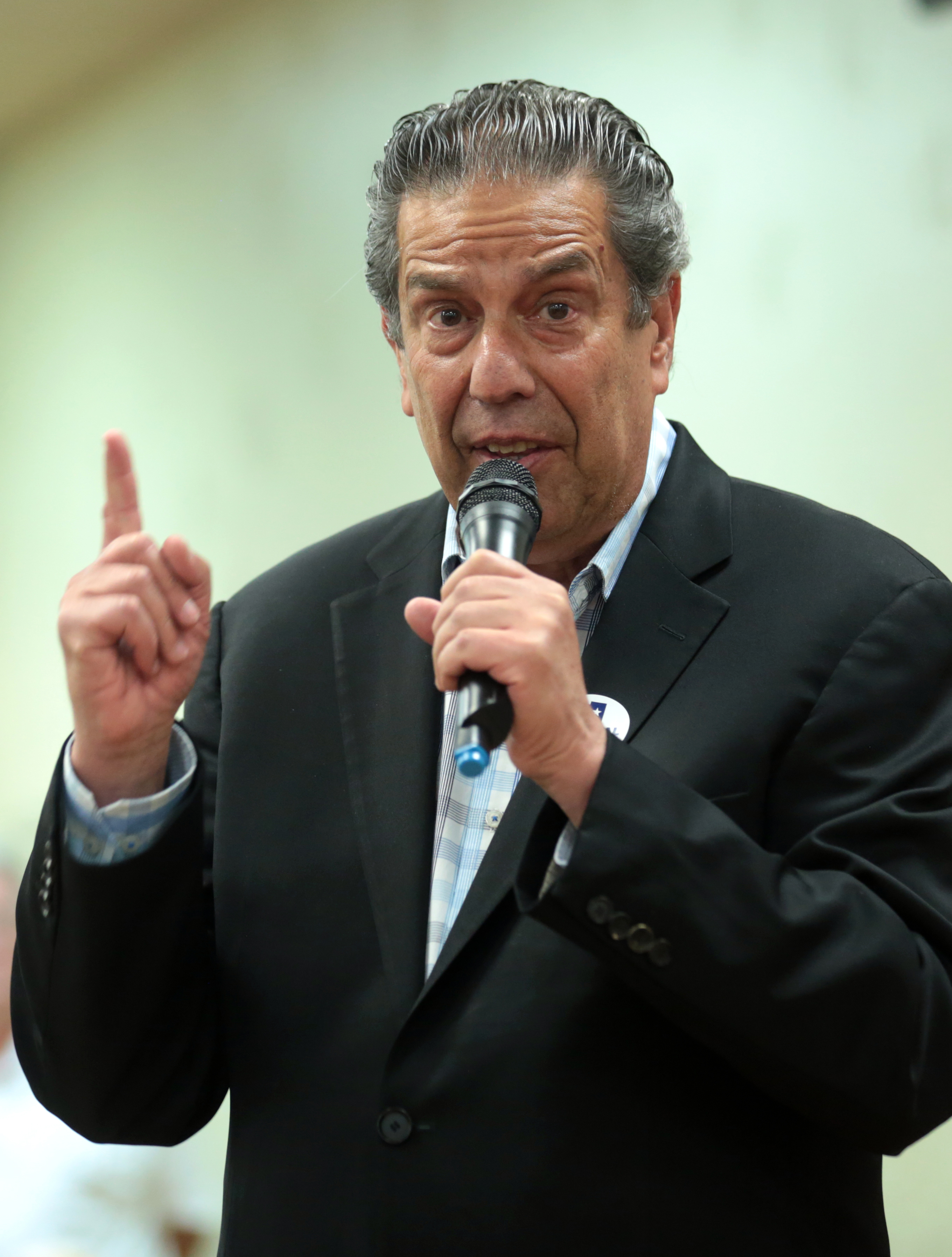
- Bauman in 2018
- Born: September 14, 1947 (age 79); Brooklyn, New York, U.S.
- Education: Juilliard School, Columbia University (BA)
- Occupations: Singer, game show host, political spokesman, actor
- Years active: 1969–present
- Spouse: Mary Ryerson (m. 1978)
- Children: 2
- Relatives: Eric C. Bauman (nephew)

Signature
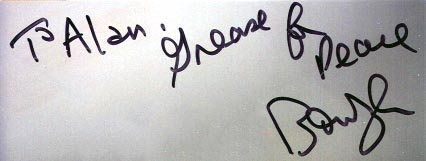

Jon "Bowzer" Bauman (born September 14, 1947) is an American singer, best known as a member of the band Sha Na Na, and game show host. Bauman's Sha Na Na character Bowzer was a greaser in a muscle shirt.

== Biography and career ==
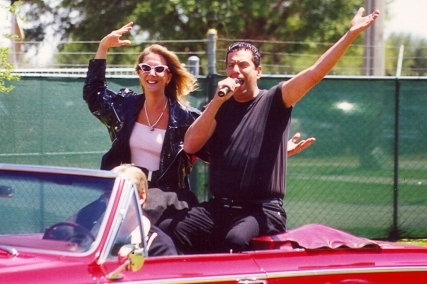
Bauman with Peggy "Sue" Papadonski in 2000

Bauman was born in Brooklyn, New York, to Polish-German Jewish immigrants. His father was a dentist and a singer in the Hollis Hills Jewish Center choir. Bauman started attending The Juilliard School at age 12 with an expertise in piano playing, and he is a 1964 graduate of Martin Van Buren High School. He graduated from Columbia University in 1968. Bauman was a member of the band Sha Na Na from 1970 to 1983. He was featured in the television comedy/variety show Sha Na Na from 1977 to 1981. In his Bowzer persona, Bauman became instantly recognizable for his "greaser" clothes and hair, his muscular pose with his arm, and his catchphrase "Grease for Peace!" In the late 1970s, Bauman appeared as Bowzer (loosely in-character) on many game shows, including Match Game and Password Plus. He also appeared with Sha Na Na in the 1978 movie Grease. After his heyday with Sha Na Na, Bauman was a VJ on the music channel VH-1 during its first two years. He has appeared on many television series, such as Miami Vice, and he has done voiceovers for animated series, such as Animaniacs, and animated feature films, including My Little Pony: The Movie and The Jetsons Meet the Flintstones. He also hosted the Hollywood Squares half of the Match Game-Hollywood Squares Hour. Bauman also hosted The Pop 'N Rocker Game, a weekly, syndicated rock 'n' roll game show, which launched a few weeks before the Match Game-Hollywood Squares Hour premiered.

Jon Bauman Productions produced The Golden Age of Rock 'n' Roll, a 10-hour series for the A&E Network.

Bauman toured extensively with his Bowzer and the Stingrays group at fairs, amusement parks, cruise ships, malt shoppes and conventions. They headline "Bowzer's Ultimate Milkshake Party". On October 28, 2024, Bauman announced his intent to retire following a series of winter shows.

== Personal life ==
Bauman lives in Los Angeles with his wife Mary and their two children, Nora and Eli. His nephew was Eric C. Bauman, former chairman of the California Democratic Party.

Bauman has spoken on behalf of musicians who are upset about contemporary groups who use classic groups' names even though none of the members performed on any of the albums. Before their deaths, Charlie Thomas of the Drifters, Mary Wilson of the Supremes, Carl Gardner of the Coasters and original Drifter Bill Pinkney were supporters. Bauman has helped pass legislation that compels any group using the name of a classic group to have at least one of the original members. The measure is known as the Truth in Music Act.

Bauman regularly campaigns for Democrats in special elections, including Mark Critz in 2010, Kathy Hochul in 2011, David Weprin in 2011 and Elizabeth Colbert Busch in 2013. He endorsed Barack Obama for president in 2008. He has also worked as a spokesman for the National Committee to Preserve Social Security and Medicare and recorded wake-up calls for employees of the Democratic Congressional Campaign Committee. He is also a co-founder of the group Senior Votes Count, which is a political action committee designed to elect leaders to protect and advance the rights of elderly Americans. In the 2016 presidential election, Bauman endorsed Hillary Clinton, campaigning for her across the country, including in Iowa and Ohio.

He is currently president of Social Security Works PAC, a national organization working to elect candidates who support protecting and expanding Social Security benefits.

== In popular media ==
Bauman is referenced in "The Chanukah Song" by Adam Sandler, "Parents Just Don't Understand" by DJ Jazzy Jeff & the Fresh Prince, the NewsRadio episode "Chock", and in "D'oh-in' in the Wind—the sixth episode of the tenth season of The Simpsons.

He can be seen as his Bowzer character on a limousine television (with passengers Peter Sellers and Shirley MacLaine) in the Hal Ashby film Being There and in the top left seat on Match Game '79 (5 episodes, 1386-1390).

Preceded by Peter Marshall; 1966–81	Host of The Hollywood Squares; 1983–84	Succeeded by John Davidson; 1986–89
