= Lennie Baker =

American musician (1946–2016)

- Born: April 18, 1946; Whitman, Massachusetts, U.S.
- Died: February 24, 2016 (aged 69); Weymouth, Massachusetts, U.S.
- Education: Whitman-Hanson Regional High School; Northeastern University
- Occupations: Singer; saxophone player
- Spouse: Laura Campbell (m. 1980–1989)

Lennie Baker (April 18, 1946 – February 24, 2016) was an American singer and saxophone player for Sha Na Na.

Baker was born in Whitman, Massachusetts. He went on to become a member of the musical group Sha Na Na, doing vocals and playing sax. He toured with the group, and appeared with them on the television series, Sha Na Na, which aired from 1978 to 1981. He was also in the movie Grease with them, singing lead on the song "Blue Moon". He appeared in several other movies with the group, as well.

Baker graduated from Whitman-Hanson Regional High School and Northeastern University in Boston, Massachusetts, where he joined Phi Kappa Tau fraternity.

== Later life and death ==
Baker retired in 2000 to Martha's Vineyard in Massachusetts. In January 2014, Lennie returned to support his alma mater, Whitman Hanson Regional High School and its drama club's production of Grease, singing "Blue Moon" as he did in the motion picture to a capacity crowd. He died on February 24, 2016, in Weymouth, Massachusetts, at the age of 69. He had been hospitalized with an infection. He was survived by his former wife Laura Campbell (1980-1989), 3 brothers, nieces and nephews and grandnieces and grandnephews.

== Movie appearances ==
- 1972 - Dynamite Chicken - as himself with Sha Na Na
- 1978 - Grease - with Sha Na Na as Johnny Casino and the Gamblers
- 1994 - Woodstock Diary - as himself with Sha Na Na
- 2003 - Festival Express - as himself with Sha Na Na
