= Jocko Marcellino =

American musician (born 1950)

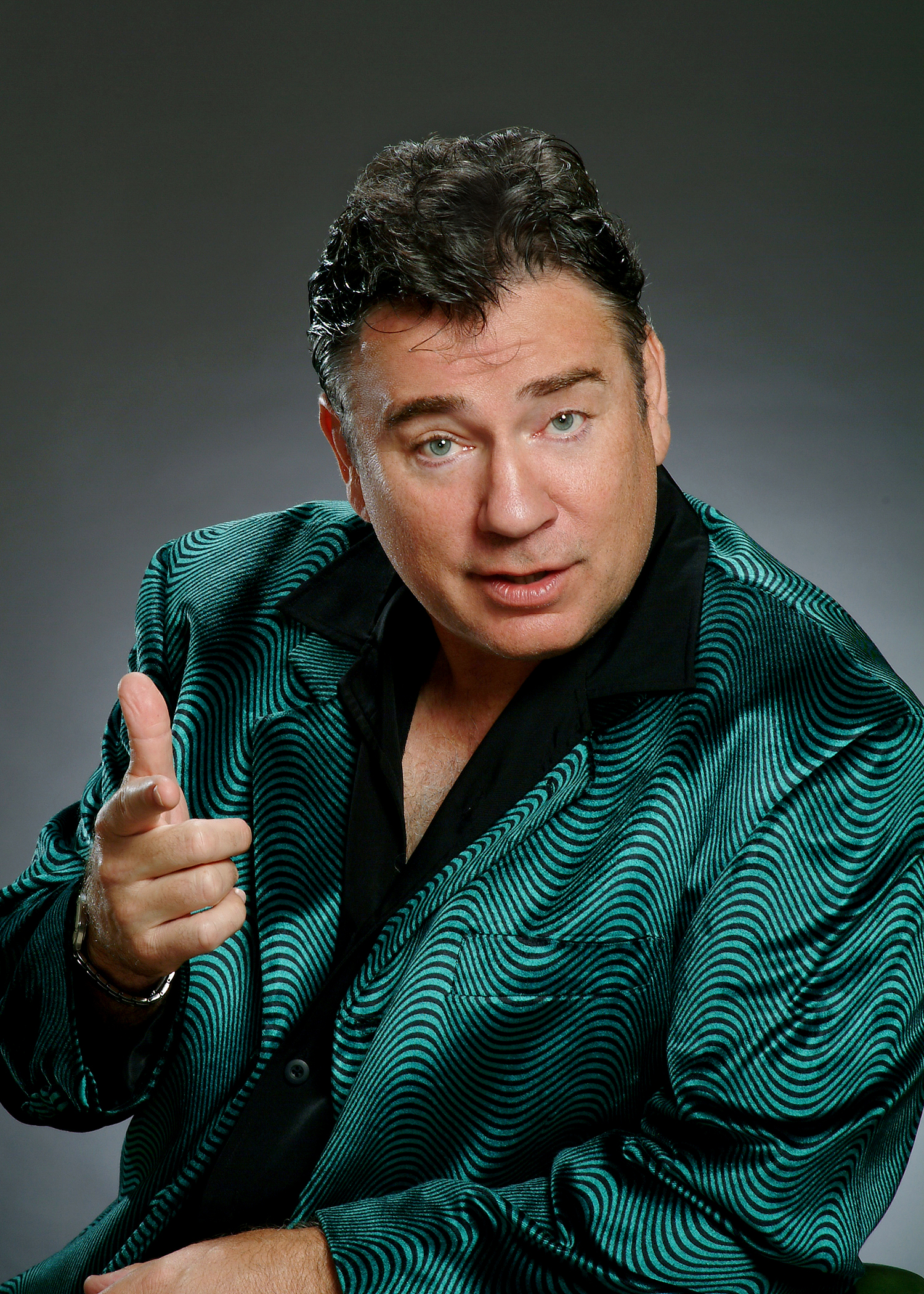
- Marcellino in 2004

Background information
- Born: John Fair Marcellino; May 12, 1950 (age 76); Quincy, Massachusetts, U.S.
- Genre: Rock
- Occupations: Musician, actor
- Instruments: Drums, vocals
- Years active: 1969–present
- Formerly of: Sha Na Na

John Fair "Jocko" Marcellino (born May 12, 1950) is an American musician and actor best known as one of the founders of the rock and roll group Sha Na Na, where he performed drums and vocals. He performed with Sha Na Na at the original Woodstock Festival, in the movie Grease and on their eponymous syndicated TV show.

== Early life and education ==
Marcellino was born in Quincy, Massachusetts, and raised in Braintree, the fifth of six children. His younger sister is Noella Marcellino. He began drumming at age seven and formed his first band, The Miltones from Milton, Massachusetts, at age 13. At 17, he joined The Pilgrims with saxophonist Lennie Baker, whom he later recruited for Sha Na Na. He was also an all conference and all state football player at Archbishop Williams High School in Braintree. He attended Columbia University as member of the class of 1972. Marcellino earned a B.A. from Columbia University and later a master's degree in drama from New York University.

== Career ==
=== Sha Na Na ===
During his freshman year at the age of 19, a group of students and Marcellino formed Sha Na Na. In the summer of 1969, Marcellino performed with Sha Na Na at Woodstock, only the group's eighth performance.

Marcellino continued to tour with Sha Na Na, along with co-founder Donny York and long-term member Screamin' Scott Simon. Sha Na Na announced they would no longer tour on December 5, 2022. He also tours with his side rhythm and blues band "Jocko and the Rockets".

=== Acting ===
Marcellino's acting credits include television's Veronica Mars, NYPD Blue, Ally McBeal, The Tiger Woods Story, Herman's Head, Good Advice, 18 Wheels of Justice, The Invisible Man, Amazing Stories, and It's Garry Shandling's Show.

He also acted in the films Rain Man, National Security and Hot to Trot. Marcellino has also written and performed songs for the films Rain Man, That's Life and Night of the Comet; and television shows Law & Order: Special Victims Unit, The Office, Terriers, Castle, Kath & Kim, Parks and Recreation, Golden Boy, Once Upon a Time and ESPN's Monday Countdown.

== Personal life ==
Marcellino lives with his wife in La Jolla, California. His younger sister, Benedictine nun Mother Noella Marcellino, is an international cheese expert, and was featured in a PBS documentary called The Cheese Nun.
