= Robert A. Leonard =

American singer

- Education: B.A. cum laude, M.A., M.Phil., Ph.D.
- Alma mater: Columbia University
- Occupation: Forensic linguistics
- Employer: Hofstra University
- Organization: Robert Leonard Associates
- Known for: Work in forensic linguistics Singer in the band Sha Na Na that performed at Woodstock
- Title: Director, Institute for Forensic Linguistics, Hofstra University
- Website: robertleonardassociates.com

Robert Andrew Leonard is an American linguist. He is best known for his work in forensic linguistics, which relates to investigating problems of the law by using the study of language. This includes analyzing legal material work such as notes, audio and video tape recordings, contracts, and confessions. Prior to his academic career, Leonard was a founding member of the rock band Sha Na Na and performed at Woodstock.

== Biography ==
While he was working on his undergraduate degree at Columbia University, Leonard and his brother George became members of the school's a cappella group. In 1969, the doo-wop band Sha Na Na was born when George suggested changing the style of the group to a faux Brooklyn thug style, with slicked back hair, and white shirts. Rob Leonard, who was the bass singer of the band, sang the lead on “Teen Angel” when the band opened for their friend Jimi Hendrix at Woodstock. Leonard was listed by TIME magazine as #2 of the "top ten smartest rock stars". Leonard spent two years with the band, until he stopped at the age of twenty-one. He left the band because he was offered a fellowship at Columbia University Graduate School and wanted to further his education in linguistics.

== Education and qualifications ==
Leonard began his education at Columbia College, receiving his BA and graduating in 1970 cum laude and Phi Beta Kappa with a degree in sociology. He then moved on to the Columbia Graduate School as a faculty fellow, receiving his MA and MPhil in linguistics in 1973, and his PhD in linguistics in 1982. While receiving his PhD at Columbia, he was trained by William Diver, founder of the Columbia School of Linguistics, and William Labov, founder of variationist sociolinguistics. During a Fulbright Fellowship tenure which lasted from 1974 to 1975, Leonard studied at the University of Nairobi in Kenya. He held a position as a research associate at the Institute of African Studies. His other training includes Advanced Linguistics Training at the Linguistic Society Institute, and Leonard studied at the University of Michigan, Ann Arbor, in the summer of 1973 and the University of Hawaii, Honolulu, in the summer of 1977. Leonard also studied the Thai language at the American University Alumni Association in Bangkok, Thailand, during the summer of 1976.

Leonard is qualified as an expert witness in linguistics in twelve states, and six Federal district courts (Arizona, California, Colorado, Florida, Illinois, Indiana, Michigan, Montana, New Jersey, New York, Nevada, and Pennsylvania, and in U.S. district courts in Newark, New Jersey, Austin, Texas, New York, New York, San Jose, California, Tampa, Florida, and Denver, and he has also testified before World Bank ICSID tribunals in Washington, D.C., and Paris. In addition, he knows how to speak and read several varieties of Swahili, as well as French and Spanish. He knows how to read Italian, and has structural knowledge of Giriama, Kamba, Rabai, Pokomo (Kenya), Shona (Zimbabwe), Thai, and Arabic.

== Career ==
Leonard has assisted in solving many cases. Examples include:

- The murder of JonBenet Ramsay: Leonard testified that the ransom note had not been written by John Mark Karr, who falsely confessed to the murder.
- The murder of Charlene Hummert: Leonard testified that the writing of Charlene's husband Brian Hummert matched the letters supposedly sent by a stalker to Charlene Hummert. Leonard's explanation was partially based on the contraction patterns of positive and negative statements. Brian Hummert was guilty of the murder.
- The Tennessee Facebook murders: Leonard testified that a supposed CIA agent named "Chris", who presumably accepted the murders as a CIA hit, wrote a series of Facebook messages that were consistent with the writing patterns of the two suspects, Jenelle and Barbara Potter. Leonard's analysis explained partially the use of the peculiar placement of quotation marks; in this case, the beginning of the sentence contained a single quote, but the end contained a double quote. Both Jenelle and Barbara Potter were complicit in the murders.
- Featured on many TV shows such as Forensic Files; A Tight Leash, Uncovering the Truth (Byron Case and Michael Politte exoneration cases on MTV); and Too Pretty to Live: The Catfishing Murders of East Tennessee on Investigation Discovery.
- Presented "The Groundbreaking Science of Forensic Linguistics" at the Polyglot Conference in 2015.

Leonard founded and directs the graduate program in forensic linguistics at Hofstra University, where he is professor of linguistics. He previously taught at Columbia.

The New Yorker wrote that Leonard “has emerged as one of the foremost language detectives in the country,” and jocularly termed him “a Sam Spade of semantics.” Newsday characterized him as “Professor Henry Higgins meets Sherlock Holmes.” Leonard's forensic linguistic consulting clients have included the NYPD Hate Crimes Task Force, the FBI, Federal Public Defenders offices, and the Prime Minister of Canada.

The Behavioral Analysis Unit of the FBI recruited Leonard to train agents in forensic linguistic analysis at Quantico, and he has trained British law enforcement units in London. He was Apple's linguist in its civil trademark cases against both Microsoft and Amazon. Salon pointed out that Leonard came from quite a different former career path and noted Leonard's quip, "I like to say I'm one of the very few people in the world who have worked with the FBI and the Grateful Dead." (He trained FBI agents in how to analyze language for clues in solving crimes and previously helped to found and sang with Sha Na Na that had opened for groups such as Grateful Dead.)

Leonard serves as a member of the editorial board of the Oxford University Press series Language and the Law.
