= Alan Cooper (biblical scholar) =

American academic

Academic background
- Education: Columbia University (BA); Yale University (MPhil, PhD)

Academic work
- Discipline: Religious studies
- Sub-discipline: Jewish studies
- Institutions: McMaster University; Hebrew Union College – Jewish Institute of Religion; Union Theological Seminary; Jewish Theological Seminary of America

Alan Cooper is an American religious scholar and former musician who was the provost of the Jewish Theological Seminary of America (JTS), an academic institution that teaches Jewish studies and one of the centers for Conservative Judaism. He is also the Elaine Ravich Professor of Jewish Studies at JTS.

== Education ==
Cooper graduated with a Bachelor of Arts degree from Columbia College in 1971 and went on to do his graduate work at Yale University, where he obtained a Master of Philosophy and PhD in religious studies.

== Career ==
Cooper was formerly a singer in the band Sha Na Na, formed by his Columbia classmates, and sang the lead in "At the Hop" in Woodstock. He also made appearances on The Tonight Show and The Merv Griffin Show.

Cooper served on the faculties of McMaster University and Hebrew Union College – Jewish Institute of Religion. In 1997, he was appointed to a position at the Jewish Theological Seminary of America. In 1998, he was appointed Professor of Bible at the Union Theological Seminary in New York, becoming the first person to hold a joint professorship at both Union and JTS. His dual appointment has been described as a major step in strengthening ties between the two seminaries.
