= Denny Greene =

American singer

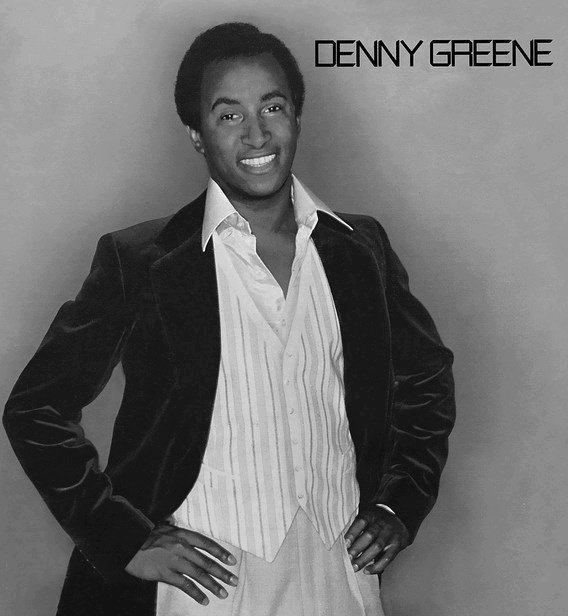
Greene c. 1977

Frederick Dennis Greene (January 11, 1949 – September 5, 2015) was an American singer who was a member of Sha Na Na who were formed in 1969 at Columbia University in New York as the Columbia Kingsmen.

The television show Sha Na Na aired from 1978 to 1981. Greene choreographed most of the moves for the show, on which he was known simply as Denny. Denny was portrayed in the series as the most intelligent member of Sha Na Na. He sang lead in the song "Tears on My Pillow" when he appeared with Sha Na Na in the movie Grease, in 1978. Denny also performed at Woodstock with Sha Na Na, just before Jimi Hendrix.

== Education ==
Greene was born in New York, New York and raised in Harlem and the Bronx. He received his high school diploma from the Hotchkiss School. He obtained a BA degree from Columbia University in 1971. After he left Sha Na Na, he earned a Master of Education from Harvard University in 1984. He then attended law school, which he had been interested in doing since childhood, graduating with a J.D. from Yale Law School in 1987.

== Career ==
After Greene graduated from Yale Law School, he worked as Vice President of Production and Features at Columbia Pictures. Following that, he was President at Lenox/Greene films. He taught at Florida A&M University and the University of Oregon School of Law where he taught entertainment law, “Race, Mass Media, and the Law”, and other courses. He was also a visiting professor at several other universities including Ohio State, Seton Hall, and the University of Connecticut.

Greene also served on the Board of Directors for the Society of American Law Teachers and is listed in Who's Who Among African-Americans.

From December 2007 until his death, Greene was a Professor of Law at the University of Dayton School of Law, teaching classes such as Torts, Entertainment Law, and Constitutional Law.

Greene died in Dayton on September 5, 2015, from esophageal cancer just a few weeks after his diagnosis. He was 66.

== Movie appearances ==
- 1970 - Woodstock - as himself with Sha Na Na
- 1972 - Dynamite Chicken - as himself with Sha Na Na
- 1977 - Greased Lightning - Slack
- 1978 - Grease - with Sha Na Na as Johnny Casino and the Gamblers
- 1994 - Woodstock Diary - as himself with Sha Na Na
- 2003 - Festival Express - as himself with Sha Na Na

== Publications ==
- 1994 Tragically Hip: Hollywood and African American Film
- 1996 The Resurrection of Gunga Din, 81 Iowa Law Review
- 1997 Immigrants in Chains: Afrophobia in American Legal History, 76 Oregon Law Review
- 1998 Cultural Colonization in the Hollywood Film, 5 Asian Law Journal
