= Sha Na Na =

American rock and roll band

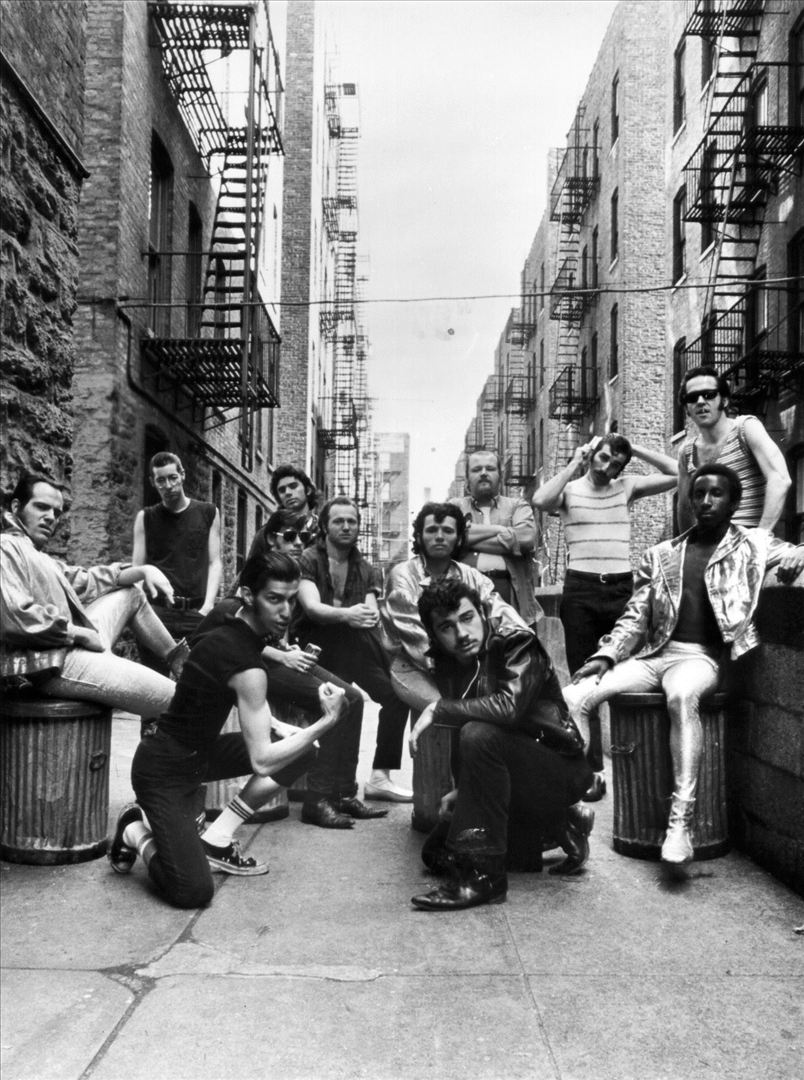
- Sha Na Na in 1972

Background information
- Origin: Columbia University; New York City, U.S.
- Genres: Rock and roll revival; doo-wop
- Years active: 1969–2022
- Labels: Kama Sutra; Buddah
- Past members: Former members

Sha Na Na was an American rock and roll and doo-wop revival group formed in 1969. The group performed a song-and-dance repertoire based on 1950s hit songs that both revived and parodied the music and the New York City street culture of the 1950s. After gaining initial fame for their performance at the Woodstock Music and Art Fair, made possible with help from their friend Jimi Hendrix, the group hosted Sha Na Na, a syndicated variety series that ran from 1977 to 1981.

Billing themselves as "from the Streets of New York", members were frequently outfitted in gold lamé or leather jackets and sported pompadour or ducktail hairdos. The group's name was taken from a series of nonsense syllables ("sha na na na, sha na na na na") in the song "Get a Job", originally recorded by the Silhouettes.

The final lineup featured original members Donny York and Jocko Marcellino, and longtime member Screamin' Scott Simon, who joined in 1970. Everyone else from the original band and TV show had since departed.

Sha Na Na released their last regular album in 2006, although they subsequently released compilation albums. As of December 5, 2022, they announced that they would no longer tour.

== Career ==
Conceived by George Leonard, then a humanities graduate student, who also became the group's original choreographer, Sha Na Na began performing in 1969 at the height of the hippie counterculture. Only five months after Leonard had explained his concept to the group, on the basis of excitement their performances had generated in a New York City club frequented by famous rock musicians and others from the music business, and with the help of Jimi Hendrix, a friend they had met at the club, they obtained a slot at the Woodstock festival. Their performance immediately preceded that of Hendrix, who closed the festival.

As with most of their other early performances, Sha Na Na's performance at Woodstock was a "show stopper" that left the audience simultaneously "delighted and bewildered." Their set-closing song, the 1957–58 number-one hit "At the Hop", got the group a standing ovation, and they were brought back for an encore. Subsequently, the inclusion of their performance of "At the Hop" in Michael Wadleigh's award-winning documentary film of the festival made Sha Na Na nationally famous and helped spark a 1950s nostalgia craze that inspired similar groups (Flash Cadillac, Showaddywaddy, Big Daddy), as well as the Broadway musical Grease (and its feature film adaptation), the feature film American Graffiti and the TV show Happy Days.

Before 1969, the group had been singing as part of the long-standing Columbia University a cappella group called the Columbia Kingsmen. But when, based on Leonard's advice, they transformed their show and became a commercial act, they changed their name to Sha Na Na to distinguish themselves from the Pacific Northwest group also called The Kingsmen that had become famous for recording the 1963 hit "Louie Louie".

At the time when the group was being transformed from the Columbia Kingsmen into Sha Na Na, George Leonard's brother, Rob Leonard, was one of the group's bass singers and its official leader. Rob Leonard's performance at Woodstock of "Teen Angel", a teen-tragedy classic from 1959-60, was later included in the 2009 Director's Cut of the Woodstock movie.

The group's first manager, Ed Goodgold, had codified trivia as a nostalgic quiz game and conducted the nation's first trivia contests with Dan Carlinsky in 1965. The future Sha Na Na/Kingsmen were featured singers at these contests. Four years later, he co-authored "Rock 'n' Roll Trivia" just as he and the William Morris Agency began steering Sha Na Na's career.

From 1969 to 1971, the band played at, among other places, the Fillmore East and Fillmore West, opening for such bands as the Grateful Dead, the Mothers of Invention, and the Kinks. When Sha Na Na began headlining at other venues, one of their opening acts was Bruce Springsteen. In 1972, Sha Na Na was one of just four acts invited by John Lennon and Yoko Ono to perform with them at their One-to-One benefit concert at Madison Square Garden.

Subsequently, the group appeared in the 1978 movie Grease, and, from 1977 to 1981, the group reached perhaps the height of its success with its own hit syndicated television show Sha Na Na, featuring guest musicians such as James Brown, the punk rock band the Ramones, Chuck Berry, Little Richard, Bo Diddley, the Ronettes, and Chubby Checker.

The original band lineup featured 12 performers: Robert A. Leonard (Rob Leonard) (bass vocals), Alan Cooper (bass vocals), Frederick "Dennis" Greene (vocals), Henry Gross (guitar), Jocko Marcellino (drums), Joe Witkin (piano), Scott Powell (also known as Captain Outrageous and Tony Santini) (vocals), Donald "Donny" York (vocals), Elliot "Gino" Cahn (rhythm guitar), Rich Joffe (vocals), Dave Garrett (vocals), and Bruce "Bruno" Clarke (electric bass). The initial act had three up-front performers in gold lamé and the other nine in "greaser" attire (rolled up T-shirt sleeves, leather jackets, tank tops). On their album The Golden Age of Rock and Roll, the lead singer taunts the audience on one of the live tracks by announcing, "We've got just one thing to say to you fuckin' hippies, and that is that rock and roll is here to stay!" The act usually ended after several encores, and closed with "Lovers Never Say Goodbye". The closing song was changed to "Goodnight Sweetheart" for the TV series. In concert, they often returned for up to seven encores, and this included when performing in Toronto, at Ontario Place and performing "Hound Dog" after announcing Elvis Presley's death earlier that same day (August 16, 1977).

East Timorese militant and state leader Xanana Gusmão reportedly took his nickname from the band.

== TV series ==
Sha Na Na hosted the Sha Na Na syndicated variety series that ran from 1977 to 1981. It was among the most watched programs in syndication during its run. The show was produced by Pierre Cossette and originally distributed by LBS Communications.

The show featured the group performing hits from the 1950s and 1960s, along with comedy skits. The "tough guys" road act from their original road shows was adapted for TV and the group moved to a comedy and self-deprecating routine. The mainstay continued to be the 1950s song-and-dance routines. The show opened in a typical concert scene, and then moved through various street and ice cream parlor scenes, where their guests and they performed several songs. That was followed by a comedy-oriented song ("Alley Oop", "Hello Muddah, Hello Fadduh"), and closed with a slow song, again in their concert format.

Among the supporting members featured in the series were Avery Schreiber, Kenneth Mars, and Philip Roth (all of them in the first season); both Pamela Myers and actress Jane Dulo (the Crabby Lady in the Window, who watched over the street scenes from her apartment with undisguised disdain) throughout the show's run, June Gable, and Soupy Sales (seasons two to four); Michael Sklar (season two); and Karen Hartman (season four).

Guests included Jan & Dean, Fabian, Chuck Berry, Chubby Checker, The Ramones, Ethel Merman, Frank Gorshin, Dusty Springfield, Barbara Mandrell, Stephanie Mills, Billy Crystal, Kim Carnes, Danny and the Juniors, Connie Stevens, Isaac Hayes, Rita Moreno, Del Shannon, Andy Gibb, Barbi Benton, Frankie Avalon, and others.

During the TV series, the members of Sha Na Na were Jon "Bowzer" Bauman (vocals), Lennie Baker (sax/vocals), Johnny Contardo (vocals), Denny Greene (vocals), Danny "Dirty Dan" McBride (guitar/vocals) (left after third season), Jocko Marcellino (drums/vocals), Dave "Chico" Ryan (bass/vocals), Screamin' Scott Simon (piano/vocals), Scott "Santini" Powell (vocals), and Donald "Donny" York (vocals). Every member was featured with a solo vocal spot during the course of the series. Each was introduced only by his nickname or his first name in a voice-over by Myers at the beginning of each show.

== Film ==
The group appeared as itself in the documentaries Woodstock (1970) and Festival Express (2003).

Sha Na Na also appeared in the 1978 film Grease (an adaptation of the 1971 Broadway musical of the same name) as a 1950s band called Johnny Casino and the Gamblers. Their tracks on the film and Grease soundtrack include two songs from the original 1971 musical: "Those Magic Changes" and "Born to Hand Jive", and four songs from the early rock-and-roll era: versions of Elvis Presley's covers of "Hound Dog" (1956) and "Blue Moon" (1956), a cover of the Imperials' "Tears on My Pillow" (1958), and a cover of Danny & the Juniors' "Rock and Roll Is Here to Stay" (1958). The song "Sandy", sung by John Travolta in the film, was co-written specifically for the film by Sha Na Na's Screamin' Scott Simon.

== Personnel ==
In chronological order:

- Donald "Donny" York (1969–2022): original vocalist
- John "Jocko" Marcellino (1969–2022): original drummer, vocalist
- Frederick "Dennis" Greene (1969–1984): original vocalist
- Scott "Captain Outrageous" Powell (1969–1981): original vocalist
- Richard "Joff" Joffe (1969–1973): original vocalist
- Elliot "Gino" Cahn (1969–1973): original rhythm guitarist
- Bruce "Bruno" C. Clarke (1969–1973): original bass guitarist
- Alan Cooper (1969–1970, 1971): original bass singer
- Henry Gross (1969–1970, 1971): original lead guitarist
- David Garrett (1969–1970): original vocalist
- Robert A. Leonard (1969–1970): original vocalist
- Joe Witkin (1969–1970): original pianist
- Screamin' Scott Simon (1970–2022): pianist, vocalist
- Lennie Baker (1970–1999): saxophonist and vocalist
- Jon Bauman, "Bowzer" (1970–1983): bass singer
- Larry Packer (1970): lead guitarist
- Grover Kemble (1970): vocalist
- Billy Schwartz, AKA Billy Cross (1969-1971): lead guitarist
- Christopher Donald (musician) Vinnie Taylor (1971–1974): lead guitarist
- Johnny "Kid" Contardo (1971–1983): vocalist and dancer
- Dave Allan Ryan, Dave "Chico" Ryan (1973–1998), replaced Bruce Clarke
- Elliott "Enrico Ronzoni" Randall (1974–1975): lead guitarist
- Danniel Hatton (musician) "Dirty Dan" Danny McBride (1975–1980): guitarist
- Glenn "Guitar Glenn" Jordan (1980–1986): guitarist
- Dora Pearson (1984–1988): original female vocalist
- Guerin Barry, "Tito Mambo" (1984–1988): bass singer
- Kal David, "Casual Kal" (1984): bass vocalist
- Jimmy "Tune" Huntoon (1986-1989): guitar, bass, keyboards, vocals
- Bryan "Mighty Joe" Cumming (1987–1989): guitarist
- Reggie "Reggie de Leon" Battise (1989–2010): bass singer
- Pamela Day (1989–1991): second female vocalist
- George "Giorgio" Paulos (1989-1990): guitar, bass, keyboards, vocals
- Jim "Billy" Waldbillig (1990–2011): guitarist
- Rob Mackenzie (1990–2001): guitarist; replaced by Buzz
- Lisa Sunstedt (1993–1995): third female vocalist
- Frankie Adell (1999–2005): saxophonist and vocalist
- George Sluppick (1999–2000): drummer
- Paul Kimbarow, "Paulie" (2002–2013): drummer
- Buzz Campbell (2002–2006): guitarist; replaced Rob Mackenzie
- Michael Brown, "Downtown Michael Brown" (2000–2021): saxophonist and vocalist
- Tim Butler (2006, 2009, 2011–2022): bass guitarist
- Gene Jaramillo (2006–2022): guitarist; replaced Buzz Campbell
- Randy Hill, "Rockin' Randy" (2008–2022): lead guitarist
- Ty Cox (2013–2022): drummer
- George Leonard: conception and choreography

=== Member information ===
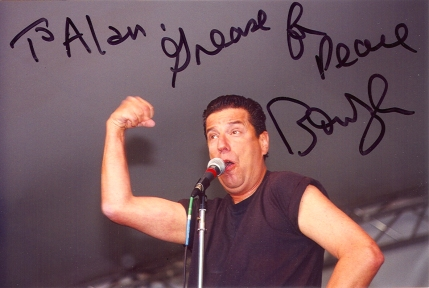
Jon "Bowzer" Bauman, April 2000

Vinnie Taylor (1949–1974) (born Chris Donald), who replaced Billy Schwartz as the lead guitarist in 1971, died of a drug overdose in 1974. Escaped child killer Elmer Edward Solly assumed Taylor's identity and performed as him, though not with Sha Na Na, which eventually led to his discovery and capture.

Bass player Dave "Chico" Ryan died in 1998. While remaining in Sha Na Na, he joined Bill Haley & His Comets for the group's fall 1979 tour of Europe (Haley's last major tour before his death).

Guitarist Danny "Dirty Dan" McBride (born Daniel Hatton, 1945) died of cardiovascular disease in 2009.

Bass guitarist Reggie Battise was a dancer in the feature film Staying Alive (1983) and White Men Can't Jump (1992), as well as the TV series Moonlighting. He succumbed to prostate cancer on October 8, 2010.

Founding member Rob Leonard is a professor of linguistics at Hofstra University. He had an appearance as a qualified expert in linguistics for the murder case of Charlene Hummert in the episode "A Tight Leash" of the TV medical detectives series Forensic Files in 2004, as well as for the Tennessee "Facebook Murders" on the Investigation Discovery crime show Too Pretty to Live in 2016.

The group's first guitarist, Henry Gross, became a solo performer. He scored a number-six Billboard hit single, "Shannon", in 1976.

Alan Cooper, the lead singer in the group's performance of "At the Hop" in the Woodstock film, went on to pursue an academic career. He taught religious studies at McMaster University in Hamilton, Ontario, for 10 years, then became a professor of Bible studies at Hebrew Union College-Jewish Institute of Religion in Cincinnati, and now serves as the Elaine Ravich Professor of Jewish Studies and provost at the Jewish Theological Seminary of America.

Jon "Bowzer" Bauman replaced Alan Cooper and became a recognizable member of the group as he taunted audiences while he flexed his muscles, burped, and spat in the direction of the bass player. In the 1980s, he had a brief career as a game show master of ceremonies. Starting in 1999 he worked to establish trademark protection for American musicians, under legislation titled Truth in Music Advertising. Bauman sought to prevent producers re-creating classic music groups without hiring the original musicians.

Elliot Cahn, the group's original rhythm guitar player and musical arranger, later became the first manager of Green Day.

Joe Witkin, who was replaced by Screamin' Scott Simon, was the original keyboard player and singer of "Teenager in Love" on their first album. Witkin left the band in 1970 to finish medical school, and subsequently moved to San Diego, California, in 1975 to do his internship and residency at the University of California, San Diego. He worked at Scripps Hospital East County from 1978 to 2000 as an ER physician, and held the same position at Sharp Grossmont Hospital in La Mesa until retiring in 2013. Witkin lives with his family in San Diego. He played with a 1950s/1960s show band The Corvettes in San Diego for 23 years.

Scott Powell is a specialist in orthopedic surgery and sports medicine. He performed on the TV show under the stage name "Santini" (another alias was "Captain Outrageous"). Powell left the band in 1980 and returned to Columbia to take premedical courses. He has been a member of the medical staff of US national soccer teams, and was the team physician for the Federation Women's National Team from 2005 to 2015. He is a clinical professor at the University of Southern California. While Powell was with Sha Na Na, he sang the bulk of the Elvis Presley revival songs.

Frederick "Denny" Greene left the group to pursue studies in law. After graduating from Yale Law School, he became the vice president of production and features at Columbia Pictures. He was a professor at the University of Dayton. Greene was known for his skilled dancing and sang the lead on "Tears on My Pillow", "Duke of Earl", and others. He died on September 5, 2015, after a brief illness.

Bruce "Bruno" Clarke became a professor of English at Texas Tech University in Lubbock, Texas.

Richard Joffe became a class action litigator for a law firm in New York City.

Dave Garrett ran the Long Island–based musical instrument amplifier company Earth Sound Research during the 1970s. A businessman, he resides in New York City.

Screamin' Scott Simon died from sinus cancer in Ojai, California on September 5, 2024, aged 75.

Johnny Contardo graduated from Brookline High School in 1969, then attended the Boston Conservatory of Music, studying voice, acting, and dance. He joined Sha Na Na in 1971. The television show Sha Na Na, aired from 1977 to 1981. In 1978 he appeared with it in the movie Grease as Johnny, of Johnny Casino and the Gamblers. His performance of the song "Those Magic Changes" was featured in the film and on its soundtrack. The same year he and the group had a cameo appearance in Sgt. Pepper's Lonely Hearts Club Band in the all-star finale recreation of the famous album cover. He left the group in 1983 to play Miguel Echevierra in Scarface. He went on to become a voice teacher and vocal coach at levels including professional singers.

== In pop culture ==
Besides having many of their songs featured on TV series and movies, Sha Na Na—and especially their omission from the Rock and Roll Hall of Fame—is a recurring source of humor on the Comedy Bang! Bang! podcast. Hot Dog, an occasional character on the show played by Andy Daly, frequently talks about his failed auditions to be a member of Sha Na Na. In episode 300, "Oh, Golly! You Devil", he announces that he has started his own band, Na Sha Sha, but in episode 400, "The War on Surfing", he says they have kicked him out.

== Discography ==
=== Albums ===
==== Studio and live albums ====
- Rock & Roll Is Here to Stay! [1969, US Billboard Album Chart 183] (re-released in 1973 with different cover)
- Sha Na Na [1971, US Billboard Album Chart 122] (Side A: Recorded live at Columbia University, New York and Side B: Recorded at Electric Lady Studios, New York)
- The Night Is Still Young [1972, US Billboard Album Chart 156]; certain releases omitted one of the songs ("Sleepin' on a Song")
- The Golden Age of Rock 'n' Roll [1973, US Billboard Album Chart 38, RIAA Certification: Gold] (Double LP, sides 2, 3 & 4 live recordings probably from 1972)
- From the Streets of New York (live) [1973, US Billboard Album Chart 140]
- Hot Sox [1974, US Billboard Album Chart 165]
- Sha Na Now [1975, US Billboard Album Chart 162]
- Rock 'n Roll Graffiti – Live in Japan [1975] (released in Japan in 1977, re-released in 1981)
- Rockin' in the 1980s [1980]
- Silly Songs [1981]
- 34th & Vine (1990) [eight songs]
- Live in Concert (late 1980s and early 1990s concerts) [199?] (one CD, two cassettes, or one DVD)
- Rock 'n Roll Dance Party (20 tracks in 1996; re-released with only 16 tracks in 1999)
- Then He Kissed Me (with Conny) [1999], Japan
- Live in Japan (with Conny) [2000], recorded in November 1999, Japan
- Rockin' Christmas [2002] (re-released in 2003 with different cover and one additional track: "Bad Christmas Eve")
- One More Saturday Night [2006]

==== Compilation albums ====
- The Best... [Buddah, 1976]
- The Best Of Sha Na Na [Arista, 1977]
- Yeah, Yeah, Yeah (Vol I, II, III, IV) [1985] (cassette) compilation series that includes two previously unreleased songs, "Da Doo Ron Ron" and "Mr. Bass Man"
- Rockin' and a Rollin' [1986] compilation (CD) that includes one previously unreleased song, "My Prayer"
- Havin' an Oldies Party with Sha Na Na [1991] compilation that includes one previously unreleased song, "Itsy Bitsy Teenie Weenie Yellow Polka Dot Bikini"
- The Sha Na Na 25th Anniversary Collection [1993] (20 songs including the eight tracks from 34th & Vine)
- 20 Classics Of Rock 'N' Roll (mid-1990s) (compilation cassette including a few previously unreleased recordings)
- Blue Moo: 17 Jukebox Hits from Way Back Never – various artist release (book and CD) containing one song ("Gorilla Song") by Sha Na Na [2008]
- 40th Anniversary – Collector's Edition (includes at least six previously unreleased performances) [2009]
- Rockin' Christmas: The Classic Christmas Collection (includes six new Christmas songs) [2011]
- Grease High School Hop – 25 Dance Songs of the '50s & '60s (compilation) [2013]
- Grease High School Hop Karaoke – 10 Sing-Along Favorites of the '50s & '60s (digital release) [2013]
- Rockin' Christmas: The Classic Christmas Collection (re-release that includes one new Christmas song: "Ugly Christmas Sweater") [2017]
- 50th Anniversary – Commemorative Edition – CD and LP – 12 never-before-released live concert cuts, three original bonus studio cuts, and expanded 16-page behind-the-scenes story [2019]

==== Soundtrack appearances ====
- Woodstock soundtrack [1970, US Billboard Album Chart 1] (includes "At the Hop" by Sha Na Na)
  - Sha Na Na also appears on the festival compilation albums Woodstock: Three Days of Peace and Music ("At the Hop"); Woodstock 40 Years On: Back To Yasgur's Farm ("Get a Job", "At the Hop", "Get a Job (reprise)"); Woodstock – Back to the Garden: 50th Anniversary Collection ("At the Hop"); Woodstock – Back to the Garden: 50th Anniversary Experience ("Get a Job", "Come Go with Me", "Silhouettes", "At the Hop", "Duke of Earl", "Get a Job (reprise)"); and Woodstock – Back to the Garden: The Definitive 50th Anniversary Archive
- Grease soundtrack [1978, US Billboard Album Chart 1] (includes six songs by Sha Na Na)

=== Singles ===
- "Remember Then" / "Rock & Roll Is Here To Stay" [1969, US Cash Box Singles Chart 114]
- "Payday" / "Portnoy" [1970]
- "Only One Song" / "Jail House Rock" [1971, US Billboard Singles Chart 110]
- "Top Forty" / "Great Balls Of Fire" [1971, US Billboard Singles Chart 84]
- "Eddie and the Evergreens" / "In the Still of the Night" (from The Night Is Still Young album) [1972]
- "Bounce in Your Buggy" / "Bless My Soul" [1972, US Cash Box Singles Chart 124]
- "Maybe I'm Old Fashioned" / "Stroll All Night" (longer version) [1974]
- "(Just Like) Romeo and Juliet" / "Circles Of Love" [1975, US Billboard Singles Chart 55]
- The Sha-Na-Netts – (Just Like) Romeo And Juliet (No Lead Vocals) / Flint-Niks – The Flint-Nik Rock [1975]
- "Smokin' Boogie" / "We're Still Smokin'" [1975]

=== Videos ===
- Sha Na Na Live in Germany (TV: Musikladen), 1973 (DVD, CD+VCD)
- Rock 'n Roll Concert & Party [1987] (VHS)

=== Other appearances ===
- Grunt: The Wrestling Movie (1985) -- includes "Wrestling Tonight" by Sha Na Na
- The Fall Guy TV series – "Beach Blanket Bounty" episode [1986] – several songs performed by Sha Na Na
