= Richard Nader =

American disc jockey (1940–2009)

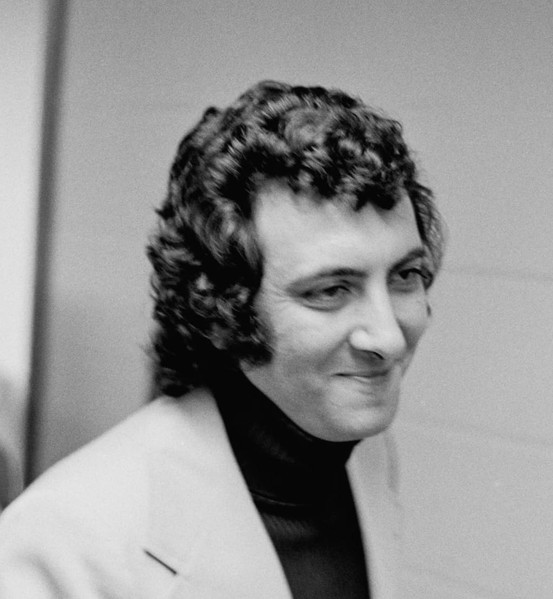
- Richard Nader in 1972
- Born: Richard Abi-Nader; October 30, 1940
- Died: December 1, 2009 (aged 69); Masontown, Pennsylvania, U.S.
- Occupations: disk jockey, concert promoter
- Years active: 1966–2009
- Known for: Rock and Roll Revival concert series

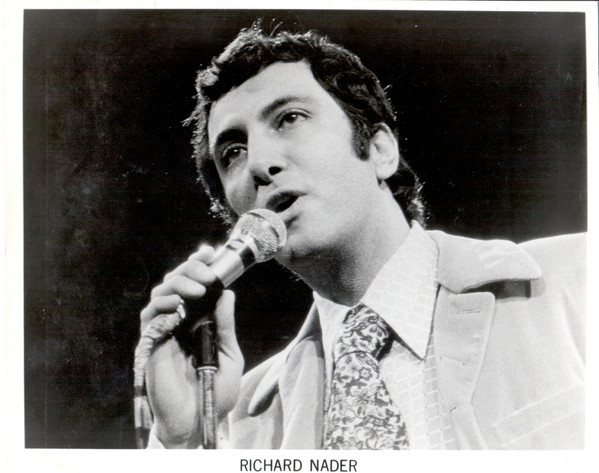
Promotional photo of Richard Nader

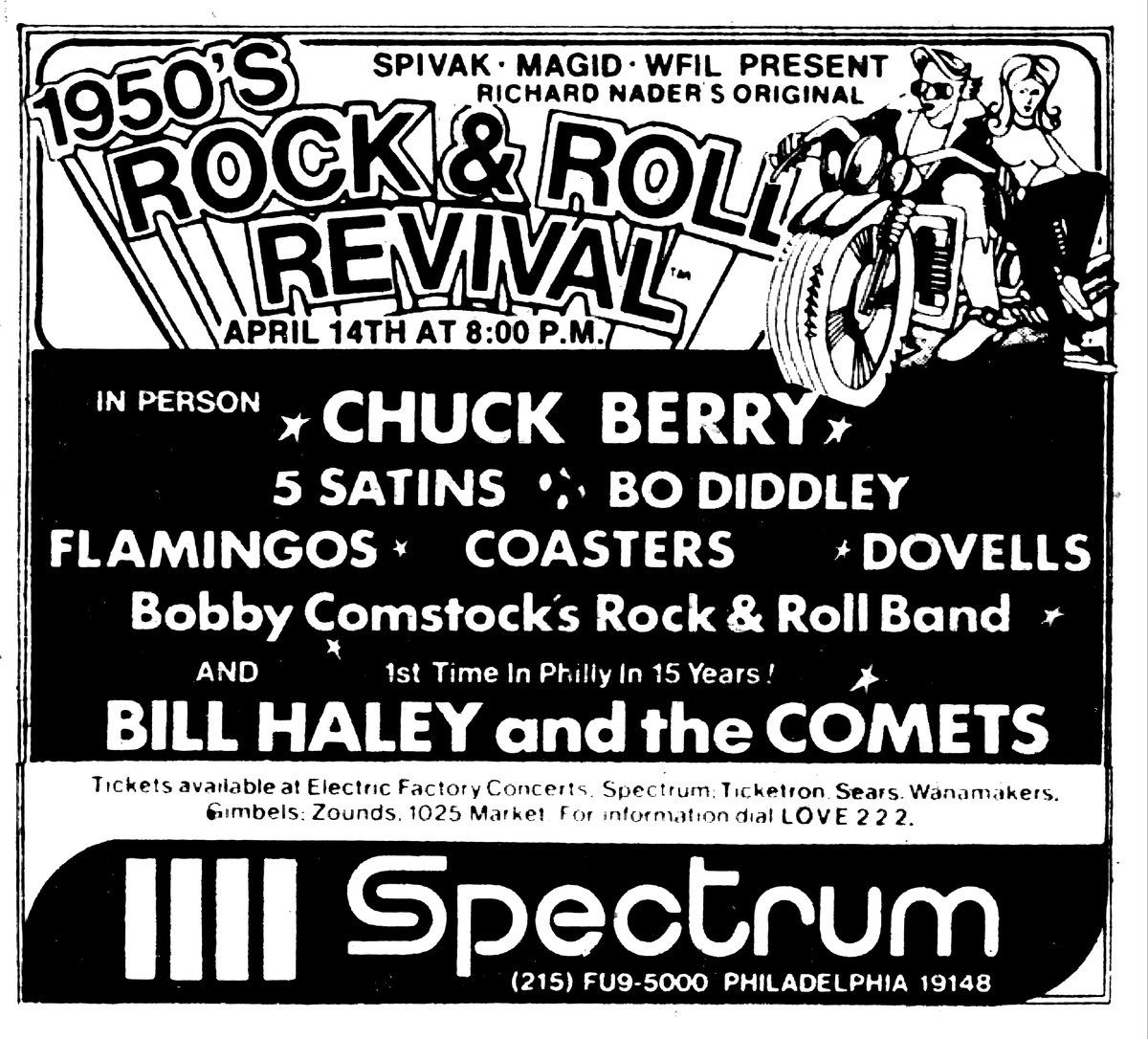
Richard Nader concert at The Spectrum advertisement

Richard Nader (October 30, 1940 – December 1, 2009) was a disk jockey and the entertainment promoter who pushed the concept of oldies mainstream, beginning with his first Rock and Roll Revival concert October 18, 1969, featuring Chuck Berry, The Platters, Bill Haley and the Comets (performing in the United States for the first time in over a decade), The Shirelles, The Coasters, Jimmy Clanton, and Sha Na Na.

Nader began as a disc jockey in high school, continuing in Korea over Armed Forces Radio while in the U.S. Army.

He joined the Premier Talent Agency where he arranged bookings for The Who, The Animals, Herman's Hermits, The Beau Brummels, and The Crazy World Of Arthur Brown. Frustrated with the British Invasion's impact on many of the artists he promoted, he left in order to begin promoting concerts featuring acts from the fifteen years of rock and roll.

Despite skepticism from the music industry and the musical artists themselves, Nader sold out nearly all his concerts and produced a documentary film based on the concerts, Let the Good Times Roll (1973). His efforts led directly to oldies radio in the 1980s and proved the commercial value of nostalgia.

== Artists featured at Richard Nader concerts ==
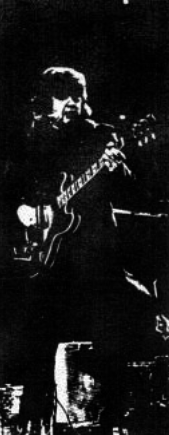
Bobby Comstock at Richard Nader concert

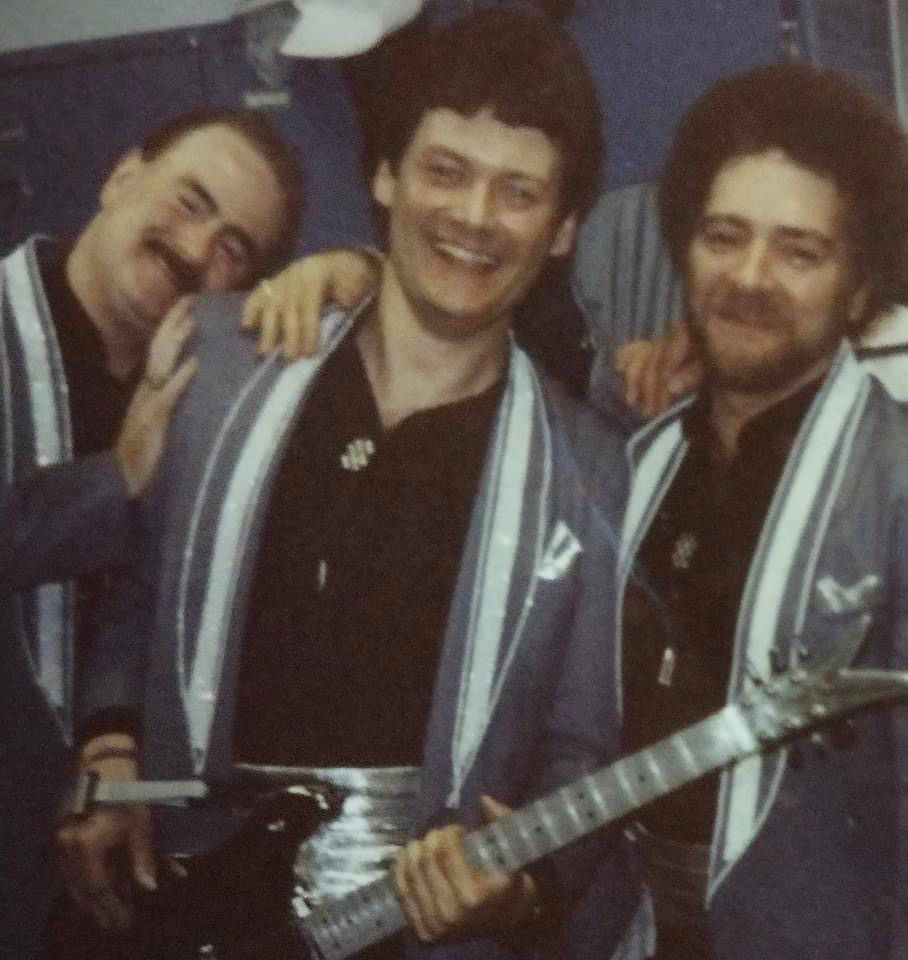
The Earls at Richard Nader concert
- The Angels
- Paul Anka
- Chuck Berry
- Willie Bobo
- Gary U.S. Bonds
- Jerry Butler
- Freddy Cannon
- The Capris
- The Chantels
- Ray Charles
- Chubby Checker
- The Chiffons
- Lou Christie
- Jimmy Clanton
- Dick Clark
- The Cleftones
- The Coasters
- Bobby Comstock
- Sam Cooke
- Joe Cuba
- The Dakotas
- Danny and the Juniors
- Bobby Darin
- Joey Dee and the Starliters
- Bo Diddley
- Dion and The Belmonts
- Fats Domino
- The Dovells
- The Drifters
- The Earls
- Duane Eddy
- Little Eva
- The Exciters
- The Five Satins
- The Flamingos
- Fabian Forte
- Connie Francis
- Gerry and the Pacemakers
- Lesley Gore
- Bill Haley and the Comets
- The Harptones
- Screamin' Jay Hawkins
- Herman’s Hermits
- Buddy Holly
- Ivory Joe Hunter
- Brenda Lee
- Bobby Lewis
- Jerry Lee Lewis
- Johnny Maestro of The Brooklyn Bridge
- Johnny Mathis
- Clyde McPhatter
- Bill Medley
- The Mindbenders
- The Moonglows
- Rick Nelson
- Roy Orbison
- The Orlons
- Eddie Palmieri
- The Penguins
- Carl Perkins
- The Platters
- Elvis Presley
- Lloyd Price
- Tito Puente
- Little Richard
- Smokey Robinson and the Miracles
- Ruby and the Romantics
- Bobby Rydell
- The Searchers
- Sha Na Na
- Del Shannon
- Shep and the Limelights
- The Shirelles
- Shirley and Lee
- Spirit of John Morgan
- The Supremes
- Little Anthony and the Imperials
- Ronnie Spector of The Ronettes
- The Skyliners
- The Del-Vikings
- The Mello-Kings
- Wolfman Jack
- Jay and the Americans
- Junior Walker
- Gino Washington
- Jackie Wilson
- Chuck Jackson
- Tommy James and the Shondells
- Frankie Valli and the Four Seasons
- Bobby Vee
- Billy Vera
- Gene Vincent
- Timi Yuro

== Richard Nader Filmography ==
- Let the Good Times Roll (1973)
- Murder at the Mardi Gras (1978)

== Richard Nader concerts ==
1950's Rock & Roll Revival

1950's Rock & Roll Revival
Date	Artists	Venue	Tour
October 18, 1969	Chuck Berry; The Platters; Bill Haley & The Comets; The Shirelles; The Coasters; Jimmy Clanton; Sha Na Na	Felt Forum at Madison Square Garden, New York City, NY	1950's Rock & Roll Revival
February 27, 1970	Bill Haley & The Comets; Bo Diddley; Jackie Wilson; The Coasters; The Drifters; The Shirelles	Detroit Olympia, Detroit, MI	1950's Rock & Roll Revival
March 20, 1970	Little Richard; Gene Vincent; Bo Diddley; Timi Yuro; The Five Satins; The Drifters; Ruby & the Romantics	Felt Forum at Madison Square Garden, New York City, NY	1950's Rock & Roll Revival
October 10, 1971	Chuck Berry; The Shirelles; The Coasters; Gary U.S. Bonds; Bo Diddley; Joey Dee & The Starliters	Richmond Coliseum, Richmond, VA	1950's Rock & Roll Revival
November 18, 1971	Bill Haley & The Comets; Chuck Berry; Bo Diddley; Gary U.S. Bonds; Bobby Comstock; The Dovells; The Shirelles	Spokane Coliseum, Spokane, WA	1950's Rock & Roll Revival
November 24, 1971	Bill Haley & The Comets; Chuck Berry; Bo Diddley; Gary U.S. Bonds; Bobby Comstock; The Dovells; The Shirelles	Sacramento Memorial Auditorium, Sacramento, CA	1950's Rock & Roll Revival
April 22, 1972	The Chiffons; Danny & The Juniors; The Crystals; Chuck Berry	State University of New York at Binghamton, Vestal, NY	1950's Rock & Roll Revival
July 14, 1972	Bill Haley & The Comets; Chubby Checker; Freddy Cannon; The Coasters	Southern Illinois University, Edwardsville, IL	1950's Rock & Roll Revival
October 22, 1972	Chuck Berry; Bo Diddley; The Coasters; The Chiffons; The Dovells; Freddy Cannon; Lloyd Price; Bobby Comstock	Cobo Arena, Detroit, MI	1950's Rock & Roll Revival
December 27, 1972	Jerry Lee Lewis; Lloyd Price; The Shirelles; The Drifters; The Skyliners; The Clovers; Bobby Comstock; Chubby Checker	Providence Civic Center, Providence, RI	1950's Rock & Roll Revival
March 2, 1973	Little Richard; Wilson Pickett; Chuck Jackson; The Chantels; The Flamingos; The Orlons; Bobby Day; Billy Vera; The Cleftones	Madison Square Garden, New York, NY	1950's Rock & Roll Revival
April 14, 1973	Chuck Berry; Bill Haley & The Comets; Bo Diddley; The Five Satins; The Flamingos; The Dovells; Bobby Comstock; The Coasters	The Spectrum, Philadelphia, PA	1950's Rock & Roll Revival
May 6, 1973	Little Richard; Chubby Checker; Bill Haley & The Comets; Bo Diddley; The Five Satins; Danny & The Juniors; Bobby Comstock	Buffalo Memorial Auditorium, Buffalo, NY	1950's Rock & Roll Revival
May 11, 1973	Bill Haley & The Comets; Little Richard; Bo Diddley; Chuck Berry; Chubby Checker; The Coasters; Danny & The Juniors; Dion & The Belmonts; Brenda Lee; The Shirelles	Nassau Veterans Memorial Coliseum, Uniondale, NY	1950's Rock & Roll Revival
May 13, 1973	Bill Haley & The Comets; Little Richard; Bobby Comstock; Bo Diddley; Danny & The Juniors; The Crystals	Utica Memorial Auditorium, Utica, NY	1950's Rock & Roll Revival
May 18, 1973	Bill Haley & The Comets; Little Richard; Bo Diddley; Chuck Berry; Chubby Checker; The Coasters; Danny & The Juniors; Dion & The Belmonts; Brenda Lee; The Shirelles	Cobo Arena, Detroit, MI	1950's Rock & Roll Revival
May 19, 1973	Bill Haley & The Comets; Little Richard; Bo Diddley; Chuck Berry; Chubby Checker; The Coasters; Danny & The Juniors; Dion & The Belmonts; Brenda Lee; The Shirelles	Maple Leaf Gardens, Toronto, ON	1950's Rock & Roll Revival
June 24, 1973	Bill Haley & The Comets; Bo Diddley; Chuck Berry; The Coasters; Danny & The Juniors	Nashville Fairgrounds Speedway, Nashville, TN	1950's Rock & Roll Revival
September 30, 1973	Chuck Berry; Jerry Lee Lewis; The Shirelles; The Platters; The Dovells; Shirley & Lee; The Moonglows; Bobby Comstock	The Spectrum, Philadelphia, PA	1950's Rock & Roll Revival
March 23, 1974	Chuck Berry; Jackie Wilson; The Coasters; The Angels; Johnny Maestro; Chubby Checker	Civic Arena, Pittsburgh, PA	1950's Rock & Roll Revival
May 11, 1974	Lloyd Price; The Orlons; Jimmy Clanton; Lee Andrews & the Hearts; The Dovells	Valley Forge Music Fair, Devon, PA	1950's Rock & Roll Revival

Rock & Roll Revival/Spectacular Vol.

Rock & Roll Revival/Spectacular Vol.
Date	Artists	Venue	Tour
February 7, 1971	Jerry Lee Lewis; Bill Haley & The Comets; Jay & The Americans; The Five Satins; The Skyliners; Freddy Cannon; The Dovells; Carl Perkins; The Angels; Ruby & The Romantics; Bobby Comstock	Madison Square Garden, New York City, NY	Rock & Roll Revival Vol. V
June 11, 1971	Jerry Lee Lewis; Bo Diddley; The Drifters; Duane Eddy; Little Eva; The Four Seasons; Jay & the Americans; The Crystals; Bobby Lewis; Bobby Comstock; The Del-Vikings	Madison Square Garden, New York City, NY	Rock & Roll Revival Vol. VI
October 15, 1971	Bo Diddley; Rick Nelson; Chuck Berry; Bobby Comstock; Bobby Rydell; The Shirelles; The Coasters; The Chiffons; Gary U.S. Bonds	Madison Square Garden, New York City, NY	Rock & Roll Revival Vol. VII
June 2, 1972	The Cleftones; Little Richard; Lloyd Price; Danny & The Juniors; Dion & The Belmonts; The Exciters; Shirley & Lee	Madison Square Garden, New York City, NY	Rock & Roll Spectacular Vol. IX
December 29, 1972	Jerry Lee Lewis; Lloyd Price; The Drifters; The Shirelles; Johnny Maestro; The Skyliners; The Clovers; Roy Orbison	Madison Square Garden, New York City, NY	Rock & Roll Spectacular Vol. XI
June 1, 1973	Chuck Berry; Bo Diddley; Chubby Checker; The Shirelles; The Five Satins; Danny & The Juniors; Brenda Lee	Madison Square Garden, New York City, NY	Rock & Roll Spectacular Vol. 13
March 14, 1975	Jerry Lee Lewis; Johnny Maestro; Lesley Gore; The Belmonts; The Drifters; Bo Diddley	Madison Square Garden, New York City, NY	Rock & Roll Spectacular Vol. 18
October 3, 1975	Bobby Comstock; Bobby Rydell; Chuck Berry; Jay & The Americans; Jerry Lee Lewis; Lloyd Price; Sha Na Na; The Coasters; The Five Satins	Madison Square Garden, New York City, NY	Rock & Roll Spectacular Vol. 19
March 12, 1976	Fats Domino; Little Anthony & The Imperials; Lesley Gore; Jay & The Americans; Johnny Maestro; Sha Na Na	Madison Square Garden, New York City, NY	Rock & Roll Spectacular Vol. 20
October 15, 1976	Chuck Berry; Bo Diddley; The Shirelles; The Drifters; The Coasters; The Five Satins; Sha Na Na	Madison Square Garden, New York City, NY	Rock & Roll Spectacular Vol. 21
March 4, 1977	The Supremes; Jay & The Americans; Lloyd Price; The Duprees; Johnny Maestro; Dion DiMucci	Madison Square Garden, New York City, NY	Rock & Roll Spectacular Vol. 22
March 3, 1978	Sha Na Na; Jay & The Americans; The Four Tops; Tommy James & The Shondells	Madison Square Garden, New York City, NY	Rock & Roll Spectacular Vol. 24
October 20, 1978	Jerry Lee Lewis; Bo Diddley; Bill Medley; Johnny Maestro; Martha Reeves & The Vandellas; Ronnie Spector; Wolfman Jack	Madison Square Garden, New York City, NY	Rock & Roll Spectacular Vol. 25

The 1960's British Rock Invasion Revisited

The 1960's British Rock Invasion Revisited
Date	Artists	Venue	Tour
June 25, 1973	The Searchers; Gerry and the Pacemakers; Herman’s Hermits; The Mindbenders; The Dakotas	Saratoga Performing Arts Center, Saratoga Springs, NY	The 1960's British Rock Invasion Revisited
June 27, 1973	The Searchers; Gerry and the Pacemakers; Herman’s Hermits; The Mindbenders; The Dakotas	Madison Square Garden, New York, NY	The 1960's British Rock Invasion Revisited
June 28, 1973	The Searchers; Gerry and the Pacemakers; Herman’s Hermits; The Mindbenders; The Dakotas	Maple Leaf Gardens, Toronto, ON	The 1960's British Rock Invasion Revisited
June 29, 1973	The Searchers; Gerry and the Pacemakers; Herman’s Hermits; The Mindbenders; The Dakotas	Springfield Civic Center, Springfield, MA	The 1960's British Rock Invasion Revisited
June 30, 1973	The Searchers; Gerry and the Pacemakers; Herman’s Hermits; The Mindbenders; The Dakotas	Providence Civic Center, Providence, RI	The 1960's British Rock Invasion Revisited
July 1, 1973	The Searchers; Gerry and the Pacemakers; Herman’s Hermits; The Mindbenders; The Dakotas	Cape Cod Coliseum, South Yarmouth, MA	The 1960's British Rock Invasion Revisited
July 3, 1973	The Searchers; Gerry and the Pacemakers; Herman’s Hermits; The Mindbenders; The Dakotas	Steel Pier, Atlantic City, NJ	The 1960's British Rock Invasion Revisited
July 6, 1973	The Searchers; Gerry and the Pacemakers; Herman’s Hermits; The Mindbenders; The Dakotas	Merriweather Post Pavilion, Columbia, MD	The 1960's British Rock Invasion Revisited
July 7, 1973	The Searchers; Gerry and the Pacemakers; Herman’s Hermits; The Mindbenders; The Dakotas	Yale Bowl, New Haven, CT	The 1960's British Rock Invasion Revisited
July 9, 1973	Herman’s Hermits; Gerry & The Pacemakers; Billy J. Kramer; Wayne Fontana & The Mindbenders; The Searchers	Pine Knob Music Theatre, Clarkston, MI	The 1960's British Rock Invasion Revisited
July 10, 1973	The Searchers; Gerry and the Pacemakers; Herman’s Hermits; The Mindbenders; The Dakotas	Kansas City Municipal Auditorium, Kansas City, KS	The 1960's British Rock Invasion Revisited
July 11, 1973	The Searchers; Gerry and the Pacemakers; Herman’s Hermits; The Mindbenders; The Dakotas	Minneapolis, MN	The 1960's British Rock Invasion Revisited
July 12, 1973	The Searchers; Gerry and the Pacemakers; Herman’s Hermits; The Mindbenders; The Dakotas	Sioux Falls, SD	The 1960's British Rock Invasion Revisited
July 13, 1973	The Searchers; Gerry and the Pacemakers; Herman’s Hermits; The Mindbenders; The Dakotas	Los Angeles Forum, Inglewood, CA	The 1960's British Rock Invasion Revisited
July 15, 1973	The Searchers; Gerry and the Pacemakers; Herman’s Hermits; The Mindbenders; The Dakotas	Cow Palace, Daly City, CA	The 1960's British Rock Invasion Revisited
July 16, 1973	The Searchers; Gerry and the Pacemakers; Herman’s Hermits; The Mindbenders; The Dakotas	Winnipeg Arena, Winnipeg, MB	The 1960's British Rock Invasion Revisited
July 17, 1973	The Searchers; Gerry and the Pacemakers; Herman’s Hermits; The Mindbenders; The Dakotas	Bismarck Civic Center, Bismarck, ND	The 1960's British Rock Invasion Revisited
July 18, 1973	The Searchers; Gerry and the Pacemakers; Herman’s Hermits; The Mindbenders; The Dakotas	Blossom Music Center, Cuyahoga Falls, OH	The 1960's British Rock Invasion Revisited
July 19, 1973	The Searchers; Gerry and the Pacemakers; Herman’s Hermits; The Mindbenders; The Dakotas	Summerfest Grounds, Milwaukee, WI	The 1960's British Rock Invasion Revisited
July 20, 1973	The Searchers; Gerry and the Pacemakers; Herman’s Hermits; The Mindbenders; The Dakotas	Columbus, OH	The 1960's British Rock Invasion Revisited
July 21, 1973	The Searchers; Gerry and the Pacemakers; Herman’s Hermits; The Mindbenders; The Dakotas	Cedar Rapids, IA	The 1960's British Rock Invasion Revisited
July 22, 1973	The Searchers; Gerry and the Pacemakers; Herman’s Hermits; The Mindbenders; The Dakotas	St. Louis, MO	The 1960's British Rock Invasion Revisited

Richard Nader's Summer Rock & Roll Spectacular

Richard Nader's Summer Rock & Roll Spectacular
Date	Artists	Venue	Tour
July 20, 1982	Rick Nelson; Bo Diddley; Danny & The Juniors; The Chiffons; Junior Walker	Cobo Arena, Detroit, MI	Richard Nader's Summer Rock & Roll Spectacular
July 7, 1984	Lesley Gore; Del Shannon; Lou Christie; Danny & The Juniors; The Chiffons	Meadow Brook Amphitheatre, Rochester Hills, MI	Richard Nader's Rock & Roll Summer Spectacular

== Mervyn Conn concerts ==
1950's Rock & Roll Revival

1950's Rock & Roll Revival
Date	Artists	Venue	Tour
June 2, 1970	Bill Haley & The Comets; Chuck Berry; Bo Diddley; The Shirelles; Gary U.S. Bonds; Spirit of John Morgan	Belle Vue, Manchester	1950's Rock & Roll Revival
June 3, 1970	Bill Haley & The Comets; Chuck Berry; Bo Diddley; The Shirelles; Gary U.S. Bonds; Spirit of John Morgan	Wembley Empire Pool, London	1950's Rock & Roll Revival

International Festival of Country Music

International Festival of Country Music
Date	Artists	Venue	Tour
April 13, 1974	Bill Anderson; Bill Monroe & The Bluegrass Boys; Jeanne Pruett; Kathie Kay; Kitty Wells; Philomena Begley; Ray Lynam; Terry Stafford; Tompall Glaser; Wanda Jackson	Wembley Empire Pool, London	International Festival of Country Music
April 14, 1974	Bill Anderson; Mary Lou Turner; David Rodgers; Johnny Rodriguez; Larry Cunningham; Mac Wiseman & The Country Boys; Miki & Griff; The Oak Ridge Boys	Wembley Empire Pool, London	International Festival of Country Music
March 29, 1975	Country Fever; Tumbleweeds; Vernon Oxford; Marty Robbins; Ray Lynam; Philomena Begley; Johnny Carver; Mac Wiseman; Molly Bee; George Hamilton IV; Miki & Griff	Wembley Empire Pool, London	International Festival of Country Music
April 19, 1976	Country Gazette; The Dillards; John Hartford; Carl Perkins; The Ozark Mountain Daredevils; Rick Nelson & The Stone Canyon Band	Wembley Empire Pool, London	International Festival of Country Music
April 9, 1977	Carl Perkins; Eagles; Loretta Lynn; The Oak Ridge Boys	Wembley Empire Pool, London	International Festival of Country Music
April 10, 1977	Billie Jo Spears; Don Williams	Wembley Empire Pool, London	International Festival of Country Music
April 11, 1977	Emmylou Harris; The Hot Band	Wembley Empire Pool, London	International Festival of Country Music
