= Mervyn Conn =

British music executive

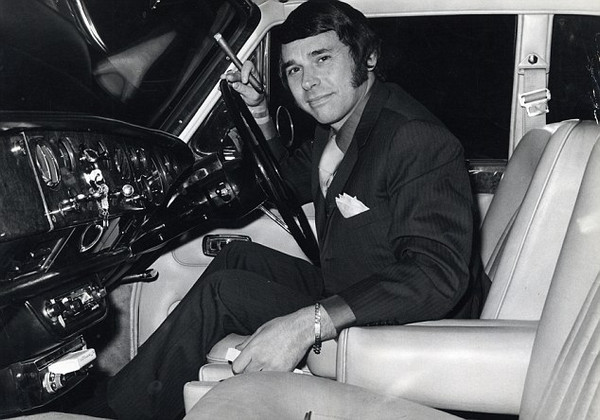
- Born: 5 February 1934 (age 92)
- Occupation: Concert promoter
- Known for: Managing pop music tours in the United Kingdom of famous artists; Director of the Melody Maker Wembley Arena Shows; Launching the "International Festivals of Country Music" Tours; Touring theatre productions

Mervyn Conn (born 5 February 1934) is a British music promoter and entrepreneur.

== Biography ==
=== Early life and career ===
Conn born in 1934 started work in the fashion industry, but by the early 1960s, with the help of his cousin, the comedian Bernie Winters, he had begun running a club, Romano's, in Gerrard Street in Soho, London. He worked closely with agent Joe Collins (the father of Joan and Jackie Collins), and staged the first Beatles Christmas Shows in 1963.

== Management career ==
He then managed many of the major pop music touring shows in the UK, including those headlined by such bands and musicians as P.J. Proby, The Byrds, Johnny Cash, Billie Jo Spears, Chubby Checker, Marlene Dietrich, Sarah Vaughan, Chuck Berry, Peggy Lee, the Red Army Ensemble and many more. He also directed the Melody Maker Pop Shows held at Wembley Arena in the 1960s.

He then launched the annual International Festivals of Country Music held at the same venue between 1969 and 1991. The shows were later taken into Europe, and featured such stars as Johnny Cash, Dolly Parton, Tammy Wynette, Billie Jo Spears, and Jerry Lee Lewis.

More recently he has been responsible for major touring shows including Annie starring his own daughter, and Three Steps To Heaven.

== Artists featured at Mervyn Conn concerts ==
- Molly Bee
- Philomena Begley
- Chuck Berry
- Gary U.S. Bonds
- The Byrds
- Johnny Carver
- Johnny Cash
- Chubby Checker
- Bo Diddley
- Marlene Dietrich
- The Dillards
- Country Fever
- Country Gazette
- Bill Haley and the Comets
- George Hamilton IV
- John Hartford
- Wanda Jackson
- George Jones
- Peggy Lee
- Jerry Lee Lewis
- Ray Lynam
- Miki & Griff
- Rick Nelson & The Stone Canyon Band
- Vernon Oxford
- The Ozark Mountain Daredevils
- Carl Perkins
- P.J. Proby
- Red Army Ensemble
- Marty Robbins
- The Shirelles
- Billie Jo Spears
- Spirit of John Morgan
- Tumbleweeds
- Sarah Vaughan
- Boxcar Willie
- Mac Wiseman

== Mervyn Conn concerts ==
1950's Rock & Roll Revival

1950's Rock & Roll Revival
Date	Artists	Venue	Tour
June 2, 1970	Bill Haley & The Comets; Chuck Berry; Bo Diddley; The Shirelles; Gary U.S. Bonds; Spirit of John Morgan	Belle Vue, Manchester	1950's Rock & Roll Revival
June 3, 1970	Bill Haley & The Comets; Chuck Berry; Bo Diddley; The Shirelles; Gary U.S. Bonds; Spirit of John Morgan	Wembley Empire Pool, London	1950's Rock & Roll Revival

International Festival of Country Music

International Festival of Country Music
Date	Artists	Venue	Tour
April 13, 1974	Bill Anderson; Bill Monroe & The Bluegrass Boys; Jeanne Pruett; Kathie Kay; Kitty Wells; Philomena Begley; Ray Lynam; Terry Stafford; Tompall Glaser; Wanda Jackson	Wembley Empire Pool, London	International Festival of Country Music
April 14, 1974	Bill Anderson; Mary Lou Turner; David Rodgers; Johnny Rodriguez; Larry Cunningham; Mac Wiseman & The Country Boys; Miki & Griff; The Oak Ridge Boys	Wembley Empire Pool, London	International Festival of Country Music
March 29, 1975	Country Fever; Tumbleweeds; Vernon Oxford; Marty Robbins; Ray Lynam; Philomena Begley; Johnny Carver; Mac Wiseman; Molly Bee; George Hamilton IV; Miki & Griff	Wembley Empire Pool, London	International Festival of Country Music
April 19, 1976	Country Gazette; The Dillards; John Hartford; Carl Perkins; The Ozark Mountain Daredevils; Rick Nelson & The Stone Canyon Band	Wembley Empire Pool, London	International Festival of Country Music
April 9, 1977	Carl Perkins; Eagles; Loretta Lynn; The Oak Ridge Boys	Wembley Empire Pool, London	International Festival of Country Music
April 10, 1977	Billie Jo Spears; Don Williams	Wembley Empire Pool, London	International Festival of Country Music
April 11, 1977	Emmylou Harris; The Hot Band	Wembley Empire Pool, London	International Festival of Country Music

== Richard Nader concerts ==
1950's Rock & Roll Revival

1950's Rock & Roll Revival
Date	Artists	Venue	Tour
October 18, 1969	Chuck Berry; The Platters; Bill Haley & The Comets; The Shirelles; The Coasters; Jimmy Clanton; Sha Na Na	Felt Forum at Madison Square Garden, New York City, NY	1950's Rock & Roll Revival
February 27, 1970	Bill Haley & The Comets; Bo Diddley; Jackie Wilson; The Coasters; The Drifters; The Shirelles	Detroit Olympia, Detroit, MI	1950's Rock & Roll Revival
March 20, 1970	Little Richard; Gene Vincent; Bo Diddley; Timi Yuro; The Five Satins; The Drifters; Ruby & the Romantics	Felt Forum at Madison Square Garden, New York City, NY	1950's Rock & Roll Revival
October 10, 1971	Chuck Berry; The Shirelles; The Coasters; Gary U.S. Bonds; Bo Diddley; Joey Dee & The Starliters	Richmond Coliseum, Richmond, VA	1950's Rock & Roll Revival
November 18, 1971	Bill Haley & The Comets; Chuck Berry; Bo Diddley; Gary U.S. Bonds; Bobby Comstock; The Dovells; The Shirelles	Spokane Coliseum, Spokane, WA	1950's Rock & Roll Revival
November 24, 1971	Bill Haley & The Comets; Chuck Berry; Bo Diddley; Gary U.S. Bonds; Bobby Comstock; The Dovells; The Shirelles	Sacramento Memorial Auditorium, Sacramento, CA	1950's Rock & Roll Revival
April 22, 1972	The Chiffons; Danny & The Juniors; The Crystals; Chuck Berry	State University of New York at Binghamton, Vestal, NY	1950's Rock & Roll Revival
July 14, 1972	Bill Haley & The Comets; Chubby Checker; Freddy Cannon; The Coasters	Southern Illinois University, Edwardsville, IL	1950's Rock & Roll Revival
October 22, 1972	Chuck Berry; Bo Diddley; The Coasters; The Chiffons; The Dovells; Freddy Cannon; Lloyd Price; Bobby Comstock	Cobo Arena, Detroit, MI	1950's Rock & Roll Revival
December 27, 1972	Jerry Lee Lewis; Lloyd Price; The Shirelles; The Drifters; The Skyliners; The Clovers; Bobby Comstock; Chubby Checker	Providence Civic Center, Providence, RI	1950's Rock & Roll Revival
March 2, 1973	Little Richard; Wilson Pickett; Chuck Jackson; The Chantels; The Flamingos; The Orlons; Bobby Day; Billy Vera; The Cleftones	Madison Square Garden, New York, NY	1950's Rock & Roll Revival
April 14, 1973	Chuck Berry; Bill Haley & The Comets; Bo Diddley; The Five Satins; The Flamingos; The Dovells; Bobby Comstock; The Coasters	The Spectrum, Philadelphia, PA	1950's Rock & Roll Revival
May 6, 1973	Little Richard; Chubby Checker; Bill Haley & The Comets; Bo Diddley; The Five Satins; Danny & The Juniors; Bobby Comstock	Buffalo Memorial Auditorium, Buffalo, NY	1950's Rock & Roll Revival
May 11, 1973	Bill Haley & The Comets; Little Richard; Bo Diddley; Chuck Berry; Chubby Checker; The Coasters; Danny & The Juniors; Dion & The Belmonts; Brenda Lee; The Shirelles	Nassau Veterans Memorial Coliseum, Uniondale, NY	1950's Rock & Roll Revival
May 13, 1973	Bill Haley & The Comets; Little Richard; Bobby Comstock; Bo Diddley; Danny & The Juniors; The Crystals	Utica Memorial Auditorium, Utica, NY	1950's Rock & Roll Revival
May 18, 1973	Bill Haley & The Comets; Little Richard; Bo Diddley; Chuck Berry; Chubby Checker; The Coasters; Danny & The Juniors; Dion & The Belmonts; Brenda Lee; The Shirelles	Cobo Arena, Detroit, MI	1950's Rock & Roll Revival
June 24, 1973	Bill Haley & The Comets; Bo Diddley; Chuck Berry; The Coasters; Danny & The Juniors	Nashville Fairgrounds Speedway, Nashville, TN	1950's Rock & Roll Revival
September 30, 1973	Chuck Berry; Jerry Lee Lewis; The Shirelles; The Platters; The Dovells; Shirley & Lee; The Moonglows; Bobby Comstock	The Spectrum, Philadelphia, PA	1950's Rock & Roll Revival
March 23, 1974	Chuck Berry; Jackie Wilson; The Coasters; The Angels; Johnny Maestro; Chubby Checker	Civic Arena, Pittsburgh, PA	1950's Rock & Roll Revival
May 11, 1974	Lloyd Price; The Orlons; Jimmy Clanton; Lee Andrews & the Hearts; The Dovells	Valley Forge Music Fair, Devon, PA	1950's Rock & Roll Revival

Rock & Roll Revival/Spectacular Vol.

Rock & Roll Revival/Spectacular Vol.
Date	Artists	Venue	Tour
February 7, 1971	Jerry Lee Lewis; Bill Haley & The Comets; Jay & The Americans; The Five Satins; The Skyliners; Freddy Cannon; The Dovells; Carl Perkins; The Angels; Ruby & The Romantics; Bobby Comstock	Madison Square Garden, New York City, NY	Rock & Roll Revival Vol. V
June 11, 1971	Jerry Lee Lewis; Bo Diddley; The Drifters; Duane Eddy; Little Eva; The Four Seasons; Jay & the Americans; The Crystals; Bobby Lewis; Bobby Comstock; The Del-Vikings	Madison Square Garden, New York City, NY	Rock & Roll Revival Vol. VI
October 15, 1971	Bo Diddley; Rick Nelson; Chuck Berry; Bobby Comstock; Bobby Rydell; The Shirelles; The Coasters; The Chiffons; Gary U.S. Bonds	Madison Square Garden, New York City, NY	Rock & Roll Revival Vol. VII
June 2, 1972	The Cleftones; Little Richard; Lloyd Price; Danny & The Juniors; Dion & The Belmonts; The Exciters; Shirley & Lee	Madison Square Garden, New York City, NY	Rock & Roll Spectacular Vol. IX
December 29, 1972	Jerry Lee Lewis; Lloyd Price; The Drifters; The Shirelles; Johnny Maestro; The Skyliners; The Clovers; Roy Orbison	Madison Square Garden, New York City, NY	Rock & Roll Spectacular Vol. XI
June 1, 1973	Chuck Berry; Bo Diddley; Chubby Checker; The Shirelles; The Five Satins; Danny & The Juniors; Brenda Lee	Madison Square Garden, New York City, NY	Rock & Roll Spectacular Vol. XIII
January 5, 1974	Little Richard; Danny & The Juniors	Madison Square Garden, New York City, NY	Rock & Roll Spectacular Vol. XIV
March 14, 1975	Jerry Lee Lewis; Lesley Gore; The Belmonts; The Drifters; Bo Diddley	Madison Square Garden, New York City, NY	Rock & Roll Spectacular Vol. XVIII
October 3, 1975	Bobby Comstock; Bobby Rydell; Chuck Berry; Jay & The Americans; Jerry Lee Lewis; Lloyd Price; Sha Na Na; The Coasters; The Five Satins	Madison Square Garden, New York City, NY	Rock & Roll Spectacular Vol. XIX
March 12, 1976	Fats Domino; Little Anthony & The Imperials; Lesley Gore; Jay & The Americans; Johnny Maestro; Sha Na Na	Madison Square Garden, New York City, NY	Rock & Roll Spectacular Vol. XX
March 3, 1978	Sha Na Na; Jay & The Americans; The Four Tops; Tommy James & The Shondells	Madison Square Garden, New York City, NY	Rock & Roll Spectacular Vol. 24

The 1960's British Rock Invasion Revisited

The 1960's British Rock Invasion Revisited
Date	Artists	Venue	Tour
June 25, 1973	The Searchers; Gerry and the Pacemakers; Herman’s Hermits; The Mindbenders; The Dakotas	Saratoga Performing Arts Center, Saratoga Springs, NY	The 1960's British Rock Invasion Revisited
June 27, 1973	The Searchers; Gerry and the Pacemakers; Herman’s Hermits; The Mindbenders; The Dakotas	Madison Square Garden, New York, NY	The 1960's British Rock Invasion Revisited
June 28, 1973	The Searchers; Gerry and the Pacemakers; Herman’s Hermits; The Mindbenders; The Dakotas	Maple Leaf Gardens, Toronto, ON	The 1960's British Rock Invasion Revisited
June 29, 1973	The Searchers; Gerry and the Pacemakers; Herman’s Hermits; The Mindbenders; The Dakotas	Springfield Civic Center, Springfield, MA	The 1960's British Rock Invasion Revisited
June 30, 1973	The Searchers; Gerry and the Pacemakers; Herman’s Hermits; The Mindbenders; The Dakotas	Providence Civic Center, Providence, RI	The 1960's British Rock Invasion Revisited
July 1, 1973	The Searchers; Gerry and the Pacemakers; Herman’s Hermits; The Mindbenders; The Dakotas	Cape Cod Coliseum, South Yarmouth, MA	The 1960's British Rock Invasion Revisited
July 3, 1973	The Searchers; Gerry and the Pacemakers; Herman’s Hermits; The Mindbenders; The Dakotas	Steel Pier, Atlantic City, NJ	The 1960's British Rock Invasion Revisited
July 6, 1973	The Searchers; Gerry and the Pacemakers; Herman’s Hermits; The Mindbenders; The Dakotas	Merriweather Post Pavilion, Columbia, MD	The 1960's British Rock Invasion Revisited
July 7, 1973	The Searchers; Gerry and the Pacemakers; Herman’s Hermits; The Mindbenders; The Dakotas	Yale Bowl, New Haven, CT	The 1960's British Rock Invasion Revisited
July 9, 1973	Herman’s Hermits; Gerry & The Pacemakers; Billy J. Kramer; Wayne Fontana & The Mindbenders; The Searchers	Pine Knob Music Theatre, Clarkston, MI	The 1960's British Rock Invasion Revisited
July 10, 1973	The Searchers; Gerry and the Pacemakers; Herman’s Hermits; The Mindbenders; The Dakotas	Kansas City Municipal Auditorium, Kansas City, KS	The 1960's British Rock Invasion Revisited
July 11, 1973	The Searchers; Gerry and the Pacemakers; Herman’s Hermits; The Mindbenders; The Dakotas	Minneapolis, MN	The 1960's British Rock Invasion Revisited
July 12, 1973	The Searchers; Gerry and the Pacemakers; Herman’s Hermits; The Mindbenders; The Dakotas	Sioux Falls, SD	The 1960's British Rock Invasion Revisited
July 13, 1973	The Searchers; Gerry and the Pacemakers; Herman’s Hermits; The Mindbenders; The Dakotas	Los Angeles Forum, Inglewood, CA	The 1960's British Rock Invasion Revisited
July 15, 1973	The Searchers; Gerry and the Pacemakers; Herman’s Hermits; The Mindbenders; The Dakotas	Cow Palace, Daly City, CA	The 1960's British Rock Invasion Revisited
July 16, 1973	The Searchers; Gerry and the Pacemakers; Herman’s Hermits; The Mindbenders; The Dakotas	Winnipeg Arena, Winnipeg, MB	The 1960's British Rock Invasion Revisited
July 17, 1973	The Searchers; Gerry and the Pacemakers; Herman’s Hermits; The Mindbenders; The Dakotas	Bismarck Civic Center, Bismarck, ND	The 1960's British Rock Invasion Revisited
July 18, 1973	The Searchers; Gerry and the Pacemakers; Herman’s Hermits; The Mindbenders; The Dakotas	Blossom Music Center, Cuyahoga Falls, OH	The 1960's British Rock Invasion Revisited
July 19, 1973	The Searchers; Gerry and the Pacemakers; Herman’s Hermits; The Mindbenders; The Dakotas	Summerfest Grounds, Milwaukee, WI	The 1960's British Rock Invasion Revisited
July 20, 1973	The Searchers; Gerry and the Pacemakers; Herman’s Hermits; The Mindbenders; The Dakotas	Columbus, OH	The 1960's British Rock Invasion Revisited
July 21, 1973	The Searchers; Gerry and the Pacemakers; Herman’s Hermits; The Mindbenders; The Dakotas	Cedar Rapids, IA	The 1960's British Rock Invasion Revisited
July 22, 1973	The Searchers; Gerry and the Pacemakers; Herman’s Hermits; The Mindbenders; The Dakotas	St. Louis, MO	The 1960's British Rock Invasion Revisited

Richard Nader's Summer Rock & Roll Spectacular

Richard Nader's Summer Rock & Roll Spectacular
Date	Artists	Venue	Tour
July 20, 1982	Rick Nelson; Bo Diddley; Danny & The Juniors; The Chiffons; Junior Walker	Cobo Arena, Detroit, MI	Richard Nader's Summer Rock & Roll Spectacular
July 7, 1984	Lesley Gore; Del Shannon; Lou Christie; Danny & The Juniors; The Chiffons	Meadow Brook Amphitheatre, Rochester Hills, MI	Richard Nader's Rock & Roll Summer Spectacular

== Personal life ==
In 1989, Conn was convicted of a serious sexual assault on his 19-year-old receptionist and was sentenced to eight weeks in prison. In July 2014, he was arrested at Gatwick airport in connection with an alleged historic rape and sexual assault.

In October 2016 Mervyn Conn, then 82, was convicted of historic offences of 2 rapes and 1 sexual assault, and was sentenced to 15 years imprisonment with a minimum of 7 years before parole can be considered .

== Memoirs ==
In 2010 Conn published an autobiography, Mr Music Man: My Life in Showbiz.
