= Rollee McGill =

- Birth name: Rollee N. McGill
- Born: December 29, 1931; Kingstree, South Carolina, United States
- Died: October 11, 2000 (aged 68); Philadelphia, Pennsylvania, U.S.
- Genres: Rhythm and blues
- Occupation(s): Singer, musician
- Instrument(s): Vocals, saxophone
- Years active: 1950s–1980s
- Labels: Piney, Mercury, Junior

Rollee N. McGill (December 29, 1931 – October 11, 2000) was an American R&B singer and saxophonist. He had an R&B chart hit in 1955 with "There Goes That Train", and played the saxophone solo on the Silhouettes' 1957 US number one hit "Get a Job".

== Biography ==
He was born in Kingstree, South Carolina, and sang there in a gospel group, the Carolina Quartet Boys. By the early 1950s he was based in Philadelphia, where he attended music school and led a band, the Rhythm Rockers. Their first single, "There Goes That Train", was issued by the small Piney label in 1955, and was picked up by Mercury Records for national distribution, reaching number 10 on the Billboard R&B chart. The song was later covered by Snooks Eaglin. McGill recorded more tracks in Los Angeles in 1955 with guitarist Chuck Norris and pianist Ernie Freeman, and again in New York City in early 1956, but his later singles on Mercury were not hits.

McGill returned to Philadelphia, and recorded as both a solo performer and session musician for the local Kaiser and Junior labels run by Kae Williams. In October 1957 he recorded the saxophone solo on "Get a Job", originally released on Junior before being leased to Ember Records, for whom it became a number one pop hit. McGill could not read music; singer Richard Lewis said "Rollee just winged it".

McGill continued to record as a singer through the late 1950s and early 1960s, but with no significant success. In 1977 he released his last single "People Are Talking", credited to Rollee McGill and his Whippoorwills. He worked as a machinist from 1964 until his death, but also continued to perform locally in Philadelphia into the 1980s. In 1999, Bear Family Records released a 30-track CD compilation of his recordings titled Rhythm' Rockin' Blues.

McGill died in Philadelphia in 2000, aged 68.
