= Rock and roll revival =

The rock and roll revival was a back-to-basics musical trend of the late 1960s and early 1970s, in a sort-of backlash against the psychedelic and pop sounds then in vogue.

== History ==
As the Sixties ended, several early rock and rollers like Little Richard, Chuck Berry, Jerry Lee Lewis, Carl Perkins, Bill Haley & His Comets and Bo Diddley, who had been out of fashion since the British Invasion, experienced a resurgence in popularity, performing their old hits to a mix of old and new fans. Rock and roll revival festivals became popular, and anticipated the "oldies show" package tours of later years.

Bo Diddley announced "I'm back and I'm feelin' fine" in his comeback single titled Bo Diddley 1969, released by Checker Records. Sha Na Na performed "At the Hop" at the Woodstock Festival in 1969, in the revival spirit.

John Lennon and Yoko Ono had a surprise hit album in 1970 with Live Peace in Toronto 1969, recorded at the Toronto Rock and Roll Revival in September 1969. Appearing on the spur of the moment, with a hastily assembled band (composed of Lennon, Ono, Eric Clapton, Klaus Voormann and Alan White), Lennon led off their set with familiar songs (like "Blue Suede Shoes" and "Money (That's What I Want)") that suited the mood of the program.

In 1970, Dave Edmunds scored a big hit on both sides of the Atlantic with his cover of "I Hear You Knocking", and Chuck Berry's only song to hit #1 on the Billboard charts, his 1972 single "My Ding-a-Ling", were both written in the 1950s by Dave Bartholomew.

Elton John's 1972 hit "Crocodile Rock" was an homage to early rock 'n 'roll.

In 1977 and 1978, British band The Darts scored three top-10 singles on the UK charts with covers of early rock/doo-wop oldies.

Showaddywaddy, a rock and roll group formed in Leicester, England, in 1973. Specialising in revivals of hit songs from the 1950s and early 1960s, while also issuing original material. They have spent 209 weeks on the UK Singles Chart, and had 10 Top Ten singles, one reaching number one, "Under the Moon of Love", in 1976.

The popularity of the movement peaked with the release of the George Lucas film, American Graffiti, in 1973, with the soundtrack featuring rock and doo-wop hits from the late 1950s and early 1960s. By the mid-1970s, however, record sales of rock 'n' roll reissues and retro releases had greatly declined as the music industry turned its attention to other musical trends.

== 1950's Rock & Roll Revival ==
1950's Rock & Roll Revival
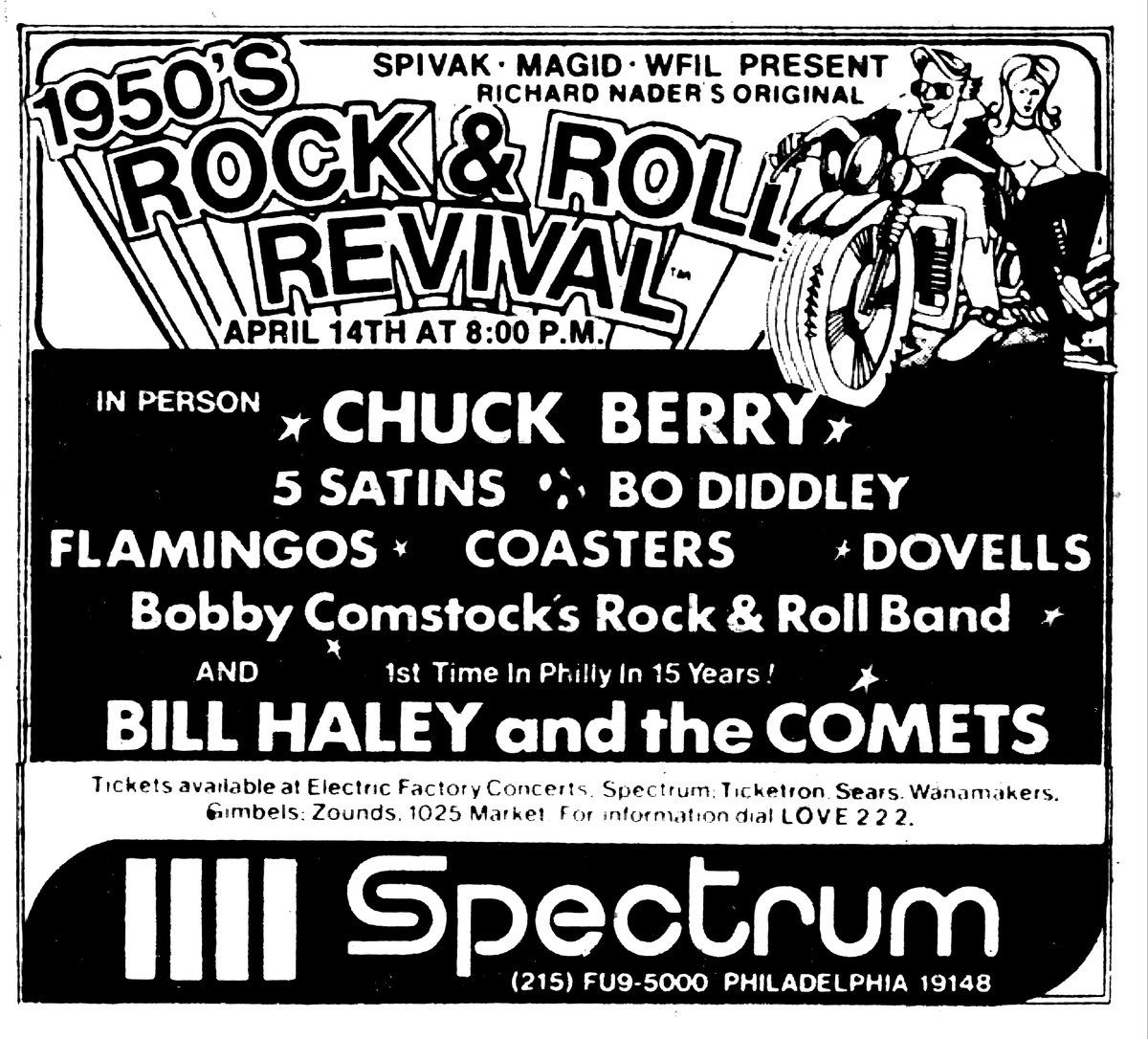
- Genre: Rock and roll, rhythm and blues, doo-wop
- Locations: Madison Square Garden, New York City, NY, United States
- Years active: 1969–1978
- Founders: Richard Nader

1950's Rock & Roll Revival was a concerts arranged by a disk jockey and the entertainment promoter Richard Nader who pushed the concept of oldies mainstream, beginning with his first Rock and Roll Revival concert October 18, 1969.

1950's Rock & Roll Revival

1950's Rock & Roll Revival
Date	Artists	Venue	Tour
October 18, 1969	Chuck Berry; The Platters; Bill Haley & The Comets; The Shirelles; The Coasters; Jimmy Clanton; Sha Na Na	Felt Forum at Madison Square Garden, New York City, NY	1950's Rock & Roll Revival
February 27, 1970	Bill Haley & The Comets; Bo Diddley; Jackie Wilson; The Coasters; The Drifters; The Shirelles	Detroit Olympia, Detroit, MI	1950's Rock & Roll Revival
March 20, 1970	Little Richard; Gene Vincent; Bo Diddley; Timi Yuro; The Five Satins; The Drifters; Ruby & the Romantics	Felt Forum at Madison Square Garden, New York City, NY	1950's Rock & Roll Revival
October 10, 1971	Chuck Berry; The Shirelles; The Coasters; Gary U.S. Bonds; Bo Diddley; Joey Dee & The Starliters	Richmond Coliseum, Richmond, VA	1950's Rock & Roll Revival
November 18, 1971	Bill Haley & The Comets; Chuck Berry; Bo Diddley; Gary U.S. Bonds; Bobby Comstock; The Dovells; The Shirelles	Spokane Coliseum, Spokane, WA	1950's Rock & Roll Revival
November 24, 1971	Bill Haley & The Comets; Chuck Berry; Bo Diddley; Gary U.S. Bonds; Bobby Comstock; The Dovells; The Shirelles	Sacramento Memorial Auditorium, Sacramento, CA	1950's Rock & Roll Revival
April 22, 1972	The Chiffons; Danny & The Juniors; The Crystals; Chuck Berry	State University of New York at Binghamton, Vestal, NY	1950's Rock & Roll Revival
July 14, 1972	Bill Haley & The Comets; Chubby Checker; Freddy Cannon; The Coasters	Southern Illinois University, Edwardsville, IL	1950's Rock & Roll Revival
October 22, 1972	Chuck Berry; Bo Diddley; The Coasters; The Chiffons; The Dovells; Freddy Cannon; Lloyd Price; Bobby Comstock	Cobo Arena, Detroit, MI	1950's Rock & Roll Revival
December 27, 1972	Jerry Lee Lewis; Lloyd Price; The Shirelles; The Drifters; The Skyliners; The Clovers; Bobby Comstock; Chubby Checker	Providence Civic Center, Providence, RI	1950's Rock & Roll Revival
March 2, 1973	Little Richard; Wilson Pickett; Chuck Jackson; The Chantels; The Flamingos; The Orlons; Bobby Day; Billy Vera; The Cleftones	Madison Square Garden, New York, NY	1950's Rock & Roll Revival
April 14, 1973	Chuck Berry; Bill Haley & The Comets; Bo Diddley; The Five Satins; The Flamingos; The Dovells; Bobby Comstock; The Coasters	The Spectrum, Philadelphia, PA	1950's Rock & Roll Revival
May 6, 1973	Little Richard; Chubby Checker; Bill Haley & The Comets; Bo Diddley; The Five Satins; Danny & The Juniors; Bobby Comstock	Buffalo Memorial Auditorium, Buffalo, NY	1950's Rock & Roll Revival
May 11, 1973	Bill Haley & The Comets; Little Richard; Bo Diddley; Chuck Berry; Chubby Checker; The Coasters; Danny & The Juniors; Dion & The Belmonts; Brenda Lee; The Shirelles	Nassau Veterans Memorial Coliseum, Uniondale, NY	1950's Rock & Roll Revival
May 13, 1973	Bill Haley & The Comets; Little Richard; Bobby Comstock; Bo Diddley; Danny & The Juniors; The Crystals	Utica Memorial Auditorium, Utica, NY	1950's Rock & Roll Revival
May 18, 1973	Bill Haley & The Comets; Little Richard; Bo Diddley; Chuck Berry; Chubby Checker; The Coasters; Danny & The Juniors; Dion & The Belmonts; Brenda Lee; The Shirelles	Cobo Arena, Detroit, MI	1950's Rock & Roll Revival
May 19, 1973	Bill Haley & The Comets; Little Richard; Bo Diddley; Chuck Berry; Chubby Checker; The Coasters; Danny & The Juniors; Dion & The Belmonts; Brenda Lee; The Shirelles	Maple Leaf Gardens, Toronto, ON	1950's Rock & Roll Revival
June 24, 1973	Bill Haley & The Comets; Bo Diddley; Chuck Berry; The Coasters; Danny & The Juniors	Nashville Fairgrounds Speedway, Nashville, TN	1950's Rock & Roll Revival
September 30, 1973	Chuck Berry; Jerry Lee Lewis; The Shirelles; The Platters; The Dovells; Shirley & Lee; The Moonglows; Bobby Comstock	The Spectrum, Philadelphia, PA	1950's Rock & Roll Revival
March 23, 1974	Chuck Berry; Jackie Wilson; The Coasters; The Angels; Johnny Maestro; Chubby Checker	Civic Arena, Pittsburgh, PA	1950's Rock & Roll Revival
May 11, 1974	Lloyd Price; The Orlons; Jimmy Clanton; Lee Andrews & the Hearts; The Dovells	Valley Forge Music Fair, Devon, PA	1950's Rock & Roll Revival

Rock & Roll Revival/Spectacular Vol.

Rock & Roll Revival/Spectacular Vol.
Date	Artists	Venue	Tour
February 7, 1971	Jerry Lee Lewis; Bill Haley & The Comets; Jay & The Americans; The Five Satins; The Skyliners; Freddy Cannon; The Dovells; Carl Perkins; The Angels; Ruby & The Romantics; Bobby Comstock	Madison Square Garden, New York City, NY	Rock & Roll Revival Vol. V
June 11, 1971	Jerry Lee Lewis; Bo Diddley; The Drifters; Duane Eddy; Little Eva; The Four Seasons; Jay & the Americans; The Crystals; Bobby Lewis; Bobby Comstock; The Del-Vikings	Madison Square Garden, New York City, NY	Rock & Roll Revival Vol. VI
October 15, 1971	Bo Diddley; Rick Nelson; Chuck Berry; Bobby Comstock; Bobby Rydell; The Shirelles; The Coasters; The Chiffons; Gary U.S. Bonds	Madison Square Garden, New York City, NY	Rock & Roll Revival Vol. VII
June 2, 1972	The Cleftones; Little Richard; Lloyd Price; Danny & The Juniors; Dion & The Belmonts; The Exciters; Shirley & Lee	Madison Square Garden, New York City, NY	Rock & Roll Spectacular Vol. IX
December 29, 1972	Jerry Lee Lewis; Lloyd Price; The Drifters; The Shirelles; Johnny Maestro; The Skyliners; The Clovers; Roy Orbison	Madison Square Garden, New York City, NY	Rock & Roll Spectacular Vol. XI
June 1, 1973	Chuck Berry; Bo Diddley; Chubby Checker; The Shirelles; The Five Satins; Danny & The Juniors; Brenda Lee	Madison Square Garden, New York City, NY	Rock & Roll Spectacular Vol. 13
March 14, 1975	Jerry Lee Lewis; Johnny Maestro; Lesley Gore; The Belmonts; The Drifters; Bo Diddley	Madison Square Garden, New York City, NY	Rock & Roll Spectacular Vol. 18
October 3, 1975	Bobby Comstock; Bobby Rydell; Chuck Berry; Jay & The Americans; Jerry Lee Lewis; Lloyd Price; Sha Na Na; The Coasters; The Five Satins	Madison Square Garden, New York City, NY	Rock & Roll Spectacular Vol. 19
March 12, 1976	Fats Domino; Little Anthony & The Imperials; Lesley Gore; Jay & The Americans; Johnny Maestro; Sha Na Na	Madison Square Garden, New York City, NY	Rock & Roll Spectacular Vol. 20
October 15, 1976	Chuck Berry; Bo Diddley; The Shirelles; The Drifters; The Coasters; The Five Satins; Sha Na Na	Madison Square Garden, New York City, NY	Rock & Roll Spectacular Vol. 21
March 4, 1977	The Supremes; Jay & The Americans; Lloyd Price; The Duprees; Johnny Maestro; Dion DiMucci	Madison Square Garden, New York City, NY	Rock & Roll Spectacular Vol. 22
March 3, 1978	Sha Na Na; Jay & The Americans; The Four Tops; Tommy James & The Shondells	Madison Square Garden, New York City, NY	Rock & Roll Spectacular Vol. 24
October 20, 1978	Jerry Lee Lewis; Bo Diddley; Bill Medley; Johnny Maestro; Martha Reeves & The Vandellas; Ronnie Spector; Wolfman Jack	Madison Square Garden, New York City, NY	Rock & Roll Spectacular Vol. 25

== 30 Years of Rock 'N' Roll ==
30 Years of Rock 'N' Roll
- Genre: Rock and roll, pop
- Years active: 1989–1995
- Founders: Ron Kurtz, Donnie Brooks

30 Years of Rock 'N' Roll

30 Years of Rock 'N' Roll
Date	Artists	Venue	Tour
August 24, 1991	Micky Dolenz; Gary Lewis & the Playboys; The Association; The Tokens; Jerry Corbetta; Bobby "Boris" Pickett; Al Wilson; Jewel Akens; Pat Upton; Donnie Brooks; Mike Pinera; Cannibal & the Headhunters; Tiny Tim	State Fair Grandstand, Syracuse, NY	30 Years of Rock 'N' Roll
July 31, 1993	Mitch Ryder & The Detroit Wheels; Cub Koda; Dennis Yost; Sonny Geraci; Len Barry; Pat Upton; Al Wilson; Donnie Brooks	Nashville North, Taylorville, IL	30 Years of Rock 'N' Roll
May 30, 1995	Otis Day & The Knights; Tiny Tim; Badfinger; Cub Koda; The Beau Brummels	Pine Knob Music Theatre, Clarkston, MI	30 Years of Rock 'N' Roll

== See also ==
- Boogie rock
- Revivalist artist
- Roots rock
- Swing revival
