= 41 Original Hits from the Soundtrack of American Graffiti =

Soundtrack album from American Graffiti by Various Artists
- Released: August 1973 (LP); June 22, 1993 (CD)
- Recorded: 1953–1964, 1973
- Genres: Rock and roll, doo-wop, R&B
- Length: 102:09
- Label: MCA 8001
- Producer: Gil Rodin (soundtrack producer)

Professional ratings
Review scores
Source	Rating
AllMusic	5/5 stars

41 Original Hits from the Soundtrack of American Graffiti is the official 1973 soundtrack album of the film American Graffiti. It has been certified triple platinum in the U.S., where it peaked at #10 on the Billboard 200 album chart.

Included in the film, but not on the soundtrack, are "Gee" by the Crows, "Louie Louie" by Flash Cadillac & the Continental Kids, and Harrison Ford's in-character a cappella rendition of "Some Enchanted Evening" (the reason for the latter two's exclusion is because those sequences weren't added to the film until the 1978 re-release; they were absent in the original 1973 released version)

A second compilation, titled More American Graffiti (MCA 8007) (and not to be confused with the 1979 film sequel of that name) was issued by MCA in early 1975 with George Lucas's approval. It features more rock and doo-wop hits from the late 1950s and early 1960s (only one of which, the Crows' "Gee", was featured in the film), along with additional Wolfman Jack dialogue. A third and final oldies compilation, titled American Graffiti Vol. III (MCA 8008) was also issued by MCA in early 1976. All three albums were released as 2-record sets, or as a double-length tape and are now entirely out of print.

All songs on the soundtrack album are presented in the order they appeared in the film.

The UK version of the soundtrack album is slightly reordered and omits three tracks: both Beach Boys songs and "Teen Angel" by Mark Dinning. The album is thus retitled "38 Original Hits from the Sound Track of American Graffiti".

Wolfman Jack appears on seven tracks: "That'll Be The Day", "Fannie Mae", "Barbara Ann", "Book of Love", "To the Aisle", "Green Onions", and "Only You (And You Alone)".

== Differences between vinyl and CD releases ==
Fats Domino's "Ain't That a Shame": On the original vinyl release of the soundtrack, an alternate version including an overdubbed female chorus (created for Domino's 1963 LP Let's Dance with Domino) is used. The CD issue uses the original hit single recording.

"Love Potion No. 9" by the Clovers: The vinyl release features the LP version which concludes with the lyrics "I had so much fun that I'm going back again. I wonder what will happen with Love Potion No. 10." The CD features the single version of the song which concludes by repeating the verse "But when I kissed the cop at 34th and Vine, he broke my little bottle of Love Potion No. 9."

"Party Doll" by Buddy Knox: fades out earlier than the original version during the final chorus.

The vinyl release of The Fleetwoods' "(He's) The Great Imposter" features a very early fade-out, omitting about 40 seconds.

== Track listing ==
=== LP ===
Side one
No.	Title	Original Artist and year	Length
1.	"Rock Around the Clock"	Bill Haley & the Comets 1954/1955	2:13
2.	"16 Candles"	The Crests 1958	2:55
3.	"Runaway"	Del Shannon 1961	2:22
4.	"Why Do Fools Fall in Love"	Frankie Lymon & the Teenagers 1956	2:22
5.	"That'll Be the Day"	Buddy Holly & The Crickets 1957	2:21
6.	"Fannie Mae"	Buster Brown 1959	2:59
7.	"At the Hop"	Flash Cadillac & the Continental Kids 1973	2:31
8.	"She's So Fine"	Flash Cadillac & the Continental Kids 1973	2:23
9.	"The Stroll"	The Diamonds 1957	2:31
10.	"See You in September"	The Tempos 1959	2:11
Total length:			24:48

Side two
No.	Title	Original Artist and year	Length
1.	"Surfin' Safari"	The Beach Boys 1962	2:09
2.	"(He's) The Great Imposter"	The Fleetwoods 1961	2:14
3.	"Almost Grown"	Chuck Berry 1959	2:22
4.	"Smoke Gets in Your Eyes"	The Platters 1958	2:40
5.	"Little Darlin'"	The Diamonds 1957	2:09
6.	"Peppermint Twist – Part 1"	Joey Dee and the Starlighters 1961	2:02
7.	"Barbara Ann"	The Regents 1961	2:15
8.	"The Book of Love"	The Monotones 1957	2:22
9.	"Maybe Baby"	Buddy Holly 1957	2:06
10.	"Ya Ya"	Lee Dorsey 1961	2:26
11.	"The Great Pretender"	The Platters 1955	2:40
Total length:			25:25

Side three
No.	Title	Original Artist and year	Length
1.	"Ain't That a Shame"	Fats Domino 1955	2:32
2.	"Johnny B. Goode"	Chuck Berry 1958	2:43
3.	"I Only Have Eyes for You"	The Flamingos 1959	3:29
4.	"Get a Job"	The Silhouettes 1957	2:48
5.	"To the Aisle"	The Five Satins 1957	2:46
6.	"Do You Want to Dance"	Bobby Freeman 1958	2:46
7.	"Party Doll"	Buddy Knox 1957	2:16
8.	"Come Go with Me"	The Del-Vikings 1956	2:44
9.	"You're Sixteen"	Johnny Burnette 1960	2:04
10.	"Love Potion No. 9"	The Clovers 1959	1:56
Total length:			26:04

Side four
No.	Title	Original Artist and year	Length
1.	"Since I Don't Have You"	The Skyliners 1958	2:41
2.	"Chantilly Lace"	The Big Bopper 1958	2:23
3.	"Teen Angel"	Mark Dinning 1959	2:48
4.	"Crying in the Chapel"	Sonny Til & the Orioles 1953	3:10
5.	"A Thousand Miles Away"	The Heartbeats 1957	2:28
6.	"Heart and Soul"	The Cleftones 1961	1:55
7.	"Green Onions"	Booker T. & the M.G.'s 1962	2:32
8.	"Only You (And You Alone)"	The Platters 1955	2:47
9.	"Goodnight, Well it's Time to Go"	The Spaniels 1954	2:53
10.	"All Summer Long"	The Beach Boys 1964	2:15
Total length:			25:52

=== CD ===
Disc One
No.	Title	Original Artist and year	Length
1.	"Rock Around the Clock"	Bill Haley & His Comets 1954/1955	2:13
2.	"16 Candles"	The Crests 1958	2:55
3.	"Runaway"	Del Shannon 1961	2:22
4.	"Why Do Fools Fall in Love"	Frankie Lymon & the Teenagers 1956	2:22
5.	"That'll Be the Day"	Buddy Holly & The Crickets 1957	2:21
6.	"Fanny Mae"	Buster Brown 1959	2:59
7.	"At the Hop"	Flash Cadillac & the Continental Kids 1973	2:31
8.	"She's So Fine"	Flash Cadillac & the Continental Kids 1973	2:23
9.	"The Stroll"	The Diamonds 1957	2:31
10.	"See You in September"	The Tempos 1959	2:11
11.	"Surfin' Safari"	The Beach Boys 1962	2:09
12.	"(He's) The Great Imposter"	The Fleetwoods 1961	2:14
13.	"Almost Grown"	Chuck Berry 1959	2:22
14.	"Smoke Gets in Your Eyes"	The Platters 1958	2:40
15.	"Little Darlin'"	The Diamonds 1957	2:09
16.	"Peppermint Twist – Part 1"	Joey Dee and the Starlighters 1961	2:02
17.	"Barbara Ann"	The Regents 1961	2:15
18.	"The Book of Love"	The Monotones 1957	2:22
19.	"Maybe Baby"	Buddy Holly 1958	2:06
20.	"Ya Ya"	Lee Dorsey 1961	2:26
21.	"The Great Pretender"	The Platters 1955	2:40
Total length:			50:13

Disc Two
No.	Title	Original Artist and year	Length
1.	"Ain't That a Shame"	Fats Domino 1955	2:32
2.	"Johnny B. Goode"	Chuck Berry 1958	2:43
3.	"I Only Have Eyes for You"	The Flamingos 1959	3:29
4.	"Get a Job"	The Silhouettes 1957	2:48
5.	"To the Aisle"	The Five Satins 1957	2:46
6.	"Do You Want to Dance"	Bobby Freeman 1958	2:46
7.	"Party Doll"	Buddy Knox 1957	2:16
8.	"Come Go with Me"	The Del-Vikings 1957	2:44
9.	"You're Sixteen"	Johnny Burnette 1960	2:04
10.	"Love Potion No. 9"	The Clovers 1959	1:56
11.	"Since I Don't Have You"	The Skyliners 1958	2:41
12.	"Chantilly Lace"	The Big Bopper 1958	2:23
13.	"Teen Angel"	Mark Dinning 1959	2:48
14.	"Crying in the Chapel"	Sonny Til & the Orioles 1953	3:10
15.	"A Thousand Miles Away"	The Heartbeats 1957	2:28
16.	"Heart and Soul"	The Cleftones 1961	1:55
17.	"Green Onions"	Booker T. & the M.G.'s 1962	2:32
18.	"Only You (And You Alone)"	The Platters 1955	2:47
19.	"Goodnite, Sweetheart, Goodnite"	The Spaniels 1954	2:53
20.	"All Summer Long"	The Beach Boys 1964	2:15
Total length:			51:56

== Charts ==
=== Weekly charts ===
Chart (1973–75)	Peak position
Australia (Kent Music Report)	12
Canada Top Albums/CDs (RPM)	6
New Zealand Albums (RMNZ)	15
UK Albums (Official Charts)	37
US Billboard 200	10

=== Year-end charts ===
Chart (1974)	Position
Canada Top Albums/CDs (RPM)	50
US Billboard 200	6

== Certifications ==
Region	Certification	Certified units/sales
United Kingdom (BPI)	Silver	60,000^{^}
United States (RIAA)	3× Platinum	3,000,000^{^}
^{^} Shipments figures based on certification alone.
