= Ember Records =

Ember Records may refer to:

- Ember Records (UK label), established in Britain in the 1950s by Jeffrey Kruger
- Ember Records (US label), established in New York by Al Silver
