= To the Aisle =

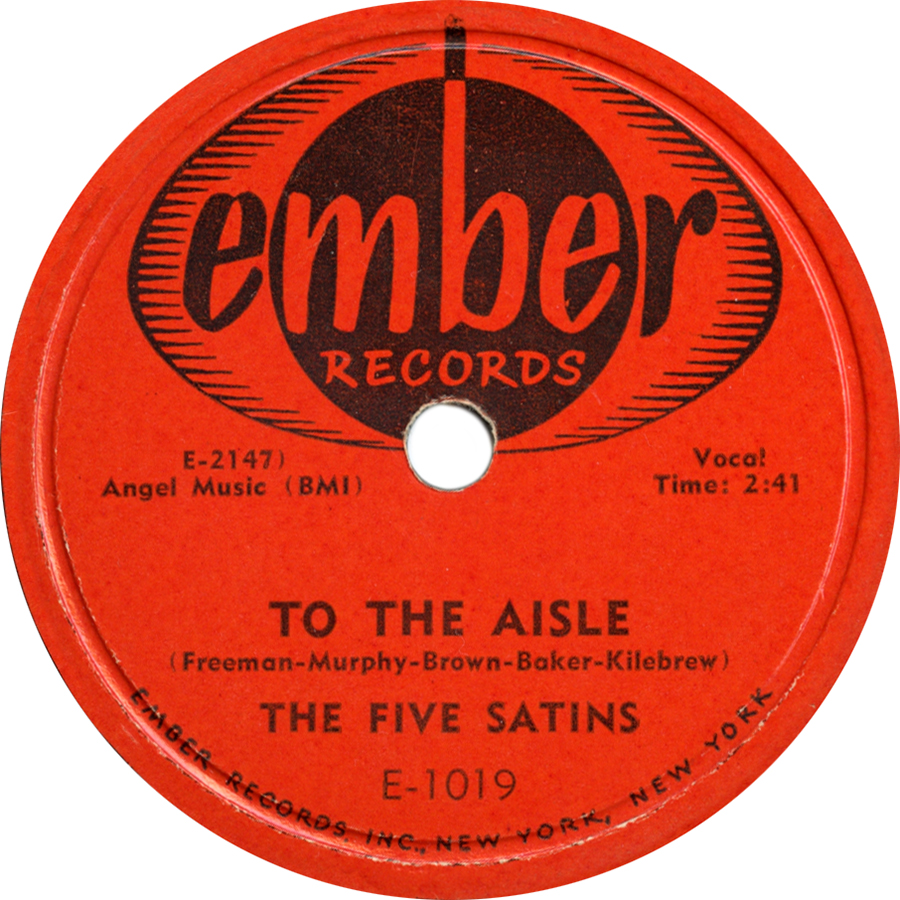

Single by The Five Satins
- B-side: "Wish I Had My Baby"
- Released: July 1957 (US)
- Genre: Pop
- Length: 2:41
- Label: Ember
- Songwriters: Jim Freeman, Jessie Murphy, Bill Baker, Tommy Killebrew, John Brown

"To the Aisle" is a 1957 song recorded by The Five Satins with songwriting credits to group members Jim Freeman, Jessie Murphy, Bill Baker, Tommy Killebrew, and John Brown. Bill Baker was the lead vocalist as their original lead vocalist Fred Parris was stationed overseas in Japan serving in the U.S. Army. The arrangement included an alto saxophone and an oboe played in harmony during the bridge and the oboe at the song's closing, very unusual for the time.

== Track listing ==
7" Vinyl

1. "To the Aisle"
2. "Wish I Had My Baby"

== Chart performance ==
In July 1957, the song peaked at #5 on the R&B charts and #25 on the Hot 100.

== In popular culture ==
The song is featured in the film American Graffiti (1973), and was included on the soundtrack album, 41 Original Hits from the Soundtrack of American Graffiti issued on MCA Records. The song had also been included on the compilation album Cruisin' 1957 which featured Philadelphia DJ Joe Niagara of WIBG, and issued by Increase Records in 1970.
