= Get a Job (song) =

1957 single by the Silhouettes

Single by the Silhouettes
- A-side: "I Am Lonely"
- Released: November 1957
- Recorded: October 1957
- Studio: Robinson Recording Laboratories, Philadelphia
- Genre: Doo-wop; rhythm and blues
- Length: 2:45
- Label: Junior
- Songwriters: Earl Beal; Raymond Edwards; Richard Lewis; William Horton

"Get a Job" is a song by American doo wop/R&B group the Silhouettes, released in November 1957. It reached the number one spot on the Billboard pop and R&B singles charts in February 1958, and was later included in Robert Christgau's "Basic Record Library" of 1950s and 1960s recordings, published in Christgau's Record Guide: Rock Albums of the Seventies (1981). The song celebrates the virtues of securing gainful employment.

== Background ==
"When I was in the service in the early 1950s and didn't come home and go to work, my mother said 'get a job' and basically that's where the song came from," said tenor Richard Lewis, who wrote the lyrics. The four members of the group shared the credit, jointly creating the "sha na na" and "dip dip dip dip" hooks later imitated by other doo-wop groups.

It was recorded at Robinson Recording Laboratories in Philadelphia in October 1957. Rollee McGill played the saxophone break, and the arranger was Howard Biggs. Intended as the B-side to "I Am Lonely", "Get a Job" was initially released on Kae Williams' Junior label; Williams, who was also a Philadelphia disc-jockey, was the Silhouettes' manager. Doug Moody, an executive at Ember Records, acquired the rights to the song for that label, where it was licensed for national distribution.

In early 1958, the Silhouettes performed "Get a Job" several times on American Bandstand and once on The Dick Clark Show, appearances that contributed to the song's success by exposing it to a large audience. (Note: Bandstand was a Philadelphia show, broadcast nationally by ABC. Bandstand producer Tony Mammarella bought a share of the rights to "Get a Job" from Kae Williams, an example of the "pay for play" practices for which Clark, Mammarella and others were later rebuked during the payola scandal.) Ultimately the single sold more than a million copies.

== Personnel ==
- Richard "Rick" Lewis - tenor vocals
- Bill Horton - lead vocals
- Earl T. Beal - baritone vocals
- Raymond Edwards - bass vocals
- Rollee McGill - saxophone
- Howard Biggs - arrangements

== Legacy ==
The song was later featured in the soundtracks of the movies American Graffiti (1973), Stand By Me (1986), Trading Places (1983), Get a Job (1985), Joey (1986), and Good Morning, Vietnam (1987).

The revival group Sha Na Na derived their name from the song's doo-wop introduction. They performed it at Woodstock in 1969.

"Get a Job" inspired a number of answer songs, including "Got a Job", the debut recording by the Miracles. Dennis Wilson, co-founder of the Beach Boys, believed that his group's song "She's Goin' Bald" (1967) paid homage to "Get a Job". Several bars of "Get a Job" are quoted at the start of "The Obvious Child," the first track on Paul Simon's album The Rhythm of the Saints.

== Album appearances ==
In addition to the 1973 American Graffiti soundtrack album (MCA2-8001), the song appears on the 1962 compilation Alan Freed's Top 15 (End LP 315), the 1964 compilation Original Golden Hits of the Great Groups Vol. III (Mercury MGH 25007), as well as the 1973 ABC Records compilation Rock 'N' Soul 1958 (ABCX-1958).

== See also ==
- List of 1950s one-hit wonders in the United States
