= Mr. Music Man =

Mr. Music Man or Mister Music Man may refer to:

== Music ==
- Kojo Antwi, a Ghanaian Afro pop, highlife and reggae musical artist

=== Albums ===
- Mr. Music Man, 1981 album by Val Doonican
- Mr. Music Man, 1978 album by Al Campbell
- Mr. Music Man, a 1995 album by Ghanaian musician Kojo Antwi

=== Songs ===
- "Mister Music Man", French-language Eurovision entry for Switzerland 1992
- "Mr. Music Man", by The King Blues from Under the Fog, 2006
- "Mr. Music Man", by Tommy Edwards, 1958
- "Mr. Music Man", by Labelle from Pressure Cookin', 1973

== Other ==
- Mr Music Man: My Life in Showbiz, an autobiography by Mervyn Conn

== See also ==
- "Hey! Mr. Music Man", a song by Peters and Lee, 1976
- "Please Mr. Music Man", a song by Harry Nilsson from Early Tymes
