= My Elusive Dreams =

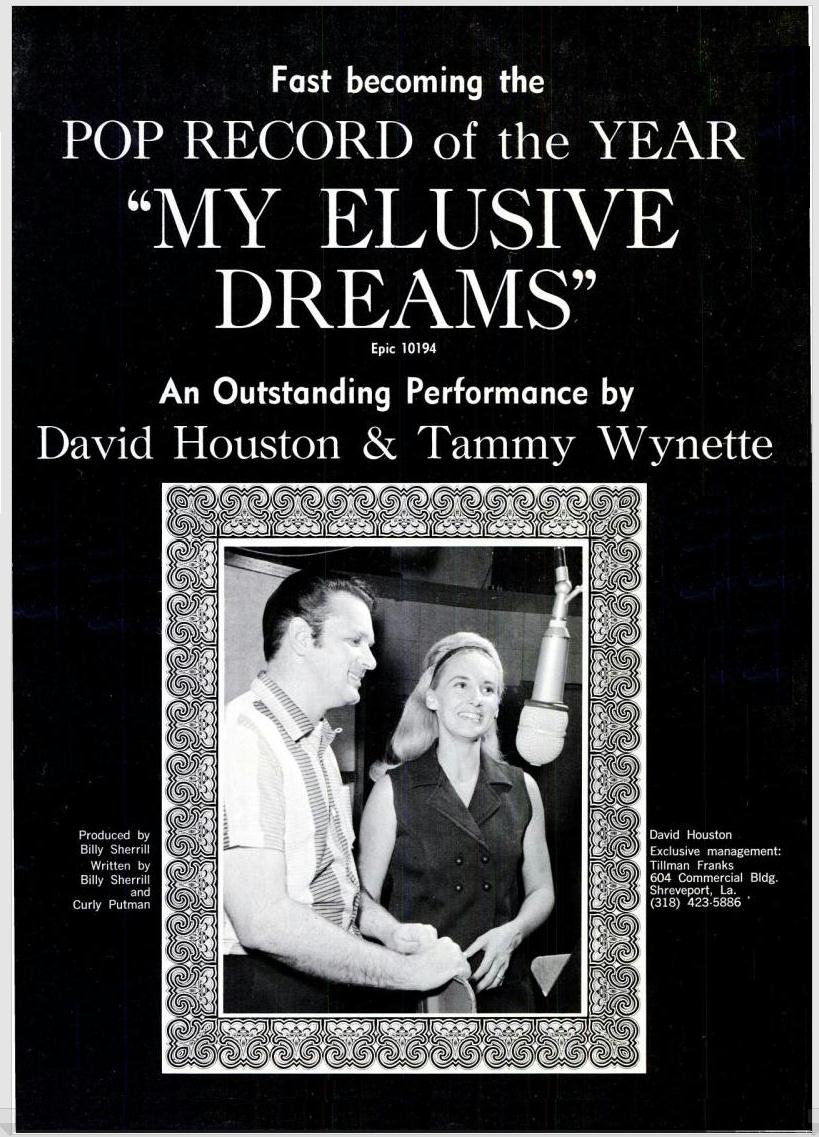

Single by David Houston and Tammy Wynette

from the album My Elusive Dreams
- B-side: "Marriage on the Rocks"
- Released: June 1967
- Genre: Country
- Label: Epic
- Songwriter(s): Billy Sherrill; Curly Putman
- Producer(s): Billy Sherrill

David Houston and Tammy Wynette singles chronology
"My Elusive Dreams" (1967)	"It's All Over" (1968)

"My Elusive Dreams" is a country music song written by Billy Sherrill and Curly Putman. Putman recorded his song in March 1967 and released it on ABC Records in June 1967, peaking at #41 on the Hot Country Singles charts and #34 on the Bubbling Under Hot 100. The song was later recorded by several artists. The best-known version was recorded as a duet by David Houston and Tammy Wynette, and was a No. 1 country hit in October 1967; the song also peaked at No. 89 on the Billboard Hot 100. Wynette recorded a second duet version of My Elusive Dreams in 1973 with George Jones; this version was included on the Let's Build a World Together album. A 1975 Irish version by Philomena Begley and Ray Lynam is referenced in The Pogues’s A Pair of Brown Eyes.

== Song background ==
The song follows a restless man and his wife, as he attempts to find an ever-elusive and lasting happiness pursuing various dreams and schemes, all which are ill-fated. The man's attempts at making something work include stops in at least six states: Texas, Utah, Alabama (specifically, Birmingham), Tennessee (specifically, Memphis - where the wife gave birth to their child - and later Nashville), Nebraska and finally Alaska (it is implied that during their stint there, their child died and was buried there). The man finally admits to his resigned wife that he recognizes she's tired of following him around the country and that his dreams are fleeting.

== Other versions ==
- Immediately after the Putman release, it was recorded by three different acts, a duet by David Houston & Tammy Wynette, one by Rusty Draper and another by Johnny Darrell. All four of the versions charted in 1967. Putman's version of the song made its chart debut on the chart dated for July 8, 1967, one week before the Houston-Wynette version, which went to #1 in October 1967. Draper's version peaked at #70 and Darrell's version peaked at #73
- The song has been recorded by countless numbers of acts over the years, but there were two more charting versions released. In 1970, Bobby Vinton took his version of "My Elusive Dreams", which was also the title to his album of the same name, to #27 on the country charts and #46 on the pop charts.
- In 1975, Charlie Rich took the song again onto the country and pop charts, this time taking it to #3 on the country charts and #49 on the pop chart.
- Roger Miller recorded a cover in 1968, and in 1970, Andy Williams released a version in 1974 on his album, You Lay So Easy on My Mind.
- Nancy Sinatra and Lee Hazlewood recorded one version, and so did The Everly Brothers.
- A 1974 version by Irish singers Ray Lynam and Philomena Begley is referenced in 'A Pair of Brown Eyes', a 1985 single by The Pogues: "While Ray and Philomena sang of my elusive dreams".

== Chart performance ==
=== Curly Putman ===
Chart (1967)	Peak position
U.S. Billboard Hot Country Singles	41
U.S. Billboard Bubbling Under Hot 100	34

=== David Houston and Tammy Wynette ===
Chart (1967)	Peak position
U.S. Billboard Hot Country Singles	1
U.S. Billboard Hot 100	89

=== Johnny Darrell ===
Chart (1967)	Peak position
U.S. Billboard Hot Country Singles	73

=== Bobby Vinton ===
Chart (1970)	Peak position
Australia (Kent Music Report)	88
U.S. Billboard Hot Country Singles	27
U.S. Billboard Hot 100	46
U.S. Billboard Hot Adult Contemporary Tracks	7

=== Frankie Stevens ===
Chart (1970)	Peak position
New Zealand (Listener)	5

=== Charlie Rich ===
Chart (1975)	Peak position
U.S. Billboard Hot Country Singles	3
U.S. Billboard Hot 100	49
U.S. Billboard Hot Adult Contemporary Tracks	16
Canadian RPM Country Tracks	5
Canadian RPM Adult Contemporary Tracks	15
