= Let the Good Times Roll (film) =

1973 film by Robert Abel

- Theatrical release poster
- Directed by: Robert Abel; Sidney Levin
- Produced by: Charles W. Fries
- Cinematography: Robert C. Thomas
- Edited by: Bud Friedgen; Hyman Kaufman
- Distributed by: Columbia Pictures
- Release date: May 25, 1973
- Running time: 99 minutes
- Country: United States
- Language: English
- Box office: $1,050,000 (US/ Canada rentals)

Let the Good Times Roll is a 1973 rockumentary / concert film directed by Robert Abel and Sidney Levin. It features numerous stars from the American pop and rock music scene of the 1950s.

== Summary ==
The film edits together footage of two concerts from 1973, one at Nassau Coliseum on Long Island, and a second at Cobo Hall in Detroit, Michigan, during the height of a series of multi-artist tours known as the "Rock and Roll Revival," interspersed with footage of the singers from the 1950s and 60s. It also includes interviews with the singers.

== Cast ==
The film features performances from numerous stars from the 1950s and early 1960s, including

- Chuck Berry
- Chubby Checker
- The Coasters
- Danny and the Juniors
- Bo Diddley
- Fats Domino
- The Five Satins
- Bill Haley and the Comets
- Little Richard
- The Shirelles
- Bobby Comstock

The film ends with a rare, and apparently impromptu, duet between Berry and Diddley, who had recorded together before, but were not often filmed on stage together.

== Style ==
The film uses split screen techniques to contrast the performers' appearances in the 1950s and in the 1970s (as well as clips from 1950s-era films such as I Was a Teenage Werewolf). Vincent Canby, writing for The New York Times, described it as "world's-fair avant-garde".

== Themes ==
The film was historically significant because it was one of the earliest 1950s nostalgic themed films that inaugurated that genre.

Christine Sprengler argued that the film was an attempt to show "musical milestones" in the context of the times (both political and social), and, like American Graffiti and Grease, sets rock and roll as the soundtrack to the decade.

Canby noted that the film may have a possibly unintentional social commentary, with the majority-white audience giving the black fist to the majority-African American performers. He suggests that it implied that "there are no black memories of the nineteen-fifties".

== Release and reception ==
Let the Good Times Roll premiered on May 25, 1973, in four theatres; two in New York City, one in Hicksville, New York and one in Totowa, New Jersey. It was later shown in Finland, Hungary, and Sweden. Steven Otfinoski credits its success with bolstering Bo Diddley's career, which at the time was stagnating.

Canby noted that the performers seemed much different than they were during their earlier careers, with gained weight, longer and thinner hair, and Little Richard having "openly embraced androgyny". Overall, he considered the film an "engaging, technically superior concert film that recalls music of the nineteen-fifties". A review in Variety stated, "Columbia's 'Let the Good Times Roll' is a smash recreation of 1950s rock 'n' roll frenzy, a moving and exciting nostalgia trip" that "could become one of the sleepers of 1973." Roger Ebert of the Chicago Sun-Times gave the film three stars out of four and wrote that it "gives us mostly the music of the late 1950s as performed 15 years later by the same artists. But it doesn’t condescend. It isn't a movie that finds anything camp about Chuck Berry singing 'Johnny B. Goode.' It understands that if the song and the singer were good then, they are both still good." Gene Siskel of the Chicago Tribune awarded three-and-a-half stars out of four and wrote, "Interspersed among the 28 songs (including Chuck Berry with his 'Johnny B. Goode,' Danny and the Juniors bubbling 'At the Hop,' and The Five Satins wailing 'In the Still of the Night,') are film clips and photographs of the persons, movies, and fads that marked the time and, seen again, bring on laughter and a wistful feeling." Kevin Thomas of the Los Angeles Times described the film as "an infectiously nostalgic—and therefore often amusing—entertainment that should appeal as much to the youth of today as to those of us who came of age in the 50s." Tom Zito of The Washington Post called it "the first film to view rock 'n' roll in its broad cultural perspective. The result may well be the best rock film yet." Mark Deming of Allmovie wrote that the artists are in "fine shape" and that Let the Good Times Roll is one of the "few movies about '50s rock that well and truly rocks".

The film has been shown on Turner Classic Movies (TCM) with an introductory analysis by host Ben Mankiewicz. The film has not been released on DVD.

== Soundtrack album ==
The Bell Records label released a 2-disc soundtrack album featuring performances from the film, including complete versions of songs truncated in the film (such as Bill Haley's 'Shake, Rattle and Roll'). Omitted from the album, however, are any of Chuck Berry's performances due to Berry being under contract to Chess Records at the time; this includes his jam session with Bo Diddley, although Diddley's other two performances are retained on the album.

=== Charts ===
| Chart (1973) | Position |
|---|---|
| Australia (Kent Music Report) | 52 |

== See also ==
- The London Rock and Roll Show, a similar film released the same year, chronicling a concert in London, England, and featuring many of the same performers.
