= Ulysses Kae Williams =

American DJ

Ulysses Kae Williams (February 4, 1921 – December 29, 1987) was an American DJ, record label owner and producer, known as one of the earliest local deejays to play the blues.

Born in Philadelphia, Pennsylvania, USA, he started in radio around 1945 and worked for numerous area stations, including WSSJ, WDAS, WHAT (AM), and WCAM. At the same time, he worked for the Philadelphia Tribune, from 1945 to 1948 as theatrical and night club critic. Williams managed several local acts, including Lee Andrews & the Hearts, and Solomon Burke (from 1954 to 1957). In the mid-1950s, Kae reached what would be eventually the high point of his career, when the group he was managing, The Silhouettes, had a huge pop hit with "Get a Job". The track sold several million copies in the US and abroad and topped the pop charts. Williams also managed a group called The Sensations, which sold close to a million with the pop tune "Let Me In". Kae Williams inspired many youngsters, black and white, to go into radio and music.

Williams died on December 29, 1987, in Philadelphia.

His second son, Ulysses Kae Jr., (1956–2008), was a record producer, whose Catch Me I'm Falling by the group Pretty Poison climbed the charts on its release.

== Awards ==
- BMD Publishers Award (1957) for Get a Job
- Mary DEE Award for outstanding community service and broadcasting (1978)
- Lifetime Achievement Award (1989) (presented to his son, Kae Williams Jr.)
- Chairman of the National Association of Television and Radio Announcers
