= Bobby Comstock =

American singer (1941–2020)

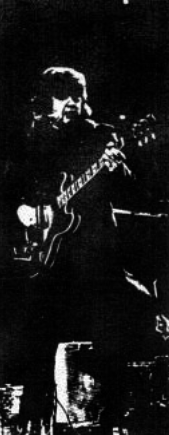

Background information
- Born: December 29, 1941; Ithaca, New York, U.S.
- Died: January 9, 2020 (aged 78) California, U.S.
- Genres: Rock and roll, pop
- Occupation: Singer
- Years active: 1958–1990s

Robert L. Comstock (December 29, 1941 – January 9, 2020) was an American rock and roll and pop singer and musician who had success in the late 1950s and early 1960s both as a solo singer and as a member of Bobby Comstock and the Counts. His biggest hits were a version of "Tennessee Waltz" in 1959, and "Let's Stomp" in 1963.

== Biography ==
Comstock was born in Ithaca, New York, and began singing and playing mandolin as a child. At the age of seven, he started appearing regularly with his brother on a local radio station, and then on country music radio in Sayre, Pennsylvania.

In 1958, after hearing rock and roll broadcasts from Nashville, he formed his own band, Bobby and the Counts. The band had Comstock on guitar and lead vocals, Fred Ciaschi (vocals & piano), Gus Eframson (rhythm guitar), Dale Sherwood (drums), Chuck Ciaschi (bass) and (initially) Bill Lucas (bongos & vocals). The group recorded their first single, "Too Young"/"Tra-La-La", for Marlee Records in Trumansburg, New York, and in 1959 were signed to a national deal by Triumph Records, established by Herb Abramson after he left Atlantic. The groups moderately rocked-up version of the Patti Page hit "Tennessee Waltz" was released on the subsidiary Blaze label in late 1959 - with the group now being billed as Bobby Comstock & The Counts - and rose to no.52 on the Billboard pop chart.

As a result of its success, the group appeared on several package shows promoted by Alan Freed, toured nationally with artists such as Bobby Vinton and Freddie Cannon, and appeared on Dick Clark's American Bandstand. Their follow-up record, a version of Hank Williams' "Jambalaya", released on the Atlantic label, also made the national pop chart, reaching no.90.

The group, with several changes of personnel over the years, continued to release singles on Abramson's label until 1962, with diminishing success, before signing with Lawn. Their first record for the label, "Let's Stomp", released as a Bobby Comstock single, reached no.57 on the US pop chart in early 1963. The song was written by Bob Feldman, Jerry Goldstein and Richard Gottehrer, who later recorded as The Strangeloves. It was reputedly performed by the Beatles in Hamburg and was certainly performed by the Searchers and recorded by Lee Curtis and the All-Stars, a beat group featuring ex-Beatle Pete Best. The 1973 single, The Ballroom Blitz by British Glam Rock Heavy Rock band The Sweet bases its initial guitar riff and drum patterns on Comstock’s "Let's Stomp".

Follow-ups were less successful, although the group broke into the US charts for a final time in 1963 with "Your Boyfriend's Back", an answer record to "My Boyfriend's Back" by the Angels, a female group recording on the same label. Comstock also played guitar on the Angels' album, along with Feldman, Goldstein and Gottehrer. He stayed with Lawn Records until 1964 and performed as a support act to The Rolling Stones that year. He then signed to Ascot Records, who continued to release singles by the group until 1966. Comstock also recorded a solo album, Out of Sight, in 1966.

In 1968 Comstock formed a short-lived band, Zebra, which recorded for Phillips Records, and then established another band, Comstock Ltd., which released several singles for Bell Records between 1969 and 1972. He also established himself as a regular member of rock and roll revival tours, especially as part of Dick Clark's "Caravan of Stars", where he performed with Chuck Berry, Bo Diddley, Jackie Wilson, Gene Pitney, The Coasters, The Shirelles and many others. Comstock continued to perform on such tours, both with his own band and as a backing musician, until the late 1990s. He appeared in the 1973 Columbia Pictures concert film Let the Good Times Roll hosted by Richard Nader.

Comstock's son, Bobby Jr., was an on-air personality and program director at WXHC-FM in Homer, New York from 2004 until 2014.

Comstock died on January 9, 2020, at the age of 78 at his home in southern California.
