= The Silhouettes =

American doo-wop group

The Silhouettes

The Silhouettes were an American doo wop/R&B group, whose single "Get a Job" was a number 1 hit on the Billboard R&B singles chart and pop singles chart in 1958. The doo-wop revival group Sha Na Na derived their name from the song's lyrics, later performing "Get a Job" in the 1978 movie Grease. "Get a Job" is included in the soundtracks of the films American Graffiti, Trading Places, and Stand by Me. The Silhouettes performed in the 1986 movie Joey.

== Career ==
The Silhouettes were formed in Philadelphia, Pennsylvania, United States, in 1956, at first using the name The Thunderbirds. Their hit "Get a Job" – originally the B-side to "I Am Lonely" – was issued by their manager, Kae Williams, on his own Junior Records label before being sold to the nationally distributed Ember label in late 1957. It reached number 1 on both the R&B and pop charts in US and the group performed it on television's American Bandstand. The song sold more than one million copies and was awarded a gold record.

The lyrics of "Get a Job" are notable for the depiction of a household in tension because of unemployment, despite the man's desperate attempts to find work, all delivered in a relentlessly upbeat style. A second release, "Heading for the Poorhouse", continued the economic theme. It was one of the few songs to allude to inflation, the trip to the poorhouse being because "all our money turned brown." This single and all their subsequent singles sold poorly and the group never entered the national charts again, making them a classic example of "one-hit wonders."

The Silhouettes toured with Sam Cooke, Jackie Wilson, Clyde McPhatter, and others. They disbanded in 1968, but the four original members re-formed the group in the 1980s and continued to work until 1993.

== Group members ==
- Richard "Rick" Lewis, tenor (September 2, 1933 – April 19, 2005)
- Bill Horton, lead (December 25, 1929 – January 23, 1995)
- Earl T. Beal, baritone (July 18, 1924, Donora, Pennsylvania – March 22, 2001)
- Raymond Edwards, bass (September 22, 1922, Virginia – March 4, 1997)
- John "Bootsie" Wilson, lead (July 18, 1940 – September 21, 2009)
