= Kathie Kay =

English singer (1918–2005)

- Birth name: Kathleen Thornhill
- Born: 20 November 1918; Gainsborough, Lincolnshire, England
- Died: 9 March 2005 (aged 86); Largs, Ayrshire, Scotland
- Occupation: Singer

Kathie Kay (born Kathleen Thornhill; 20 November 1918 – 9 March 2005) was a singer from Lincolnshire, known for her radio and television appearances in the Billy Cotton Band Show during the 1950s and 1960s. Her best known recordings are "We Will Make Love" and "A House With Love in It".

== Biography ==
Kathie Kay was born Kathleen Thornhill in Gainsborough, Lincolnshire. She began her career as a toddler with the famous Corona Babes Stage School as Connie Wood, then moved on to appear with Hughie Green as head girl in his gang show; he was later best man at her wedding. She was spotted by Billy Cotton, and first performed with him on radio in 1949, making the move to television and remaining until the show ended in 1968. She also worked with Harry Lauder and George Formby. For many years she presented her own programme on Scottish Television, where she was dubbed 'the Fireside Girl'. She was married to the Scottish impresario Archie McCulloch, who died in September 1997.

She died from Alzheimer's disease, in Largs, Scotland, at the age of 86, and was survived by three sons: Stewart McCulloch OBE, Donald McCulloch and Ken McCulloch.
