= Vernon Oxford =

American singer-songwriter

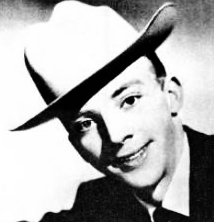
- Vernon Oxford in 1968

Background information
- Born: June 8, 1941; Rogers, Arkansas, U.S.
- Died: August 18, 2023 (aged 82) Nashville, Tennessee, U.S.
- Genre: Country
- Occupation: Singer-songwriter
- Instruments: Fiddle, guitar
- Years active: 1966–1982
- Labels: RCA, Meteor, Rounder

Vernon Oxford (June 8, 1941 – August 18, 2023) was an American country music singer and guitarist.

== Biography ==
He was born in Rogers, Arkansas, United States. Oxford was raised in Wichita, Kansas, United States, where his father played old-time fiddle. He began playing professionally in Utah in 1960, mostly playing in the Kansas area in the early 1960s, then relocated to Nashville in 1964. In 1965, he met Harlan Howard, who got him signed to RCA Victor and helped him find material to record. He then released seven singles and one LP, Woman Let Me Sing You a Song; none of them charted, and he was soon dropped from RCA.

His career saw a resurgence in Britain, where he was first rediscovered in the middle of the 1970s. A best-of was issued there in 1974, and RCA signed him again to tour there. His hit singles "Shadows of My Mind", "Redneck (The Redneck National Anthem)", and "A Good Old Fashioned Saturday Night Honky Tonk Barroom Brawl" (U.S. Country No. 55, 1977) reinvigorated his career in America; in Britain, he was well known for "I've Got to Get Peter Off Your Mind" and "Field of Flowers". He also recorded a comedy duet with Jim Ed Brown, "Mowing The Lawn". After a break of several years, he began a career as a gospel singer in 1981.

== Recording career ==
Mostly as an independent artist, Oxford continued to record new material. Oxford's classic recordings have been reissued by numerous labels, including a comprehensive box set from Bear Family Records, and some compilations from Westside UK and the Morello label, which is a division of UK-based Cherry Red Records.

== Acting career ==
As an actor, Oxford appeared in several films including The Thing Called Love starring River Phoenix, and Coal Miner's Daughter, a 1980 film about American singer Loretta Lynn, who was portrayed by actress Sissy Spacek.

== Discography ==
=== Albums ===
Year	Album	Label
1966	Woman, Let Me Sing You a Song	RCA
1975	By Public Demand	RCA
1977	I Just Want to Be a Country Singer	RCA
1978	A Tribute to Hank Williams	Meteor
1978	Nobody's Child	Meteor
1979	If I Had My Wife to Love Over	Rounder
1980	His and Hers	Rounder
1981	A Better Way of Life	Rounder
1982	Keepin' It Country	Rounder

=== Singles ===
Year	Single	Chart Positions		Album
Year	Single	US Country	CAN Country	Album
1974	"How High Does Cotton Grow"	—	—	single only
1975	"I Wish You Would Leave Me Alone"	—	—	By Public Demand
1975	"Giving the Pill"	—	—	I Just Want to Be a Country Singer
1975	"Shadows of My Mind"	54	38	I Just Want to Be a Country Singer
1976	"Your Wanting Me Is Gone"	83	—	I Just Want to Be a Country Singer
1976	"Redneck! (The Redneck National Anthem)"	17	—	I Just Want to Be a Country Singer
1976	"Clean Your Own Tables"	60	—	I Just Want to Be a Country Singer
1977	"A Good Old Fashioned Saturday Night Honky Tonk Barroom Brawl"	55	—	singles only
1977	"Only the Shadows Know"	87	—	singles only
1977	"Redneck Roots"	95	—	singles only
1981	"His and Hers"	—	—	His and Hers
1981	"They'll Never Take Her Love from Me"	—	—	His and Hers
