= The Country Gazette =

The Country Gazette is a weekly newspaper serving the Massachusetts towns of Bellingham, Foxborough, Franklin, Medway, Millis, Norfolk, Plainville and Wrentham. The free paper is distributed to residents of these towns located along the Interstate 495 corridor on Fridays.

The Country Gazette is owned by GateHouse Media and falls under the umbrella of Community Newspaper Company which runs weekly and daily newspapers in Massachusetts including The MetroWest Daily News and The Milford Daily News.

Information that appears in the Country Gazette is also posted to eight Web sites hosted on www.wickedlocal.com, one dedicated to each of the eight towns.

- Bellingham at www.wickedlocal.com/bellingham
- Foxborough at www.wickedlocal.com/foxborough
- Franklin at www.wickedlocal.com/franklin
- Medway at www.wickedlocal.com/medway
- Millis at www.wickedlocal.com/millis
- Norfolk at www.wickedlocal.com/norfolk
- Plainville at www.wickedlocal.com/plainville
- Wrentham at www.wickedlocal.com/wrentham

The Country Gazette office is in Milford at 159 South Main Street. It was founded by William and Doris Baldwin in 1981. The free bi-weekly newspaper launched its first edition at the 1981 Franklin Trade Show. In the 1980s, the Gazette was direct-mailed each Wednesday to the towns of Franklin, Wrentham, Bellingham, Medway, Millis, Norfolk and Plainville. Ellen Albanese joined the staff as an editor and, within a few years, the paper grew to semi-weekly editions, with the advent of the Gazette's Weekender edition on Saturdays.
