= Country Fever =

Studio album by Rick Nelson
- Released: April 17, 1967
- Genre: Country
- Length: 28:53
- Label: Decca
- Producer: Charles "Bud" Dant

Rick Nelson chronology
On the Flip Side (1966)	Country Fever (1967)	Another Side of Rick (1967)

Singles from Country Fever
- 1. "Alone" Released: October 1966; 2. "Take a City Bride" Released: April 1967

Country Fever is the fifteenth studio album by American singer Rick Nelson, and his ninth for Decca Records, released on April 17, 1967. The album features Nelson's composition of "Alone" and a cover of Bob Dylan's "Walkin' Down The Line", Nelson's earliest Dylan cover.

The Single from the album, "Take a City Bride", debuted on the Hot Country Singles & Tracks charts, in the issue dated June 10, 1967, peaking at number 58 during its five-week stay.

The sessions also produced a couple of numbers taken from old Sun Records by Elvis Presley; "Mystery Train", which was included on the album. He sampled the classic country catalog, including "You Win Again," "Funny How Time Slips Away," and "(I Heard That) Lonesome Whistle Blow." "Alone" was a self-penned tune while "Walkin' Down the Line" was the first Bob Dylan song that he recorded. These songs formed a kind of semi-autobiographical trilogy, as he sketched himself as a desolate but determined loner. Jimmie Haskell arranged the album and Charles "Bud" Dant produced it, this was the last of fifteen consecutive Nelson studio LPs, produced by Charles "Bud" Dant.

The album was released on compact disc by Ace Records on June 23, 1998 as tracks 12 through 24 on a pairing of two albums on one CD with tracks 1 through 12 consisting of Nelson's 1966 album, Bright Lights and Country Music. Bear Family included the album in the 2008 For You: The Decca Years box set.

== Reception ==
Professional ratings
Review scores
Source	Rating
AllMusic	3/5 stars
Billboard	4/5 stars
The Encyclopedia of Popular Music	4/5 stars
Record Mirror	4/5 stars

Cash Box, in its Pop Best Bet Album review, stated, "Nelson faithfully translates the lyrics in a voice that is both mellow and sincere.

Richie Unterberger of AllMusic said that "Country Fever continued the country direction of Nelson's previous album, Bright Lights & Country Music, and the approach of each record was similarly weighted toward interpretations of country classics", giving it three-star rating

Record Mirror described the album as "one of his consistent performances" and stated that "His own composition is more than honky-tonk can rare with treatments by long-time country greats, giving it four-star ratings. The Encyclopedia of Popular Music and Billboard also gave the album four-star ratings as well.

== Track listing ==
=== Side one ===
No.	Title	Writer(s)	Length
1.	"Take a City Bride"	Gib Guilbeau	1:57
2.	"Funny How Time Slips Away"	Willie Nelson	2:56
3.	"The Bridge Washed Out"	Mel Melshee, Jimmy Louis, Sandra Smith, Slim Williamson	1:47
4.	"Alone"	Rick Nelson	2:38
5.	"Big Chief Buffalo Nickel (Desert Blues)"	Jimmie Rodgers	2:01
6.	"Mystery Train"	Junior Parker	2:26

=== Side two ===
No.	Title	Writer(s)	Length
1.	"Things You Gave Me"	Glen Hardin	1:52
2.	"Take These Chains from My Heart"	Hy Heath, Fred Rose	2:36
3.	"(I Heard That) Lonesome Whistle"	Hank Williams, Jimmie Davis	2:38
4.	"Walkin' Down the Line"	Bob Dylan	2:23
5.	"You Win Again"	Hank Williams	2:50
6.	"Salty Dog"	Zeke Morris, Wiley Morris	2:35
