= The Hot Band =

The Hot Band may refer to:

- The backing band formed by American soul musician Sylvester James in 1973
- The backing band for Emmylou Harris from 1974 to 1991

== See also ==
- Hot band, a phenomenon in molecular vibrational spectroscopy
