= Miki & Griff =

British country music duo

- Years active: 1950–1980s
- Label: Pye
- Past members: Barbara "Miki" Griffith; Emyr Griffith

Miki & Griff were a British country music duo, who had several hit singles on the UK Singles Chart in the late 1950s and early 1960s. Miki was Barbara Macdonald Griffith (née Salisbury; 22 June 1920 – 20 April 1989); Griff was born Emyr Morus Griffith (9 May 1923 – 24 September 1995).

== History ==
Barbara Salisbury was born in Ayrshire, Scotland, and Emyr Griffith was born in Flintshire, Wales. They first met while singing in the George Mitchell Singers in 1947. After leaving the Mitchell choir, they performed as members of country and novelty group Johnny Denis & his Ranchers, and married in 1950.

They established themselves as a duo in variety shows, under the name Miki & Griff, and while working with entertainer Max Bygraves performed comedy skits in addition to pop and country songs. They were seen by Lonnie Donegan, who used them on his television shows and won them a recording contract with Pye Records.

From 1959 to 1975, they released several singles, mostly produced by Donegan, their most successful being their version of "A Little Bitty Tear" which reached number 16 on the UK Singles Chart in 1962. They also made many appearances on television variety shows in Britain in the 1960s and recorded 14 albums. Though they never fully broke into the US market, they toured the United States in 1964 and were well-received at the Grand Ole Opry.

They continued to tour and record through the 1970s. Barbara ("Miki") died of cancer in 1989, aged 68, and Griff died in 1995, aged 72.

== Discography ==
=== Charting singles ===
- "Hold Back Tomorrow" (1959) UK No. 26
- "Rockin' Alone" (1960) UK No. 44
- "A Little Bitty Tear" (1962) UK No. 16
- "I Want to Stay Here" (1963) UK No. 23

=== Albums ===
- Miki And Griff, 1961
- Country Style, 1962
- Those Rocking Chair People, 1969
- Two Little Orphans, 1970
- The Country Side Of Miki & Griff, 1972
- Let The Rest Of The World Go By, 1973
- Golden Hour Of Miki & Griff, 1973
- Country Is Miki & Griff, 1974
- Two's Company, 1975
- This Is Miki, This Is Griff, 1976
- Etchings, 1977
- Rockin' Alone, 1977
- Country, 1978
- At Home With Miki & Griff, 1987
