= Ray Lynam =

Irish country music singer

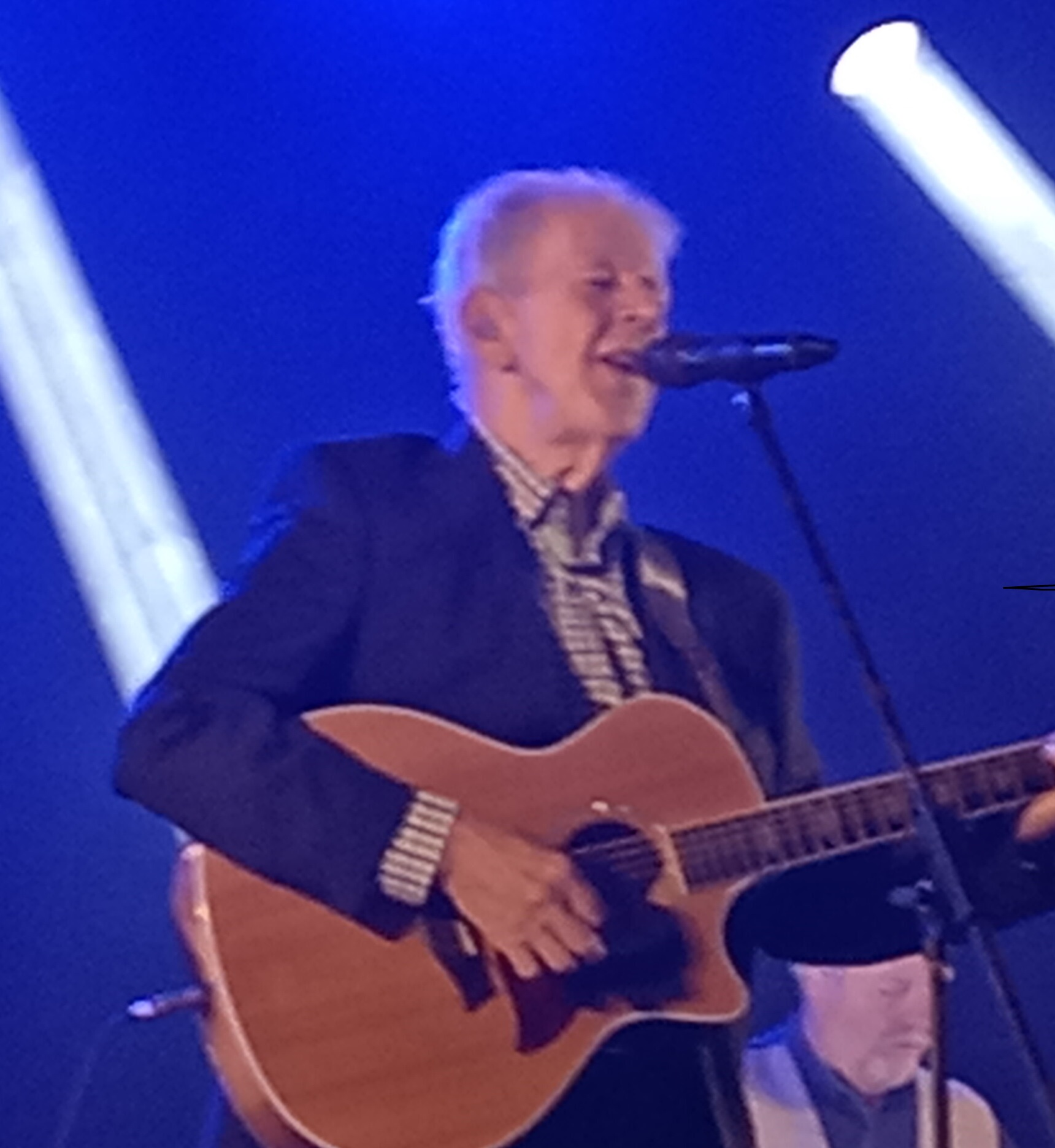
- Ray Lynam performing in Drumlish August 2023

Background information
- Born: 29 November 1951 (age 74); Moate, Westmeath, Ireland
- Genres: Country
- Occupation: Singer
- Instruments: Vocals, guitar
- Years active: 1969–present

Ray Lynam is an Irish country music singer, born on 29 November 1951 in Moate, County Westmeath.

== Career ==
Ray was born in Moate, County Westmeath to Patrick, a baker, and Nora, a shopkeeper. He was one of three sons, his brothers being Padraic and John. His first venture into the music scene was when he played saxophone for a local group "the Merrymen" while still attending the local Carmelite College Secondary School. By 1969 he had joined and was lead singer for the group Ray Lynam and the Hillbillies and had their first Irish Charts success with a cover of the Buck Owens song "Sweet Rosie Jones".

During the Wembley Country Music Festival of 1974, he teamed up with one of Irelands leading female country singers, Philomena Begley and went on to record many hit duets with her, including My Elusive Dreams in 1975.

== Style ==
Lynam's singing voice is closely modeled on those American country singers that influenced his early career, such as George Jones and Merle Haggard, rather than the more popular (in Ireland at that time) Country and Irish style. He has had hits on the Irish charts during the 1970s and 1980s with cover versions of some of their well-known tracks including He Stopped Loving Her Today and If We're Not Back in Love by Monday.

== Selected discography ==
=== Singles ===
- 1970 - "Busted" / "Heartaches by the Number"
- 1970 - "Sweet Rosie Jones"
- 1971 - "Gypsy Joe and Me"
- 1971 - "Will You Visit Me on Sunday?"
- 1971 - "Santa Looks a Lot Like Daddy"
- 1972 - "The Selfishness of Man" (IRE #14)
- 1972 - "Brand New Mister Me" (IRE #6)
- 1973 - "I Can't Believe That You've Stopped Loving Me" (IRE #12)
- 1973 - "You're the One I Can't Live Without" (with Philomena Begley) (IRE #5)
- 1973 - "Borrowed Angel" (IRE #8)
- 1974 - "Second Hand Flowers" (IRE #2)
- 1974 - "My Elusive Dreams" (with Philomena Begley) (IRE #3)
- 1975 - "The Door is Always Open" (IRE #9)
- 1975 - "I've Loved You All Over the World" (IRE #11)
- 1976 - "You're the One I Sing My Love Songs To" (IRE #5)
- 1977 - "Golden Ring"
- 1977 - "Wolverton Mountain"
- 1978 - "Sweet Music Man" (IRE #15)
- 1979 - "I Don't Want to See Another Town" (IRE #13)
- 1980 - "Shower the People"
- 1982 - "What a Lie" (IRE #18)
- 1983 - "He Stopped Loving Her Today" (IRE #17)
- 1983 - "Girls Women and Ladies"
- 1984 - "If We're Not Back in Love by Monday"
- 1985 - "Mona Lisa Lost Her Smile" (IRE #10)
- 1985 - "Fire of Two Old Flames" (with Philomena Begley)
- 1986 - "Too Late" / "Wintertime" (with Paul Cleary)
- 1986 - "To Be Lovers"
- 1988 - "Beautiful Woman"
- 1990 - "Hard Rock Bottom of Your Heart"
