= Philomena Begley =

- Born: 20 October 1942 (age 84); Pomeroy, County Tyrone, Northern Ireland
- Genres: Country, gospel country pop, country and Irish
- Occupation: Singer
- Instruments: Vocals
- Years active: 1962–present
- Labels: Dolphin Records, Top Spin, Release, Ritz, Prism Leisure, H&H

Philomena Begley (born 20 October 1942) is a country music singer from Northern Ireland, widely regarded as "Ireland’s Queen of Country". She rose to prominence in 1975 with her chart-topping version of "Blanket on the Ground", which outsold Billie Jo Spears’ original in both Ireland and the UK, reaching number Four and number One respectively.

Over the course of her career, Begley has toured internationally, recorded numerous duets with Ray Lynam, and performed at venues including the Grand Ole Opry and Carnegie Hall. In 2020, she became the first recipient inducted into the ICMA Hall of Fame.

== Background ==
Philomena Begley was born on 20 October 1942 and grew up in Pomeroy, County Tyrone, Northern Ireland. She was one of eight children. Before her break into music, she worked for six-and-a-half years at Fisher's Hat Factory in Cookstown.

== Career ==
Her first venture as a singer was with the popular Old Cross Céilí Band, with whom she sang as a dare, but stayed with the group. The group soon became known as the Old Cross Bandshow and released three records in Ireland in 1968 and 1969, but none made an impression in the chart. In September 1970, the band changed its name to The Country Flavour. Begley's first record following this became her first chart hit when "Here Today, Gone Tomorrow" reached number seven in the Irish chart. In 1974, she formed the Ramblin' Men, while the Country Flavour continued to tour with several other lead singers (including Eileen King and Dan O'Hara) during the 1970s.

Begley regularly toured with Ray Lynam from 1975 and they recorded many duets together, probably their most popular being "My Elusive Dreams", which went on to be mentioned in The Pogues' song, "A Pair of Brown Eyes".

In 1975, Begley had a hit with her version of Billie Jo Spears' hit song "Blanket on the Ground" which took her to number Four in the Irish chart and number One in the UK. Spears also released the song in the United Kingdom and in Ireland at the same time, but in Ireland, Begley's version received the highest sales, as Spears' version only went to number 11. The success of the single helped cement Begley's reputation as "Ireland’s Queen of Country", a title that has followed her throughout her career. She occasionally performed with Spears and later recorded a tribute song to her after the American star's death in 2011.

By 1977, she was undertaking a major tour of the United States, and in 1978, she was invited to sing at the Grand Ole Opry by Porter Wagoner. Since then, she has made multiple return visits to Nashville, been a guest of honour at the St. Patrick's Day parade in New York City, and performed at both the Grand Ole Opry and Carnegie Hall.

== Personal life ==
Begley is married to Tom Quinn, and they have three children: Mary, Aiden, and Carol, as well as five grandchildren. They live on a farm in Galbally, County Tyrone. Her son Aiden has established a singing career of his own, and her niece Andrea Begley won the BBC TV series The Voice UK in June 2013.

In 2017, she published her autobiography My Life, My Music, My Memories, co-written with Emma Heatherington, reflecting on her career, family life, and the challenges of touring during the Troubles.

=== Health ===
In 2019, Begley underwent heart surgery to have a valve replaced. In 2026, she fractured her knee after a fall on her birthday.

== Recognition ==
One of Begley's biggest fans is Irish singer Daniel O'Donnell, and he once said, "When Philomena sings a song you believe her... you feel that she's experienced every emotion she expresses."

In December 2020, she became the first recipient of the ICMA Hall of Fame award, presented during The Late Late Show Country Music Christmas Special.

In February 2023, Begley received Mid Ulster District Council's highest civic honour at a reception held at the Burnavon Arts Centre in Cookstown.

In March 2025, she was honoured at Áras an Uachtaráin, by then-President of Ireland, Michael D. Higgins, and his wife, Sabina Higgins.

In November 2026, Begley will receive the Life Achievement Award at the NI Music Prize in the Ulster Hall in Belfast.

== Discography ==
Albums

- 1972 – Truck Driving Woman (Release Records)
- 1973 – The Two of Us (with Ray Lynam) (Release)
- 1974 – Meet the Queen of Country Music (Top Spin Records)
- 1975 – The Best of Ray and Phil (with Ray Lynam) (Country Records)
- 1975 – Blanket on the Ground (Top Spin)
- 1976 – Irish Country Queen (Top Spin)
- 1976 – Queen of the Silver Dollar (Top Spin)
- 1977 – Truckin' Queen (Top Spin)
- 1978 – Nashville Country (Top Spin)
- 1979 – Fireside Country (Top Spin)
- 1979 – The Best of Philomena Begley (K-tel)
- 1980 – Philomena's Country (Top Spin)
- 1981 – My Kind of Country (Top Spin)
- 1983 – Country Scenes (K-tel)
- 1984 – You're in My Heart (Ritz Records)
- 1985 – Simply Divine (with Ray Lynam) (Ritz)
- 1987 – More About Love (Ritz)
- 1988 – Silver Anniversary Album (Ritz)
- 1991 – In Harmoney (Ritz)
- 1993 – Simply Divine (Ritz)
- 2002 – My Elusive Dreams (with Ray Lynam)(Prism Leisure Records)
- 2003 – Irlands Qeen
- 2004 – Once Around the Dancefloor (Prism Leisure)
- 2005 – Village
- 2007 – The Philomena Begley Collection (Voice Records)
- 2009 – The Way Old Friends Do
- 2009 – I'll Only Give This Up When It Gives Me Up
- 2013 – How I Love Them Old Songs (H&H Records)
- 2018 – From Then Till Now (H&H)
- 2022 – The Diamond Collection
