= Ember Records (US label) =

American independent record label

Ember Records was an independent record label in the United States, operated by Al Silver in New York City as the sister label to his Herald imprint.

Notable artists on the label included the Five Satins, who recorded the Fred Parris song "In the Still of the Night", and New Orleans saxophonist Lee Allen, known for his hit "Walking With Mr. Lee".

Both Herald and Ember ceased operations in the mid-1960s.
