= The Cleftones =

American vocal group

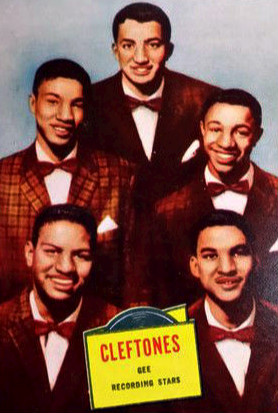
The group in 1957

The Cleftones was an American vocal group formed in 1955, which, at the time, was called The Silvertones at Junior High School 40 in Jamaica, Queens, New York City.

== Formation ==
In 1955, the members of the group were high school students attending Jamaica High School in Queens, New York. The group initially formed around the idea of writing a political campaign jingle for Jamaica High School's Independent Party, an unpopular group of students "made up of people who were typically also-rans in all the school activities", which included future members of The Cleftones. With this aim, Herbie Cox (lead singer), along with classmates Charlie James McGhee (first tenor), Berman Patterson (second tenor), Warren Corbin (bass) and William "Buzzy" McClane (baritone), changed the lyrics to "Gee", a then-popular rhythm-and-blues song by The Crows. Performing their version of "Gee" resulted in making the Independent Party popular and winning the school elections. The group began performing locally as "The Silvertones" in a variety of neighborhood concerts, such as at Hillcrest Jewish Center Day Camp in Queens. The hit song "Gee" was originally produced by "gruff music industry legend" George Goldner, who also signed the group, now renamed "The Cleftones", to a recording contract in 1955.

== Hits and recordings ==
In their first effort as professional musicians, Corbin and Patterson wrote "You Baby You", which became a hit in 1955. Herb Cox then wrote "Little Girl of Mine" and "Can't We Be Sweethearts" for the group. However, after a few minor hits ("Why You Do Me Like You Do" and "See You Next Year") their next major hits would not come until years later. In 1961 the second generation of The Cleftones included Herb Cox, Charlie James, Warren Corbin, Gene Pearson (baritone from The Rivileers who replaced baritone William "Buzzy" McClane) and new addition Pat Spann, the first and only female to sing with the group. In 1961 they reached No. 18 on the Billboard Hot 100 chart with "Heart and Soul", a rearrangement of the 1938 song of the same name (a No. 1 by Larry Clinton and his orchestra, with Bea Wain on vocals). The group followed that song with "For Sentimental Reasons" (1962), a rearrangement of a 1936 song of the same name. However, the British Invasion of the mid-1960s took the audiences of The Cleftones and other doo-wop groups. Gene Pearson left to sing with The Drifters from 1962 to 1966. The Cleftones broke up in 1964, three years after their "Heart and Soul" greatest success.

In 2000, tenor Berman Patterson characterized his experience with The Cleftones:

It seemed like everybody and his brother had a singing group back in the '50s. I think we caught on because we didn't have that stereotypical rhythm-and-blues sound. We were bubblegum. Something bouncing and refreshing. But I'll tell you this: Once you got popular, you were expected to work. I can remember playing five shows a night at the Apollo Theater. We went on every hour and were paid $500 to split five ways.

Lead singer Herb Cox (born Herbert Alexander Cox, May 6, 1938-December 7, 2019) died in Fayetteville, Georgia, at the age of 81.

Berman Patterson died on October 1, 2023, at the age of 85. Warren Corbin died in 1978

== Songs featured in selected films ==
- "Can't We Be Sweethearts" appeared in the film Goodfellas.
- "Heart and Soul" appeared in the films American Graffiti, Mischief and Family Guy.
- "Little Girl of Mine" appeared in the film A Bronx Tale.
- "Lover Boy" appeared in the film Drive.
- "My Angel Lover" appeared in the film Susie Q.
