= The Five Satins =

American doo-wop group

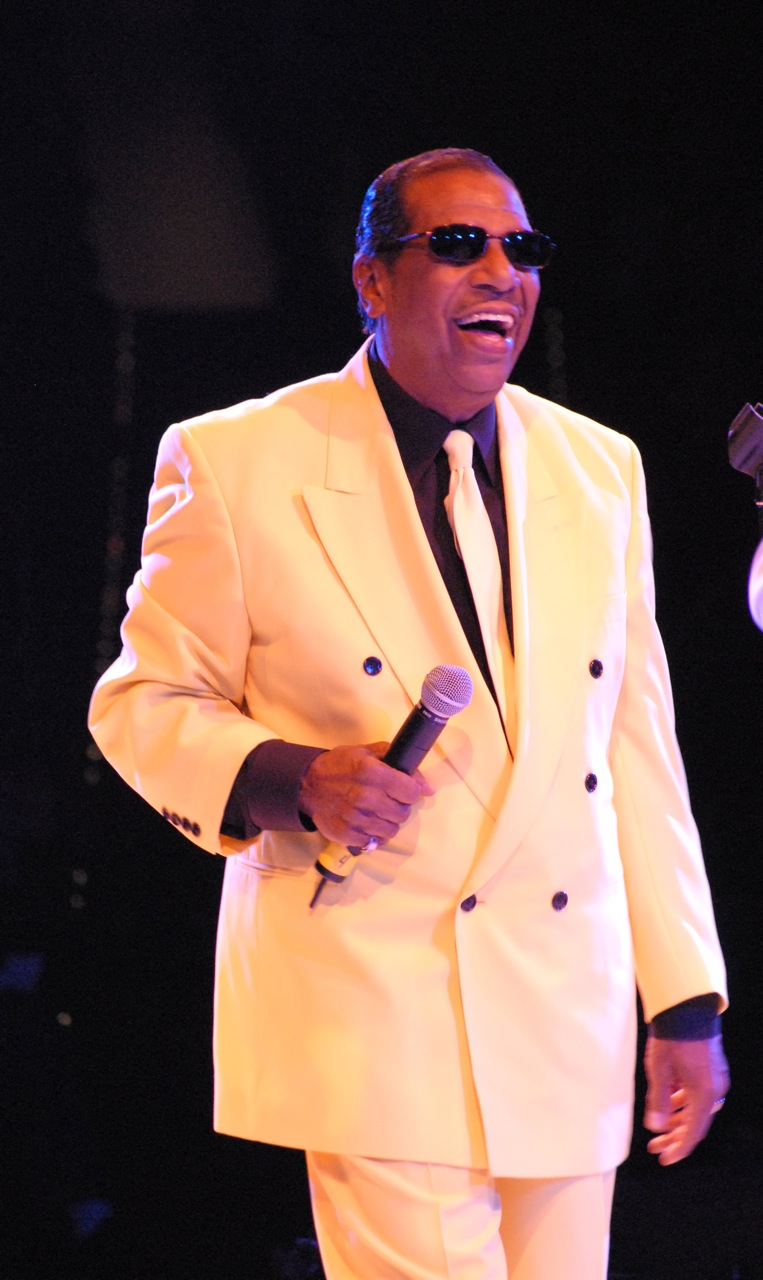
- Fred Parris in 2007

Background information
- Also known as: Fred Parris and the Scarlets, Fred Parris and the Restless Hearts, Fred Parris and the Five Satins, 5 Satins, The Wildwoods, The New Yorkers, Black Satin, Billy Baker and the Satins, The Five Satins featuring Freddie Parris, The Five Satins featuring Fred Parris
- Origin: New Haven, Connecticut, United States
- Genre: Doo-wop
- Years active: 1954–present
- Members: Richie Freeman; Eugene Dobbs; Bonita Brooks; Pat Marafiote; James Moore; Gregory Borino; Jerry Langley
- Past members: Fred Parris; Lou Peeples; Larry DiSalvi; Stanley Dortche; Ed Martin; Jim Freeman; Al Denby; Tommy Killebrew; Jessie Murphy; Chris DeRosa; Bill Baker; Sylvester Hopkins; Wes Forbes; Corky Rogers; Jimmy Curtis; Nate Marshall; Nadina Perry; Mychael Ross; Cleaven Johnson; Richard Bogan

The Five Satins are an American doo-wop group, best known for their 1956 million-selling song "In the Still of the Night." They were formed in 1954 and continued performing until 1994. When it was formed, the group consisted of six members, which was eventually cut down to five. The group is in the Vocal Group Hall of Fame.

== Career ==
The group, formed in New Haven, Connecticut in 1954, consisted of leader Fred Parris (March 26, 1936 – January 13, 2022), Lewis Peeples, Stanley Dortche, Ed Martin, Jim Freeman, Nat Mosley. With little success, the group reorganized, with Dortche and Peeples leaving, and new member Al Denby entering. The group then recorded "In the Still of the Night", a big hit in the United States, which was originally released as the B-side to the single "The Jones Girl". The single was initially issued on the tiny local "Standord" label (45 stock 200) and after some local Connecticut sales, it was released the following year on the New York label Ember (45 stock 1005), and "In the Still of the Night" ended up charting at number three on the R&B chart and number 24 on the pop chart.

Two singles later, the follow-up track "Pretty Baby (That's Why I Sing)" (Ember 1025) got weeks of airplay on powerful CHUM in Toronto, in November 1957. The August 1958 release "A Night to Remember" (Ember 1038) got some Boston airplay. During late 1959 (in San Francisco) and early 1960 (in both San Antonio, Texas and Rochester, New York), their classic 45 side garnered renewed current airplay, becoming a Top 10 hit in all three listed markets. "In the Still of the Night" became an even bigger hit when it appeared as the lead track on Original Sound Records' Oldies But Goodies Vol. 1. The series eventually ran to 15 volumes. The series has been in continual print in one form or another since that first volume was released in 1959. In total, their signature track sold over 1 million copies and was awarded a gold disc.

A case of painfully bad timing affected the group's lead singer. Parris entered the United States Army soon after the success of "In the Still of the Night", forcing the group to reorganize again, with Martin, Freeman, Tommy Killebrew, Jessie Murphy and new lead Bill Baker. Baker quickly proved to be a highly capable replacement as this lineup immediately had success with Billy Dawn Smith's "To the Aisle" (Ember 1019), in September 1957.

They appeared in the film Sweet Beat (1959).

Upon Parris' return from the Army, a new lineup was assembled, consisting of Parris, Lewis Peeples (who was in a previous incarnation of the Five Satins), Sylvester Hopkins, Richie Freeman and Wes Forbes. The group would be briefly known as "Fred Parris and the Scarlets", until the Baker-led group split up. At this point, they reverted to the Five Satins name. According to old radio survey repository ARSA, the following 45 sides charted in some markets: "I'll Be Seeing You" (Ember 1061); "Your Memory" (Cub 9071); "The Time" (Ember 1066); "These Foolish Things/A Beggar With a Dream" (Cub 9077); "Till the End" (United Artists 368); "The Masquerade Is Over" (Chancellor 1110); "Remember Me" (Warner Brothers 5367); and "Ain't Gonna Dance" (aka "Ain't Gonna Cry", Roulette 4563). In total, the group appeared on an unusually high number of record labels, even for their era.

In 1965, Parris retooled his band and started a three-year run of getting substantial airplay almost exclusively inside his home state of Connecticut, as Fred Parris and the Restless Hearts. Songs included "No Use in Crying" (Checker 1108); "Blushing Bride/Giving My Love to You" (Green-Sea 106); "Bring It Home to Daddy" (Atco 6439); "I'll Be Hangin' On" (Green-Sea 107); and ending this career phase with an updated version of their classic hit, "(I'll Remember) In the Still of the Night '67" (Mama Sadie 1001).

By the early 1970s, the group was Parris, Peeples, Richie Freeman, Jimmy Curtis and Corky Rogers. "Dark at the Top of My Heart" (RCA 0478) had garnered them still more Connecticut airplay. With the 1973 film American Graffiti and its nostalgic soundtrack sparking a renewed interest in both old hits and old groups, music mogul Don Kirshner sought to capitalize by signing Parris and his group to his own Kirshner label. He restored the group's moniker back to Five Satins, and released two 45s: "Very Precious Oldies/You Are Love" (Kirshner 4251), 1973; and "Two Different Worlds/Love Is Such a Beautiful Thing" (Kirshner 4252), 1974. Both singles flopped.

They continued recording into the 1980s, with Parris, Richie Freeman, Curtis and Nate Marshall. In 1982, a "Medley Craze" had suddenly engulfed Top 40 radio, led by the "Stars on 45" medley. Noticing this new trend, however, longtime Connecticut music producer Marty Markiewicz (who had known Parris personally for many years), who was working for Elektra Records at the time, got an idea. He was given permission by his employer to bring Parris and company in to record/produce a medley of the 1950s hits.

The result was "Memories of Days Gone By" (Elektra 47411), which became the group's first new entry on the Billboard Hot 100 since 1960. In response to their successful medley, Elektra requested a full album. For this release, the "Five" was dropped, and the album was issued as by "Fred Parris and The Satins." Two more singles were released from it. The first, a remake of the Delfonics' 1970 hit "Didn't I (Blow Your Mind This Time)" (Elektra 69888), again got solid airplay in New Haven, in November 1982.

Meanwhile, Bill Baker had started his own Five Satins group around this same time, with former Satin Sylvester Hopkins and Hopkins' brothers Arthur "Count" Hopkins, Sr. and Frank. By the late 1980s, this group consisted of Baker, Harvey Potts, Jr., Anthony Hofler and Octavio DeLeon. In 1990, the group was joined by Jimmie Wilson stepping into the first tenor position for Don Simpson.

== Awards and recognition ==
In 2003, the Five Satins were inducted into the Vocal Group Hall of Fame.

== Present day ==
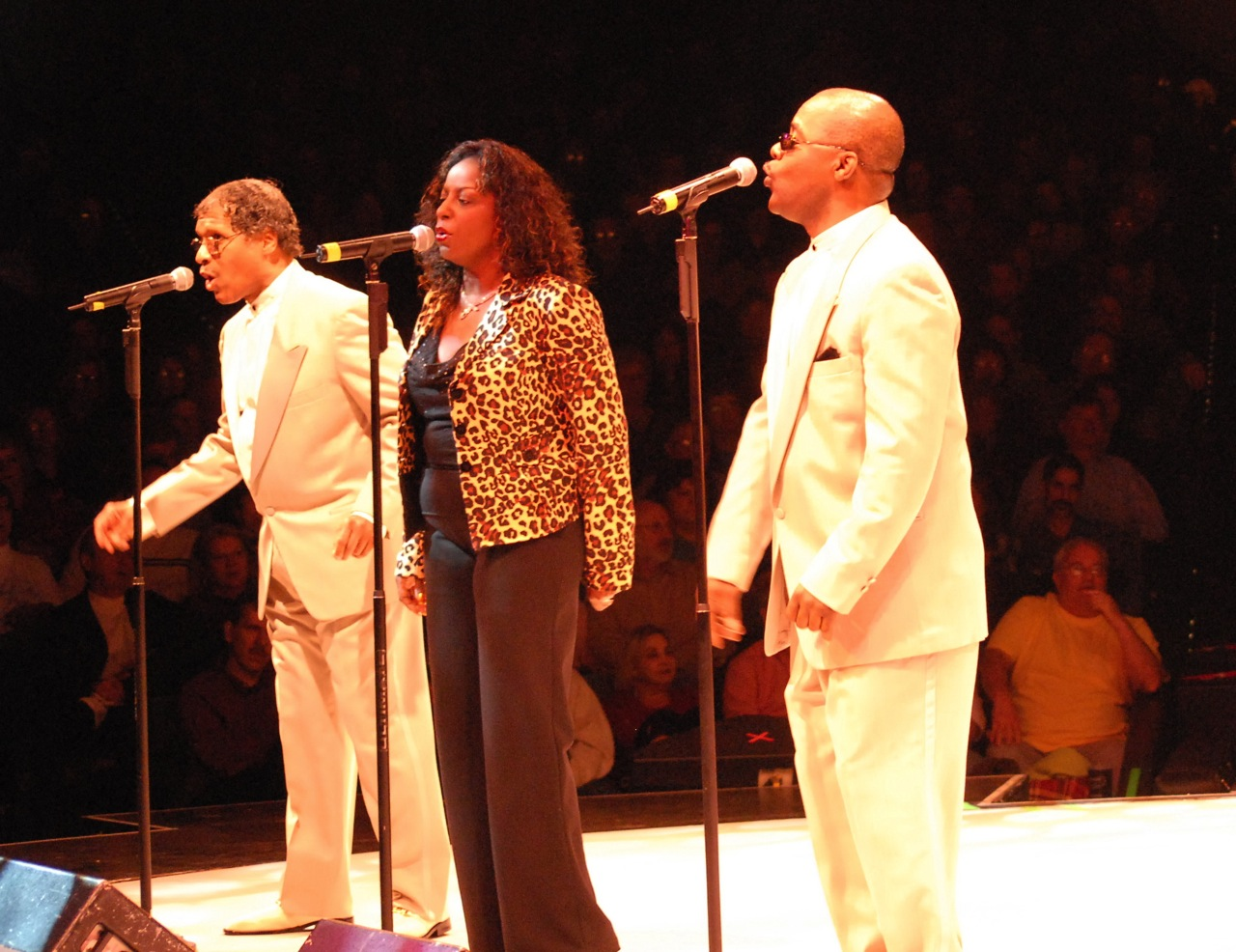
Satins - Freeman, Perry and Dobbs.

James Curtis, one of the original members of the Five Satins, worked in the cafeteria at the University of New Haven before his death in 2001.

Jim Freeman lives in Norwalk, Iowa and owns a pest control company.

Wes Forbes was a psychologist in California, employed by Alliant International University as a training director. He received four degrees, culminating in a Doctor of Education from the University of Massachusetts. Dr. Forbes appeared on a 1984 episode of Name That Tune.

Richie Freeman is the house sound engineer at New York's famed Iridium Jazz Club.

Lewis Peeples, an original member of the group, began working as an International Representative at AFSCME in 1974, retiring as an International Union area director in 2007. He was a mediator and facilitator championing workers' rights while headquartered at various times in Washington, D.C.; New Orleans; and Atlanta.

== Deaths ==
- Bill Baker died on August 10, 1994, at the age of 58.
- Stanley Dortche died on October 2, 2010, at the age of 73.
- Lewis Edward Peeples died on December 13, 2020, in Alpharetta, Georgia, at the age of 83.
- Fred Parris died on January 13, 2022, at the age of 85.
- Wes Forbes died at his home in Fresno, California on June 21, 2025, at the age of 86.

== Singles ==
Year	Titles (A-side, B-side) All records shown as "(The) Five Satins" except as noted	Chart positions		Album
Year	Titles (A-side, B-side) All records shown as "(The) Five Satins" except as noted	US	US R&B	Album
1955	"All Mine" b/w "Rose Mary"	—	—	Non-album tracks
1956	"In the Still of the Night" b/w "The Jones Girl"	24	3	The 5 Satins Sing
1956	"Wonderful Girl" b/w "Weeping Willow"	—	—	The 5 Satins Sing
1957	"Oh Happy Day" b/w "Our Love Is Forever"	—	—	The 5 Satins Sing
1957	"To the Aisle" b/w "Wish I Had My Baby"	25	5	The 5 Satins Sing
1957	"Our Anniversary" b/w "Pretty Baby (That's Why I Sing)"	—	—	The 5 Satins Sing
1958	"A Million To One" b/w "Love with No Love in Return"	—	—	Encore
1958	"A Night to Remember" b/w "Senorita Lolita"; Fred Parris and the Satins	—	—	Encore
1959	"When You Love Comes Along" b/w "Skippity Doo"	112	—	Non-album tracks
1959	"Shadows" b/w "Toni My Love"; 5 Satins	87	27	Encore
1959	"(I'll Remember) In the Still of the Night" b/w "The Jones Girl"; Chart reentry	81	—	The 5 Satins Sing
1960	"She's Gone (With the Wind)" b/w "(Somewhere) A Voice Is Calling"; Fred Parris and the Five Satins	—	—	Non-album tracks
1960	"I'll Be Seeing You" b/w "A Night Like This"	22	14	Encore
1960	"Your Memory" b/w "I Didn't Know"	107	—	Non-album tracks
1960	"The Time" b/w "Candlelight"	—	—	Encore
1960	"A Beggar with a Dream" b/w "These Foolish Things"	—	—	Non-album tracks
1961	"Wishing Ring" b/w "Tell Me Dear"	—	—	Non-album tracks
1961	"Golden Earrings" b/w "Can I Come Over Tonight"	—	—	Non-album tracks
1961	"Till The End" b/w "On a Lover's Island"	—	—	Non-album tracks
1961	"(I'll Remember) In the Still of the Night" b/w "The Jones Girl"; Chart reentry	99	—	The 5 Satins Sing
1962	"To the Aisle" b/w "Just to Be Near You"	—	—	Non-album tracks
1962	"The Masquerade Is Over" b/w "Raining in My Heart"	102	—	Non-album tracks
1962	"Downtown" b/w "Do You Remember"	—	—	Non-album tracks
1963	"Kangaroo" b/w "Remember Me"	—	—	Non-album tracks
1964	"You Can Count On Me" b/w "Ain't Gonna Cry"	—	—	Non-album tracks
1971	"Dark at the Top of My Heart" b/w "Summer in New York (Wander with the Wind)"; The Five Satins featuring Freddie Parris	—	—	Non-album tracks
1973	"All Mine" b/w "The Voice"; 5 Satins	—	—	Non-album tracks
1973	"Very Precious Oldies (Welcome Back Home)" b/w "You Are Love"; The Five Satins featuring Fred Parris	—	—	Non-album tracks
1974	"Two Different Worlds" b/w "Love Is Such a Beautiful Thing (Memories)"; The Five Satins featuring Fred Parris	—	—	Non-album tracks
1982	"Memories of Days Gone By" Medley^{A} b/w "Loving You (Would Be the Sweetest Thing)"; Fred Parris and the Five Satins	71	—	Fred Parris and The Satins
1982	"I'll Be Seeing You" b/w "Loving You (Would Be the Sweetest Thing)"; Fred Parris and the Satins	—	—	Fred Parris and The Satins
1982	"Didn't I (Blow Your Mind)" b/w "Loving You (Would Be the Sweetest Thing)"; Fred Parris and the Satins	—	—	Fred Parris and The Satins
1989	"Everybody's Got a Home but Me" (The Five Satins featuring Fred Parris) b/w "Heartache" (Fred Parris solo)	—	—	Non-album tracks

- ^{A}"Memories of Days Gone By" Also Peaked at No. 32 on Adult Contemporary Singles.
