= Woodstock: Three Days of Peace and Music =

Live album by Various artists
- Released: August 9, 1994
- Recorded: August 15–18, 1969 at Woodstock Festival, Bethel, NY
- Genre: Rock
- Label: Atlantic Records

Woodstock albums chronology
The Best of Woodstock (1994)	Woodstock: Three Days of Peace and Music (1994)	Woodstock Diary (1994)

Woodstock: Three Days of Peace and Music is a 4-CD live box-set album of the 1969 Woodstock Festival in Bethel, New York. Its release marked the 25th anniversary of the festival. The box set contains tracks from Woodstock: Music from the Original Soundtrack and More, Woodstock 2, and numerous additional, previously unreleased performances from the festival as well as the stage announcements and crowd noises. Just prior to the box set's release, Atlantic Records released a much shorter 1-CD version entitled The Best of Woodstock. In 2019, Rhino Records issued a 38-CD box set called Woodstock – Back to the Garden: The Definitive 50th Anniversary Archive which includes every musical performance as well as stage announcements and other ancillary material.

== Track listing ==
=== Disc one ===
1. Richie Havens – "Handsome Johnny" (Havens) *
2. Richie Havens – "Freedom (Motherless Child)" (traditional, adapted by Havens)
3. Country Joe McDonald – "The "Fish" Cheer/I-Feel-Like-I'm-Fixin'-to-Die Rag" (McDonald)
4. John B. Sebastian – "Rainbows All Over Your Blues" (Sebastian)
5. John B. Sebastian – "I Had a Dream" (Sebastian)
6. Tim Hardin – "If I Were a Carpenter" (Hardin) *
7. Melanie – "Beautiful People" (Melanie Safka)
8. Arlo Guthrie – "Coming into Los Angeles" (Guthrie)
9. Arlo Guthrie – "Walkin' Down the Line" (Bob Dylan) *
10. Joan Baez – "Joe Hill" (Earl Robinson, Alfred Hayes)
11. Joan Baez – "Sweet Sir Galahad" (Baez)
12. Joan Baez featuring Jeffrey Shurtleff – "Drug Store Truck Drivin' Man" (Roger McGuinn, Gram Parsons)
13. Santana – "Soul Sacrifice" (Carlos Santana, Gregg Rolie, José Areas, Michael Carabello, David Brown, Michael Shrieve)
14. Mountain – "Blood of the Sun" (Leslie West, Felix Pappalardi, Gail Collins)
15. Mountain – "Theme for an Imaginary Western" (Jack Bruce, Pete Brown)

=== Disc two ===
1. Canned Heat – "Leaving This Town" (Adolfo "Fito" de la Parra, Harvey Mandel, Larry Taylor) *
2. Canned Heat – "Going Up the Country" (Alan Wilson)
3. Creedence Clearwater Revival – "Commotion" (John Fogerty) *
4. Creedence Clearwater Revival – "Green River" (Fogerty) *
5. Creedence Clearwater Revival – "Ninety Nine and a Half (Won't Do)" (Wilson Pickett, Steve Cropper, Eddie Floyd) *
6. Creedence Clearwater Revival – "I Put a Spell on You" (Screamin' Jay Hawkins) *
7. Janis Joplin – "Try" (Jerry Ragovoy, Chip Taylor) *
8. Janis Joplin – "Work Me, Lord" (traditional) *
9. Janis Joplin – "Ball and Chain" (Big Mama Thornton) *
10. Sly and the Family Stone – Medley: "Dance to the Music" / "Music Lover" / "I Want to Take You Higher" (Sylvester Stewart)
11. The Who – "We're Not Gonna Take It" (Pete Townshend)

=== Disc three ===
1. Jefferson Airplane – "Volunteers" (Paul Kantner, Marty Balin)
2. Jefferson Airplane – "Somebody to Love" (Darby Slick) *
3. Jefferson Airplane – "Saturday Afternoon/Won't You Try" (Kantner)
4. Jefferson Airplane – "Uncle Sam Blues" (Jorma Kaukonen) *
5. Jefferson Airplane – "White Rabbit" (Grace Slick) *
6. Joe Cocker – "Let's Go Get Stoned" (Nickolas Ashford, Valerie Simpson) *
7. Joe Cocker – "With a Little Help from My Friends" (John Lennon, Paul McCartney)
8. Country Joe and the Fish – "Rock & Soul Music" (McDonald, Barry Melton, Chicken Hirsh, Bruce Barthol, Dave Cohen)
9. Ten Years After – "I'm Going Home" (Alvin Lee)
10. The Band – "Long Black Veil" (Marijohn Wilkin, Danny Dill) *
11. The Band – "Loving You Is Sweeter Than Ever" (Stevie Wonder, Ivy Jo Hunter) *
12. The Band – "The Weight" (Robbie Robertson) *
13. Johnny Winter – "Mean Town Blues" (Winter) *

=== Disc four ===
1. Crosby, Stills & Nash – "Suite: Judy Blue Eyes" (Stephen Stills)
2. Crosby, Stills, Nash & Young – "Guinnevere" (David Crosby)
3. Crosby, Stills, Nash & Young – "Marrakesh Express" (Graham Nash)
4. Crosby, Stills, Nash & Young – "4 + 20" (Stills)
5. Crosby, Stills, Nash & Young – "Sea of Madness" (Neil Young)
6. Crosby, Stills & Nash – "Find the Cost of Freedom" (Stills) *
7. Paul Butterfield Blues Band – "Love March" (Gene Dinwiddie, Phillip Wilson)
8. Sha Na Na – "At the Hop" (Artie Singer, John Medora, David White)
9. Jimi Hendrix – "Voodoo Child (Slight Return)" / "Stepping Stone" (Hendrix) *
10. Jimi Hendrix – "The Star-Spangled Banner" (traditional, arranged by Hendrix)
11. Jimi Hendrix – "Purple Haze"(Hendrix)

[*] Previously unreleased
