= The Secrets =

American girl group

The Secrets were an American girl group from Cleveland, Ohio.

The group first performed under the name The Sonnets, named after the Sonnet manufactured piano. They were offered a local gig supporting local ensemble the Starfires (later the Outsiders), and at one of these performances, talent scout Redda Robbins offered them a contract. The group then met with songwriters Johnny Madara and David White, later members of The Spokesmen. Through their influence, the group was able to release a single on Philips Records called "The Boy Next Door"; the song hit number 18 on the US Billboard Hot 100 in December 1963. They were booked to appear on American Bandstand the weekend of November 22, 1963, which was cancelled due to John F. Kennedy's assassination, and they were the last group to appear on American Bandstand in the spring of 1964, before it moved home from Philadelphia to Los Angeles. Three more singles followed on Philips, but none of them charted, and the group parted ways in 1965.

Members Patty Miller and Carole McGoldrick continued performing as the Memories for a year following the breakup. The group reunited in the early 1990s to play at their high school reunion. They later reunited for a "Pride of Cleveland Past" Concert at the Parmatown Rib Burnoff in the early 2000s. Carole McGoldrick died on June 16, 2010.

== Members ==
- Jackie Allen Schwegler (born 1943)
- Karen Gray Cipriani (born 1943)
- Carole Raymont McGoldrick (1943–2010)
- Patty Miller (born 1943)
