= John Bartram High School =

Location
- 2401 South 67th Street; Philadelphia, Pennsylvania 19142; United States

Information
- Type: Public secondary
- Established: 1939
- School district: The School District of Philadelphia
- Principal: Brian R. Johnson
- Staff: 37.60 (FTE)
- Grades: 9–12
- Enrollment: 526 (2023–2024)
- Student to teacher ratio: 13.99
- Colors: Maroon and gray
- Mascot: Brave
- Website: https://bartram.philasd.org/
- Bartram, John, High School
- U.S. National Register of Historic Places
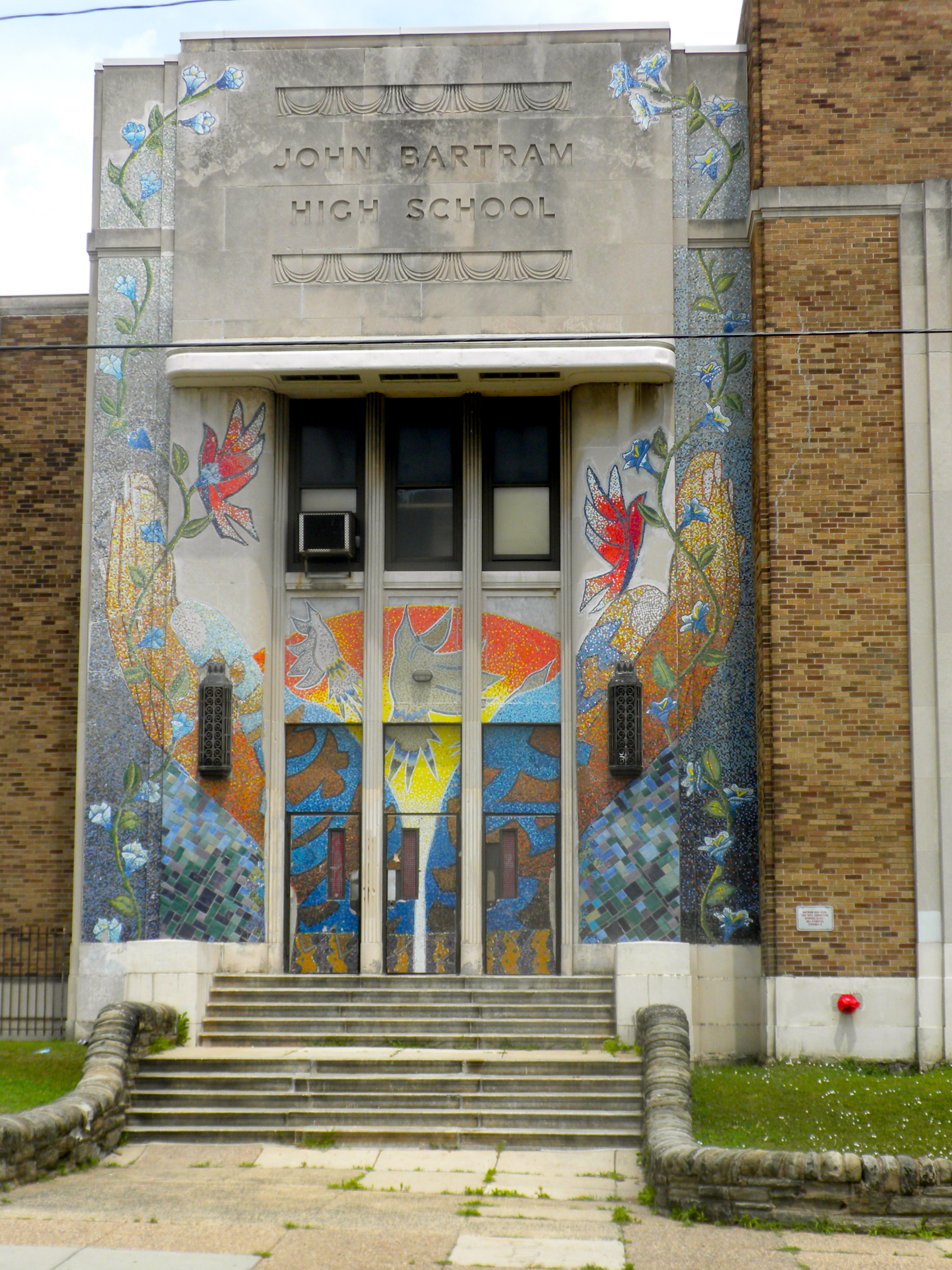

- Location within Philadelphia Location within Pennsylvania Location within the United States
- Location: Philadelphia, Pennsylvania
- Coordinates: 39°55′18″N 75°14′02″W
- Built: 1937
- Architect: Catharine, Irwin T.; McCloskey & Co.
- Architectural style: Moderne
- MPS: Philadelphia Public Schools TR
- NRHP reference No.: 86003263
- Added to NRHP: December 4, 1986

John Bartram High School is a public secondary school serving the neighborhoods of the Southwest Philadelphia area of Philadelphia, Pennsylvania. The school, which serves grades 9 through 12, is part of the School District of Philadelphia.

On December 4, 1986, it was added to the National Register of Historic Places.

== History ==
On February 5, 1939, John Bartram High School, located at the intersection of 67th Street and Elmwood Avenue in Southwest Philadelphia, opened to 1,700 students for the first time. The school was named after the Philadelphian botanist John Bartram. It was built to relieve overcrowding at West Philadelphia High School due to population growth in the southwest part of the city. According to a history of the school published on its 50th anniversary, the school was originally planned to be built at 74th Street and Dicks Avenue, but the site was changed before construction started.

It was one of the first Philadelphia high schools named for a prominent individual rather than a geographic region of the city.

The school is home to the PA-20032 Unit of the Air Force JROTC.

== School and site structure ==
=== Structure ===
The building is one city block long, and the school's capacity is about 3000 students. The school's blueprint shows approximately 103 classrooms and 12 staircases. The school has a boys' and a girls' gymnasium for different sporting events. The auditorium can hold about 1077 people. The Art Deco building was designed for 2,750 students but frequently held 3,200 or more.

=== Curriculum ===
John Bartram students must take four English classes to graduate. English classes are designed to help students improve their reading, grammar, writing, and vocabulary. Optional English classes include SAT English, AP English, Theater, Public Speaking, and AP English Literature.

== Feeder Schools ==
- Joseph W. Catharine School
- Benjamin B. Comegys School
- William Longstreth School
- Thomas D. Morton School
- John M. Patterson School
- Penrose School
- William T. Tilden Middle School
- S. Weir Mitchell Elementary School

== Notable alumni ==
- Michael Blackson (born 1972) Comedian, Actor, Philanthropist
- William Bonsall (1923–2015), Olympic gymnast
- Joe Bryant (1954-2024), basketball player who played in the NBA for the Philadelphia 76ers
- Solomon Burke (1936 or 1940–2010), musician
- Bernie Custis (1928–2017), football player
- Mary Jane Fonder (1942–2018), convicted murderer
- Tyrone Garland (born 1992), basketball player
- Wilson Goode (born 1938), former mayor of Philadelphia
- DJ Jazzy Jeff (born 1965), musician
- Chris Kefalos (1945–2022), Greek-American basketball player
- Patti LaBelle (born 1944), singer, actress
- David Martin (born 1959), former gridiron football cornerback who played in the National Football League, Canadian Football League, and United States Football League
- Earl Monroe (born 1944), basketball player who played in the NBA for the New York Knicks.
- Connie Morgan (1935–1996), professional baseball player
- Ann A. Mullen (1935–1994), politician who served as mayor of Gloucester Township, New Jersey, and represented New Jersey's 4th legislative district in the New Jersey General Assembly.
- Danny Rapp (1941–1983), Frank Maffei (1939-2025), Joe Terranova (1941-2019), and David White (1939–2019), doo-wop group Danny & the Juniors
- Irvin "Bo" Roberson (1935–2001), football player, track athlete
- Al-Hajj Shabazz (born 1992), American football cornerback who played in the NFL for the Pittsburgh Steelers.
- Jimmy Wilkes (1925–2008), major league baseball outfielder in the Negro National League
- Erik Williams (born 1968), football player
- Frank Wolf (born 1939), Congressman for Virginia's 10th district
