= Lance Williams and Mark Fainaru-Wada =

American sportswriters

Lance Williams and Mark Fainaru-Wada co-authored the book Game of Shadows while they were reporters for the San Francisco Chronicle. For their investigative work in the field of steroids, Williams and Fainaru-Wada were given the 2004 George Polk Award.

In the course of their investigative research, Williams and Fainaru-Wada were the first to report that:

- track star Marion Jones purportedly received illegal drugs from the steroid supplier BALCO
- world record-holder Tim Montgomery testified before a federal grand jury that he had used steroids
- baseball slugger Jason Giambi testified that he had used steroids

On May 5, 2006, Fainaru-Wada and Williams were subpoenaed to testify before a federal grand jury about how they obtained leaked grand jury testimony. On May 31, the authors urged United States District Judge Martin Jenkins of San Francisco to excuse them from testifying. This appeal was supported by affidavits from Washington Post reporters Carl Bernstein and Mark Corallo, a former press secretary to former Attorney General John Ashcroft, but was denied on August 15, 2006.

On September 21, 2006, after refusing to comply with the subpoena, the journalists were sentenced to 18 months in prison for contempt of court. The two have repeatedly stated that they would go to prison before revealing their sources. The two avoided jail time, however, when attorney Troy Ellerman pleaded guilty on February 14, 2007, to leaking the information, lying to prosecutors, obstructing justice and disobeying a court order not to disclose grand jury information. The two reporters were awarded the 2007 Dick Schaap Award for Outstanding Journalism.

Fainaru-Wada left the Chronicle in November 2007 to join ESPN. In August 2009, Williams left the Chronicle for California Watch, a new West Coast division of the Center for Investigative Reporting.

== Grand jury subpoena ==
=== Forced to testify ===
On August 15, 2006, as part of United States v. Fainaru-Wada, 06-90225, U.S. District Judge Jeffrey White ordered Fainaru-Wada and Williams to comply with their subpoenas and testify, saying that, if they do not, they would be held in contempt and incarcerated until such time as they decide to talk or if the grand jury expires and has to be thrown out. They may also be freed from this obligation if a higher court reverses the ruling. The reporters had previously stated that they would rather go to jail than testify.

=== Controversy ===
Following Judge White's decision to uphold the subpoena, public controversy stirred concerning whether or not the two reporters should be forced to reveal their sources. While many contend that confidential sources have been utilized by the press since the beginning of its existence, others believe that by not revealing their confidential sources, Fainaru-Wada and Williams are, in effect, obstructing justice and should be punished accordingly.

Those who believe that confidential sources are necessary in reporting often point to the work of Bob Woodward and Carl Bernstein of The Washington Post and their mysterious source, "Deep Throat," to whom they refer several times in their articles detailing the Watergate scandal.

In an affidavit, California Attorney General Bill Lockyer stated that, "To jail a journalist because he protected his source is an assault not only on the press, but on Californians as well."

Eve Burton, who has been the Hearst Corporation lawyer for the two reporters, said, "I think that they [Fainaru-Wada and Williams] have the constitutional right to protect their sources. I think law-enforcement's interest in determining who leaked the information to the press has to be balanced against the significant public-reporting that these guys did. Without the laws that have protected journalists for the past thirty years," she contended, "We wouldn't have had Watergate, we wouldn't have had BALCO, and we won't have the next government corruption case that comes along. That's the importance to the public in this. The reporters [must] be able to provide public information, and without the use of confidential sources -- carefully conceived, properly used -- we will not learn about important matters that involve our government."

Lance Williams also expressed a similar concern, saying, "As far as the government coming after us, the world has changed since this story was published. In [the days of Woodward and Bernstein], the government was not going around the country subpoenaing reporters. This is a very new development. It's really an innovation of the current Attorney General, as far as I can tell. But the number of reporters subpoenaed in the past decade is not very great. And the number subpoenaed recently is a large proportion of the number subpoenaed in the past 20 to 25 years. We didn't know we were risking jail, we thought [the government] would try to find out the sources, but we really did not anticipate that it would get to this point. Because as a matter of practice, that wasn't what they were doing in those days."

On January 18, 2007, John Conyers and Tom Davis sent Alberto Gonzales a letter asking him to withdraw the subpoenas.

== Government motivation ==
On August 21, 2006, in an interview with Forrest Wilkinson of RealGM, Lance Williams was quoted as saying, "We always thought there was a disconnect between the government's interest in steroid use. There's no question that the people who put the case [against BALCO] together bent over backwards to protect the users of the drugs, first they condoned their use of illegal drugs, then they excised all of their names from the court filings. It goes on to this day -- this attempt to protect these wealthy athletes."

Fainaru-Wada also questioned the government's motives, "You have these high-profile athletes, multi-million dollar athletes in some cases, who were the users of the drugs and, wanting to clean up sports," he contended, "[Congress] probably [should] expose those people, and yet, all those athletes are protected and their names were hidden from public file, or retracted by using generic names such as 'A Major League Baseball player', 'an NFL player', those types of things."

== Criticism ==
=== Profit from book ===
After having published Game of Shadows, it has become a topic for debate as to whether it should be acceptable to profit from material illegally disclosed to them. Both Fainaru-Wada and Williams claim that they have received little-to-no profit from their book, to this point. "We haven't seen anything from royalties yet. All I can say is, we're not getting rich, we're not retiring, we're not buying new houses, we're not buying mansions or anything like that. I'm not going to change my status (Laughs). And I would just say, even if it did, it's not relevant. I didn't do this for the money, Lance didn't do this for the money; we did this because we love reporting, because this is a great story, and because it's an important one, and that's why we did it," Fainaru-Wada said in the RealGM article. He also remarked, "Lance has a 'semi-joke' that, he did the math, and he makes, in a year, as a reporter for the Chronicle, what [Barry] Bonds makes in three innings." Williams went even further, saying that they had actually received an advance-payment so that they could afford to take time off work to write Game of Shadows.
