= 1948–49 Drexel Dragons men's basketball team =

American college basketball season

1948–49 Drexel Dragons men's basketball
- Conference: Middle Atlantic States Collegiate Athletic Conference
- Southern
- Record: 12–4 (7–3 MASCAC)
- Head coach: Ralph Chase (3rd season)
- Assistant coach: Bud Bossick (1st season)
- Home arena: Curtis Hall Gym

The 1948–49 Drexel Dragons men's basketball team represented Drexel Institute of Technology during the 1948–49 men's basketball season. The Dragons, led by 3rd year head coach Ralph Chase, played their home games at Curtis Hall Gym and were members of the Southern division of the Middle Atlantic States Collegiate Athletic Conference (MASCAC).

During the end of the 1948–49 season, a new playoff system was implemented for the conference where the top 4 teams in the league standings would play in a tournament at the conclusion of the season. In the first round, the 1st seed would play against the 3rd seed, and the 2nd seed would play against the 4th seed. Following the tournament, if there was a tie between two teams leading the standings, a one game tiebreaker would be played to determine the league champion.

== Roster ==
1948–49 Drexel Dragons men's basketball team
Players
Coaches

Pos.	#	Name	Height	Weight	Year	Previous school	Hometown
F	6	Stan Laskus	—	—		John Bartram HS
F	11	John Savchak	—	—		John Bartram HS
F		Bill Banks	—	—
C		Basil Barno	6 ft 3 in (1.91 m)	—
C		Donald Breder	—	—
F		Bob Brewton	—	—		Central HS (PA)
C		Adam Jablonski	6 ft 4 in (1.93 m)	—	Fr	Saint Joseph's Prep
F		Sid Kane	—	—		Northeast HS (PA)
G		Alfred MacCart	—	—	Fr	John Bartram HS
G		Jules Schwab	—	—	Jr
G		Joe Skurla	—	—		Allentown HS
C		Roy Wagner	—	—
		Vincent Filliben	—	—
		Morton Shafter	—	—

Head coach

- Ralph Chase (Pittsburgh)

Assistant coach(es)

Bud Bossick (Muhlenberg)

Legend

- (C) Team captain
- (S) Suspended
- (I) Ineligible
- (W) Walk-on
- Injured
- Current redshirt

== Schedule ==
Date time, TV	Rank^{#}	Opponent^{#}	Result	Record	High points	High rebounds	High assists	Site (attendance) city, state
Regular season
January 5, 1949*		Philadelphia Pharmacy	W 85–45	1–0	17 – Tied	–	–	Curtis Hall Gym; Philadelphia, PA
January 7, 1949*		at Stevens Tech	W 42–39	2–0	12 – Schwab	–	–	
January 12, 1949*		at Lehigh	L 48–58	2–1	18 – MacCart	–	–	Bethlehem, PA
January 15, 1949*		Franklin & Marshall	W 75–50	3–1	16 – MacCart	–	–	Curtis Hall Gym; Philadelphia, PA
January 19, 1949		Haverford	W 55–39	4–1 (1–0)	12 – Tied	–	–	Curtis Hall Gym; Philadelphia, PA
January 22, 1949		Pennsylvania Military College	L 56–67	4–2 (1–1)	18 – Savchak	–	–	Curtis Hall Gym; Philadelphia, PA
February 2, 1949*		at Philadelphia Textile	W 76–58	5–2	23 – Schwab	–	–	Saint Joseph's Prep; Philadelphia, PA
February 6, 1949		at Swarthmore	W 51–43	6–2 (2–1)	21 – Jablonski	–	–	Lamb-Miller Field House; Swarthmore, PA
February 9, 1949		Delaware	W 68–56	7–2 (3–1)	18 – MacCart	–	–	Curtis Hall Gym; Philadelphia, PA
February 12, 1949		at Ursinus	W 75–61	8–2 (4–1)	23 – MacCart	–	–	Collegeville, PA
February 14, 1949*		Moravian	W 81–63	9–2	18 – Jablonski	–	–	Curtis Hall Gym; Philadelphia, PA
February 19, 1949		at Haverford	W 61–54	10–2 (5–1)	18 – Jablonski	–	–	Ryan Gym; Haverford, PA
February 23, 1949		Swarthmore	L 57–59	10–3 (5–2)	14 – Tied	–	–	Curtis Hall Gym; Philadelphia, PA
February 26, 1949		at Delaware	W 58–53	11–3 (6–2)	–	–	–	Newark, DE
March 2, 1949		at Pennsylvania Military College	L 53–63	11–4 (6–3)	18 – Jablonski	–	–	
March 5, 1949		Ursinus	W 69–66	12–4 (7–3)	18 – Schwab	–	–	Curtis Hall Gym; Philadelphia, PA
*Non-conference game. ^{#}Rankings from AP. (#) Tournament seedings in parentheses. All times are in Eastern Time.
