= Maureen Gray =

Maureen S. Gray (May 10, 1948 – January 7, 2014) was an American singer-songwriter, self taught guitarist, keyboardist, and producer. Gray, a child prodigy, at age five made her first public appearance in Carnegie Hall in Midtown Manhattan in New York City, singing "Steam Heat" from the musical The Pajama Game, and received a positive critical acclaim. She performed at Mount Zion Baptist Church in Glassboro, New Jersey in a concert along with her mother not long after.

At 12 years old, Gray was discovered by record producer and singer-songwriter John Medera. Regionally she released singles written by the team of John Madara and David White. Among them were recorded with Chancellor Records "Today’s The Day", "Crazy Over You", "I Don’t Want To Cry" and the Billboard Hot 100 chart hit "Dancing The Strand". She recorded a few singles for Mercury Records, among them "Goodbye Baby".

Uninterested in the politics of the music business, even as a child, she decided not to renew her contract by the time she was 14. She continued writing songs on her own, and began playing guitar and piano.

She left Philadelphia to explore other options, and ended up spending most of her life in Europe.

She resided for many years in London, England, where she recorded and performed with David Bowie, George Harrison, John Lennon, Steve Winwood, Dave Mason, David Crosby, and Stephen Sills.

Gray died in Philadelphia, Pennsylvania on January 7, 2014, from a rare form of bile duct cancer at age 65.
