= Woodstock: Music from the Original Soundtrack and More =

Live album by various artists
- Released: May 11, 1970
- Recorded: August 15–18, 1969
- Venues: Woodstock Festival, Bethel, New York
- Genres: Rock, folk
- Length: 138:56
- Label: Cotillion
- Producer: Eric Blackstead

Woodstock albums chronology
Woodstock: Music from the Original Soundtrack and More (1970)	Woodstock Two (1971)

Professional ratings
Review scores
Source	Rating
AllMusic	3/5 stars
Christgau's Record Guide	B

Woodstock: Music from the Original Soundtrack and More is a live album of selected performances from the 1969 Woodstock counterculture festival officially known as "The Woodstock Music & Art Fair". The album was compiled and produced by Eric Blackstead. Originally released on Atlantic Records' Cotillion label as a triple album on May 11, 1970, it was re-released as a four-CD box (along with Woodstock Two) by Mobile Fidelity Sound Labs in 1986 followed by a two-CD set released by Atlantic in 1987. Atlantic re-issued the two-CD set in 1994 correcting a few mastering errors found on their 1987 release. Veteran producer Eddie Kramer along with Lee Osbourne were the sound engineers during the three-day event.

Although largely authentic, a number of tracks feature truncated performances or overdubs recorded after the festival, and two tracks not recorded at the festival at all. Some of the audio material on the album was recorded by the sound crew of the Wadleigh-Maurice film crew. The 2025 book, Buzz Me in: Inside the Record Plant Studios, reports that there were many problems with the recordings such as "a high-frequency squeal on some performances," Sly Stone's "'I Want to Take You Higher' was marred by a high-pitched signal," "Santana's 'Soul Sacrifice' was...marred by a sixty-cycle buzz," and so forth.

The album was packaged in a triple-gatefold sleeve featuring a three-panel photo of the crowd taken from the stage by photographer Jim Marshall.

A second collection of recordings from the festival, Woodstock Two, was released a year later. In 1994, the songs from both albums, as well as numerous additional, previously unreleased performances from the festival (but not the stage announcements and crowd noises) were reissued by Atlantic as a four-CD box set titled Woodstock: Three Days of Peace and Music. In 2009, Rhino Records issued a six-CD box set, Woodstock: 40 Years On: Back to Yasgur's Farm, which includes further musical performances as well as stage announcements and other ancillary material. Rhino Records also reissued a remastered version of the original double CD album in 2009. Target issued a version exclusive to their stores that included a bonus disc of 14 tracks, including one previously unreleased track, "Misty Roses" by Tim Hardin.

It was certified Gold on May 22, 1970, and 2× Platinum in 1993.

In 2014, Woodstock: Music from the Original Soundtrack and More was inducted into the Grammy Hall of Fame.

== Cover ==
The couple on the album cover were photographed by Burk Uzzle for the Magnum agency. In 1989, Life magazine identified them as a then 20-year-old couple named Bobbi Kelly and Nick Ercoline, who married two years later and raised a family in Pine Bush, New York, just 40 miles (64 km) from the festival site. That claim has been disputed by a Vancouver Island woman named Jessie Kerr, who claims that she and her friend John were the subjects of the photograph, and has a photograph of herself from about the same time in which her dark hair and tinted eyeglasses appear to match those of the woman in Uzzle's photograph. At the time of Kelly's death in March 2023, it was reported that she and Ercoline were the couple featured on the album cover photograph and that the picture was taken when they stood up and embraced during Jefferson Airplane's performance. In contrast to her future husband, Kelly's face is partially seen in the photograph. In an interview with Longreads in 2019, Uzzle said that he opted to photograph the couple because "It was just so beautiful, the way they were holding themselves up and wrapped in a blanket."

== Track listing ==
On the LP release, side one was backed with side six, side two was backed with side five, and side three was backed with side four. This was common on multi-LP sets of the time, to accommodate the popular record changer turntables.

Most of the tracks have some form of stage announcement, conversation by the musicians, etc., lengthening the tracks to an extent. Times are listed as the length of time the music was played in the song, while times in parentheses indicate the total running time of the entire track.

Side one

1. John Sebastian – "I Had a Dream" (Sebastian) – 2:38 (2:53)
2. Canned Heat – "Going Up the Country" (Alan Wilson) – 3:19 (5:53)

- Stage announcements

3. Richie Havens – "Freedom (Motherless Child)" (traditional, arranged by Havens) – 5:13 (5:26)
4. Country Joe and the Fish – "Rock and Soul Music" (Country Joe McDonald, Barry "The Fish" Melton, David Cohen, Bruce Barthol, Gary "Chicken" Hirsh) – 2:09 (2:09)
5. Arlo Guthrie – "Coming into Los Angeles" (Guthrie) – 2:05 (2:50) (Note: Recorded at the Troubadour in Los Angeles.)
6. Sha-Na-Na – "At the Hop" (Artie Singer, David White, John Medora) – 2:13 (2:33)

Side two

1. Country Joe McDonald – "The Fish Cheer" / "I-Feel-Like-I'm-Fixin'-to-Die Rag" (McDonald) – 3:02 (3:48)
2. Joan Baez featuring Jeffrey Shurtleff – "Drug Store Truck Drivin' Man" (Roger McGuinn, Gram Parsons) – 2:08 (2:38)
3. Joan Baez – "Joe Hill" (Alfred Hayes, Earl Robinson) – 2:40 (5:34)

- Stage announcements

4. Crosby, Stills & Nash – "Suite: Judy Blue Eyes" (Stephen Stills) – 8:04 (9:02)
5. Crosby, Stills, Nash & Young – "Sea of Madness" (Neil Young) – 3:22 (4:20) (Note: Recorded in September 1969 at the Fillmore East in New York City.)

Side three

1. Crosby, Stills, Nash & Young – "Wooden Ships" (Stills, David Crosby, Paul Kantner) – 5:26 (5:26)
2. The Who – "We're Not Gonna Take It" (Pete Townshend) – 4:39 (6:54) (Note: The performance on the album picks up mid-song at the very end of the "We're Not Gonna Take It" portion and then finishes with the "See Me, Feel Me" and "Listening to You" sections. The final 1:50 of the track is an emergency announcement and the statement that declared "It's a free concert from now on".)

- Stage announcements

3. Joe Cocker – "With a Little Help from My Friends" (John Lennon, Paul McCartney) – 7:50 (10:06) (Note: This performance features additional background vocals added by Cocker's band during the album's post-production. In the CD version, the first disc would close with this track, with a 1:30 long recording of the rainstorm.)

Side four

- Crowd rain chant

1. Santana – "Soul Sacrifice" (Carlos Santana, Greg Rolie, David Brown, Marcus Malone) – 8:05 (13:52) (Note: The first three minutes of the track is the "Crowd Rain Chant", a chant started by the crowd as an attempt to stop the rainstorm.)

- Stage announcements

2. Ten Years After – "I'm Going Home" (Alvin Lee) – 9:20 (9:57)

Side five

1. Jefferson Airplane – "Volunteers" (Marty Balin, Kantner) – 2:45 (3:31) (Note: The final 34 seconds or so of the track is a speech by Max Yasgur, praising the crowd for coming to the festival.)

- Max Yasgur

2. Sly and the Family Stone – Medley: "Dance to the Music" / "Music Lover" / "I Want to Take You Higher" (Sly Stone) – 13:47 (15:29)
3. John Sebastian – "Rainbows All Over Your Blues" (Sebastian) – 2:05 (3:54)

Side six

1. Butterfield Blues Band – "Love March" (Gene Dinwiddie, Phillip Wilson) – 8:43 (8:59)
2. Jimi Hendrix – "The Star-Spangled Banner" / "Purple Haze" / "Instrumental Solo" (Hendrix, except "The Star-Spangled Banner" written by Francis Scott Key and John Stafford Smith and arranged by Hendrix) – 12:51 (13:42) (Note: "Instrumental Solo" was retitled and re-edited when Hendrix's Woodstock show was released more fully in the 1990s. The improvised, fast solo section immediately following "Purple Haze" was heavily cut in the original Woodstock film and soundtrack, and most of the track here is what would later be titled "Villanova Junction", a slow bluesy ballad with the band joining in the background. The uncut version of the solo was restored in the director's cut of the Woodstock film and on the Hendrix album Live at Woodstock and titled "Woodstock Improvisation".)

== Charts ==
Chart (1970)	Peak position	Certification
Australia (Kent Music Report)	2	
Billboard Top LPs	1	US: 2× Platinum
Canada Album Charts	1	
Dutch Album Charts	2	
Norwegian Album Charts	8	
UK Album Charts	35	
German Album Charts	10	
