= The Spokesmen =

American musical group

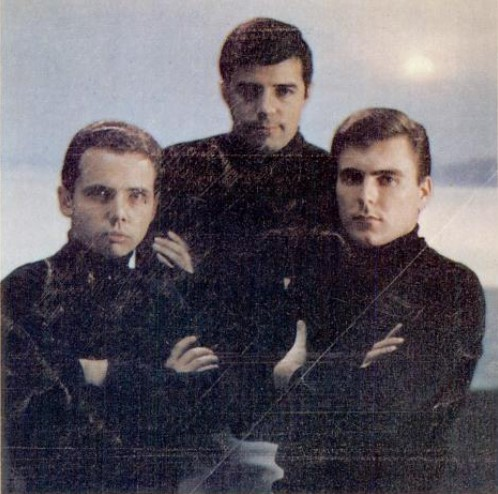
The Spokesman in 1965: left to right: David White, John Madara, Ray Gilmore

The Spokesmen were an American pop music trio. They scored a hit single in the U.S. in 1965 with the tune "The Dawn of Correction", which was a partially sarcastic counterpoint and answer record to Barry McGuire's protest song "Eve of Destruction". The song was written by the group's members, John Medora, David White, and Ray Gilmore, the latter a long time radio personality at WIBG (Wibbage) 990AM in Philadelphia, Pennsylvania. The tune hit #36 on the Billboard Hot 100 chart. They also released a remake of the Beatles' "Michelle" as a single on Decca Records that got significant airplay on WIBG.

Co-composers White and Medora had previously co-written several hit singles, including "At the Hop" for Danny and the Juniors (of which White was a founding member), "You Don't Own Me" for Lesley Gore; and "1-2-3" for Len Barry. White died on March 16, 2019, at the age of 79.

== Members ==
- John Madara (real name: John Medora)
- David White (real name: David White Tricker), formerly of Danny & the Juniors
- Ray Gilmore

== Discography ==
=== Album ===
- 1965: The Dawn of Correction:
  - “'It Ain’t Fair” / “Colours” / “Have Courage, Be Careful” / “Love Minus Zero/No Limit” / “Like a Babe” / “You've Got to Hide Your Love Away” / “The Dawn of Correction” / “Down in the Boondocks” / “Better Days Are Yet to Come” / “There but for Fortune” / “For You Babe” / “It Ain't Me Babe'”

=== Singles ===
- August 1965: “The Dawn of Correction” / “For You Babe”
- November 1965: “It Ain’t Fair” / “Have Courage, Be Careful”
- December 1965: “Michelle” / “Better Days Are Yet to Come”
- May 1966: “Today's the Day” / “Enchante”
- November 1966: “I Love How You Love Me” / “Beautiful Girl”
- 1967: “Flashback” / “Mary Jane”
