= The Best of Woodstock =

Compilation album of the 1969 Woodstock Festival

Live album by Various artists
- Released: June 21, 1994
- Recorded: August 15, 16, & 17, 1969 at Woodstock Festival, Bethel, NY
- Genre: Rock
- Length: 74:49
- Label: Atlantic Records

Woodstock albums chronology
Woodstock 2 (1971)	The Best of Woodstock (1994)	Woodstock: Three Days of Peace and Music (1994)

The Best of Woodstock is a 1-CD live compilation album of the 1969 Woodstock Festival in Bethel, New York. Its release marked the 25th anniversary of the festival. It contains tracks which were already released on the original Woodstock: Music from the Original Soundtrack and More album. Shortly after the album's release, Atlantic Records released a much longer 4-CD box set entitled Woodstock: Three Days of Peace and Music, which contained tracks from the original album, Woodstock 2, and numerous additional, previously unreleased performances from the festival, but not the stage announcements and crowd noises.

== Track listing ==
1. John B. Sebastian – "I Had a Dream": 2:41
2. Canned Heat – "Going Up the Country": 3:20
3. Richie Havens – "Freedom": 5:26
4. Country Joe McDonald – "The Fish Cheer / I-Feel-Like-I'm-Fixin'-to-Die Rag": 3:08
5. Joan Baez – "Joe Hill": 3:13
6. Crosby, Stills, Nash & Young – "Wooden Ships": 5:56
7. The Who – "We're Not Gonna Take It": 5:05
8. Joe Cocker – "With a Little Help from My Friends": 8:39
9. Santana – "Soul Sacrifice": 11:09
10. Jefferson Airplane – "Volunteers": 2:58
11. Ten Years After – "I'm Going Home": 9:30
12. Jimi Hendrix – "The Star-Spangled Banner" / "Purple Haze" / "Instrumental Solo": 13:39
