= List of Cash Box Top 100 number-one singles of 1958 =

These are the songs that reached number one in the USA on the Top 60 Best Sellers chart (expanded to 75 on June 21, 1958, and 100 on September 13, 1958) in 1958 as published by Cash Box magazine.

Key
†	Indicates best-performing single of 1958

Issue date	Song	Artist
January 4	At the Hop	Danny & the Juniors
January 11	At the Hop	Danny & the Juniors
January 18	At the Hop	Danny & the Juniors
January 25	At the Hop	Danny & the Juniors
February 1	At the Hop	Danny & the Juniors
February 8	The Stroll	The Diamonds
February 15	The Stroll	The Diamonds
February 22	Get a Job	The Silhouettes
March 1	Don't	Elvis Presley
March 8	Get a Job	The Silhouettes
March 15	Tequila	The Champs
March 22	Tequila	The Champs
March 29	Tequila	The Champs
April 5	Tequila	The Champs
April 12	Tequila	The Champs
April 19	He's Got The Whole World (In His Hands)	Laurie London
April 26	He's Got The Whole World (In His Hands)	Laurie London
May 3	Twilight Time	The Platters
May 10	Witch Doctor	David Seville
May 17	All I Have to Do Is Dream	The Everly Brothers
May 24	All I Have to Do Is Dream	The Everly Brothers
May 31	All I Have to Do Is Dream	The Everly Brothers
June 7	All I Have to Do Is Dream	The Everly Brothers
June 14	The Purple People Eater	Sheb Wooley
June 21	The Purple People Eater	Sheb Wooley
June 28	The Purple People Eater	Sheb Wooley
July 5	The Purple People Eater	Sheb Wooley
July 12	The Purple People Eater	Sheb Wooley
July 19	Yakety Yak	The Coasters
July 26	Patricia	Perez Prado & Orchestra
August 2	Patricia	Perez Prado & Orchestra
August 9	Patricia	Perez Prado & Orchestra
August 16	Patricia	Perez Prado & Orchestra
August 23	Nel Blu Dipinto Di Blu (Volare) †	Domenico Modugno, Dean Martin
August 30	Nel Blu Dipinto Di Blu (Volare) †	Domenico Modugno, Dean Martin
September 6	Nel Blu Dipinto Di Blu (Volare) †	Domenico Modugno, Dean Martin
September 13	Nel Blu Dipinto Di Blu (Volare) †	Domenico Modugno, Dean Martin
September 20	Nel Blu Dipinto Di Blu (Volare) †	Domenico Modugno, Dean Martin
September 27	Nel Blu Dipinto Di Blu (Volare) †	Domenico Modugno, Dean Martin
October 4	It's All in the Game	Tommy Edwards
October 11	It's All in the Game	Tommy Edwards
October 18	It's All in the Game	Tommy Edwards
October 25	It's All in the Game	Tommy Edwards
November 1	It's All in the Game	Tommy Edwards
November 8	Topsy Part 2	Cozy Cole
November 15	It's Only Make Believe	Conway Twitty
November 22	Tom Dooley	The Kingston Trio
November 29	Tom Dooley	The Kingston Trio
December 6	Tom Dooley	The Kingston Trio
December 13	To Know Him Is to Love Him	The Teddy Bears
December 20	The Chipmunk Song	Chipmunks with David Seville
December 27	The Chipmunk Song	Chipmunks with David Seville

== See also ==
- 1958 in music
- List of Hot 100 number-one singles of 1958 (U.S.)
