= Tyrone Garland =

American basketball player (born 1992)

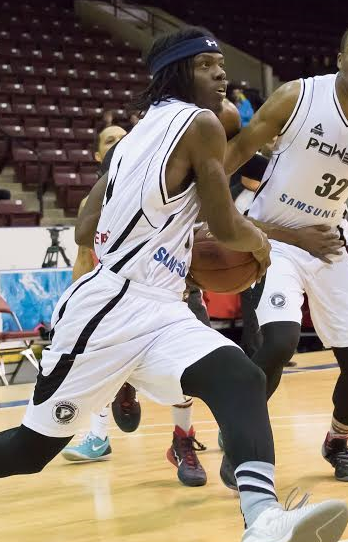
- Garland in 2015

Personal information
- Born: August 13, 1992 (age 34) Philadelphia, Pennsylvania, U.S.
- Listed height: 6 ft 1 in (1.85 m)
- Listed weight: 185 lb (84 kg)

Career information
- High school: John Bartram (Philadelphia, Pennsylvania)
- College: Virginia Tech (2010–2012); La Salle (2012–2014)
- NBA draft: 2014: undrafted
- Playing career: 2015–2020
- Position: Point guard

Career history
- 2015: Mississauga Power
- 2016–2017: Breiðablik
- 2019: Feronikeli
- 2020: Cupes de los Pepines

Tyrone W. Garland (born August 13, 1992), nicknamed South West Philly Floater, is an American former basketball player. A native of Philadelphia, Pennsylvania, he joined the Mississauga Power midway in the 2014–15 season, a few months after completing his senior year at La Salle University. He had several impactful performances with Mississauga in his rookie season and was awarded several starts. Garland primarily plays the point guard position, but is known as an all-around guard.

Garland, whom Rivals.com and 247Sports.com rated a three-star recruit coming out of high school, started out his collegiate career with Virginia Tech after being recruited by a number of high major college basketball programs. However, after seeing very limited minutes from head coach Seth Greenberg during his first two seasons there, he transferred to La Salle and started competing for the Explorers in late 2012. As a junior with his new team, he famously made a game-winning shot dubbed the "Southwest Philly Floater" in the 2013 NCAA tournament.

Before playing college basketball, Garland starred for John Bartram High School in his hometown and was a first-team All-State selection and one of the top scorers in the history of the Philadelphia Public League (PPL). In his time, he scored the third-most points by any player in the Public League, only being exceeded by Maureece Rice and Wilt Chamberlain. Garland is currently the fourth-best scorer in PPL history.

== Early life and high school ==
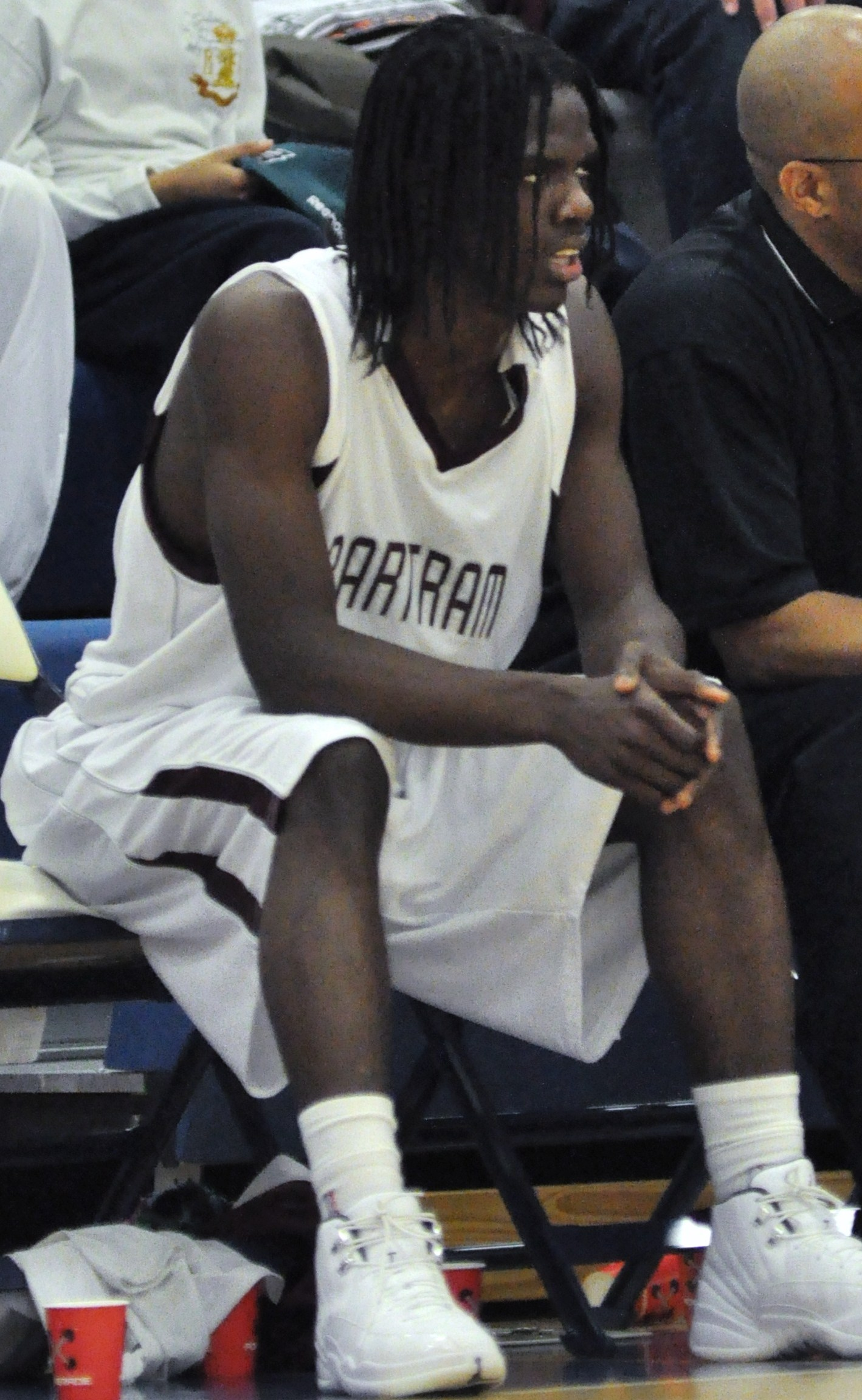
Garland with John Bartram in 2010

Garland was raised in Philadelphia, Pennsylvania, by his mother, Audrey Tyler. He grew up on South Yewdall Street, near 54th Street and Greenway Avenue in Southwest Philadelphia's Kingsessing neighborhood. He attended middle school at Richard Allen Preparatory Charter School in the same area. His cousin Bernard Tyler, a former player at Overbrook High School in Philadelphia, helped him learn a basketball move known as the floater. Tyler told Garland to "just get it over the big man and leave it in God's hands".

Initially, Garland was enrolled at Delaware Valley Charter School, which was located only half a mile from his future college, La Salle University. However, his cousin Donnel Feaster, an alumnus of John Bartram High School, recommended that Garland attend his alma mater. The team's head coach, James Brown, said, "I'm always telling my ex-players, 'If you see any good ones, send them my way'...Not that they listen. Don did, though. That's how I got Ty".

Garland ultimately enrolled at Bartram and played under Brown. A four-year letter winner, he was promoted to team captain in his senior season and garnered several Philadelphia Public League (PPL) accolades. In both his junior and senior years, the Philadelphia Daily News named Garland first-team All-City and the Associated Press named him a first-team All-State selection. He led Bartram in his last two seasons there, averaging 28.5 points and 25.1 points per game as a junior and senior respectively. The team went 73–35 in the years that Garland was with them, and he led them to a PPL championship appearance against Imhotep Institute Charter High School, where Bartram lost 48–56. He scored 32 points and 6 three-pointers, but his teammates were only 5-for-37 in their shot attempts.

In an earlier 2009 Class AAAA playoff contest vs Pocono Mountain East High School, Garland scored eight consecutive points in the final 44 seconds of regulation. He capped the streak by making a 30-foot shot with 3.3 seconds remaining, and his 40 total points helped Bartram win, 72–67. Garland scored a total of 2,198 points, making him the top scorer in school history and the third-leading scorer in Public League history. Maureece Rice, who scored 2,681, and Wilt Chamberlain, who scored 2,206, were the only players who had accumulated more points in their high school careers in the league. Maurice Watson, from the Boys' Latin of Philadelphia Charter School, broke both Chamberlain's and Garland's records in 2012, pushing Garland to fourth on the list.

=== AAU ===
While in high school, Garland also played Amateur Athletic Union (AAU) basketball with the Philly Pride. Amauro Austin, a statistician for the Philadelphia Daily News, directed the program while Garland was there. Austin commented, "Everybody liked Ty. Not one person didn't. He was loyal, honest; just a solid-gold individual. He didn't have a malicious bone in his body". Garland often slept during the day and stayed awake at night, leading his peers to think of him as a vampire. Before becoming a senior, he led the Pride to sixth place at the under-17 national AAU tournament in Orlando, Florida. The team finished with an 8–1 record due largely to Garland's contributions.

College recruiting
Name	Hometown	School	Height	Weight	Commit date
Tyrone Garland; PG	Philadelphia, PA	John Bartram (PA)	6 ft 1 in (1.85 m)	167.5 lb (76.0 kg)	Jul 9, 2009
Tyrone Garland; PG	Recruit ratings: Scout: Rivals: 247Sports: ESPN:				
Overall recruit ranking: ESPN: 91, 31 (PG)
Note: In many cases, Scout, Rivals, 247Sports, On3, and ESPN may conflict in their listings of height and weight.; In these cases, the average was taken. ESPN grades are on a 100-point scale.; Sources: "Virginia Tech 2010 Basketball Commitments". Rivals.; "ESPN". ESPN.; "2010 Team Ranking". Rivals.

== Collegiate career ==
=== Freshman ===
On July 9, 2009, Garland committed to play college basketball for the Hokies of Virginia Tech. He announced his decision to attend the school at a press conference at the Reebok All-American Camp. Garland had also considered joining the programs at La Salle, Nebraska, Temple, St. Bonaventure, Maryland, Seton Hall, Providence, and Butler. La Salle University is based in Garland's hometown of Philadelphia and its head coach, John Giannini, recruited him especially hard out of high school. His old coach at John Bartram High School, James Brown, supported his commitment to Virginia Tech. Assistant coach James Johnson was the man primarily responsible for recruiting Garland. Rivals.com rated the point guard a three-star recruit, and ESPN ranked him as the 31st-best player of his position in the Class of 2010. Garland officially signed a National Letter of Intent with the team on February 3, 2010, and enrolled at Virginia Tech on June 30. Garland would play his freshman season for a Virginia Tech Hokies team that had a large part of its scoring coming from Malcolm Delaney, Jeff Allen, and Dorenzo Hudson in the 2009–10 season. Delaney, their leading scorer, chose to withdraw from the 2010 NBA draft in May 2010 and returned for another season with the Hokies. Garland weighed approximately 170 lbs (77 kg) entering college, and because of his shooting guard qualities, he was not as highly rated as some of the team's other 2010 recruits, like Jarell Eddie.

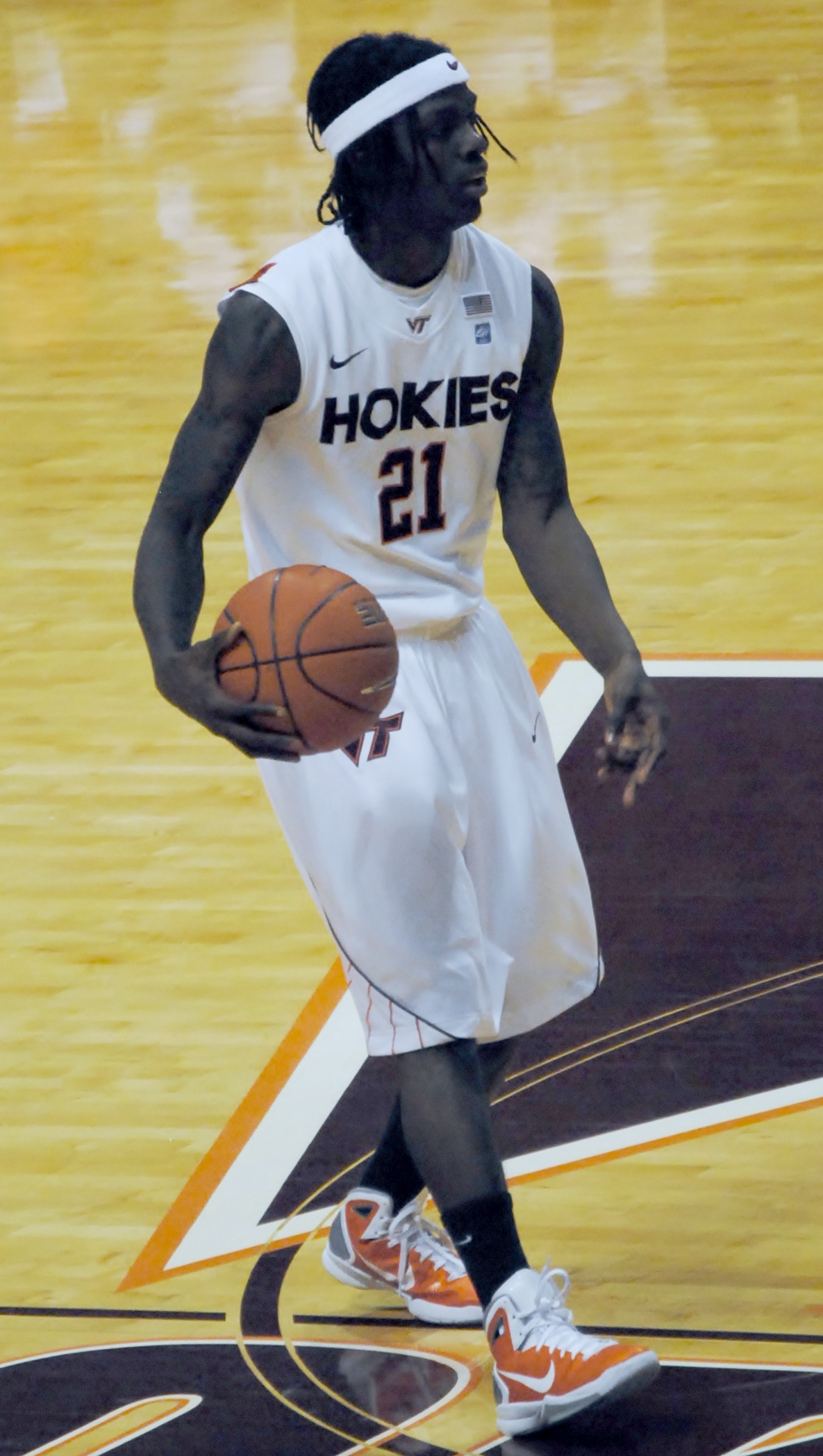
Garland with the Hokies in January 2011

On November 12, 2010, Garland made his career debut with Virginia Tech against the Campbell Fighting Camels, seeing one minute of playing time on the court and going 0-of-1 from the field. However, the Hokies easily won the game, 70–60. Garland scored his first points as a Hokie on November 26, vs Oklahoma State, putting up 6 in spite of very limited playing time. He was allowed to play more than 20 minutes for the first time in his collegiate career against Mount St. Mary's. The opposing team was easily defeated, 99–34. Seven of the ten Hokies that appeared throughout the contest played more than 20 minutes, and Garland–who recorded 16 points–was one of five to score double digits. It would be his season-high performance and also the only time he scored more than 10 points as a freshman. On March 16, 2011, Garland played a career-high 23 minutes vs Bethune-Cookman in the first round of the 2011 National Invitational Tournament (NIT), recording seven points and having perfect free throw shooting. In 6.8 minutes per game in his first season, he averaged 2.8 points, 0.3 rebounds, and 0.5 assists.

=== Sophomore ===
Entering the 2011–12 season, the Hokies lost star Malcolm Delaney, who signed a conditional one-year contract with the French professional basketball team Élan Chalon following his senior year. Garland debuted as a sophomore on November 12, 2011, against East Tennessee State, making his first-ever start at the collegiate level due to the absence of Erick Green. He played 24 minutes throughout the game, recording 13 points, 3 assists, and 2 steals. In Tech's next contest with Monmouth, Garland scored a career-high 18 points off the bench, shooting 7-for-7 from the field.

However, as the season progressed, head coach Seth Greenberg began giving Garland fewer minutes. Following the recovery of freshman Marquis Rankin from a torn meniscus, Garland played a total of one minute in three games. He also scored a combined six points following his initial two performances that season. On December 11, 2011, Garland did not even remove his warm-up shirt in his team's game vs Norfolk State. When Greenberg was asked about Garland's playing time, the coach said, "Marquis [Rankin] is right now a good play-starter and good on ball defender. We've got to get other guys more minutes". When asked a similar question the day before, he said that "you can't play 13 guys". On December 16, 2011, Garland announced on Twitter that he was planning to transfer out of Virginia Tech. Following his exams, he returned to his hometown of Philadelphia. Garland became the third men's basketball player to transfer out of the Hokies' team in the past academic year, following the footsteps of Ben Boggs, who moved to Valparaiso, and Manny Atkins, who would end up with Georgia State. Garland finished his sophomore year at Virginia Tech averaging 4.6 points, 1.3 assists, and 1.3 turnovers in eight appearances. In late December 2011, he began competing for La Salle. Explorers head coach John Giannini said, "We recruited Tyrone extremely hard out of high school. He is known as a scorer and can also be a very good passer and defender. He is the type of all-around guard, talent and person that will make our team better. He gives us an experienced player to continue our growth over the next 2 years. With his addition we will have tremendous team quickness and depth." Several of the team's top scorers in 2011–12 had experience playing high school basketball in the Philadelphia Public and Catholic Leagues.

It was good being back home in front of the friends and family.

— Garland on his transfer to La Salle and return to Philadelphia.

=== Junior ===
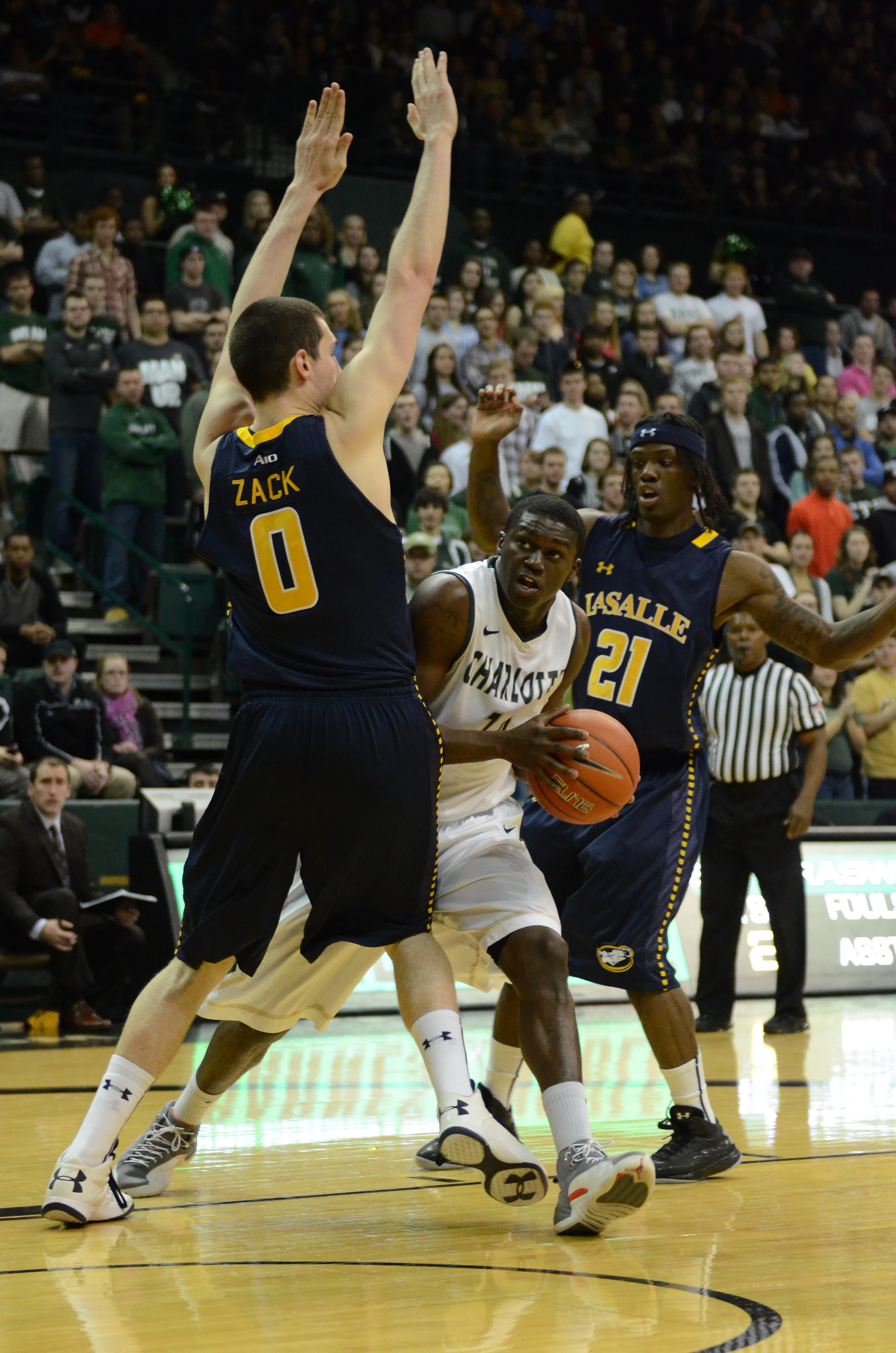
Garland (right) defends Charlotte's Terrence Williams in 2013

Following his transfer, Garland opened his stint with La Salle on December 15, 2012, in a road game against Bucknell, scoring 9 points in 22 minutes off the bench and recording 2 turnovers and 4 personal fouls. He did not take part in the team's earlier games because he was ineligible due to NCAA regulations regarding player transfers. In the game that followed, he posted a career-best 26 points as a bench player in a win over Iona. He also added 3 rebounds, an assist, and a steal in the 23 minutes he was on the court. In a seven-minute stretch in the second half, Garland scored 14 straight points. He said after the game, "I used to do it in high school. It kind of felt like high school when I was out there; it just felt good". Garland, who led the Explorers in scoring, also received praise from head coach John Giannini. On December 22, 2012, he had another impactful performance vs Sacred Heart, with six assists in 31 minutes of play. This was also his first-ever start under Giannini. The coach commented about Garland, "He's a very underrated passer. People think because he scored all those points in high school he's a scorer first and foremost. I think he's a very good passer". However, this would be his sole start in his junior year at La Salle. Garland was effective in the opening, First Four round of the 2013 NCAA Men's Division I Basketball Tournament against Boise State, finishing with a team-high 22 points and, in turn, scoring 20 or more points for the second time as a junior. After the game, Giannini told Garland, "This is why I chased you all over the place, to win NCAA tournament games and see if you could be a great player". On March 24, 2013, against the Ole Miss Rebels, Garland made a scooping layup off the backboard with 2.5 seconds left in regulation to send La Salle into the Sweet 16 round of the 2013 NCAA Men's Division I Basketball Tournament. The game-winner was known as the "Southwest Philly Floater," following Garland's post-game comments, in which he said, "That's the Southwest Philly Floater, man. Shoutout to my Cousin Bern, shoutout to my Mom". He made the shot in spite of defensive efforts from the Rebels' 6 ft 9 in (2.06 m) center Reginald Buckner, who had blocked the Explorer multiple times in the game. Garland recalled the play, saying, "Time was running out, and I felt like I could get the drive. When I cut, I just saw an opening and took the ball up...I went in there and knew if I could get an open shot, I could make it". Following a defeat to Wichita State that ended the team's tournament run and their season, Garland was averaging 13.1 points, 2.1 rebounds, and 2 assists.

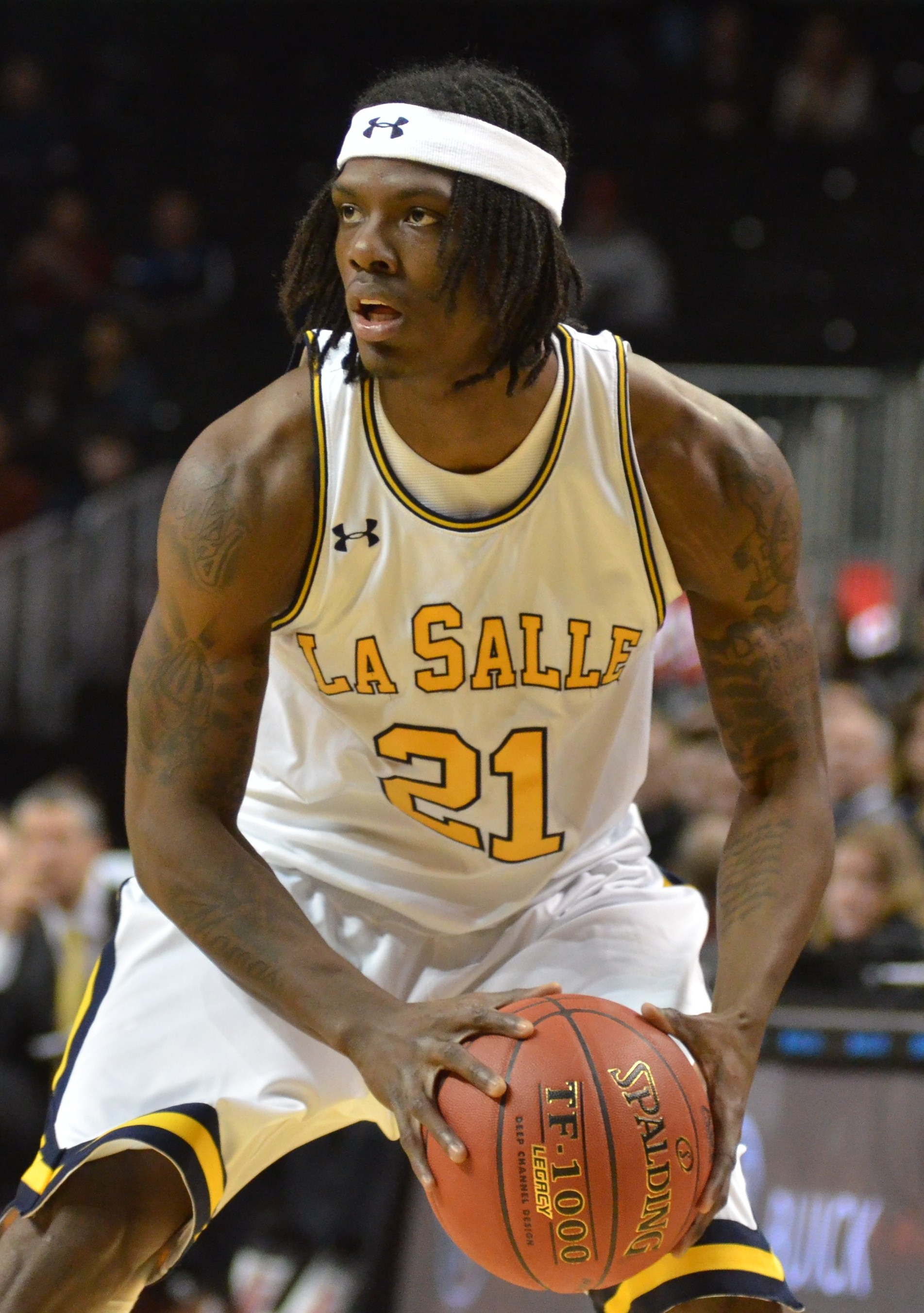
Garland at La Salle in 2013

=== Senior ===
Garland entered the season as one of four seniors on La Salle's men's basketball roster. Ramon Galloway, who led the team in scoring in 2012–13, graduated the previous year. Garland debuted as a senior in an exhibition game vs Indiana University of Pennsylvania on November 2, 2013, scoring 16 points on .500 shooting. He made his first official appearance in a double-overtime home contest against Manhattan. Garland led a 13–3 run, highlighted by two key shots, that forced overtime. He made a three-pointer with minutes left in the game, but his team ran out of time before they could rally. Nevertheless, Garland scored a career-high 28 points, hitting 12 free throws. He had an effective second game as well. Against Quinnipiac at the ESPN Tip-Off Marathon, despite scoring far fewer points, his last-minute rebound was instrumental to the Explorers' victory. Head coach John Giannini said, "He had zero rebounds in 44 minutes against Manhattan. The rebound that really iced the game today was a defensive rebound by Tyrone. Sometimes you don't play well, you don't do something, and then you learn from it and do better, so I am pleased with him". The guard had another notable performance on November 22, 2013, against Morgan State, when he led both teams with 25 points. He also added four three-pointers. On January 25, 2014, Garland notched a career-best 30 points vs VCU. His team's 10-point 2014 Atlantic 10 tournament loss to St. Bonaventure, in which he contributed 0 points in 30 minutes, marked the end of his collegiate career. He finished the season averaging 12.6 points, 2.3 rebounds, 2.6 assists, and 0.7 steals. Garland, Sam Mills, Tyreek Duren, and Taylor Dunn, recorded the most wins for a single senior class at La Salle in 22 years.

=== Statistics ===
Cited from RealGM.

Year	Team	GP	GS	MPG	FG%	3P%	FT%	RPG	APG	SPG	BPG	PPG
2010–11	Virginia Tech	29	0	6.8	.384	.312	.737	0.3	0.5	0.2	0.0	2.8
2011–12	Virginia Tech	8	1	10.8	.500	.222	.750	0.5	1.3	0.4	0.0	4.6
2012–13	La Salle	27	1	24.5	.424	.286	.726	2.1	2.0	1.2	0.0	13.1
2013–14	La Salle	31	24	29.5	.332	.229	.738	2.3	2.6	0.7	0.2	12.6
Career		95	26	19.6	.378	.259	.734	1.5	1.7	0.6	0.1	9.0

== Professional career ==
Following his graduation from La Salle University, Garland signed with the sports agent Gilad Berkowitz from Berkowitz Career Ventures. Berkowitz, a law student at Duke University, was certified with the National Basketball Players Association but was only two years older than his client. The agent said, "What he has to overcome is his size and range and I have to overcome my age. We are going to market ourselves to NBA teams". Garland's connections with Berkowitz helped him get to know trainer Kendrick Williams and get an endorsement deal with Under Armour. He had hopes of playing in the National Basketball Association (NBA), regardless of whether he had to compete in Europe before reaching that level. In mid-October 2014, Garland planned on entering the 2014 NBA Development League Draft. However, on November 16, he agreed to terms with Michelin Etha Engomis Nicosia of the Cyprus Basketball Division 1, but would not make an official appearance for them.

On January 14, 2015, after placing one of their players, Mike Allison, on the injury reserve list, the Mississauga Power of the National Basketball League of Canada (NBL) signed and activated Garland. On January 15, 2015, he made his professional debut for the Power against the Brampton A's, recording 18 points, 6 rebounds, and 6 assists and being named Peak Performer of the Game. The opposing team won the game with a score of 101–90. Garland had another impact performance on January 22, 2015, against the Halifax Rainmen, as he scored 26 points, grabbed 5 rebounds, and recorded 7 assists, leading Mississauga to a victory. In an overtime loss to the Windsor Express on February 17, he scored 20 or more points for the second time that season, notching 23. He made two key three-pointers in the closing minutes. On February 28, in Mississauga's regular season finale vs the London Lightning, Garland recorded a season-high 31 points. He finished his rookie season averaging 12.9 points, 4.1 assists, and 1.3 steals. He started in 12 of his 16 appearances. In late June 2015, the Mississauga Power folded after the creation of the NBA Development League affiliate for the Toronto Raptors, known as Raptors 905. The Power's rights were purchased by Maple Leaf Sports & Entertainment (MLSE) and their home court, the Hershey Centre, became the venue for Raptors 905 games. The move ended Garland's stint with Mississauga. He would not join Raptors 905, as it had no connections with the Power players and was merely a development team for the Toronto Raptors. After his stint in Canada, Garland returned to Philadelphia, playing pickup games at Myers Recreation Center and lifting weights at La Salle.

On April 25, 2016, Garland signed with Breiðablik of the Icelandic second-tier First Division. He was the only American on the team. La Salle director of basketball operations Matt Bloom recommended Garland, who had difficulty finding basketball jobs overseas, to Breiðablik coach Lárus Jónsson. Garland gave all of his teammates a nickname. He scored 43 points and recorded nine steals vs. Valur on October 14. Garland nearly had a quadruple-double on October 27, putting up 37 points, 10 rebounds, 10 assists, and nine steals to beat FSu Selfoss. He shot 8-for-8 on three-pointers in a victory against Körfuknattleiksfélag ÍA in December. For the regular season, Garland averaged 26.4 points, 5.7 assists and 3.8 steals per game. In the promotion playoffs, he averaged 31.4 points and 4.8 assists in a best-of-five series loss against Valur.

On November 22, 2019, Garland signed with KB Feronikeli of the Kosovo Basketball Superleague. He had 42 points in a game in December. He left the team later that month.

In February 2020, he joined Cupes de los Pepines of the Liga Nacional de Baloncesto in the Dominican Republic.

=== Statistics ===
Cited from RealGM.

Legend
GP	Games played	GS	Games started	MPG	Minutes per game
FG%	Field goal percentage	3P%	3-point field goal percentage	FT%	Free throw percentage
RPG	Rebounds per game	APG	Assists per game	SPG	Steals per game
BPG	Blocks per game	PPG	Points per game	**Bold**	Career high

Year	Team	GP	GS	MPG	FG%	3P%	FT%	RPG	APG	SPG	BPG	PPG
2014–15	Mississauga Power	16	12	27.7	.387	.316	.717	2.5	4.1	1.3	0.1	12.9
Career		16	12	27.7	.387	.316	.717	2.5	4.1	1.3	0.1	12.9

== Personal life ==
As a freshman at Virginia Tech, Garland was named to the 2011 All-Atlantic Coast Conference (ACC) Academic Team along with Kyle Singler, Mason Plumlee, Ryan Kelly, and Tyler Zeller. He earned a grade-point average of above 3.00 for the previous semester and maintained it as a cumulative average through his academic career. He was also one of 2,835 student-athletes recognized by the ACC on its 2010–11 Academic Honor Roll. Garland majored in university studies at Virginia Tech, but majored in sociology at La Salle University. He recalled the final months of his senior year at La Salle, saying, "I was really focused on graduating school and locking down my grades for graduation. I was focused on the next step, but I had to graduate school. That degree is very big to me. I told my mom I was going to graduate college and I just wanted to put that smile on her face".

In the summer of 2015, Garland participated in The Basketball Tournament (TBT), a five-on-five, single-elimination basketball tournament in which the winner out of the 96 teams wins a total of $1 million. He competed for a team made up of former La Salle men's basketball players, called 20th & Olney, reuniting with Ramon Galloway, Steve Zack, and Tyreek Duren. Explorers video coordinator Andrew McGlynn, who acted as the team's general manager and coach, said, "The main reason [for entering] is how close the program is here. [Coach Dr. John Giannini] has done such a good job of making it a family atmosphere around here". Garland was one of 50 players with NBL Canada experience that were playing in TBT. On July 18, 2015, at Philadelphia University, he debuted with 22 points in a win over Max's All Stars, a team led by Dominique Jones. 20th & Olney lost in the next round to Boeheim's Army, which was led by Hakim Warrick and Olu Famutimi, as Garland notched 21 points.

New York Knicks guard Mikal Bridges, who played at Villanova, is Garland's second cousin. Garland is a fan of Villanova basketball and roots for Bridges.
