= Chalypso =

The Chalypso was a popular dance from 1958 which arose from the Calypso Craze of 1957 and combined the sounds and feel of the cha-cha-cha and calypso. It was developed and popularized by dancers on American Bandstand. It is among the dances listed in "At the Hop" by Danny and the Juniors.

A favorite song for chalypso was Billy and Lillie's "La De Dah", which had been released on Bandstand host Dick Clark's Swan Records. Many artists recorded chalypso songs, including Ike Turner and Chubby Checker. The craze was supplanted by Checker's version of "The Twist".

== External references ==
- Chalypso
- Dance description as taught by Richard Powers in 2007 at Stockton Folk Dance Camp
