= Rock and Roll Is Here to Stay =

1958 single by Danny & the Juniors

Single by Danny & the Juniors
- B-side: "School Boy Romance"
- Released: January 1958
- Genre: Rock and roll, doo-wop
- Length: 2:28
- Label: ABC-Paramount 45-9888
- Songwriter: David White
- Producer: Artie Singer

"Rock and Roll Is Here to Stay" is a song written by David White and first recorded by his group, Danny & the Juniors. Released in January 1958 by ABC-Paramount Records as the follow-up to the group's #1 hit "At the Hop", it reached #19 on the Billboard Hot 100 and #16 R&B.

== Background ==
The song—with its lyrics of "Rock and roll is here to stay / It will never die"—was originally written in response to attacks on rock and roll music by some conservative radio stations, including KWK in St. Louis, that included the smashing of "undesirable" rock and roll records.

It has subsequently been recorded by many other artists, including Sha Na Na on their debut 1969 album Rock & Roll Is Here to Stay!. They also released the song as their first single that year.

They later performed the song in the 1978 film Grease as "Johnny Casino and the Gamblers" as John Travolta and Olivia Newton-John danced to the song.

Sha Na Na performed the song on their syndicated TV show in 1977 during the first season, episode 8, with Screamin' Scott Simon on lead vocals.

Sha Na Na performed the song in the 1970 concert film Festival Express, a train tour of Canada by the leading rock musicians of the era, which was released in 2003 as a documentary.

The song appeared in John Carpenter's Christine (1983), based on Stephen King's novel, and on the soundtrack album.

Showaddywaddy released a recording of the song in 2002. Kristy McNichol and Jimmy McNichol, Tiny Tim, Cliff Richard, John Earle, and Esa Pakarinen have also recorded the song.
