= The Tyrones =

American rock band

The Tyrones were an American rock and roll group, formed in Philadelphia in the 1950s. The group was run by Tyrone DeNittis and featured George Lesser. Their hit songs included "Blast Off" and "I'm Shook", and they appeared singing "Blast Off" in the film Let's Rock. Sponsored in part by Bill Haley, the Tyrones recorded a number of Haley/Comets-written songs. It is also believed that several Comets including Frank Beecher took part in the recording sessions, which were later "cleaned up" by Johnny Grande and Billy Williamson. DeNittis' brother, Al Dean, briefly joined the Comets as sax player in 1960. He may also have recorded with the Tyrones.

The band's music was used in the soundtracks of the films The Iron Giant and Pink Flamingos.

== Discography ==
- "The Campus Rock"/"(She Wants) Candy And Flowers" Wing Records single #90072 (1956)
- "My Rock 'N' Roll Baby"/"Year Round Love" Mercury Records single #70939 (1956)
- "Pink Champagne"/"Street of Memories" Mercury Records single #71104 (1957)
- "Broke Down Baby"/"Giggles" Decca Records single #30559 (1958)
- "Blast Off"/"I'm Shook" Decca Records single #30643 (1958)
- "Bring Back"/"My Love" Dahlia Records single #1001 (1959)

== Filmography ==
- Let's Rock (1958)
