= Woodstock Diary =

Live album by Various artists
- Released: August 30, 1994
- Recorded: August 15–18, 1969
- Genre: Rock
- Length: 68:05
- Label: Atlantic
- Producer: Alan Douglas

Woodstock albums chronology
Woodstock: Three Days of Peace and Music (1994)	''Woodstock Diary'' (1994)	Woodstock 94 (1994)

Woodstock Diary is a live album recorded at the Woodstock Festival in 1969. It was released in 1994, at the same time as the 4-CD box set Woodstock: Three Days of Peace and Music, but contains some tracks not available on the box set.

== Track listing ==
1. Joe Cocker – "Let's Go Get Stoned" – 5:30
2. The Band – "The Weight" – 4:30
3. Johnny Winter – "Mean Town Blues" – 4:20
4. Crosby, Stills, & Nash – "Blackbird" – 2:35
5. Janis Joplin – "Try (Just a Little Bit Harder)" – 4:15
6. Janis Joplin – "Ball and Chain" – 6:14
7. Richie Havens – "I Can't Make It Anymore" – 3:50
8. Jefferson Airplane – "Somebody to Love" – 4:00
9. Jefferson Airplane – "White Rabbit" – 2:25
10. Tim Hardin – "If I Were a Carpenter" – 2:35
11. Mountain – "Southbound Train" – 3:30
12. Sly and the Family Stone – "Love City" – 6:21
13. Joe Cocker – "I Shall Be Released" – 5:50
14. Jimi Hendrix – "Voodoo Child (Slight Return)" – 12:10
