= Woodstock Two =

Live album by various artists
- Released: March 1971
- Recorded: August 15–18, 1969
- Venues: Woodstock Festival, Bethel, New York
- Genres: Rock, folk
- Length: 86:49
- Labels: Cotillion in US, Atlantic in Europe
- Producer: Eric Blackstead

Woodstock albums chronology
Woodstock: Music from the Original Soundtrack and More (1970)	Woodstock Two (1971)	The Best of Woodstock (1994)

Professional ratings
Review scores
Source	Rating
AllMusic	4.5/5 stars
Christgau's Record Guide	B

Woodstock Two is the second live album released of the 1969 Woodstock Festival concert. The two-LP set contains more material from many acts featured on the first Woodstock album with additional performances from Mountain and Melanie. The tracks by Mountain were in fact not from their Woodstock performance but rather a show recorded at New York's Fillmore East. Unlike the first Woodstock soundtrack LP, this LP does not contain any ancillary stage announcements. Like the previous album this was also packaged in a triple gatefold sleeve.

Woodstock Two was originally released in 1971 as a double LP set The first CD release was released by Mobile Fidelity Sound Labs (as a 4 CD collection with the original Woodstock triple LP) and was re-released as a double CD by Atlantic in 1988 and re-issued in 1994. Also in 1994 the songs from both albums, as well as numerous additional, previously unreleased performances from the festival, but not the stage announcements and crowd noises, were reissued on a 4-CD box set titled Woodstock: Three Days of Peace and Music. An even more comprehensive 6-CD set, Woodstock: 40 Years On: Back to Yasgur's Farm, was issued by Rhino Records in 2009. The 2 cd version was also re-issued by Rhino in 2009.

It was certified Gold in the US on April 1, 1971. It peaked at No. 7 on the Billboard Top LPs chart during the week of May 7, 1971.

== Track listing ==
Side one

1. Jimi Hendrix – "Jam Back at the House" (Hendrix) – 7:27
2. Jimi Hendrix – "Izabella" (Hendrix) – 5:05
3. Jimi Hendrix – "Get My Heart Back Together" (Hendrix) – 8:19

Side two

1. Jefferson Airplane – "Won't You Try / Saturday Afternoon" (Paul Kantner) – 5:28
2. Jefferson Airplane – "Eskimo Blue Day" (Grace Slick, Kantner) – 6:22
3. The Butterfield Blues Band – "Everything's Gonna Be All Right" (Walter Jacobs) – 8:58

Side three

1. Joan Baez – "Sweet Sir Galahad" (Baez) – 3:58
2. Crosby, Stills, Nash & Young – "Guinnevere" (David Crosby) – 5:20
3. Crosby, Stills, Nash & Young – "4 + 20" (Stephen Stills) – 2:22
4. Crosby, Stills, Nash & Young – "Marrakesh Express" (Graham Nash) – 2:31 (This track features additional bass and piano overdubs added during post-production.)
5. Melanie – "My Beautiful People" (Melanie Safka)– 4:03
6. Melanie – "Birthday of the Sun" (Safka) – 3:35

Side four

1. Mountain – "Blood of the Sun" (Leslie West, Felix Pappalardi, Gail Collins) – 3:35
2. Mountain – "Theme for an Imaginary Western" (Jack Bruce, Pete Brown) – 5:03
3. Canned Heat – "Woodstock Boogie" (Bob Hite) – 13:48 (This is an edit of the performance that lasted over 27 minutes.)
4. Audience during Sunday rainstorm – "Let the Sunshine In" (Galt MacDermot, James Rado, Gerome Ragni) – 0:55

== Charts ==
Chart (1971)	Peak position	Certification
Australia (Kent Music Report)	12	
Billboard Top LPs	7	US: Gold
Canada Album Charts	6	
Dutch Album Charts	6	
Norwegian Album Charts	17	
