= Joe Terry (singer) =

American singer (1941–2019)

- Born: Joseph Angelo Terranova; January 30, 1941; Philadelphia, Pennsylvania, U.S.
- Died: April 15, 2019 (aged 78) Williamstown, New Jersey, U.S.
- Genres: Doo-wop
- Years active: 1957–2019

Joseph Angelo Terranova (January 30, 1941 – April 15, 2019), known professionally as Joe Terry, was an American singer and an original member of the doo-wop group Danny & the Juniors.

== Early life ==
Terranova was born on January 30, 1941 in Philadelphia, Pennsylvania

== Danny & the Juniors ==
Terry was the last member to join the group. He replaced another member named Artie Scotize after he quit due to stage fright. Joe first saw them perform at St. Francis de Sales Church in Philadelphia. He was already familiar with one of the members, Frank Maffei as they both went to electric shop together; and they would both sing and harmonize while in shop. It was then that Maffei told him about the group he's in and how they had just lost a member and invited Terry to audition.

After the group disbanded, it split up into two different groups; one led by Danny Rapp and another by Terry with other member Frank Maffei. He would perform as lead singer of Danny & the Juniors until his death in 2019.

== Personal life ==
Terry married Joyce Mancini in 1962 and had 3 children during their marriage; they later divorced.

Joe Terry died suddenly on April 15, 2019 at the age of 78 in his home in Williamstown, New Jersey.
