= Woodstock 94 (album) =

Live album by Various artists
- Released: November 8, 1994
- Recorded: August 12–15, 1994
- Genre: Rock
- Length: Disc 1: 1:12:03; Disc 2: 1:13:38
- Label: A&M
- Producer: Larry Hamby, Bob Clearmountain

Woodstock albums chronology
Woodstock Diary (1994)	Woodstock 94 (1994)	Woodstock 1999 (1999)

Professional ratings
Review scores
Source	Rating
Entertainment Weekly	(B)

Woodstock 94 is a two-disc set documenting the Woodstock 1994 festival. It was released during November 1994, nearly three months after the event took place. The album was released on A&M Records.

The set features 27 performing artists, one song per artist. It also features the recording of both general stage announcements and some band introductions given at various points during the festival.

Red Hot Chili Peppers's performance of "Blood Sugar Sex Magik" was nominated for the Best Hard Rock Performance, but lost to Pearl Jam's "Spin the Black Circle". Metallica's "For Whom the Bell Tolls" and Nine Inch Nails's "Happiness in Slavery" were both nominated for the Best Metal Performance, with the latter winning.

The album was certified Platinum by the Music Canada in 1994 and the Recording Industry Association of America in 1995. The DVD version was also certified Platinum.

== Track listing ==
=== Disc One ===
1. Live – "Selling the Drama" – 4:33
2. Blues Traveler – "But Anyway" – 4:18
3. Melissa Etheridge – "I'm the Only One" – 5:33
4. Joe Cocker – "Feelin' Alright" – 4:57
5. "Stage Announcement" – 1:22
6. The Cranberries – "Dreams" – 4:25
7. Blind Melon – "Soup" – 3:20
8. Green Day – "When I Come Around" – 3:01
9. Salt-n-Pepa – "Shoop" – 5:18
10. Tom Arnold – "Stage Announcement" – 0:53
11. Red Hot Chili Peppers – "Blood Sugar Sex Magik" – 5:21
12. Porno for Pyros – "Porno for Pyros" – 3:05
13. Primus – "Those Damned Blue Collar Tweekers" – 6:42
14. Jackyl – "Headed for Destruction" – 5:33
15. Aerosmith – "Draw the Line/F.I.N.E.*" – 9:45
16. Calvert DeForest – "Stage Announcement" – 0:10
17. Nine Inch Nails – "Happiness in Slavery" – 5:47

=== Disc Two ===
1. Metallica – "For Whom the Bell Tolls" – 7:23
2. Paul Rodgers featuring Slash, Jason Bonham, Neal Schon & Andy Fraser – "The Hunter" – 5:20
3. The Neville Brothers – "Come Together" – 3:53
4. Sheryl Crow – "Run Baby Run" – 5:27
5. Crosby, Stills & Nash – "Déjà Vu" – 7:18
6. Violent Femmes – "Dance, Motherfucker, Dance!/Kiss Off" – 6:30
7. Collective Soul – "Shine" – 5:58
8. Candlebox – "Arrow" – 3:35
9. Cypress Hill – "How I Could Just Kill a Man" – 3:22
10. Rollins Band – "Right Here Too Much" – 5:18
11. Bob Dylan – "Highway 61 Revisited" – 6:20
12. Traffic – "Pearly Queen" – 5:08
13. Peter Gabriel – "Biko" – 8:06

== Certifications ==
Region	Certification	Certified units/sales
Canada (Music Canada)	Platinum	100,000^{^}
United States (RIAA)	Platinum	1,000,000^{^}
United States (RIAA) DVD	Platinum	100,000^{^}
^{^} Shipments figures based on certification alone.
