= KB Feronikeli =

Professional basketball club in Kosovo

- Nickname: Tigrat e zi (Black Tigers)
- Leagues: Kosovo Basketball First League
- Arena: Palestra Sportive Drenas (1,000 seats)
- Location: Drenas, Kosovo
- Team colors: Black and Green
- Head coach: (Kosovo)
- Team captain: (Kosovo)
Home	Away

KB Feronikeli is a professional basketball club based in Drenas, Kosovo which last competed in the Kosovo First League. Its fan club is called Black Tigers.

== History ==
They were created in 2018 and with wild card they got promoted from the Second League to First League where they completed the season on first place and they currently got a place on Kosovo Basketball Superleague.

On November 22, 2019, Tyrone Garland signed with KB Feronikeli. He had 42 points in a game in December.

On the 30th March 2022, Feronikeli relegated from the Kosovo First League.

== Arena ==
The club currently plays in the City sport center, in the center of Drenas, with a capacity for around 1000 spectators.

== Players ==
=== 2019–2020 Roster ===
KB Feronikeli roster
Players
Coaches

Pos.	No.	Nat.	Name	Ht.	Wt.	Age
PG		(United States)	Storey, Kareem	1.83 m (6 ft 0 in)	80 kg (176 lb)	34 – 2 June 1992
PG	35	(United States)	Scott, Brandon	1.92 m (6 ft 4 in)	70 kg (154 lb)
G	6	(Kosovo)	Shala, Valdet
SG	1	(Kosovo)	Hajdari, Arti	1.78 m (5 ft 10 in)	74 kg (163 lb)	33 – 12 May 1993
G/F		(Kosovo)	Kovaqi, Beq	1.95 m (6 ft 5 in)	87 kg (192 lb)	33 – 9 June 1993
SF	10	(Kosovo)	Hajzeri, Sami	1.93 m (6 ft 4 in)
SF	5	(Kosovo)	Sholla, Erhan	1.98 m (6 ft 6 in)		25 – 10 February 2001
PF	22	(Kosovo)	Janjeva, Muhamedali	1.96 m (6 ft 5 in)	90 kg (198 lb)	27 – 28 October 1998
PF/C	12	(Kosovo)	Merovci, Mustafe (C)	2.03 m (6 ft 8 in)	100 kg (220 lb)
PF/C		(Kosovo)	Muric, Mirza	2.03 m (6 ft 8 in)	75 kg (165 lb)	28 – 17 October 1997

Head coach

(Kosovo)

Assistant coach(es)

- (Kosovo)
- (Kosovo)

Legend

- (C) Team captain
- Injured

=== Depth chart ===
Pos.	Starting 5	Bench 1	Bench 2	Bench 3
C	Mustafe Merovci	Mirza Muric
PF	Muhamedali Janjeva	Beq Kovaqi
SF	Erhan Sholla	Sami Hajzeri
SG	Arti Hajdari	Valdet Shala
PG	Brandon Scott	Kareem Storey	Desmond Gattis	Rinor Peci
