= Woodstock 1999 (album) =

Live album by various artists
- Released: October 19, 1999
- Recorded: July 23–25, 1999
- Genre: Rock, rap metal, nu metal, post-grunge, hip hop, punk rock, folk rock
- Length: 2:29:12
- Label: Epic
- Producer: Mitch Maketansky

Woodstock albums chronology
| Woodstock 94 (1994) | Woodstock 1999 (1999) | The Woodstock Experience (2009) |

Professional ratings
Review scores
| Source | Rating |
|---|---|
| AllMusic | 2/5 stars |

Woodstock 1999 is a two-CD live album recorded at the Woodstock '99 festival. It was released via Epic Records in October 1999, about three months after the event took place.

The set features one song from each of 32 performing artists. It also features the recording of the speech given when the fires got out of hand and the Red Hot Chili Peppers' performance was paused on the last day of the festival, on the track "Interlude" (disc one, track 16).

Each disc was also released separately with the titles Woodstock 1999 Vol. 1 – Red Album and Woodstock 1999 Vol. 2 – Blue Album.

The album was certified Gold by the Music Canada and the Recording Industry Association of America in 1999. The DVD version was certified Platinum in 2002.

== Track listing ==
Disc one

| No. | Title | Music | Length |
|---|---|---|---|
| 1. | "Blind" | Korn | 4:03 |
| 2. | "The Kids Aren't Alright" | The Offspring | 3:02 |
| 3. | "Four" | Lit | 3:04 |
| 4. | "Lit Up" | Buckcherry | 4:40 |
| 5. | "Bawitdaba" | Kid Rock | 4:16 |
| 6. | "Show Me What You Got" | Limp Bizkit | 3:44 |
| 7. | "Bulls on Parade" | Rage Against the Machine | 3:49 |
| 8. | "Creeping Death" | Metallica | 6:49 |
| 9. | "Roadhouse Blues" | Creed and Robby Krieger | 5:49 |
| 10. | "Bitch" | Sevendust | 5:23 |
| 11. | "Stop Being Greedy" | DMX | 2:20 |
| 12. | "Keep Away" | Godsmack | 4:39 |
| 13. | "A Secret Place" | Megadeth | 4:24 |
| 14. | "Everything Zen" | Bush | 6:18 |
| 15. | "I Alone" | Live | 6:00 |
| 16. | "Interlude" | | 1:15 |
| 17. | "Fire" | Red Hot Chili Peppers | 2:56 |

Disc two

| No. | Title | Music | Length |
|---|---|---|---|
| 1. | "Tripping Billies" | Dave Matthews Band | 5:23 |
| 2. | "Rock This Town" | The Brian Setzer Orchestra | 6:44 |
| 3. | "Down So Long" | Jewel | 5:39 |
| 4. | "Ends" | Everlast | 5:08 |
| 5. | "Santa Monica (Watch the World Die)" | Everclear | 5:18 |
| 6. | "If It Makes You Happy" | Sheryl Crow | 5:28 |
| 7. | "Alison" | Elvis Costello | 2:52 |
| 8. | "So Pure" | Alanis Morissette | 2:58 |
| 9. | "Black Capricorn Day" | Jamiroquai | 3:47 |
| 10. | "Cold Beverage" | G. Love & Special Sauce | 5:05 |
| 11. | "Block Rockin' Beats" | The Chemical Brothers | 4:03 |
| 12. | "Adrenaline" | The Roots | 4:15 |
| 13. | "Airport Song" | Guster | 3:30 |
| 14. | "Superman's Dead" | Our Lady Peace | 4:58 |
| 15. | "Ecstasy" | Rusted Root | 4:41 |
| 16. | "Resting Place" | Bruce Hornsby | 6:41 |

== Certifications ==
| Region | Certification | Certified units/sales |
|---|---|---|
| Canada (Music Canada) | Gold | 50,000^{^} |
| United States (RIAA) | Gold | 500,000^{^} |
| United States (RIAA) DVD | Platinum | 100,000^{^} |
^{^} Shipments figures based on certification alone.
