= Danny Rapp =

American singer (1941–1983)

- Born: Daniel Earl Rapp; May 9, 1941; Philadelphia, Pennsylvania, U.S.
- Died: April 4, 1983 (aged 41) Quartzsite, Arizona, U.S.
- Genres: Doo-wop
- Years active: 1955–1983
- Labels: Swan, ABC, Guyden, Mercury, Capitol

Daniel Earl Rapp (May 9, 1941 – April 4, 1983) was an American singer and the frontman for the group Danny & the Juniors. The group is best known for their 1958 hit "At the Hop".

== Career ==
Rapp's musical career began in 1955 with the formation of his group The Juvenairs, which later became known as Danny and the Juniors. Their 1957 song "Do the Bop" came to the attention of Dick Clark, who suggested they rename it to "At the Hop". After limited initial success with the song, it became a worldwide hit when it was played on American Bandstand. The Juniors went on to have two more hits "Rock and Roll Is Here to Stay" and "Twistin' USA". The Juniors released several more records in the 1960s but were not able to produce any more hits. In the 1970s, they capitalized on a strong 1950s nostalgia movement by touring and rerecording "At The Hop" in 1976.

Danny and the Juniors broke up and regrouped over the years, and split into two groups in 1978. One featured Joe Terranova and Frank Maffei, while the other featured Rapp with various backing singers. Both groups performed under the "Danny and the Juniors" name.

Rapp's last performance was in Phoenix, Arizona, at the Silver Lining Lounge of The Different Pointe restaurant in the Pointe Tapatio Resort in a month-long engagement which was scheduled to end on Saturday, April 2, 1983.

== Death ==
On Saturday, April 2, 1983, Rapp checked into the Yacht Club Motel in Quartzsite, Arizona, 165 miles (266 km) west of Phoenix. He was seen on Saturday drinking heavily in the Jigsaw, one of the two bars in town. Sometime over the weekend, he bought a .25-caliber automatic from a private individual.

Rapp's body was found in his hotel room on Monday, April 4, with a single self-inflicted gunshot wound to the right side of the head.

Danny is buried at New St. Mary's Cemetery & Mausoleum in Bellmawr, New Jersey.

== Personal life ==
Rapp married in 1962 and had two sons.
