= David White (musician) =

American singer and songwriter (1939–2019)

- Also known as: David White Tricker
- Born: David Ernest White; November 26, 1939; Philadelphia, Pennsylvania, U.S.
- Died: March 16, 2019 (aged 79) Las Vegas, Nevada, U.S.
- Genres: Pop; rock and roll
- Occupations: Singer; songwriter; arranger; record producer
- Instrument: Piano
- Years active: 1955–2019
- Formerly of: Danny & the Juniors
- Website: rockandrollisheretostay.com

David Ernest White (November 26, 1939 – March 16, 2019), also known as David White Tricker, was an American singer and songwriter. He formed the doo-wop quartet Danny & the Juniors, as well as being a founding member of the pop trio The Spokesmen. He wrote "Rock and Roll Is Here to Stay" and co-wrote a number of other hit songs, including "At the Hop", "You Don't Own Me", and "1-2-3".

== Early life ==
White was born in Philadelphia, Pennsylvania in 1939. Prior to attending school, White toured the country performing with his parents in their acrobatic/hand-balancing act called Barry and Brenda and Company. He started playing piano, trumpet and clarinet as a child, and began writing songs at the age of 14. He described first hearing R&B groups on the radio as "such a neat experience... We were never exposed to that kind of music before."

== The Juvenaires/Danny & the Juniors ==
In 1955, White auditioned friends and acquaintances from his neighborhood, to form a vocal group that he named The Juvenaires, in which he sang first tenor. The other original members were Danny Rapp (lead singer), Joe "Terry" Terranova (baritone), and Frank Maffei (second tenor).

The group was discovered by John Madara. In 1957, White and Madara wrote "Do the Bop" for the group. Madara, who had a chart record at the time called "Be My Girl" on Prep Records under the name of Johnny Madara, took The Juvenaires to his vocal coach/record producer, Artie Singer, for an audition. White said: "We recorded "Do the Bop" with Johnny Madara singing lead vocals and my group, The Juvenaires, backing him up. Artie took it to Johnny's label, Prep Records, but they turned it down. Artie then took it to Dick Clark, who suggested the title change to "At the Hop". Artie changed some of the lyrics and became a co-writer. We went back into the recording studio and this time, my group recorded the song with Danny singing lead. Artie took it back to Dick Clark and gave him half the publishing of the song.” The song was recorded at Reco-Art Studios in Philadelphia, together with a ballad by White called "Sometimes (When I'm All Alone)".

The Juvenaires were renamed Danny & the Juniors, since it was a more contemporary name, and "At the Hop" backed with "Sometimes (When I'm All Alone)" was released on Singular Records, Artie Singer's label with partner, disc jockey Larry Brown. Payola was not illegal at the time and Singer reluctantly gave Dick Clark half the publishing of "At the Hop", which Clark later sold prior to the payola hearings in 1960. "Sometimes (When I'm All Alone)" became a favorite of a lot of street corner groups just starting out who later became successful, including The Capris, The Chimes, The Cleftones, The Rascals, The Del Satins, The Dovells, The Elegants, The Impalas, The Earls, Randy & the Rainbows, The Tokens, The Vogues, and Vito & the Salutations, among others.

White was now attending Temple University on a full gymnastics scholarship, but when Dick Clark started playing "At the Hop", he left college, never to return, instead going over to Danny Rapp's house every weekday to watch American Bandstand. "At the Hop" went to number one on the Billboard Chart, a position it would hold for seven weeks, breaking a record for vocal group chart position. It was also number one on the R&B chart for five weeks, and stayed in the top forty for eighteen weeks. "At the Hop" is featured in quite a few films, most notably, American Graffiti and Woodstock (performed by Sha Na Na). Singular Records could not handle the distribution of such a hot record, so Singer sold the master to ABC Paramount Records. Danny and the Juniors' follow-up record was White's composition "Rock and Roll Is Here to Stay", which went to number nineteen on the Billboard Chart and has become a rock and roll anthem. It is featured in the films Grease (performed by Sha Na Na) and Christine, among others.

White had several other chart records while with the group, including "Dottie" (No. 39 in Billboard), "Twistin' USA" (No. 27 in Billboard), "Pony Express" (No. 60 in Billboard), "Twistin' All Night Long" (No. 68 in Billboard), "Back to the Hop" (No. 80 in Billboard), "Doin' the Continental Walk" (No. 93 in Billboard), and "Oo-La-La-Limbo" (No. 99 in Billboard). White said in a later interview: "Back then, you would give a DJ a bottle of booze, and he'd play your record. You could just walk into a recording studio. We were making three or four records a week..."

White appeared with Danny and the Juniors in the 1958 film Let's Rock and while touring with them he appeared at The New York Paramount with Alan Freed and The Apollo in Harlem with "Jocko" Henderson. Some other appearances with the group include Patti Page's The Big Record, Merv Griffin's Saturday Night Prom, The Pat Boone Chevy Showroom, and Dick Clark's Saturday Night Beechnut Show.

White left the group in 1959, but continued to appear and record with them occasionally until the early 1970s.

== Partnership with John Madara ==
In 1960, White teamed up with John Madara, forming Madara and White Productions. One of their first efforts was producing the musical track and writing "The Fly" (No. 7 in Billboard) for Chubby Checker.

In an independent production deal with Mercury Records, White and Madara composed "You Don't Own Me" for Lesley Gore (No. 2 in Billboard). This song has become an anthem for women's rights and is featured in several motion pictures, including Dirty Dancing, Hairspray, and The First Wives Club.

White arranged and performed background vocals for Debby Boone and Bernadette Peters, appearing with Bernadette on The Tonight Show and The Tim Conway Show.

Moving on to Decca Records, White and Madara produced "1-2-3" (No. 2 in Billboard), co-writing it with Len Barry. This song is also featured in several motion pictures, including Mr. Holland's Opus.

Some other hits that Madara and White co-wrote and co-produced include "Birthday Party" (No. 40 in Billboard), "442 Glenwood Avenue" (No. 56 in Billboard) and "Cold Cold Winter" (No. 79 in Billboard), all for The Pixies Three; "Pop-Pop-Pop-Pie" (No. 35 in Billboard) for The Sherrys; and "The Boy Next Door" (No. 18 in Billboard) for The Secrets. “Today’s The Day” (No. 91 in Billboard) for Maureen Gray.

=== The Spokesmen ===
At Decca, White, Madara, and disc jockey Ray Gilmore formed and became members of The Spokesmen. Madara and White co-produced "Dawn of Correction" (No. 36 in Billboard) for them, co-writing the song with Gilmore. The Spokesmen recorded an album and made appearances on The Mike Douglas Show, Shindig!, Shivaree, Where the Action Is, and Hollywood A Go-Go, among others. White and Madara along with Gilmore also wrote "Sadie (The Cleaning Lady)", recorded by Johnny Farnham, which became a number one record in Australia.

== Later career ==
White then wrote and co-produced "The Thought of Loving You" for The Crystal Mansion, of which he became a member. It has been covered by Cher, The Manhattan Transfer, Astrud Gilberto, Lou Christie, The Spiral Starecase, and Wayne Newton.

In 1971, White recorded a Brooks Arthur-produced solo album for Bell Records titled Pastel, Paint, Pencil and Ink under the name of David White Tricker (Tricker being his family name).

He lectured at a community college and studied film scoring and orchestration at UCLA Extension.

== Personal life ==
In 1959, at the age of 19, White married 16-year-old Joanne "Dee" Rody. The marriage lasted 12 years and produced three children: Wendy, Linda, and Jody. Linda died in 2013. In 1998, White married Sandra Simone. He and Simone were actively engaged in writing, producing, and discovering new talent.

David White died in Las Vegas, Nevada, on March 16, 2019, at the age of 79. His daughter, Wendy, said he died of lung and throat cancer.

== Awards and honors ==
In 1991, White's piano was donated to The Rock and Roll Hall of Fame in Cleveland, Ohio. In 1992, White and Danny & the Juniors were inducted into The Hall of Fame and Walk of Fame in Philadelphia by The Philadelphia Music Alliance. In 2003, Danny & the Juniors were inducted into The Vocal Group Hall of Fame in Sharon, Pennsylvania. In 2013, White and Danny and the Juniors were inducted into The Broadcast Pioneers Hall of Fame in Philadelphia. Also in 2013, White and John Madara were inducted into The Walk of Fame by The Philadelphia Music Alliance.
