= Mark Corallo =

American political consultant

Mark Corallo (born February 8, 1966) is an American political communications and public relations professional, who is the co-founder and co-principal of Corallo Comstock. A Republican, he formed Corallo Media Strategies, a public relations firm. He was the communications director for the U.S. Department of Justice under Attorney General John Ashcroft, and later became a senior adviser with The Ashcroft Group.

== Corallo Comstock ==
Corallo formed his newest firm with Barbara Comstock, who served as his predecessor as Public Affairs Director at the Department of Justice until 2003, and prior to that, as Republican National Committee opposition research director. Corallo decided to convert his previous one-man shop into a joint operation after conversations with the Hearst Corporation, one of his clients, about hiring additional representation for their matter. Corallo recommended Comstock, who, like Corallo, had assisted the defense team of Scooter Libby. Hearst has hired Corallo and Comstock to support Hearst's attempts to quash a subpoena to compel testimony by two San Francisco Chronicle journalists who broke the story of the BALCO steroids investigation.

== Career ==
From 1996 to 1999, he served as press secretary to U.S. Representative and Chairman of the House Appropriations Committee, Bob Livingston (R-LA), as Livingston was forced to step aside as the incoming speaker of the House in 1998 after admitting an extramarital affair.

In December 1998, during the House debate over the Clinton impeachment, Speaker-elect Bob Livingston, whose own claimed infidelities were soon to be exposed, allegedly called for ending the impeachment process. Corallo, then Livingston's press secretary, is alleged to have urged his boss to continue with the process. Clinton was later impeached for perjury in the U.S. House of Representatives, but acquitted in the U.S. Senate. From 1999 to 2002, Corallo was the Communications Director for the United States House of Representatives Committee on Government Reform, taking a leave of absence during the 2000 presidential campaign season to serve as press secretary for Victory 2000, the Republican National Committee's official campaign effort.

Corallo was chief spokesman for U.S. Attorney General John Ashcroft from 2002 to 2005, as the Public Affairs Director for the Department of Justice. The American Civil Liberties Union (ACLU) has compiled numerous examples of statements Corallo made during that period which the ACLU believes misrepresent the department's understanding of the USA Patriot Act and which were designed to mislead the press about the scope of Justice Department actions.

Shortly before the indictment of I. Lewis "Scooter" Libby, Vice President Dick Cheney's chief of staff, related to Libby's alleged involvement in the outing of Valerie Plame, Corallo became a part of Karl Rove's "public relations defense team." Corallo spoke to the media on Rove's behalf, and correctly denied reports that Rove was under indictment for his involvement in "Plamegate".

In 2007 he was spokesman for possible Republican presidential candidate Fred Thompson. He also called for the resignation of Attorney General Alberto Gonzales around the same time.

Corallo quit a public relations advisory role with Blackwater Worldwide in 2006; he said that "they do have a few cowboys" and that some of its executives were "rather disdainful of anything that goes to oversight and due process." Since then he has been a spokesman for Blackwater's founder, Erik Prince, a longtime friend whom he calls "a visionary."

Corallo was the spokesman for President Donald Trump's private legal team during the investigation into possible collusion between members of Trump's 2016 campaign and the Russian government. Corallo resigned that position on July 20, 2017. Former FBI Director Robert Mueller interviewed Corallo as part of the Office of the Special Counsel investigation.

Attorney Victoria Toensing represents Corallo.

== Personal life ==
Corallo is a veteran of the U.S. Army Infantry and is a graduate of Georgetown University (BA). He is married and has four children.
