= Artie Singer =

- Born: February 1, 1919; Toronto, Ontario, Canada
- Died: May 2, 2008 (aged 89); King of Prussia, Pennsylvania, US
- Occupation(s): songwriter, music producer and bandleader

Arthur Singer (February 1, 1919 – May 2, 2008) was an American songwriter, music producer and bandleader. He was the co-writer and producer of the songs "At the Hop" and "Rock and Roll Is Here To Stay" by Danny & the Juniors.

== Career ==
Singer began his career as a bass player and performed on WIP radio and on the TV Show Paul Whiteman's Goodyear Revue. He became well known as a vocal coach with his brother Harold, whose students included Frankie Avalon, Chubby Checker, Al Martino and Bobby Rydell, and he was a vocal coach to Danny Kaye in the early 1950s. Singer wrote hundred of songs for the educational children's TV program Gina D's Kids Club. He also led the Artie Singer Orchestra.

As a songwriter, music producer and orchestra conductor, Singer's most famous songs were the hits "At the Hop" and "Rock and Roll Is Here to Stay", released in 1957 and 1958, respectively. The songs were originally recorded by Danny & the Juniors. "At the Hop", which Singer co-wrote with John Medora and David White, reached number one on the Billboard Top 100 on January 6, 1958, and remained there for seven consecutive weeks. It was also the number one song of the year. He wrote the score to a Broadway musical, "Dream Weavers" with lyricist Marjorie Badarak, but it was never produced.

== Payola involvement ==
On the 2008 nationally-televised PBS documentary Wages of Spin: Dick Clark, American Bandstand and the Payola Scandals, Artie Singer claimed that Dick Clark would not play "At the Hop", the hit song Singer co-wrote, without receiving half of the publishing proceeds. Singer agreed to make the payments and called the situation "bittersweet" because although he did not like having to give the money, he credited his success in the music industry to Clark and therefore was grateful to him. Payola was not illegal at the time and Clark sold the song prior to the 1960 payola hearings.

== Personal life ==
Singer was born in Toronto, Ontario, Canada and moved to Buffalo, New York, to Brooklyn, and eventually to Philadelphia, where he graduated from Simon Gratz High School. The son of a Jewish cantor, Singer performed at High Holiday services at local synagogues for over 50 years. He was married twice. He and his first wife, Esther (Ivry), deceased, had a son, Richard, and daughter, Marcy Domosh, and two grandchildren. Singer resided in King of Prussia, Pennsylvania, when he died on May 2, 2008, at age 89.
