= RealGM =

Sports website

- Website type: Sports website
- Founded: 2000
- Website: realgm.com
- Commercial: Yes

RealGM.com is a sports website created in 2000. The site was originally a basketball site, but has since expanded its scope to provide information about American football, baseball, ice hockey and soccer. According to Alexa, the site ranked in the top 5000 of most visited sites in January 2009. The site includes basketball team forums as well as off-topic, media, and graphic arts forums. The site also offers the sale of sporting event tickets. It focuses its news mainly on players and their movement and actions in their respective leagues.

== In the media ==
CBSSports.com wrote that the core writers at RealGM.com "have produced quality work over the years". Sports Business Journal called the site "one of the most influential independent voices within basketball".

In 2005, a thread on the RealGM.com forum was mentioned as a source of motivation for Washington Wizards guard Juan Dixon after a playoff game in which he scored 35 points. Dixon told reporters that he had been notified by one of his friends of a thread in the RealGM forum entitled "The Amazingly [starts with "S" and rhymes with plucky] Juan Dixon Thread." Dixon said that the thread gave him extra motivation to be able to throw it back in their face. Forum members mentioned that they felt entitled after hearing that they had motivated Dixon.

In 2008, Chris Bosh submitted a video on his YouTube channel cboshtv in which he asked RealGM members to upload videos and ask him anything.

In 2012, a RealGM poll was mentioned by Ernie Johnson of the TNT broadcast team during a 2012 playoff game between the Oklahoma City Thunder and the San Antonio Spurs. The poll asked RealGM users to vote on which TNT commentator they thought would make the best NBA General Manager. The poll results indicated that 37.7% of users voted for Kenny Smith, 26.9% voted for Reggie Miller, 16.5% voted for Charles Barkley, 12.2% voted for Chris Webber, and 6.8% voted for Shaquille O'Neal. These results prompted Barkley to say "those people know absolutely nothing".

In late 2013, a group of Milwaukee Bucks fans who populate the highly active Bucks Forum crowd-funded the creation of a local billboard designed to encourage the local ownership of the team to scrap their long-held commitment to mediocrity and, instead, focus on a youth-driven rebuilding process. The billboard received national attention, from Sporting News, Deadspin, Yahoo! Sports, and other media entities.
