= Let's Rock =

1958 film

- Directed by: Harry Foster
- Written by: Hal Hackady
- Produced by: Harry Foster
- Starring: Julius LaRosa; Phyllis Newman; Conrad Janis
- Cinematography: Jack Etra
- Edited by: S. Charles Rawson
- Music by: Tony Pastor
- Distributed by: Columbia Pictures
- Release date: June 1958
- Running time: 79 minutes
- Country: United States
- Language: English

Let's Rock (known as Keep It Cool in the United Kingdom) is a 1958 rock and roll film starring Julius LaRosa as a crooner attempting to fight off the rival music rock and roll, Phyllis Newman as his songwriting girlfriend who convinces him to adapt rather than fight and Conrad Janis as LaRosa's manager. The film, another rock-exploitation film aimed at the teenage drive-in crowd, was produced and directed by Harry Foster and also features performances from the Tyrones, Paul Anka, Wink Martindale, Roy Hamilton, Danny & the Juniors and the Royal Teens.

== Plot ==
Singer's girlfriend helps him adapt to the new trend of rock'n'roll music.

== Cast ==
- Julius LaRosa as Tommy Adane
- Phyllis Newman as Kathy Abbott
- Conrad Janis as Charlie
- Joy Harmon as Pickup Girl (as Joy Harman)
- Paul Anka as himself
- Danny and the Juniors as Themselves - Performers ('At The Hop')
- Roy Hamilton as himself
- Wink Martindale as himself
- Della Reese as herself
- The Royal Teens as Themselves
- Al DeNittis as Tyrones Saxophonist (as the Tyrones)
- Tyrone DeNittis as himself (as the Tyrones)
- George Lesser as Tyrones Singer (as the Tyrones)
- Paul Sherman as himself / MC
- Harold Gary as Shep Harris
