= Danny & the Juniors =

American doo-wop and rock and roll vocal group

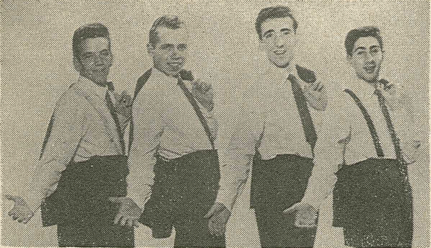
- From left to right: Danny Rapp, David White, Joe Terry, Frank Maffei

Background information
- Also known as: The Juvenaires (1955-1957); Danny & the Juniors featuring Joe Terry (c. 1983-2019)
- Origin: Philadelphia, Pennsylvania, United States
- Genres: Doo-wop, rock and roll
- Years active: 1955–1964, 1968–2019
- Labels: Swan, ABC, Guyden, Mercury, Capitol, His Master's Voice
- Past members: Danny Rapp; David White; Joe Terry; Frank Maffei; Bobby Maffei

Danny & the Juniors were an American doo-wop and rock and roll vocal group formed in Philadelphia, Pennsylvania. Originally consisting of Danny Rapp, Dave White, Frank Maffei, and Joe "Terry" Terranova, the group was formed in 1955. They are best known for their 1957 no. 1 hit "At the Hop" and their 1958 follow-up hit "Rock and Roll Is Here to Stay".

== 1950s ==
Danny Rapp (lead), Frank Maffei (second tenor), Joe Terranova (a.k.a. Joe Terry) (baritone), and Dave White Tricker (a.k.a. Dave White) (first tenor) met at John Bartram High School and started singing together in the mid-1950s. Known as the Juvenaires at the time, they sang at school parties and other local events. Local record producer John Madara took notice of them and introduced them to local DJs Larry Brown and Artie Singer, who had a record label known as Singular Records. In 1957, as Johnny Madara and The Juvenaires, they recorded a song written by Madara and White, "Do the Bop". Singer took it to a fellow DJ named Dick Clark. Clark liked it and suggested changing their name to the Juniors and renaming their song. The song was recorded as "At the Hop", this time with Danny Rapp on the lead vocal. Changing "Let's all do the bop" to "Let's go to the Hop" proved to be successful, and it became a local hit in June 1957. In December 1957, they received a call from Dick Clark to be a last-minute substitution for a no-show band on American Bandstand, and they performed it for a national audience. The song became a nationwide hit after ABC Paramount bought the master recording and issued it in January 1958. They soon appeared on The Pat Boone Chevy Showroom and other national TV shows. Soon after, they recorded "Rock and Roll Is Here To Stay" and "Dottie", both of which charted. In the fall of 1957, David began attending Temple University and was on the gym team, but quit school when the group started making personal appearances.

"At the Hop" reached no. 1 on the Billboard pop singles chart and the R&B singles chart in 1958. In the UK that year, "At the Hop" reached no. 3 on the Record Retailers (RR) chart. "At the Hop" returned to the Top 40 in the UK in 1976, reaching no. 39 on the Record Retailers chart.

The group appeared in the 1958 jukebox musical Let's Rock with Julius LaRosa, Paul Anka, and The Royal Teens. They performed "At the Hop".

== 1960s ==
In 1960, the band was signed to Dick Clark's Swan Records label, and they released one more record, "Twistin' USA". It made it into the Top 40, and became their final hit single. They went on to release several more singles, but were not able to repeat their earlier successes.

White left the group to concentrate on writing and production either in 1959, or sometime near the end of the band's recording career in the early 1960s. He was very successful in this venture, composing a number of hits, including "You Don't Own Me" for Lesley Gore, and "1-2-3" and "Like a Baby" for Len Barry.

Through the rest of the 1960s, the Juniors also appeared on Guyden Records, Mercury Records, and Luv Records (a subsidiary of Bell Records); they split in 1964 before reuniting in 1968 to re-record "Rock 'n' Roll Is Here To Stay" for Luv Records.

In 1973, they re-recorded "At the Hop" for Crunch Records, which was owned by the same company that owned their ABC-Paramount Records master recordings.

== 1970s to the present ==
In 1976, "At the Hop" was re-issued, and it made its way into the Top 40 of the UK Singles Chart, reaching no. 39. The single was commercially used for the Canadian National Exhibition, changing the words to "Let's go to the Ex" rather than "Let's go to the hop." It was parodied by the band Dash Rip Rock with their single entitled "Let's Go Smoke Some Pot", and by NRBQ during the 1973 energy crisis under the title "Get That Gasoline".

The group appeared in the 1973 Columbia Pictures concert film Let the Good Times Roll hosted by Richard Nader. This was one of the first 1950s-themed nostalgia films.

Billy Carlucci, Joe "Terry" Terranova, and Frank Maffei appeared on season 3, episode 3, of the syndicated series Sha Na Na as Danny and the Juniors performing "At the Hop", "Twistin' U.S.A.", and "Rock and Roll is Here to Stay".

Danny & the Juniors, featuring Joe Terry, continued to tour, with Terranova singing lead, along with Maffei, and Maffei's brother Bobby. They appeared at music festivals in England following the release of their Swan recordings by Rollercoaster Records, who had acquired the original master tapes.

In 2003, the group was inducted into the Vocal Group Hall of Fame; they performed "Rock and Roll Is Here to Stay" at the Vocal Group Hall of Fame's 2004 concert.

From September 2011, Frank Maffei and Terranova presented an hour-long rock'n'roll radio special for London's Covent Garden Radio in the UK.

Since July 2025, later addition Bobby Maffei is the only surviving member.

=== Personnel deaths ===
Danny Rapp was found dead in a hotel in Quartzsite, Arizona on April 4, 1983, an apparent gunshot suicide. He was 41.

David White died in Las Vegas, Nevada, March 16, 2019, at the age of 79; his daughter Wendy said he died of lung and throat cancer.

Joe Terranova died on April 15, 2019, at the age of 78.

Frank Maffei died on July 19, 2025, at the age of 85.

== Members ==
- Danny Rapp (born Daniel Earl Rapp, May 9, 1941, Philadelphia – died April 5, 1983) — lead vocals (1958–1983; his death)
- Joe Terry (born Joseph Angelo Terranova, January 30, 1941, Philadelphia – died April 15, 2019) — lead and baritone vocals (1958–2019; his death)
- Dave White (born David Ernest White, November 26, 1939, Philadelphia – died March 16, 2019) — first tenor vocals (1958–early 1960s; died 2019)
- Frank Maffei (born December 15, 1939, Philadelphia – died July 19, 2025) — baritone and second tenor vocals (1958–2019; died 2025)
- Bobby Maffei (born December 14, 1940, Philadelphia) — first tenor vocals (c. 1983–2019)
- Billy Carlucci - vocals
- Jimmy Testa - vocals
- Johnny Petillo - vocals
- Bobby Love - vocals

== Awards and recognition ==
Danny & the Juniors were inducted into The Vocal Group Hall of Fame in 2003, and the group was inducted into the Broadcast Pioneers of Philadelphia Hall of Fame on November 22, 2013.

== Singles ==
Year	Title	US Billboard Hot 100	US Cashbox	US Billboard R&B	Canada CHUM Chart	UK	Label (US)
1957	"Do the Bop" b/w "Sometimes"	--	--	--	--	--	Singular
1957	"At the Hop" b/w "Sometimes"	--	--	--	--	--	Singular 711
1957	"At the Hop" b/w "Sometimes (When I'm All Alone)"	1	1	1	1	3	ABC-Paramount 9871
1958	"Rock and Roll Is Here to Stay" / "School Boy Romance"	19	16	16	16	--	ABC-Paramount 9888
1958	"Dottie" / "In The Meantime"	39	--	--	--	--	ABC-Paramount 9926
1958	"A Thief" / "Crazy Cave"	--	--	--	--	--	ABC-Paramount 9953
1958	"Sassy Fran" / "I Feel So Lonely"	--	--	--	--	--	ABC-Paramount 9978
1959	"Do You Love Me" / "Somehow I Can't Forget"	--	--	--	--	--	ABC-Paramount 10004
1959	"Playing Hard To Get" / "Of Love"	--	--	--	--	--	ABC-Paramount 10052
1960	"Twistin' U.S.A." / "A Thousand Miles Away"	27	--	--	10	--	Swan 4060
1960	"Candy Cane, Sugary Plum" / "Oh Holy Night"	--	--	--	--	--	Swan 4064
1961	"Pony Express" / "Daydreamer"	60	--	--	16	--	Swan 4068
1961	"Cha Cha Go Go (Chicago Cha-Cha)" / "Mister Whisper"	--	--	--	--	--	Swan 4072
1961	"Back To The Hop" / "The Charleston Fish"	80	--	--	--	--	Swan 4082
1962	"Twistin' All Night Long" (with Freddy Cannon) / "Some Kind Of Nut"	68	--	--	--	--	Swan 4092
1962	"Doin' The Continental Walk" / "(Do The) Mashed Potatoes"	93	--	--	--	--	Swan 4100
1962	"Funny" / "We Got Soul"	--	--	--	--	--	Swan 4113
1962	"Oo-La-La-Limbo" / "Now And Then"	99	--	--	27	27	Guyden 2076
1964	"Sad Girl" / "Let's Go Ski-ing"	--	--	--	--	--	Mercury 72240
1968	"Rock and Roll Is Here to Stay" (re-recording) b/w "Sometimes (When I'm All Alone)"	--	--	--	--	--	Luv 252
1973	"At the Hop" / "Let the Good Times Roll"	--	--	--	--	--	Crunch 018001
1973	"At the Hop" / "Rock And Roll Is Here To Stay"	--	--	--	--	--	Roulette GG-121
1973	"At the Hop" / "Rock And Roll Is Here To Stay"	--	--	--	--	--	MCA D-2411
1976	"At the Hop" / "Rock And Roll Is Here To Stay"	--	--	--	--	--	

== Albums ==
Despite the sizable output released by Danny & The Juniors from the late 1950s to early 1960s, no albums were released during that time. The first compilation album was released in 1983: Rockin' With Danny and The Juniors on MCA; this was followed over the years by several other compilations on vinyl and CD.
