= At the Hop =

Single by Danny & the Juniors
- B-side: "Sometimes (When I'm All Alone)"
- Released: November 4, 1957
- Genre: Rock and roll
- Length: 2:39
- Label: ABC
- Songwriters: Artie Singer; John Medora; David White
- Producers: John Medora; David White

"At the Hop" is a 1950s pop song written by Artie Singer, John Medora, and David White and originally released by Danny & the Juniors. The song was first issued circa October 1957 on a small Philadelphia label (Singular 711) and included a countdown, before being acquired by ABC-Paramount and reissued as ABC-Paramount 9871 in November. It reached number one on the Cash Box and Billboard charts in January, becoming one of the top-selling singles of 1958. "At the Hop" also hit number one on the R&B Best Sellers list. Somewhat more surprisingly, the record reached number 3 on the Music Vendor country charts. It was also a commercially successful hit elsewhere, including reaching number 1 for 3 weeks in Canada and peaking at number 3 on the UK charts.

The song returned to prominence after it was performed by rock and roll revival act Sha Na Na at the 1969 Woodstock Festival and featured in the 1973 coming-of-age teen comedy American Graffiti. Musically, it is notable for combining several of the most popular formulas in 1950s rock'n'roll, the twelve-bar blues, boogie-woogie piano, and the '50s progression.

The original version by Danny & the Juniors was included in Robert Christgau's "Basic Record Library" of 1950s and 1960s recordings, published in Christgau's Record Guide: Rock Albums of the Seventies (1981).

== Background ==
The song was written by White, Medora, and Singer in 1957, when Danny & the Juniors was then called The Juvenairs. Initially called "Do the Bop", the song was heard by Dick Clark, who expressed concern that the dance fad of doing The Bop was on its way out, so he suggested they change the band name to the Juniors and the chorus from "Let's all do the Bop" to "Let's go to the Hop". After they performed the song on Clark's show American Bandstand, it gained popularity and went to the top of the US charts, remaining at number one for five weeks.

The song describes the scene at a record hop, particularly the dances being performed and the interaction with the disc jockey host.

A sample of the song's lyrics (contemporary popular dances in italics):

You can rock it you can roll it
Do the stomp and even stroll it
At the hop.
When the record starts spinnin'
You chalypso and you chicken at the hop
Do the dance sensations that are sweepin' the nation
at the hop

== Payola involvement ==
On the 2008 televised PBS documentary Wages of Spin: Dick Clark, American Bandstand and the Payola Scandals, Artie Singer claimed that Dick Clark would not play "At the Hop" without receiving half of the publishing proceeds. Singer agreed to make the payments and called the situation "bittersweet" because although he did not like having to give the money, he credited his success in the music industry to Clark and therefore was grateful to him. Payola was not illegal at the time and Clark sold the song prior to the 1960 payola hearings.

== Cover versions ==
- Frankie Avalon, Chubby Checker, and Len Barry have recorded the song.
- "At The Hop" was covered by Austrian singer Freddy Quinn in 1958.
- Singer Nick Todd, brother of Pat Boone, reached the Billboard Top 100 with his cover, which peaked at number 21.
- The song was part of Uriah Heep's song "Rock'n'Roll Medley", to be found on 1973's Uriah Heep Live.
- The Delltones released a version of ("At The Hop") on their 1983 album ("Bop 'Till Ya Drop").
- The song was covered and recorded between October 1984 and January 1985 by The Beach Boys for their 1985 self-titled album, though it never made the final cut.
- Children's entertainers Sharon, Lois & Bram covered the song on their 1995 album titled Let's Dance!.

== Soundtrack appearances ==
- The song appeared in the 1958 jukebox musical film Let's Rock, or Keep It Cool in the UK, performed by Danny and the Juniors.
- "At the Hop" was performed at Woodstock by Sha-Na-Na in August 1969, and was included on the soundtrack album.
- Danny and the Juniors performed the song in the 1973 Columbia Pictures 1950s-themed nostalgia film Let the Good Times Roll.
- It was performed by Flash Cadillac & the Continental Kids and included on the soundtrack for the 1973 film American Graffiti. This recording was produced by Kim Fowley.
- It is played frequently in the American radio program The Savage Nation, hosted by talk show host Michael Savage.
- The song is sampled in the 1989 song "Swing the Mood" by Jive Bunny and the Mastermixers.
- The song is used in the Netflix animated series Kid Cosmic.

== Album appearances ==
The song appears on the following compilation albums.

- A Million or More Best Sellers, ABC-Paramount, 1958 (ABC 216)
- At the Hop, ABC Records, 1978 (AA-1111/2)
- Party Time Fifties, JCI, 1985, LP and CD (JCI 3201)
- Vintage Music, Volume One, MCA Records, 1986 (MCA-1429), CD (MCA-31198)

A live recording is included on the soundtrack album Let the Good Times Roll, Bell Records, 1973 (Bell 9002), and re-issued on Let the Good Times Roll Again, Arista Records, 1982 (ABM 2004).

== See also ==
- List of Billboard number-one rhythm and blues hits
- List of Billboard number-one singles of 1958
- Billboard year-end top 50 singles of 1958
- List of Cash Box Top 100 number-one singles of 1958
- List of CHUM number-one singles of 1957
