= John Medora =

American singer

- Also known as: John/Johnny Madara
- Born: John L. Medora; May 28, 1936 (age 90); Philadelphia, Pennsylvania, U.S.
- Genres: Rock; soul; soft rock
- Occupations: Singer; songwriter; record producer
- Years active: 1957–present
- Labels: Cameo-Parkway; Chancellor; Swan; Capitol; Mercury; Decca; CBS; Warner Bros.; Polydor; Atlantic; Paramount; 20th Century; MGM; ABC

John L. Medora (born May 28, 1936), also known as John or Johnny Madara, is an American singer, songwriter, composer and record producer best known to have teamed up with David White and Arthur Singer to write the 1957 hit song "At the Hop".

== Early life ==
Medora was born in Philadelphia, Pennsylvania, in 1936. His family lived in public housing known as "projects" located in south Philadelphia. He was the only one of six children interested in music. He took vocal lessons and began his career as a musical artist. His first recording was released in 1957 and became a hit record single "Be My Girl".

== Career ==
Later in 1957 he wrote a song called "Do the Bop" with Dave White. The "Bop" was a popular dance on the TV show, American Bandstand. Dave White was a member of a local group 'The Juvenaires' and they recorded the song with Madara on lead vocal. Local DJ Artie Singer got a co-writers' credit for the song. He took the record to Dick Clark, the host of American Bandstand. Clark suggested some changes. The lyrics and title were changed to "At the Hop", The Juvenaires became Danny and the Juniors. They recorded the song, this time with Danny Rapp on lead vocal. It became a US number 1 and international hit. He later co-wrote other hits including "1-2-3" for Len Barry, and "You Don't Own Me" for Lesley Gore.

In 1965, he and White co-wrote and performed, as the Spokesmen, the song "Dawn of Correction", an answer song to Barry McGuire's hit "Eve of Destruction". The song reached number 36 on the Billboard Hot 100. The pair also formed their own publishing company which was later sold to Michael Jackson. Madara also worked as a record producer, and discovered both Leon Huff and Kenny Gamble (Gamble and Huff), later a successful songwriter and producer attributed to pioneering the style of music known as Philly Soul, and the recording artist Hall and Oates.

Medora spent two years in Las Vegas working with one of the most successful performers of all time, Wayne Newton. He produced two of his albums and further produced and wrote songs for a Christmas television special for Wayne Newton on CBS. In the mid 1970s he moved to Los Angeles, and produced music for movies including Cinderella Liberty and Hey Good Lookin', as well as for television.

== Film soundtracks ==
Songs have appeared on some of the biggest grossing soundtrack albums of all time, including American Graffiti and Woodstock ("At The Hop"), Grease ("Rock and Roll is Here to Stay"), Hairspray ("The Fly" and "You Don't Own Me"), Mr. Holland's Opus ("1-2-3"), and Dirty Dancing and The First Wives Club ("You Don't Own Me"). It was the 1996 hit film, The First Wives Club, that not only featured "You Don't Own Me", but it was used as the theme of the movie. On November 27, 2016, the song was announced to be inducted into the Grammy Hall of Fame.
