= List of Atlanta Rhythm Section members =

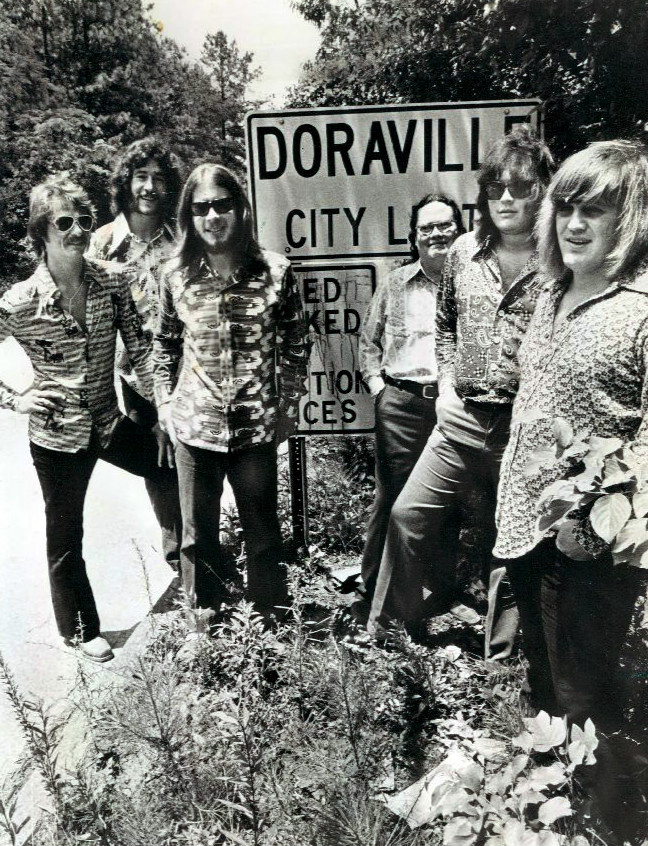
Atlanta Rhythm Section in 1977. From left to right: J. R. Cobb (guitar), Ronnie Hammond (vocals), Barry Bailey (guitar), Paul Goddard (bass), Robert Nix (drums), Dean Daughtry (keyboards).

Atlanta Rhythm Section (ARS) is an American Southern rock band from Doraville, Georgia. Formed in the summer of 1971, the group originally featured vocalist Rodney Justo, guitarist Barry Bailey, bassist Paul Goddard, keyboardist Dean Daughtry and drummer Robert Nix. This lineup featuring Ronnie Hammond as Justo's replacement became the groups classic lineup. The band's current lineup includes Justo, guitarist Steve "Clean" Stone (since 1986), bassist Justin Senker (from 1992 to 2011, and since 2014), guitarist David Anderson (since 2007), drummer Rodger Stephan (since 2016), and Lee Shealy (keyboards).

== History ==
=== 1971–1983 ===
ARS was originally conceived by producer and songwriter Buddy Buie as the house band of Studio One, a recording studio in Doraville. The group signed with Decca Records and began recording its own material in August 1971, before recording its self-titled debut album in November. By the time the album was released in January 1972, James "J. R." Cobb had joined on rhythm guitar. After touring for a few months, Justo left ARS to move to New York, dissatisfied with the album's reception. He was replaced by Ronnie Hammond. With its new lineup, the group released seven albums over the course of seven years – Back Up Against the Wall in 1973, Third Annual Pipe Dream in 1974, Dog Days in 1975, Red Tape and A Rock and Roll Alternative in 1976, Champagne Jam in 1978, and Underdog in 1979.

The band's next lineup change came when Nix left the band in 1979, "right after Underdog", due to creative differences. He was replaced by Roy Yeager, who had most recently toured with Lobo. Are You Ready!, a collection of live and studio recordings, was released shortly after Yeager's arrival, although Nix claimed he performed on some of the album's tracks. The Boys from Doraville and Quinella followed in 1980 and 1981. The band recorded a new album in 1982, however due to "creative differences" with CBS Records it was unreleased; shortly thereafter, Yeager was replaced by Danny Biget. The next January, Hammond also left to pursue a solo career. Justo subsequently returned on a part-time basis. At the end of 1983, founding member Goddard announced his departure from ARS.

=== 1984–2006 ===
In early 1984, ARS was joined by new vocalist Andy Anderson, bassist Tommy Stribling and drummer Keith Hamrick. Stribling was replaced by Steve Stone in early 1986. By the beginning of 1987, the group had been joined by new vocalist Shaun Williamson, a returning Stribling in place of J. R. Cobb, and new drummer Sean Burke. Around a year later, Ronnie Hammond returned, Brendan O'Brien replaced Stribling, and J.E. Garnett took over from Stone. By the end of 1988, Stone had returned on guitar. This lineup released Truth in a Structured Form in October 1989.

Justin Senker replaced Garnett in 1992, and the new lineup issued Atlanta Rhythm Section '96 in 1996. Ray "R.J." Vealey took over from Burke in 1995, who debuted on the 1997 album of re-recorded material Partly Plugged. This was followed two years later by Eufaula, the band's first album of new material in ten years. During the subsequent tour, Vealey died suddenly of a heart attack on November 13, 1999, which was later deemed to be as the result of "chronic cocaine abuse". He was replaced by Jim Keeling and the group returned to touring in early 2000. In early 2001, Andy Anderson returned when Hammond joined the Voices of Classic Rock touring group. The new lineup toured for five years but did not record, only releasing the 2005 live album Live at Stabler Arena.

=== Since 2006 ===
In early 2006, founding member Barry Bailey left Atlanta Rhythm Section, with Alan Accardi taking his place. The following year, Accardi was replaced by David Anderson. Andy Anderson was temporarily replaced for tour dates in the spring of 2008, after suffering a heart attack for which he required triple bypass surgery; a friend of his, Steve Croson, took over for a couple of shows, followed later by former members Rodney Justo and Shaun Williamson. In 2011, ARS released With All Due Respect which was dedicated to Ronnie Hammond, who died in March that year.

Shortly after the release of With All Due Respect, founding members Justo and Paul Goddard (both of whom made guest appearances on the album) rejoined the group for the first time since 1983. The band continued touring until April 2014, when Goddard died of cancer. Justin Senker returned to take his place later in the year. Rodger Stephan replaced Jim Keeling in 2016. At the beginning of 2020, Lee Shealy replaced the band's last constant member, Dean Daughtry, who retired in December 2019.

== Members ==
=== Current ===
Image	Name	Years active	Instruments	Release contributions
	Rodney Justo	1971–1972; 1983; 2008 (substitute); 2011–present	lead and backing vocals	Atlanta Rhythm Section (1972); With All Due Respect (2011) – one track only
	Steve "Clean" Stone	1986–1988; 1988–present	guitar (lead since 2006); bass (1986–88); backing vocals	all Atlanta Rhythm Section (ARS) releases since Truth in a Structured Form (1989) (except Live at the Savoy, New York)
	Justin Senker	1992–2011; 2014–present	bass	all ARS releases since Atlanta Rhythm Section '96 (1996) (except Live at the Savoy, New York)
	David Anderson	2007–present	rhythm and lead guitars; backing vocals	all ARS releases since Anthology: Greatest & Latest (2007)
	Rodger Stephan	2016–present	drums; percussion; backing vocals	none to date
	Lee Shealy	2020–present (touring substitute 2017–2019)	keyboards; backing vocals	none to date

=== Former ===
Image	Name	Years active	Instruments	Release contributions
	Dean Daughtry	1971–2019 (died 2023)	keyboards; backing vocals	all ARS releases
	Barry Bailey	1971–2006 (died 2022)	lead guitar	all ARS releases from Atlanta Rhythm Section (1972) to Live at Stabler Arena (2005)
	Paul Goddard	1971–1983; 2011–2014 (until his death)	bass	all ARS releases from Atlanta Rhythm Section (1972) to Quinella (1981); Live at the Savoy, New York (2000); With All Due Respect (2011) – one track only
	Robert Nix	1971–1979 (died 2012)	drums; percussion; backing vocals	all ARS releases from Atlanta Rhythm Section (1972) to Are You Ready! (1979) – uncredited on Are You Ready!
	James "J. R." Cobb	1972–1986 (died 2019)	rhythm and slide guitars; backing vocals	all ARS releases from Back Up Against the Wall (1973) to Quinella (1981); Live at the Savoy, New York (2000)
	Ronnie Hammond	1972–1983; 1988–2001 (died 2011)	lead and backing vocals; occasional piano, acoustic guitar and percussion	all ARS releases from Back Up Against the Wall (1973) to Live at the Savoy, New York (2000); With All Due Respect (2011) – one track only
	Roy Yeager	1979–1982	drums; percussion	Are You Ready! (1979); The Boys from Doraville (1980); Quinella (1981); Live at the Savoy, New York (2000)
	Danny Biget	1982–1983	drums; percussion	none
	Tommy Stribling	1984–1986; 1987–1988	bass (1984–86); rhythm guitar (1987–88)	none
	Keith Hamrick	1984–1986	drums; percussion	none
	Andy Anderson	1984–1985; 1985–1987; 1999 (substitute); 2000 (substitute); 2001–2011	lead and backing vocals	all ARS releases from Live at Stabler Arena (2005) to With All Due Respect (2011)
	Jeff Logan	1985	lead and backing vocals	none
	Sean Burke	1987–1995	drums; percussion	Truth in a Structured Form (1989); Atlanta Rhythm Section '96 (1996)
	Shaun Williamson	1987–1988; 2008 (substitute)	lead and backing vocals	none
	J. E. Garnett	1988–1992	bass	Truth in a Structured Form (1989)
	Brendan O'Brien	1988	rhythm guitar; backing vocals	Truth in a Structured Form (1989)
	"R. J." Vealey	1995–1999 (until his death)	drums; percussion	Partly Plugged (1997); Eufaula (1999)
	Jim Keeling	1999–2016	drums; percussion	all ARS releases from Live at Stabler Arena (2005) to With All Due Respect (2011)
	Alan Accardi	2006–2007	rhythm and lead guitars; backing vocals	Anthology: Greatest & Latest (2007) – two live tracks only
	Steve Croson	2008 (substitute only)	lead vocals	none

== Lineups ==
Period	Members	Releases
Summer 1971 – January 1972	Rodney Justo – lead vocals; Barry Bailey – guitar; Paul Goddard – bass; Dean Daughtry – keyboards, backing vocals; Robert Nix – drums, backing vocals	Atlanta Rhythm Section (1972)
January – summer 1972	Rodney Justo – lead vocals; Barry Bailey – lead guitar; J. R. Cobb – rhythm guitar, backing vocals; Paul Goddard – bass; Dean Daughtry – keyboards, backing vocals; Robert Nix – drums, backing vocals	none
Summer 1972 – summer 1979	Ronnie Hammond – lead vocals; Barry Bailey – lead guitar; J. R. Cobb – rhythm guitar, backing vocals; Paul Goddard – bass; Dean Daughtry – keyboards, backing vocals; Robert Nix – drums, backing vocals	Back Up Against the Wall (1973); Third Annual Pipe Dream (1974); Dog Days (1975); Red Tape (1976); A Rock and Roll Alternative (1976); Champagne Jam (1978); Underdog (1979)
Summer 1979 – summer 1982	Ronnie Hammond – lead vocals; Barry Bailey – lead guitar; J. R. Cobb – rhythm guitar, backing vocals; Paul Goddard – bass; Dean Daughtry – keyboards, backing vocals; Roy Yeager – drums, percussion	Are You Ready! (1979); The Boys from Doraville (1980); Quinella (1981); Live at the Savoy, New York (2000)
Summer 1982 – January 1983	Ronnie Hammond – lead vocals; Barry Bailey – lead guitar; J. R. Cobb – rhythm guitar, backing vocals; Paul Goddard – bass; Dean Daughtry – keyboards, backing vocals; Danny Biget – drums, percussion	none
January – December 1983	Rodney Justo – lead vocals; Barry Bailey – lead guitar; J. R. Cobb – rhythm guitar, backing vocals; Paul Goddard – bass; Dean Daughtry – keyboards, backing vocals; Danny Biget – drums, percussion	none
Early 1984 – 1985	Andy Anderson – lead vocals; Barry Bailey – lead guitar; J. R. Cobb – rhythm guitar, backing vocals; Tommy Stribling – bass; Dean Daughtry – keyboards, backing vocals; Keith Hamrick – drums, percussion	none
1985	Jeff Logan – lead vocals; Barry Bailey – lead guitar; J. R. Cobb – rhythm guitar, backing vocals; Tommy Stribling – bass; Dean Daughtry – keyboards, backing vocals; Keith Hamrick – drums, percussion	none
1985 – early 1986	Andy Anderson – lead vocals; Barry Bailey – lead guitar; J. R. Cobb – rhythm guitar, backing vocals; Tommy Stribling – bass; Dean Daughtry – keyboards, backing vocals; Keith Hamrick – drums, percussion	none
Early – late 1986	Andy Anderson – lead vocals; Barry Bailey – lead guitar; J. R. Cobb – rhythm guitar, backing vocals; Steve Stone – bass, backing vocals; Dean Daughtry – keyboards, backing vocals; Keith Hamrick – drums, percussion	none
Early 1987 – early 1988	Shaun Williamson – lead vocals; Barry Bailey – lead guitar; Tommy Stribling – rhythm guitar; Steve Stone – bass, backing vocals; Dean Daughtry – keyboards, backing vocals; Sean Burke – drums, percussion	none
Early – late 1988	Ronnie Hammond – lead vocals; Barry Bailey – lead guitar; Brendan O'Brien – guitar, backing vocals; J.E. Garnett – bass; Dean Daughtry – keyboards, backing vocals; Sean Burke – drums, percussion	none
Late 1988 – 1992	Ronnie Hammond – lead vocals; Barry Bailey – lead guitar; Steve Stone – guitar, backing vocals; J.E. Garnett – bass; Dean Daughtry – keyboards, backing vocals; Sean Burke – drums, percussion	Truth in a Structured Form (1989)
1992–1995	Ronnie Hammond – lead vocals; Barry Bailey – lead guitar; Steve Stone – guitar, backing vocals; Justin Senker – bass; Dean Daughtry – keyboards, backing vocals; Sean Burke – drums, percussion	Atlanta Rhythm Section '96 (1996)
1995 – November 1999	Ronnie Hammond – lead vocals; Barry Bailey – lead guitar; Steve Stone – guitar, backing vocals; Justin Senker – bass; Dean Daughtry – keyboards, backing vocals; R.J. Vealey – drums, percussion	Partly Plugged (1997); Eufaula (1999)
November 1999 – early 2001	Ronnie Hammond – lead vocals; Barry Bailey – lead guitar; Steve Stone – guitar, backing vocals; Justin Senker – bass; Dean Daughtry – keyboards, backing vocals; Jim Keeling – drums, percussion	none
Early 2001 – early 2006	Andy Anderson – lead vocals; Barry Bailey – lead guitar; Steve Stone – guitar, backing vocals; Justin Senker – bass; Dean Daughtry – keyboards, backing vocals; Jim Keeling – drums, percussion	Live at Stabler Arena (2005)
Early 2006 – spring 2007	Andy Anderson – lead vocals; Steve Stone – lead guitar, backing vocals; Alan Accardi – guitar, backing vocals; Justin Senker – bass; Dean Daughtry – keyboards, backing vocals; Jim Keeling – drums, percussion	Anthology: Latest & Greatest (2007) – two live tracks only
Spring 2007 – summer 2011	Andy Anderson – lead vocals; Steve Stone – lead guitar, backing vocals; David Anderson – guitar, backing vocals; Justin Senker – bass; Dean Daughtry – keyboards, backing vocals; Jim Keeling – drums, percussion	Champagne Jam Live (2007); Hot Southern Nights (2007); With All Due Respect (2011)
Summer 2011 – April 2014	Rodney Justo – lead vocals; Steve Stone – lead guitar, backing vocals; David Anderson – guitar, backing vocals; Paul Goddard – bass; Dean Daughtry – keyboards, backing vocals; Jim Keeling – drums, percussion	none
Summer 2014 – early 2016	Rodney Justo – lead vocals; Steve Stone – lead guitar, backing vocals; David Anderson – guitar, backing vocals; Justin Senker – bass; Dean Daughtry – keyboards, backing vocals; Jim Keeling – drums, percussion	none
Early 2016 – December 2019	Rodney Justo – lead vocals; Steve Stone – lead guitar, backing vocals; David Anderson – guitar, backing vocals; Justin Senker – bass; Dean Daughtry – keyboards, backing vocals; Rodger Stephan – drums, percussion	none
January 2020 – present	Rodney Justo – lead vocals; Steve Stone – lead guitar, harmonica, backing vocals; David Anderson – guitar, backing vocals; Justin Senker – bass; Lee Shealy – keyboards, backing vocals; Rodger Stephan – drums	none
