= Atlanta Rhythm Section discography =

- Studio albums: 13
- Live albums: 3
- Compilation albums: 7
- Singles: 15
- Video albums: 2

Atlanta Rhythm Section discography consists of 13 studio albums, six compilation albums, two live albums, and 15 singles.

== Albums ==
=== Studio albums ===
List of albums, with selected chart positions
| Title | Album details | Peak chart positions | | | Sales | Certifications |
| Title | Album details | US | AUS | RPM Can | Sales | Certifications |
|---|---|---|---|---|---|---|
| Atlanta Rhythm Section | Released: January 1972; Label: Decca (75265); Format: CD, cassette, LP | 210 | — | — | — | — |
| Back Up Against the Wall | Released: February 1973; Label: Decca (75390); Format: CD, CS, LP | — | — | — | — | — |
| Third Annual Pipe Dream | Released: August 1974; Label: Polydor (6027); Format: CD, CS, LP | 74 | — | 77 | — | — |
| Dog Days | Released: August 1975; Label: Polydor (6041); Format: CD, CS, LP | 113 | — | — | — | — |
| Red Tape | Released: April 1976; Label: Polydor (6060); Format: CD, CS, LP | 146 | — | — | — | — |
| A Rock and Roll Alternative | Released: December 1976; Label: Polydor (6080); Format: CD, CS, LP | 11 | 26 | 22 | US: 500,000; CAN: 50,000 | RIAA: Gold; CAN: Gold |
| Champagne Jam | Released: January 1978; Label: Polydor (6134); Format: CD, CS, LP | 7 | 46 | 16 | US: 1 million; CAN: 50,000 | RIAA: Platinum; CAN: Gold |
| Underdog | Released: June 1979; Label: Polydor (6200); Format: CD, CS, LP | 26 | 34 | 47 | US: 500,000 | RIAA: Gold |
| The Boys from Doraville | Released: August 1980; Label: Polydor (6285); Format: CD, CS, LP | 65 | — | — | — | — |
| Quinella | Released: August 1981; Label: Columbia (CK-37550); Format: CD, CS, LP | 70 | — | 46 | — | — |
| Sleep With One Eye Open | Released: Scheduled for 1983; Label: Columbia (CK-37566); Format: Not released | — | — | — | — | Note: Finally released in 2010 on the German label, Centaurus (CR-710) |
| Truth in a Structured Form | Released: October 1989; Label: Imagine Records (ZK-45465); Format: CD | — | — | — | — | — |
| Partly Plugged | Released: January 1997; Label: River North Records (514161345); Southern Tracks (0079); Format: CD, CS | — | — | — | — | — |
| Eufaula | Released: February 1999; Label: Intersound (9553); Format: CD | — | — | — | — | — |
| With All Due Respect | Released: May 23, 2011; Label: Fuel 2000 Records (302 061 881); Format: CD | — | — | — | — | — |
"—" denotes a recording that did not chart or was not released in that territory.

=== Live albums ===
List of albums, with selected chart positions
| Title | Album details | Peak chart positions | |
| Title | Album details | US | RPM Can |
|---|---|---|---|
| Are You Ready! | Released: October 1979; Label: Polydor (6236); Format: CD (Import Only), CS, LP | 51 | 86 |
| Live at The Savoy, New York October 27, 1981 | Released: July 2000; Label: Phoenix Gems (UK) (5001); Format: CD | — | — |
| Extended Versions | Released: 2011; Label: Sony Music (886978087225); Format: CD | — | — |
"—" denotes a recording that did not chart or was not released in that territory.

=== Compilation albums ===
List of albums, with selected chart positions
| Title | Album details |
|---|---|
| Atlanta Rhythm Section [MCA Records]: (reissue of the first and second Decca albums in a 2-LP set) | Released: April 1977; Label: MCA (4114); Format: LP |
| The Best of Atlanta Rhythm Section [Polydor Records] | Released: June 11, 1991; Label: Polydor (849375); Format: CD, cassette |
| Atlanta Rhythm Section '96 (re-recordings): (also released as The Very Best of Atlanta Rhythm Section in 2001 on Purple Pyramid/Cleopatra Records) | Released: April 2, 1996; Label: CMC International (8303); Format: CD, CS |
| The Best of Atlanta Rhythm Section [Polygram Special Markets] | Released: 1997; Label: Polygram (520382); 2004 reissue: Collectables (8409); Format: CD, CS |
| 20th Century Masters – The Millennium Collection: The Best of Atlanta Rhythm Section | Released: November 21, 2000; Label: Universal (549206); Format: CD |
| Anthology: Greatest & Latest | Released: May 15, 2007; Label: Purple Pyramid/Cleopatra (1820); Format: CD |
| From the Vaults [2-CD set]: (also released as Time Machine in 2023 on Sunset Blvd Records) | Released: May 29, 2012; Label: Fuel 2000 Records (302 061 914); Format: CD |

== Singles ==
List of singles, with selected chart positions
| Title | Year | Peak chart positions | | | | | | | | Album |
| Title | Year | US | US Main | US AC | US Country | US R&B | CAN RPM | AUS | UK | Album |
|---|---|---|---|---|---|---|---|---|---|---|
| "Doraville" | 1974 | 35 | — | — | — | — | 67 | — | — | Third Annual Pipe Dream |
| "Angel (What In The World's Come Over Us)" | 1975 | 79 | — | — | — | — | — | — | — | Third Annual Pipe Dream |
| "Free Spirit" | 1976 | 85 | — | — | — | — | — | — | — | Red Tape |
| "Jukin'" | 1976 | 82 | — | — | — | — | — | — | — | Red Tape |
| "Dog Days" | 1977 | 64 | — | — | — | — | 49 | — | — | Dog Days |
| "Georgia Rhythm" | 1977 | 68 | — | — | — | — | — | — | — | A Rock and Roll Alternative |
| "Neon Nites" | 1977 | 42 | — | — | — | — | — | — | — | A Rock and Roll Alternative |
| "So in to You" | 1977 | 7 | — | 11 | — | 93 | 2 | 27 | — | A Rock and Roll Alternative |
| "Champagne Jam" | 1978 | 43 | — | — | — | — | — | — | — | Champagne Jam |
| "I'm Not Gonna Let It Bother Me Tonight" | 1978 | 14 | — | — | — | — | 15 | — | — | Champagne Jam |
| "Imaginary Lover" | 1978 | 7 | — | 20 | — | — | 9 | 49 | — | Champagne Jam |
| "Do It or Die" | 1979 | 19 | — | 11 | 92 | — | 43 | 75 | — | Underdog |
| "Spooky" | 1979 | 17 | — | 23 | — | — | 37 | 96 | 48 | Underdog |
| "Back Up Against the Wall" (live) | 1979 | 103 | — | — | — | — | — | — | — | Are You Ready! |
| "I Ain't Much" | 1980 | 101 | — | — | — | — | — | — | — | The Boys from Doraville |
| "Silver Eagle" | 1980 | 101 | — | — | 75 | — | — | — | — | The Boys from Doraville |
| "Alien" | 1981 | 29 | 18 | 16 | — | — | — | — | — | Quinella |
"—" denotes a recording that did not chart or was not released in that territory.

== Video ==
- Live at Stabler Arena (2005)
- Champagne Jam Live (2007)
