= 20th Century Masters – The Millennium Collection: The Best of Atlanta Rhythm Section =

Compilation album by Atlanta Rhythm Section
- Released: 21 November 2000
- Recorded: 1974–1981
- Genre: Southern rock
- Length: 50:36
- Labels: A&M, Universal
- Producer: Buddy Buie

Atlanta Rhythm Section chronology
Live at the Savoy, New York October 27, 1981 (2000)	20th Century Masters – The Millennium Collection: The Best of Atlanta Rhythm Section (2000)

Professional ratings
Review scores
Source	Rating
AllMusic	4/5 stars

20th Century Masters – The Millennium Collection: The Best of Atlanta Rhythm Section is a greatest hits album by the band Atlanta Rhythm Section released through Universal Music Group. The collection spans the band's history from 1974 through 1981.

== Track listing ==
No.	Title	Writer(s)	Length
1.	"Doraville"	Bailey, Buie, Nix	3:15
2.	"So Into You"	Buie, Daughtry, Nix	4:21
3.	"Champagne Jam"	Buie, Cobb, Nix	4:32
4.	"Crazy"	Buie, Daughtry, Nix	3:12
5.	"Imaginary Lover"	Buie, Daughtry, Nix	5:05
6.	"Angel (What in the World's Come Over Us)"	Bailey, Buie, Nix	5:10
7.	"Do It or Die"	Buie, Cobb, Hammond	3:28
8.	"Spooky"	Buie, Cobb, Middlebrooks, Shapiro	4:58
9.	"Neon Nites"	Buie, Nix	3:58
10.	"Dog Days"	Buie, Daughtry, Nix	3:37
11.	"I'm Not Gonna Let It Bother Me Tonight"	Buie, Daughtry, Nix	4:07
12.	"Georgia Rhythm"	Buie, Cobb, Nix	4:53

All original recordings (24-bit mastered)

== Personnel ==
- Ronnie Hammond – lead vocals, backing vocals
- Barry Bailey – lead guitar
- J.R. Cobb – rhythm guitar, backing vocals
- Dean Daughtry – keyboards
- Paul Goddard – bass guitar
- Robert Nix – drums, percussion, backing vocals
- Buddy Buie – backing vocals
