= Underdog (Atlanta Rhythm Section album) =

Studio album by Atlanta Rhythm Section
- Released: June 1979
- Genre: Soft rock
- Length: 41:14
- Label: Polydor
- Producer: Buddy Buie

Atlanta Rhythm Section chronology
Champagne Jam (1978)	Underdog (1979)	The Boys from Doraville (1980)

Singles from Underdog
- 1. "Do It or Die" Released: August 1979; 2. "Spooky" Released: August 1979

Professional ratings
Review scores
Source	Rating
Music Week	3/4 stars

Underdog is an album by the Atlanta Rhythm Section, released in 1979 by Polydor Records. It is their last album with drummer Robert Nix who left the band near the end of 1979.

The album reached number 26 on the U.S. Billboard 200 albums chart, and was certified gold by the RIAA in June 1979. The album contained two songs which reached the top 20 of the Billboard Hot 100 singles chart, "Do It or Die" and "Spooky". The latter was a re-recording of the 1968 number three hit for Classics IV, a pop rock group whose line up included members who later joined Atlanta Rhythm Section.

== Track listing ==
Side A
No.	Title	Writer(s)	Length
1.	"Do It or Die"	Buie, Cobb, Hammond	3:28
2.	"Born Ready"	Buie, Daughtry, Nix	3:53
3.	"I Hate the Blues" / "Let's Go Get Stoned"	Buie, Daughtry, Nix; Nickolas Ashford, Valerie Simpson	7:10
4.	"Indigo Passion"	Buie, Cobb	3:55

Side B
No.	Title	Writer(s)	Length
5.	"While Time is Left"	Bailey, Buie, Daughtry, Nix	5:20
6.	"It's Only Music"	Buie, Cobb	5:32
7.	"Spooky"	Buie, Cobb, Middlebrooks, Shapiro	4:58
8.	"My Song"	Buie, Hammond	3:15

== Personnel ==
Atlanta Rhythm Section

- Ronnie Hammond - vocals
- Barry Bailey - acoustic and electric guitar
- J.R. Cobb - guitar, percussion, backing vocals
- Dean Daughtry - keyboards
- Paul Goddard - bass guitar
- Robert Nix - drums

Additional player

- James Stroud - percussion

== Charts ==
Chart (1979)	Peak position
Australian Albums (Kent Music Report)	34
Canada Top Albums/CDs (RPM)	47
US Billboard 200	26

== Certifications ==
Region	Certification	Certified units/sales
United States (RIAA)	Gold	500,000^{^}
^{^} Shipments figures based on certification alone.
