= Red Tape (album) =

Studio album by Atlanta Rhythm Section
- Released: April 1976
- Recorded: Studio One, Doraville, Georgia
- Genre: Southern rock
- Length: 31:55
- Label: Polydor
- Producer: Buddy Buie

Atlanta Rhythm Section chronology
| Dog Days (1975) | Red Tape (1976) | A Rock and Roll Alternative (1976) |

Professional ratings
Review scores
| Source | Rating |
|---|---|
| Allmusic | 4/5 stars |

Red Tape is an album by the American Southern rock band Atlanta Rhythm Section, released in 1976.

== Track listing ==
1. "Jukin'" (Buie, Nix, Wills) – 3:43
2. "Mixed Emotions" (Buie, Cobb, Nix) – 3:20
3. "Shanghied" (Buie, Cobb, Nix) – 2:14
4. "Police! Police!" (Buie, Cobb, Nix) – 3:11
5. "Beautiful Dreamers" (Buie, Cobb, Nix) – 3:26
6. "Oh What a Feeling" (Bailey, Buie, Nix) – 2:39
7. "Free Spirit" (Buie, Hammond, Nix) – 3:35
8. "Another Man's Woman" (Bailey, Buie, Daughtry, Nix) – 9:47

== Personnel ==
Atlanta Rhythm Section

- Ronnie Hammond - vocals, backing vocals
- Barry Bailey - guitar
- J.R. Cobb - guitar, backing vocals
- Dean Daughtry - keyboards
- Paul Goddard - bass guitar
- Robert Nix - percussion, drums, backing vocals

Additional player

- Buddy Buie - vocals

== Production ==
- Producer: Buddy Buie
- Engineer: Rodney Mills

== Charts ==
| Chart (1976) | Peak position |
|---|---|
| US Billboard 200 | 146 |
