= Atlanta Rhythm Section (album) =

Studio album by Atlanta Rhythm Section
- Released: January 1972
- Recorded: Studio One, Doraville, Georgia
- Genre: Southern rock
- Label: Decca
- Producer: Buddy Buie

Atlanta Rhythm Section chronology
Atlanta Rhythm Section (1972)	Back Up Against the Wall (1973)

Atlanta Rhythm Section is the debut album by the American Southern rock band Atlanta Rhythm Section, released in January 1972. It was released on the Decca label, DL-75265. It was produced by Buddy Buie, and is currently the group's only album to feature original lead vocalist Rodney Justo.

The album was re-released in 1977 as a double album with Back Up Against the Wall, by the MCA label, MCA-24114.

== Track listing ==
No.	Title	Writer(s)	Length
1.	"Love Me Just A Little (Sometime)"	Nix, Daughtry, Buie	6:05
2.	"Baby No Lie"	Nix, Daughtry, Buie, Bailey	3:51
3.	"All In Your Mind"	Buie, Cobb	3:16
4.	"Earnestine"	Nix, Daughtry, Bailey, Goddard	2:33
5.	"Forty Days And Forty Nights"	Randall Bramblett, Davis Causey, Bob Jones	4:21
6.	"Another Man's Woman (It's So Hard)"	Nix, Daughtry, Buie	4:46
7.	"Days Of Our Lives"	Buie, Bailey, Cobb	3:12
8.	"Yours And Mine"	Nix, Buie	2:39
9.	"Can't Stand It No More"	Buie, Cobb, Justo	4:02
10.	"One More Problem"	Nix, Daughtry, Buie, Bailey	3:08

== Personnel ==
Atlanta Rhythm Section

- Rodney Justo - vocals
- Barry Bailey - acoustic and electric guitars
- Dean Daughtry - keyboards
- Paul Goddard - bass
- Robert Nix - drums, percussion

== Production ==
- Arranged by the Atlanta Rhythm Section
- Produced by Buddy Buie (for BBC Productions)
- Recording and Mix Engineered by Rodney Mills
- All songs published by Low-Sal, Inc.
