= Back Up Against the Wall =

Back Up Against The Wall

Studio album by Atlanta Rhythm Section
- Released: February 1973
- Recorded: Studio One, Doraville, Georgia
- Genre: Southern rock
- Length: 36:31
- Label: Decca Records
- Producer: Buddy Buie

Atlanta Rhythm Section chronology
Atlanta Rhythm Section (1972)	Back Up Against The Wall (1973)	Third Annual Pipe Dream (1974)

Professional ratings
Review scores
Source	Rating
Allmusic	link
Christgau's Record Guide	C+
Encyclopedia of Popular Music	3/5 stars

Back Up Against the Wall is the second album by the Southern rock band Atlanta Rhythm Section, released in 1973. It is the first album to feature Ronnie Hammond on lead vocals and J. R. Cobb as secondary guitarist (Cobb had also written a few songs for the band's previous album before he became a member). The album was re-released in 1977 on MCA Records as a double, paired with their debut (MCA-24114).

== Track listing ==
No.	Title	Writer(s)	Length
1.	"Wrong"	Buie, Cobb	2:44
2.	"Cold Turkey, Tenn."	Nix	3:18
3.	"Will I Live On?"	Daughtry, Nix	2:52
4.	"A Livin' Lovin' Wreck"	Otis Blackwell	3:08
5.	"Superman"	Randall Bramblett	3:26
6.	"What You Gonna Do About It?"	Buie, Hammond	3:00
7.	"Conversation"	Buie, Cobb	3:29
8.	"Redneck"	Joe South	3:50
9.	"Make Me Believe It"	Buie, Hammond, Nix	3:14
10.	"Back Up Against the Wall"	Buie, Cobb	3:23
11.	"It Must Be Love"	Cobb, Daughtry, Nix	4:07

== Personnel ==
Atlanta Rhythm Section

- Ronnie Hammond - vocals, piano
- Barry Bailey - acoustic and electric guitar
- J.R. Cobb - acoustic, electric, steel and slide guitars, vocals
- Dean Daughtry - acoustic and electric piano, organ
- Paul Goddard - bass
- Robert Nix - drums, vocals

Additional players

- Randall Bramblett - piano
- Al Kooper - synthesizers (including ARP)
- Billy Lee Riley - harmonica

== Production ==
- Producer: Buddy Buie
- Engineers: Bobby Langford, Rodney Mills
- Mixing: Rodney Mills
- Arranger: Buddy Buie
- Cover design: Mike McCarty
- Illustrations: Mike McCarty
