= Dog Days (Atlanta Rhythm Section album) =

Studio album by Atlanta Rhythm Section
- Released: August 1975
- Recorded: 1975,
- Studios: Studio One, Doraville, Georgia
- Genre: Southern rock
- Length: 36:44
- Label: Polydor
- Producer: Buddy Buie

Atlanta Rhythm Section chronology
Third Annual Pipe Dream (1974)	Dog Days (1975)	Red Tape (1976)

Professional ratings
Review scores
Source	Rating
Allmusic	link

Dog Days is an album by the Southern rock band Atlanta Rhythm Section, released in 1975. The title single reached #49 on the Canadian pop charts and #43 on the AC charts.

== Track listing ==
1. "Crazy" (Buie, Nix, Daughtry) – 3:07
2. "Boogie Smoogie" (Buie, Nix, Bailey) – 7:57
3. "Cuban Crisis" (Buie, Nix, Cobb) – 3:50
4. "It Just Ain't Your Moon" (Buie, Nix, Daughtry) – 4:50
5. "Dog Days" (Buie, Nix, Daughtry) – 3:35
6. "Bless My Soul" (instrumental) (Cobb) – 4:00
7. "Silent Treatment" (Buie, Nix, Bailey) – 5:15
8. "All Night Rain" (Buie, Nix, Daughtry, Bob McRee) – 3:10

== Personnel ==
Atlanta Rhythm Section

- Ronnie Hammond - vocals, background vocals
- Barry Bailey - guitar
- J.R. Cobb - guitar, background vocals
- Dean Daughtry - keyboards
- Paul Goddard - bass guitar
- Robert Nix - percussion, drums, background vocals

Additional player

- Buddy Buie - vocals

== Production ==
- Producer: Buddy Buie
- Engineer: Rodney Mills

== Charts ==
Chart (1975)	Peak position
US Billboard 200	113
