= Quinella (album) =

Studio album by Atlanta Rhythm Section
- Released: August 1981
- Venue: Studio One
- Genre: Southern rock
- Label: Columbia
- Producer: Buddy Buie

Atlanta Rhythm Section chronology
The Boys from Doraville (1980)	Quinella (1981)	Truth in a Structured Form (1989)

Singles from Quinella
- 1. "Alien" Released: 1981

Quinella is the tenth album by American Southern rock band Atlanta Rhythm Section, and their only album on Columbia Records, released in August 1981. The band was supposed to release another album on the label, but due to differences between Columbia and the band, the album was shelved.

The album peaked at #70 on the Billboard 200. Its only single, "Alien", peaked at #29 on the Billboard Hot 100, becoming their final Top 40 hit.

== Critical reception ==
Professional ratings
Review scores
Source	Rating
AllMusic	4.5/5 stars

The Boston Globe wrote: "As always, there is an abundance of sinewy, unabrasive guitars, smooth backup harmonies, and a soft punctuating bottom, all in a conservative tempo. But the style is so hygienic the album is difficult to get excited about."

== Track listing ==
Side A
No.	Title	Writer(s)	Length
1.	"Homesick"	Buie, Cobb	4:16
2.	"Quinella"	Buie, Cobb	5:28
3.	"Alien"	Buie, Lewis, McRay	4:55
4.	"Higher"	Buie, Hammond	4:12

Side B
No.	Title	Writer(s)	Length
5.	"You're So Strong"	Buie, Daughtry	5:02
6.	"Outlaw Music"	Buie, Cobb	5:03
7.	"Pretty Girl"	Buie, Hammond	3:31
8.	"Southern Exposure"	Buie, Cobb	2:53
9.	"Going to Shangri-La"	Buie, Daughtry	3:44

== Personnel ==
=== Atlanta Rhythm Section ===
- Ronnie Hammond - vocals, acoustic guitar, percussion, backing vocals
- Barry Bailey - guitar
- J.R. Cobb - guitar
- Dean Daughtry - keyboards
- Paul Goddard - bass guitar
- Roy Yeager - percussion, drums

=== Additional musicians ===
- Buddy Buie - backing vocals
- Steve McRay - piano and backing vocals on "Alien"
- Mark Denning - synthesizer

== Production ==
- Producer: Buddy Buie
- Associate producer: Rodney Mills
- Engineers: Rodney Mills, Greg Quesnel
- Associate engineer: Greg Quesnel
- Mastering: Bob Ludwig
- Art direction: Mike McCarty
- Design: Mike McCarty

== Charts ==
Chart (1981)	Peak position
Canada Top Albums/CDs (RPM)	46
US Billboard 200	70
US Top Rock Albums (Billboard)	11
