= A Rock and Roll Alternative =

Studio album by Atlanta Rhythm Section
- Released: December 1976
- Studios: Studio One, Doraville, Georgia, U.S.
- Genre: Southern rock
- Length: 34:34
- Label: Polydor
- Producer: Buddy Buie

Atlanta Rhythm Section chronology
Red Tape (1976)	A Rock and Roll Alternative (1976)	Champagne Jam (1978)

Singles from A Rock and Roll Alternative
- 1. "Georgia Rhythm" Released: 1977; 2. "Neon Nites" Released: 1977; 3. "So in to You" Released: 1977

Professional ratings
Review scores
Source	Rating
AllMusic	4.5/5 stars
Christgau's Record Guide	C+
The Rolling Stone Record Guide	5/5 stars

A Rock and Roll Alternative is an album by the Southern rock band Atlanta Rhythm Section, released in 1976. This album includes the band's biggest hit, "So in to You", which peaked at number 7 on the Billboard Hot 100 and number 11 on the Easy Listening chart.

== Track listing ==
1. "Sky High" (Buie, Daughtry, Hammond, Nix) – 5:17
2. "Hitch-Hikers' Hero" (Buie, Nix) – 3:38
3. "Don't Miss the Message" (Buie, Cobb, Nix) – 3:27
4. "Georgia Rhythm" (Buie, Cobb, Nix) – 4:52
5. "So in to You" (Buie, Daughtry, Nix) – 4:20
6. "Outside Woman Blues" (Blind Joe Reynolds) – 4:53
7. "Everybody Gotta Go" (Buie, Daughtry, Nix) – 4:10
8. "Neon Nites" (Buie, Nix) – 3:57

== Personnel ==
- Ronnie Hammond – vocals, background vocals
- Barry Bailey – guitar
- J.R. Cobb – guitar, background vocals
- Dean Daughtry – keyboards
- Paul Goddard – bass guitar
- Robert Nix – percussion, drums, vocals, background vocals

== Production ==
- Producer: Buddy Buie
- Associate producers: J.R. Cobb, Robert Nix
- Engineer: Rodney Mills
- Mixing: Rodney Mills
- Remixing: Suha Gur
- Design: Mike McCarty
- Art direction: Buddy Buie, Mike McCarty
- Photography: Jim Wiggins

== Charts ==
Chart (1976-77)	Peak position
Australian Albums (Kent Music Report)	26
Canada Top Albums/CDs (RPM)	22
US Billboard 200	11

== Certifications ==
Region	Certification	Certified units/sales
Canada (Music Canada)	Gold	50,000^{^}
United States (RIAA)	Gold	500,000^{^}
^{^} Shipments figures based on certification alone.
