= Third Annual Pipe Dream =

Studio album by Atlanta Rhythm Section
- Released: August 1974
- Recorded: Studio One, Doraville, Georgia
- Genres: Southern rock, soft rock
- Label: Polydor
- Producer: Buddy Buie

Atlanta Rhythm Section chronology
Back Up Against the Wall (1973)	Third Annual Pipe Dream (1974)	Dog Days (1975)

Singles from Third Annual Pipe Dream
- 1. "Doraville" Released: 1974; 2. "Angel (What in the World's Come over Us)" Released: 1975

Professional ratings
Review scores
Source	Rating
Allmusic	link

Third Annual Pipe Dream is the third album by the Southern rock band Atlanta Rhythm Section, released in 1974. The band scored their first Top 40 hit with "Doraville", peaking at #35.

== Track listing ==
No.	Title	Writer(s)	Length
1.	"Doraville"	Buie, Nix, Bailey	3:28
2.	"Jesus Hearted People"	Buie, Nix, Bailey	3:48
3.	"Close the Door"	Hammond, Goddard	3:22
4.	"Blues in Maude's Flat (instrumental)"	Grant Green	3:47
5.	"Join the Race"	John Fristoe	3:57
6.	"Angel (What in the World's Come Over Us)"	Buie, Nix, Bailey	5:10
7.	"Get Your Head Out of Your Heart"	Nix, Hammond	2:28
8.	"The War Is Over"	Cobb, Bailey	2:00
9.	"Help Yourself"	Buie, Cobb, Nix	2:54
10.	"Who You Gonna Run To"	Buie, Cobb, Nix	3:18

== Personnel ==
Atlanta Rhythm Section

- Ronnie Hammond - vocals, backing vocals
- Barry Bailey - guitar
- J.R. Cobb - guitar, backing vocals
- Dean Daughtry - keyboards
- Paul Goddard - bass
- Robert Nix - percussion, drums, backing vocals

Additional players

- Mylon LeFevre - vocals (track 2)
- Hugh Jarrett - vocals (track 2)
- Michael Huey - conductor

== Production ==
- Producer: Buddy Buie
- Engineer: Rodney Mills

== Charts ==
Chart (1974)	Peak position
Canada Top Albums/CDs (RPM)	77
US Billboard 200	74
