= The Boys from Doraville =

Studio album by Atlanta Rhythm Section
- Released: August 1980
- Genre: Rock
- Label: Polydor
- Producer: Buddy Buie

Atlanta Rhythm Section chronology
Underdog (1979)	The Boys from Doraville (1980)	Quinella (1981)

Singles from The Boys from Doraville
- 1. "I Ain't Much" Released: 1980; 2. "Silver Eagle" Released: 1980

The Boys from Doraville is the ninth album by the Southern rock band Atlanta Rhythm Section, and their final album on Polydor Records, released in 1980.

The album peaked at #65 on the Billboard 200. None of its singles charted. As a result, the group departed Polydor, which led to a breach of contract lawsuit from the company that was later settled in the band's favor.

It is the first album to be released without the band's core lineup of Ronnie Hammond (vocals), J. R. Cobb (guitar), Barry Bailey (guitar), Paul Goddard (bass), Dean Daughtry (keys) and Robert Nix (drums).

== Track listing ==
Side A
No.	Title	Writer(s)	Length
1.	"Cocaine Charlie"	Buie, Hammond	4:53
2.	"Next Year's Rock & Roll"	Buie, Daughtry	5:20
3.	"I Ain't Much"	Buie, Cobb	4:23
4.	"Putting My Faith in Love"	Buie, Cobb, Daughtry	5:10

Side B
No.	Title	Writer(s)	Length
5.	"Rough at the Edges"	Buie, Daughtry	3:16
6.	"Silver Eagle"	Buie, Cobb	3:51
7.	"Pedestal"	Buie, Hammond	2:49
8.	"Try My Love"	Buie, Hammond	4:04
9.	"Strictly R & R"	Buie, Daughtry, Nix, Walker	4:41

== Personnel ==
Atlanta Rhythm Section

- Ronnie Hammond – vocals, backing vocals
- Barry Bailey – guitar
- J.R. Cobb – guitar, backing vocals
- Dean Daughtry – keyboards
- Paul Goddard – bass
- Roy Yeager – drums, percussion

Additional player

- "Stray" Straton – backing vocals

== Charts ==
Chart (1980)	Peak position
US Billboard 200	65
