= Eufaula (album) =

Studio album by Atlanta Rhythm Section
- Released: February 23, 1999
- Genre: Southern rock
- Length: 44:58
- Label: Intersound
- Producers: Buddy Buie, Rodney Mills

Atlanta Rhythm Section chronology
Partly Plugged (1997)	Eufaula (1999)	Live at the Savoy, New York October 27, 1981 (2000)

Professional ratings
Review scores
Source	Rating
AllMusic	2.5/5 stars

Eufaula is an album by Southern rock band Atlanta Rhythm Section, released in 1999.

== Track listing ==
1. "I'm Not the Only One" (Buie, Hammond) – 5:13
2. "Who You Gonna Run To" (Buie, Cobb, Nix) – 3:26
3. "Dreamy Alabama" (Buie, Cobb, Hammond) – 4:35
4. "Nothing's as Bad as It Seems" (Buie, Cobb, Hammond) – 3:22
5. "When" (Buie, Daughtry) – 4:39
6. "You Ain't Seen Nothing Yet" (Buie, Cobb, McKibben) – 4:21
7. "Fine Day (The Day You Come Back to Me)" (Buie, Cobb, Hammond) – 4:46
8. "What Happened to Us" (Buie, Hammond) – 3:49
9. "Unique" (Buie, Cobb, Hammond) – 3:29
10. "How Can You Do This?" (Buie, Cobb, Hammond) – 4:11
11. "What's Up Wid Dat?" (Buie, Daughtry, Hammond, Stone) – 3:07

== Personnel ==
- Ronnie Hammond - vocals, background vocals
- Barry Bailey - guitar
- Dean Daughtry - keyboards
- Steve Stone - guitar
- Justin Senker - bass
- R.J. Vealey - drums, percussion
- Robert White Johnson - background vocals
- Steve Nathan - strings, Hammond organ

== Production ==
- Producers: Buddy Buie, Rodney Mills
- Engineer: Rodney Mills
- Assistant engineers: John Nielsen, Jason Stokes
- Mastering: Rodney Mills
- Design: Scott Larsen
- Photography: Buddy Buie, Rick Diamond, Terry Spackman, Tony Darrigan
