= Champagne Jam =

Studio album by Atlanta Rhythm Section
- Released: January 1978
- Studios: Studio One, Doraville, Georgia
- Genres: Blues rock, boogie rock
- Length: 33:15
- Label: Polydor
- Producer: Buddy Buie

Atlanta Rhythm Section chronology
A Rock and Roll Alternative (1976)	Champagne Jam (1978)	Underdog (1979)

Champagne Jam is an album by the American band Atlanta Rhythm Section, released in 1978. The single "Imaginary Lover" was the band's second Top 10 hit, peaking at #7 in the U.S. and #9 in Canada. The album itself was the band's most commercially successful, peaking at number 7 on the Billboard 200.

== Critical reception ==
Professional ratings
Review scores
Source	Rating
AllMusic	3/5 stars
The Village Voice	C

The Globe and Mail wrote: "The last of the first generation of Dixie boogie bands, the Atlanta Rhythm Section continues on its predictable but still enjoyable path, bringing with Champagne Jam a few fresh insights into the state of the blues-rock-boogie fusion."

== Track listing ==
All songs written by Buddy Buie and Robert Nix, additional writers where noted.

1. "Large Time" (Bailey) – 2:55
2. "I'm Not Gonna Let It Bother Me Tonight" (Daughtry) – 4:06
3. "Normal Love" (Cobb, Daughtry) – 3:22
4. "Champagne Jam" (Cobb) – 4:31
5. "Imaginary Lover" (Daughtry) – 5:05
6. "The Ballad of Lois Malone" (Bailey, Daughtry) – 4:30
7. "The Great Escape" (Bailey) – 4:47
8. "Evileen" (Daughtry) – 3:32

== Personnel ==
Atlanta Rhythm Section

- Ronnie Hammond – vocals, background vocals
- Barry Bailey – guitar
- J.R. Cobb – guitar, background vocals
- Dean Daughtry – keyboards
- Paul Goddard – bass guitar
- Robert Nix – drums, background vocals

Additional players

- Buddy Buie – vocals
- Paul Davis – vocals

=== Production ===
- Producers: Buddy Buie, Robert Nix
- Engineer: Rodney Mills
- Mixing: Rodney Mills
- Original LP mastering: Bob Ludwig & Rodney Mills at Masterdisk
- Digital remastering: Suha Gur
- Art direction: Mike McCarty
- Design: Mike McCarty
- Photography: Rick Diamond

== Charts ==
Chart (1978)	Peak position
Australian Albums (Kent Music Report)	46
Canada Top Albums/CDs (RPM)	16
US Billboard 200	7

== Certifications ==
Region	Certification	Certified units/sales
Canada (Music Canada)	Gold	50,000^{^}
United States (RIAA)	Platinum	1,000,000^{^}
^{^} Shipments figures based on certification alone.
