= Classics IV =

American band

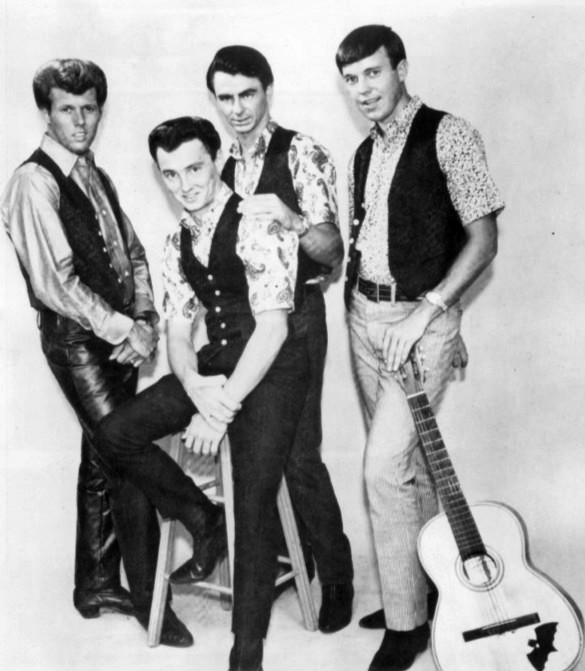
- Classics IV in 1968. L-R: Dennis Yost, Walter Eaton, J. R. Cobb, and Joe Wilson.

Background information
- Origin: Jacksonville, Florida, U.S.
- Genres: Soft rock, blue-eyed soul, pop
- Years active: 1965–1975, 2001–present
- Label: Imperial • MGM • EMI
- Members: Tom Garrett; Kevin Lloyd; James Yoder; Paul Weddle; Shawn White; Dave Soderberg
- Past members: Dennis Yost; J. R. Cobb; Walter Eaton; Joe Wilson; Kim Venable; Auburn Burrell; Chris Bowman; Thomas Posio; Sam Traina; Greg Carroll; Michael Huey; Dean Daughtry; Mack Doss, Sr.
- Website: www.theclassicsiv.com

The Classics IV are an American band formed in Jacksonville, Florida, United States, in 1965. The band, founded by Dennis Yost, is known mainly for the hits "Spooky", "Stormy", and "Traces" (released 1967–1969), which have become cover standards.

== Career ==
=== 1965–1966: Early days ===
The group began as The Classics, a Jacksonville cover band consisting of guitarist J. R. Cobb, bassist Walter Eaton, keyboardist Joe Wilson, sax player Greg Carroll, and drummer Dennis Yost, who had previously been a member of The Echoes. The name "The Classics" came from the Classic drum set Yost owned. He was known in the Georgia/Florida area as the "stand-up drummer" because he played standing. The Classics played Ventures covers and instrumental versions of "Misty" and "Summertime". People started requesting vocals, so Dennis said "I can sing," and it was the beginning of the group's new direction.

The group was discovered performing in Daytona Beach by talent agent Alan Diggs, who became the band's manager in partnership with Paul Cochran and, later, Buddy Buie. The pair had formed an alliance with manager-publisher Bill Lowery and urged the band to relocate to Atlanta. With the help of Lowery, they quickly snagged the group a singles deal with Capitol Records. The Classics' debut single was "Pollyanna", a song written by Lowery client Joe South and sung in a style resembling the Four Seasons. However, after they were later informed that there was already a recording act called The Classics, who had had a hit single in 1963 with "Till Then", the group added "IV" to their name to represent their four members.

=== 1966–1970: Success ===
The Classics IV performed "Pollyanna" on Dick Clark's TV Show Where the Action Is! and the record became a regional hit. But when WABC (AM) radio in New York started playing it they received a call from the Four Seasons' manager demanding they cease airplay of "Pollyanna" or they would no longer get exclusives on future Four Seasons recordings, among other disincentives. The group landed a deal with Imperial Records. Guitarists Cobb and Buie added lyrics to a jazz instrumental titled "Spooky", a 1966 regional hit for Atlanta saxophonist Mike Sharpe. The single made it to No. 3 on the Hot 100 in February 1968 in the U.S. and No. 46 in the UK.

Drummer Kim Venable (born Clayton Kimbal Venable on May 5, 1944, in Eclectic, Alabama, died June 12, 2016) was brought in so Yost could move freely out front (drummer Dennis St. John and bassist Emory Gordy were the musicians on their studio recordings). Wilson left the band and was replaced by Candymen member Dean Daughtry. The band changed its name to The Classics IV featuring Dennis Yost and enjoyed two more top-10 hits, "Stormy" (1968, Hot 100 No. 5) and "Traces" (1969, Hot 100 No. 2, Easy Listening No. 2), the latter of which Emory Gordy also co-wrote. Cobb and Buie borrowed heavily from 1936's "Every Day with Jesus" by Robert C. and Wendell P. Loveless to pen the top 20 follow-up "Every Day With You Girl" (1969, Hot 100 No. 19, Easy Listening No. 12).

"Spooky", "Stormy", and "Traces" each sold over one million units and all were awarded gold discs by the R.I.A.A. Those three hits plus "Every Day With You Girl" also appeared in the 1977 film The Chicken Chronicles.

In 1970, Cobb, Buie and Daughtry formed what would become Atlanta Rhythm Section with Candymen drummer Robert Nix. However, the former two remained active as writers and producers for the band. After recovering from a car accident suffered in May 1969, Eaton left the band and later on became an electronics expert, working for Unisys.

=== 1970–1975: Later years ===
With Yost as the remaining original member, the group changed its name again to Dennis Yost and the Classics IV. After Imperial was absorbed into United Artists Records, the group signed with MGM South. In 1971 after working for other Lowery artists Tommy Roe and the Swingin' Medallions, Michael Huey became the drummer. During this period Huey also became the staff drummer for Lowery Studios and later moved to Los Angeles.

The band's subsequent releases were less successful, despite the final top 40 hit, "What Am I Crying For?" which peaked at No. 39 in 1972. By this time, the partnership between Cochran and Buie ended. After the release of "My First Day Without Her" in 1975, Yost disbanded the group and returned to Florida.

=== 1975–2001: After Classics IV ===
In 1977, Yost returned to performing on the Holiday Inn circuit, this time simply under his own name or "The Classic One." (He lost the rights to the Classics IV name.) The same year, Eaton got a job on Jacksonville's computer system in 1977 and later on worked for the City Hall. As of 2008 he was a professor at Florida Community College. During the mid 1970s to early 1980s, the Atlanta Rhythm Section scored a number of Top 40 hits, notably "Doraville", "So in to You", "Imaginary Lover", "I'm Not Gonna Let It Bother Me Tonight", "Do It or Die", and their rendition of "Spooky".

During the 1990s, Yost used many backup bands including Steve "Stevie G" Guettler (guitar, vocals), Jeff "JT" Strickler (bass guitar, vocals), Steve Farrell (guitar, vocals), Mike Wilson (keyboards, vocals), and Wes Armstrong (drums, vocals) of the Atlanta-based group The Rockerz. He also used Nashville-based Steve Jarrell and The Sons of the Beach Band, as well as the Hitts out of Virginia Beach, Virginia, with Ed Hutchison (guitar, backing vocals), Ramon Gonzalez (keyboards, backing vocals), Andy Crosswell (drums), and David Voss. Other incarnations included Toledo musicians Danny Joe Greenburg on bass and Sid Siddall on drums. Nashville bassist Louie Meek also did a stint with the band. Joe Smalley, David Ford, James Ford and Craig Overton (Rocket88) also backed Dennis as The Classics IV.

In 1993, Classics IV was inducted into the Georgia Music Hall of Fame.

=== 2001–2006: Reformation ===
In 2001, Yost underwent successful throat surgery for a condition that had severely impaired his singing voice. Later on, he started touring under the Classics IV name, which he gained the rights to.

=== 2006–2008: Death of Yost ===
On July 11, 2006, Yost fell down a flight of stairs and suffered serious brain trauma. To assist Yost and his wife with their medical bills, a benefit concert was held on March 25, 2007, at Rhino's Live in Cincinnati, Ohio. The concert did not significantly benefit Yost or his wife financially as hoped, as expenses far exceeded the money raised, leaving the event in the red.

After the accident, Tom Garrett was chosen by Yost to replace him as lead singer. The plan was for Yost to make a few yearly "special appearances", and gradually have Garrett take over as the leader of the band. However, Yost was able to perform with them for only one appearance in 2008.

Yost died aged 65 from respiratory failure on December 7, 2008, the 40th anniversary of the entrance of "Stormy" into the Hot 100's top 10.

=== 2008–present: Post-Yost ===
The current line-up of Classics IV consists of Tom Garrett as lead vocalist, Kevin Lloyd on bass, James Yoder on keyboards, Paul Weddle on saxophone, Shawn White on drums and Dave Soderberg on guitar. The group regularly tours to this day.

== Discography ==
=== Albums ===
| Year | Album | Label & number | US Billboard 200 |
|---|---|---|---|
| 1968 | Spooky | Imperial LP-9371 (Mono); LP-12371 (Stereo); reissue: Liberty LN-10182 (1982) | 140 |
| 1968 | Mamas and Papas/Soul Train | Imperial LP-12407; reissue: Liberty LN-10221 (1984) | 196 |
| 1969 | Traces | Imperial LP-12429 | 45 |
| 1969 | Golden Greats Volume 1 (compilation) | Imperial LP-16000 | 50 |
1970
| 1970 | Song | Liberty LST-11003 | – |
| 1973 | What Am I Crying For | MGM South MSH-702 | – |

=== Compilations ===
- Stormy – Sunset SUS-5323 – 1970
- The Very Best of Classics IV – United Artists UA-LA446-E – 1975; reissue: Liberty LN-10109 (1981); CD reissue: Capitol/EMI 91472 (1988)
- Classics – Liberty LN-10260 – 1985
- Lil' Bit of Gold – Rhino R3-73004 – 1988 (special 3-inch CD single featuring the band's 4 major charting hits under the 'Classics IV featuring Dennis Yost' name: "Spooky", "Traces", "Every Day With You Girl", "Stormy"); regular CD reissue: CEMA Special Markets CDLL-57489 (1991)
- Greatest Hits (10 Best Series) – CEMA Special Markets CDLL-57402 – 1991
- The Best of Dennis Yost & the Classics IV (Legendary Masters Series) – Taragon TARCD-1091 (released through EMI-Capitol Music Special Markets) – 2002
- Atmospherics: A Complete Career Collection 1966–1975 – Raven RVCD-134 (Australian release) – 2003
- What Am I Crying For, Dennis Yost: Going Through The Motions – The Classics IV Label 101 – 2011 [2LP-on-1CD]
- Traces, Song – The Classics IV Label 102 – 2011 [2LP-on-1CD]
- Spooky, Mamas and Papas/Soul Train – The Classics IV Label 103 – 2011 [2LP-on-1CD]
- A New Horizon – The Classics IV Label/CD Baby – 2011 (CD/digital download)
- One Stormy Night: The Classics IV Live at the Ritz – The Classics IV Label/CD Baby – 2015 (CD/digital download)
- Dennis Yost: "Paint My Blues" (rec. 1991); included on Voices for the Voiceless — 2015 (digital download)
- Spooky, Mamas and Papas/Soul Train, Traces, Song – Beat Goes On/BGO 5017261213679 (UK release) – 2018 [4LP-on-2-CD set] (their first 4 albums reissued/remastered)

=== Singles ===
| Year | Single (A-side, B-side) Both sides from same album except where indicated | Label & number | Chart positions | | Album |
| Year | Single (A-side, B-side) Both sides from same album except where indicated | Label & number | US | US AC | Album |
|---|---|---|---|---|---|
| 1966 | "Pollyanna" b/w "Cry Baby"; As "The Classics" | Capitol 5710 | 106 | – | Non-album tracks |
| 1967 | "Little Darlin'" b/w "Nothing to Lose" | Capitol 5816 | (Note: "Nothing to Lose" reached number 142 on the Cashbox singles charts.) | – | Non-album tracks |
| 1967 | "Spooky" b/w "Poor People" | Imperial 66259 | 3 | – | Spooky |
| 1968 | "Soul Train" b/w "Strange Changes" | Imperial 66293 | 90 | – | Mamas and Papas/Soul Train |
| 1968 | "Mama's and Papa's" b/w "Waves" | Imperial 66304 | – | – | Mamas and Papas/Soul Train |
| 1968 | "Stormy" b/w "24 Hours of Loneliness" | Imperial 66328 | 5 | 26 | Mamas and Papas/Soul Train |
| 1969 | "Traces" b/w "Mary, Mary Row Your Boat" (from Spooky) | Imperial 66352 | 2 | 2 | Traces |
| 1969 | "Every Day with You Girl" b/w "Sentimental Lady" | Imperial 66378 | 19 | 12 | Traces |
| 1969 | "Change of Heart" b/w "Rainy Day" (from Traces) | Imperial 66393 | 49 | 25 | Golden Greats Volume 1 |
| 1969 | "Midnight" b/w "The Comic" | Imperial 66424 | 58 | 23 | Song |
| 1970 | "The Funniest Thing" b/w "Nobody Loves You But Me" | Imperial 66439 | 59 | 11 | Song |
| 1970 | "God Knows I Loved Her" b/w "We Miss You" | Liberty 56182 | 128 | – | Song |
| 1970 | "Where Did All the Good Times Go" b/w "Ain't It the Truth" | Liberty 56200 | 69 | 14 | Song |
| 1971 | "Cherryhill Park" b/w "Pick Up the Pieces" | United Artists 50805 | – | – | Song |
| 1972 | "It's Time for Love" b/w "Most of All" (from Song) | United Artists 50777 | (Note: "It's Time for Love" reached number 111 on the Cashbox singles charts.) | 31 | Non-album track |
| 1972 | "What Am I Crying For" b/w "All in Your Mind" | MGM South 7002 | 39 | 7 | What Am I Crying For |
| 1973 | "Rosanna" b/w "One Man Show" | MGM South 7012 | 95 | 35 | What Am I Crying For |
| 1973 | "Make Me Believe It" b/w "Save the Sunlight" | MGM South 7016 | – | – | What Am I Crying For |
| 1973 | "Love Me or Leave Me Alone" b/w "I Knew It Would Happen" | MGM South 7020 | – | – | Non-album tracks |
| 1973 | "It's Now Winter's Day" b/w "Losing My Mind" | MGM South 7027 | (Note: "It's Now Winter's Day" reached number 105 on the Record World singles charts.) | – | Non-album tracks |
| 1975 | "My First Day Without Her" b/w "Lovin' Each Other" | MGM 14785 | 94 | – | Non-album tracks |
