= Traces (Classics IV album) =

Studio album by Classics IV
- Released: 1969
- Recorded: 1969
- Studio: Studio One
- Genre: Soft rock, blue-eyed soul
- Label: Imperial Records
- Producer: Buddy Buie

Classics IV chronology
Mamas and Papas/Soul Train (1968)	Traces (1969)	Song (1970)

Singles from Traces
- 1. "Traces" Released: 1969; 2. "Everyday with You Girl" Released: 1969

Professional ratings
Review scores
Source	Rating
AllMusic	4/5 stars
The Encyclopedia of Popular Music	2/5 stars

Traces is the third album by Classics IV, released in 1969 on Imperial Records. The album was released in Japan as Everyday with You Girl, albeit with different sequencing and three additional tracks included.

The album peaked at No. 45 on the Billboard Top LPs, making it the band's most successful album. The title track and "Everyday with You Girl" are both Top 20 hits on the Billboard Hot 100 and Easy Listening charts.

== Reception ==
The album was met with positive reviews. Billboard praised the album for its top arrangement, production and performance. Greg Adams of AllMusic praised the album for the songs' poetic lyrics and the soft instrumental blend of strings and occasional flute, but states that their song covers have more quality compared to their original songs. The Rolling Stone Album Guide called the title song one of the group's "mandatory furtive-grope numbers at proms of the period," writing that it "later became an elevator music" standard.

== Track listing ==
All songs are written by Buddy Buie and J. R. Cobb, except where noted.

Side A
No.	Title	Writer(s)	Length
1.	"Everyday with You Girl"		2:34
2.	"Mr. Blue"	Blackwell	2:31
3.	"Sunny"	Hebb	2:40
4.	"Free"		2:27
5.	"Traces"	Buie, Cobb, Gordy Jr.	2:45

Side B
No.	Title	Writer(s)	Length
6.	"Something I'll Remember"		2:30
7.	"Our Day Will Come"	Hilliard, Garson	2:12
8.	"Rainy Day"		2:37
9.	"Traffic Jam"	Davis, Roe	2:18
10.	"Sentimental Lady"		2:24
11.	"Nobody Loves You But Me"		3:11

== Personnel ==
Production

- Producer: Buddy Buie
- Photography: Howard Erik

== Charts ==
Album

Year	Chart	Position
1969	Billboard Top LPs	45

Singles

Year	Single	Chart	Position
1969	"Traces"	U.S. Billboard Hot 100	2
1969	"Traces"	U.S. Billboard Easy Listening	2
1969	"Everyday with You Girl"	U.S. Billboard Hot 100	19
1969	"Everyday with You Girl"	U.S. Billboard Easy Listening	12
