= Truth in a Structured Form =

Studio album by Atlanta Rhythm Section
- Released: October 1989
- Studios: Southern Tracks; Studio One
- Genre: Southern rock
- Label: Imagine Records
- Producer: Buddy Buie

Atlanta Rhythm Section chronology
Quinella (1981)	Truth in a Structured Form (1989)	Atlanta Rhythm Section '96 (1996)

Singles from Truth in a Structured Form
- 1. "Awesome Love" Released: 1989; 2. "I Want You Here With Me" Released: 1989

Professional ratings
Review scores
Source	Rating
AllMusic	1.5/5 stars
Louder	2.5/5 stars

Truth in a Structured Form is the eleventh album by American Southern rock band Atlanta Rhythm Section, released in October 1989. It was the band's first album in eight years. It featured a heavy drum sound and a sharper, more synthesized gloss over the songs, a departure from their previous approach. The album refers to the band only by the acronym ARS, since former band members opposed the usage of the full band name on the album.

The album was unable to bring the band back into popularity. It did not chart in any territory, and the band would not record any new material until 1997 with the release of Partly Plugged. Brendan O'Brien, who would go on to have great success as a producer, mixer, and engineer, is featured on this album early into his career.

== Track listing ==
All tracks are written by Buddy Buie and Ronnie Hammond, except noted.

Side A
No.	Title	Writer(s)	Length
1.	"Awesome Love"	Buie, Fristoe, Hammond	3:59
2.	"Listen To The Wind"		3:48
3.	"I Want You Here With Me"		5:17
4.	"Every Little Bit Hurts"		3:56
5.	"What Happened To Us"		4:30

Side B
No.	Title	Writer(s)	Length
6.	"Neon Street"		4:35
7.	"One Way Town"	O'Brien, Edmonds	4:32
8.	"I'm Not The Only One"		4:53
9.	"I'm Going Back"		3:53
10.	"How Much Love Is Enough"		3:44
11.	"Don't Get Me Started"		4:47

== Personnel ==
Atlanta Rhythm Section

- Ronnie Hammond - lead and backing vocals
- Barry Bailey - lead guitar
- Dean Daughtry - keyboards
- Steve Stone - second guitar
- J.E. Garnett - bass
- Sean Burke - drums

Additional Musicians

- Buddy Buie - backing vocals
- Brendan O'Brien - backing vocals, guitar

Production

- Buddy Buie - producer
- Bill Lowery - associate producer
- Brendan O'Brien - associate producer
- Rodney Mills - associate producer on "How Much Love Is Enough"
