= Cherry Hill Park =

Single by Billy Joe Royal

from the album Cherry Hill Park
- B-side: "Helping Hand"
- Released: 3 June 1969
- Recorded: 1968
- Studio: Southern Tracks Studio (Atlanta)
- Genre: Pop, rock
- Length: 2:44 (single edit); 3:17 (alternate extended version)
- Label: Columbia 44902
- Songwriter(s): Robert Nix, Billy Gilmore
- Producer(s): Buddy Buie, Bill Lowery

Billy Joe Royal singles chronology
| "Storybook Children" (1968) | "Cherry Hill Park" (1969) | "Every Night" (1970) |

"Cherry Hill Park" is a 1969 song written by Robert Nix and Billy Gilmore. It became a hit for the singer Billy Joe Royal. His recording was arranged by Buddy Buie, James Cobb and Emory Gordy, Jr., and produced by both Buie and Bill Lowery.

== Content ==
The subject of the song is one Mary Hill, a girl who frequents the titular Cherry Hill Park. During the day she acts as a tease to the boys in the park but at night, when they return to the park, she “pleases” them, as noted in the barely disguised suggestive lyrics. However, she "married away" to a "man with money". As a result, she stopped coming to Cherry Hill Park.

Royal came up with the song's title after a friend described seeing Cherry Hill, New Jersey, on a visit to nearby Pennsylvania.

== Mixes ==
Different mixes of this song exist, some with additional background vocals in the song's bridge, others in varying lengths, the longest version available being 3:17, with an extended finale running 33 seconds longer than the common single version.

== Chart performance ==
Its original by Billy Joe Royal was a hit in 1969, reaching #15 on both the Billboard Hot 100 chart and the Cash Box chart, and #8 in Canada. It was on Royal's 1969 album Cherry Hill Park.

== Cover versions ==
- Buie also produced its cover version performed by the Classics IV which was released by United Artists Records in 1971. He and the Classics IV's manager Paul Cochran were two of the four owners of Studio One. The cover was actually marketed with its title combining the first two words of the original's ("Cherryhill Park").
