= Atlanta Rhythm Section '96 =

Atlanta Rhythm Section ‘96

Studio album by Atlanta Rhythm Section
- Released: April 2, 1996
- Recorded: ?
- Genre: Southern rock
- Length: 49:23
- Label: CMC International
- Producer: Buddy Buie

Atlanta Rhythm Section chronology
Truth in a Structured Form (1989)	Atlanta Rhythm Section ‘96 (1996)	Partly Plugged (1997)

Atlanta Rhythm Section '96 is an album by the American Southern rock band Atlanta Rhythm Section, released in 1996. The album is a re-recording of ARS songs, featuring original members Ronnie Hammond, Barry Bailey, and Dean Daughtry. The album features different takes on the classic songs including more guitar heavy versions of "So Into You" and "Spooky".

== CMC International (1996) original track listing ==
1. "So In To You" (Buie, Daughtry, Nix) – 6:42
2. "Champagne Jam" (Buie, Cobb, Nix) – 4:43
3. "Jukin'" (Buie, Nix) – 3:32
4. "Imaginary Lover" (Buie, Daughtry, Nix) – 5:05
5. "Spooky" (Buie, Cobb, Middlebrooks) – 4:55
6. "Doraville" (Bailey, Buie, Nix) – 3:35
7. "Georgia Rhythm" (Buie, Cobb, Nix) – 5:29
8. "Free Spirit" (Buie, Hammond, Nix) – 3:58
9. "I'm Not Gonna Let It Bother Me Tonight" (Buie, Daughtry, Nix) – 4:31
10. "Do It or Die" (Buie, Cobb, Hammond) – 3:18
11. "Dog Days" (Buie, Daughtry, Nix) – 3:35
12. "Homesick" (Buie, Cobb) – 4:58

== Cleopatra/Purple Pyramid (2001) reissue track listing ==
1. "So In To You"
2. "Jukin'"
3. "I'm Not Gonna Let It Bother Me Tonight"
4. "Do It or Die"
5. "Homesick"
6. "Imaginary Lover"
7. "Spooky"
8. "Doraville"
9. "Georgia Rhythm"
10. "Free Spirit"
11. "Dog Days"
12. "Champagne Jam"

== Personnel ==
- Ronnie Hammond - vocals
- Barry Bailey - lead guitar
- Dean Daughtry - keyboards
- Steve Stone - second guitar
- Justin Senker - bass guitar
- Sean Burke - drums

== Production ==
- Producer: Buddy Buie
- Engineer: Rodney Mills
- Assistant engineer: Benny Dellinger
