= Alien (Atlanta Rhythm Section song) =

1981 single by Atlanta Rhythm Section

Single by Atlanta Rhythm Section

from the album Quinella
- B-side: "Southern Exposure"
- Released: August 1981
- Genre: Southern rock
- Length: 3:30 (single version); 4:55 (album version)
- Label: Columbia Records
- Songwriter(s): Buddy Buie; Randy Lewis; Steve McRay
- Producer(s): Buddy Buie

Atlanta Rhythm Section singles chronology
| "Silver Eagle" (1980) | "Alien" (1981) | "Awesome Love" (1989) |

"Alien" is a song by Atlanta Rhythm Section. It was released as a single in 1981 from their album Quinella. It is in the key of F-minor.

The song was the band's final Top 40 hit, peaking at No. 29 on the Billboard Hot 100. It reached the top 20 on Billboard's Adult Contemporary and Rock charts, peaking at No. 16 and No. 18, respectively. Overall, it is their final charted single.

== Chart performance ==
| Chart (1981) | Peak position |
|---|---|
| US Billboard Hot 100 | 29 |
| US Billboard Adult Contemporary | 16 |
| US Billboard Top Rock Tracks | 18 |
