= Live at the Savoy, New York October 27, 1981 =

Live at The Savoy, New York October 27, 1981

Live album by Atlanta Rhythm Section
- Released: July 11, 2000
- Recorded: October 27, 1981,
- Venues: The Savoy, New York, NY
- Genre: Southern rock
- Label: Phoenix Gems

Atlanta Rhythm Section chronology
| Eufaula (1999) | Live at The Savoy, New York October 27, 1981 (2000) | 20th Century Masters – The Millennium Collection: The Best of Atlanta Rhythm Section (2000) |

Professional ratings
Review scores
| Source | Rating |
|---|---|
| AllMusic | 3/5 stars |

Live at The Savoy, New York October 27, 1981 is a live album by Southern rock band Atlanta Rhythm Section, released in 2000.

== Track listing ==
1. "Champagne Jam" (Buie, Cobb, Nix) – 5:17
2. "I'm Not Gonna Let It Bother Me Tonight" (Buie, Daughtry, Nix) – 5:55
3. "Homesick" (Buie, Cobb) – 4:54
4. "Alien" (Buie, Lewis, McRay) – 5:51
5. "Large Time" (Bailey, Buie, Nix) – 3:05
6. "Spooky" (Buie, Cobb, Middlebrooks, Shapiro) – 5:13
7. "Higher" (Buie, Hammond) – 5:09
8. "Imaginary Lover" (Buie, Daughtry, Nix) – 3:39
9. "So into You" (Buie, Daughtry, Nix) – 6:03
10. "Long Tall Sally" (Robert Blackwell, Enotris Johnson, Little Richard) – 3:08

== Personnel ==
- Ronnie Hammond – vocals
- Barry Bailey – guitar
- J.R. Cobb – guitar, vocals
- Dean Daughtry – keyboards, vocals
- Paul Goddard – bass guitar
- Roy Yeager – drums
