= Do It or Die =

1979 single by Atlanta Rhythm Section

Single by Atlanta Rhythm Section

from the album Underdog
- B-side: "My Song"
- Released: 1979
- Genre: Soft rock
- Length: 3:27
- Label: Polydor
- Songwriters: Buddy Buie; J. R. Cobb; Ronnie Hammond
- Producer: Buddy Buie

Atlanta Rhythm Section singles chronology
"Imaginary Lover" (1978)	"Do It or Die" (1979)	"Spooky" (1979)

"Do It or Die" is a song by Atlanta Rhythm Section. It was released as a single in 1979 from their album Underdog.

The song was a top 20 hit on both the Hot 100 and Adult Contemporary charts, peaking at No. 19 and No. 11 respectively.

== Chart performance ==
Chart (1979)	Peak position
US Billboard Hot 100	19
US Billboard Adult Contemporary	11
US Billboard Hot Country Singles	92
Australia Kent Music Report	75
Canada RPM Top Singles	43
