= I Take It Back =

Single by Sandy Posey

from the album Sandy Posey Featuring "I Take It Back"
- B-side: "The Boy I Love"
- Released: May 1967
- Genre: Pop
- Length: 2:23
- Label: MGM
- Songwriter(s): Buddy Buie, J. R. Cobb
- Producer(s): Chips Moman

Sandy Posey singles chronology
"What a Woman in Love Won't Do" (1967)	"I Take It Back" (1967)	"Don't Touch Me" (1967)

"I Take It Back" is a song written by Buddy Buie and J. R. Cobb and performed by Sandy Posey. It reached #12 on the U.S. pop chart in 1967, and #6 in Canada. It was featured on her 1967 album Sandy Posey Featuring "I Take It Back".

The song was arranged by Bill McElhiney and produced by Chips Moman.

The song ranked #88 on Billboard magazine's Top 100 singles of 1967.

== Other versions ==
- Patti Page released a version of the song on her 1967 album Today My Way.
- Jeannie C. Riley released a version of the song as the B-side to her 1973 single "When Love Has Gone Away".
