= Stormy (song) =

1968 single by the Classics IV

Single by Classics IV

from the album Mamas and Papas/Soul Train
- B-side: "24 Hours of Loneliness"
- Released: September 1968
- Genre: Blue-eyed soul; pop
- Length: 2:45
- Label: Imperial
- Songwriters: James Cobb, Buddy Buie
- Producer: Buddy Buie

Classics IV singles chronology
"Mamas and Papas" (1968)	"Stormy" (1968)	"Traces" (1969)

"Stormy" is a hit song by the Classics IV released on their LP Mamas and Papas/Soul Train in 1968. It entered Billboard Magazine October 26, 1968, peaking at #5 on the Billboard Hot 100 and #26 Easy Listening. The single, along with the prior release of "Spooky" and, soon after, the release of "Traces", formed a trio of solid hits for the band.

== Chart history ==
=== Weekly charts ===
Chart (1968–69)	Peak position
Canada RPM Top Singles	2
South Africa (Springbok)	11
U.S. Billboard Hot 100	5
U.S. Billboard Adult Contemporary	26
U.S. Cash Box Top 100	2

== Year-end charts ==
Chart (1968)	Rank
Canada	76

Chart (1969)	Rank
U.S. Cash Box	24

== Santana version ==
"Stormy"

Single by Santana

from the album Inner Secrets
- B-side: "Move On"
- Released: December 1978
- Genre: Blue-eyed soul, Easy listening
- Length: 4:45 (album version); 3:48 (single version)
- Label: Columbia
- Songwriters: James Cobb, Buddy Buie
- Producers: Dennis Lambert, Brian Potter

Santana singles chronology
"Well All Right" (1978)	"Stormy" (1978)	"One Chain (Don't Make No Prison)" (1979)

"Stormy" was a hit for Santana when it appeared on their 1978 album Inner Secrets. Their version peaked at #32 in the US and #19 Easy Listening. It was also a hit in Canada.

=== Charts ===
==== Weekly charts ====
Chart (1979)	Peak position
Australian Singles (Kent Music Report)	99
Canadian Singles (RPM)	32
Canadian AC Singles (RPM)	41
New Zealand (Recorded Music NZ)	38
US Billboard Hot 100	32
US Adult Contemporary (Billboard)	19
US Cash Box Top 100	33

==== Year-end charts ====
Chart (1979)	Peak position
Canada Top Singles (RPM)	193
US (Joel Whitburn's Pop Annual)	191
