= Voices of Classic Rock =

Voices of Classic Rock is a rock music ensemble featuring singers and musicians from classic rock groups popular in the 1970s and 1980s.

Voices of Classic Rock was formed in 1998. In 2001, following the September 11 attacks, they released a version of "The Battle Hymn of the Republic".

== Membership ==
Singers and musicians who have performed as part of Voices of Classic Rock include:

- Mike Reno, singer with Loverboy
- Bobby Kimball, singer with Toto
- John Cafferty, singer with John Cafferty & The Beaver Brown Band
- Joe Lynn Turner, singer with Rainbow and Deep Purple
- Benjamin Orr, singer and bassist of The Cars
- Pat Travers, singer and multi-instrumentalist
- Glenn Hughes, bassist and singer with Deep Purple and Black Sabbath
- Spencer Davis, multi-instrumentalist
- Gary U.S. Bonds, singer and songwriter
- Mickey Thomas, singer with Jefferson Starship
- Jimi Jamison, singer with Survivor
- Nick Gilder, singer
- Barry Dunaway, bassist with Pat Travers, Yngwie Malmsteen
- Alex Ligertwood, singer with Santana
- Larry Hoppen, guitarist and vocalist for Orleans
- Fergie Frederiksen, singer for Toto
- Peter Rivera, singer and drummer with Rare Earth
- Ronnie Hammond, singer with Atlanta Rhythm Section
