= I'm Not Gonna Let It Bother Me Tonight =

Single by Atlanta Rhythm Section

from the album Champagne Jam
- B-side: "The Ballad of Lois Malone"
- Released: May 1978
- Recorded: 1977
- Genre: Pop
- Label: Polydor
- Songwriter: Buie/Nix/Daughtry
- Producer: Buie

Atlanta Rhythm Section singles chronology
"Imaginary Lover" (1978)	"I'm Not Gonna Let It Bother Me Tonight" (1978)	"Champagne Jam" (1978)

"I'm Not Gonna Let It Bother Me Tonight" is a 1978 song by the Atlanta Rhythm Section. It was the second single release from their Champagne Jam LP, closely following their Top 10 success with "Imaginary Lover".

== Background ==
In "I'm Not Gonna Let It Bother Me Tonight", the singer acknowledges the world in an uproar, a jungle and a rat race, filled with enough tragic problems to cause a person to resort to the most desperate measures. However, he resolves to not face them until at least the next day, insisting that he will not allow anything to disturb him for the night. He then concludes by asking the bartender for a double. The song became a hit in the U.S. and Canada, reaching #14 and #15, respectively. It did not chart outside North America.

The song was part of a U.S. chart phenomenon known as "The Frozen Fourteen" in August 1978. After the whole top 14 of the Billboard Hot 100 did not move during the two weeks ending August 12 and 19, 1978 (this song being the one at number 14), it then dropped out of the top 40.

== Charts ==
=== Weekly charts ===
Chart (1978)	Peak position
Canada RPM Top Singles	15
US Billboard Hot 100	14
US Billboard Adult Contemporary	43
US Cash Box Top 100	16

=== Year-end charts ===
Chart (1978)	Rank
Canada	142
