= Ronnie Hammond =

- Hammond in 1977

Background information
- Born: Ronald William Hammond; November 10, 1950; Macon, Georgia, U.S.
- Died: March 14, 2011 (aged 60) Forsyth, Georgia, U.S.
- Genres: Rock; southern rock; soft rock
- Occupations: Singer; musician; songwriter
- Instruments: Vocals; guitar
- Formerly of: Atlanta Rhythm Section; Voices of Classic Rock

Ronald William Hammond (November 10, 1950 – March 14, 2011) was an American singer best known for being the lead singer of the southern rock band the Atlanta Rhythm Section.

While not a founding member of the band, Hammond was a member throughout the band's most successful period, and sang lead vocals on hit songs such as "So in to You", "Imaginary Lover", "Spooky", and "Do It or Die". He was known for his smooth, soulful voice, which Ronnie Van Zant of Lynyrd Skynyrd once said was the best he had ever heard.

== Early life ==
Ronnie Hammond was born on November 10, 1950, in Macon, Georgia, to parents and Marie Martin (née Hester) and James Murry Hammond. He was one of three brothers and two sisters. He graduated from A.R. Willingham High School in 1969. During high school, Hammond was a member of a band known as The Celtics, with whom he released a few singles.

== Career ==
Hammond began working at Studio One in Doraville, Georgia, as an assistant engineer to Rodney Mills, in the early 1970s. Most notably, he was an engineer on the Hampton Grease Band album Music to Eat. Around that time, the newly-formed Atlanta Rhythm Section began recording their self-titled debut album at Studio One. Upon release in 1972, the album flopped, and lead singer Rodney Justo left the band to pursue a solo career. Mills, being the engineer for the album, knew of Hammond's singing talent, and recommended that he join the band as their new lead singer.

After Hammond joined the Atlanta Rhythm Section, the band began working on their second album, Back Up Against the Wall. Hammond continued to record with the band, resulting in the albums Third Annual Pipe Dream, Dog Days, and Red Tape. None of these albums managed to find any major commercial success. The following album, A Rock and Roll Alternative, brought Hammond and his band into the spotlight, due to the success of one of its singles, "So in to You", in which Hammond sung the lead vocal.

Hammond continued to record and tour with the Atlanta Rhythm Section through its heyday, but following differences between the band and their label that resulted in the album Sleep With One Eye Open being shelved in 1982, Hammond left to pursue his own musical interests. During this time, he worked with ARS producer and manager Buddy Buie writing music, and he took care of his young son. He also became a carpenter in the Macon area.

He returned to the Atlanta Rhythm Section in 1987, and with the band, recorded the album Truth in a Structured Form, which was released in 1989. He remained in the band until 2001, when he left to briefly join the rock ensemble Voices of Classic Rock. Hammond would never officially rejoin the Atlanta Rhythm Section, instead only occasionally appearing in reunion performances and recordings.

== Personal life ==
In the early 1980s, Hammond had a son, Jesse Hammond.

Later in his life, Hammond would suffer severe clinical depression and alcoholism, which was worsened by a divorce. After four days of heavy drinking during Christmas of 1998, Hammond suffered a severe mental health episode. When officers were called to the scene of his Macon home, they found him with his wrists slit, a hammer in one hand, and a guitar neck in the other. Hammond threatened the officers that if they did not kill him, he was going to attack. He charged at the officers, resulting in him being shot in the stomach, which left him severely wounded.

Following this run-in with the police, Hammond made an effort to improve his life. He largely retired from the music industry by the age of 51, choosing to spend time with his family and work in carpentry. Rather uniquely, Hammond developed a friendship with Sgt. Neal Smith, the Macon police officer who shot him in 1998. Both men knew Michael White, the owner of a local food mart. Hammond, White and Smith all attended the same high school. Hammond asked White to arrange a meeting between the two as Hammond wanted to apologize for his actions. Over the course of time, Hammond and Smith became friendly. Later on, Smith was instrumental in returning the framing hammer and the guitar neck to Hammond. Some time later, Hammond autographed the neck and gave it to Smith. The framing hammer was special to Hammond as he framed many houses using it. Reportedly, the bullet that was extracted from Hammond was also given back to him to be made into a necklace, but it's not clear if this was ever done.

On March 14, 2011, Hammond visited the doctor's office, feeling unwell. He passed away in the office of heart failure at the age of 60.
