= The Candymen =

American pop group

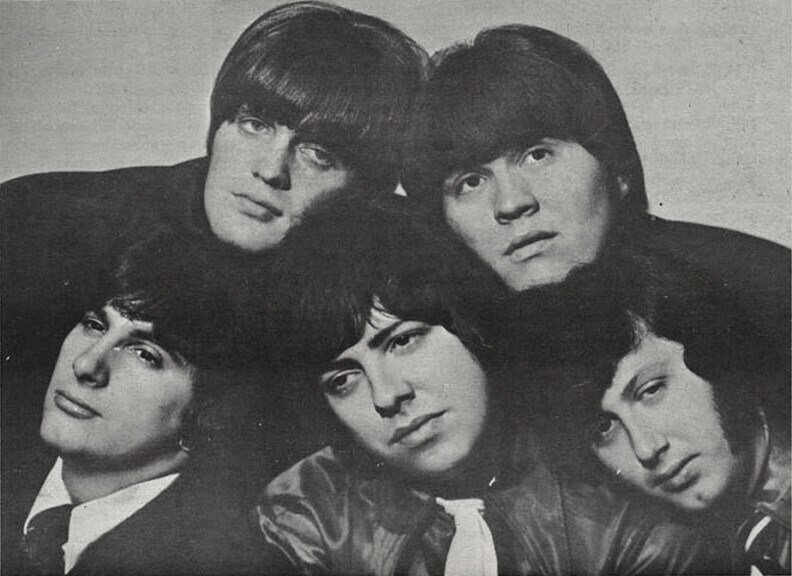
- The Candymen c. late 1967. Clockwise from top left: Dean Daughtry, Robert Nix, Billy Gilmore, John Rainey Adkins, Rodney Justo

Background information
- Years active: 1965 - 1972
- Past members: Dean Daughtry; Robert Nix; Billy Gilmore; John Rainey Adkins; Rodney Justo; Bobbie Peterson

The Candymen (or the Candy Men) were an American pop quintet active 1965–1972 which prefigured the Atlanta Rhythm Section. The group was managed by Dothan, Alabama producer-songwriter Buddy Buie, and included guitarist John Rainey Adkins (who was the mainstay of the live band), singer Rodney Justo, drummer Robert Nix, and keyboard player Bobbie Peterson. Peterson was replaced by Dean Daughtry after being drafted. The band's chart singles included "Georgia Pines" (1967) and "Ways" (1968). Their self-titled album peaked at No. 195 in the US. They often performed as the backing band of Roy Orbison. They opened for Pink Floyd during their first US Tour in 1967.

== Discography ==
- 1967: The Candymen (ABC 616)
- 1968: The Candymen Bring You Candy Power (ABC 633)
