= So in to You =

Song by the Atlanta Rhythm Section

Single by Atlanta Rhythm Section

from the album A Rock and Roll Alternative
- B-side: "Everybody Gotta Go"
- Released: January 1977
- Recorded: 1976
- Genre: Soft rock
- Length: 4:20 (album version); 3:19 (single version)
- Label: Polydor
- Songwriter: Buie/Nix/Daughtry
- Producer: Buie

Atlanta Rhythm Section singles chronology
"Free Spirit" (1976)	"So in to You" (1977)	"Neon Nites" (1977)

"So in to You" is a 1977 hit single by the Atlanta Rhythm Section. It was the first release from their sixth studio LP, A Rock and Roll Alternative.

== Background ==
In "So in to You", the singer admits an instant and mysteriously compelling attraction to a stranger entering the room, and is unable to focus on anything else. He attempts to gain the stranger's attention, hoping that she will be able to make a personal connection and that the "vibe" he feels will be mutual. It has been rumored that the woman in real life was Leslie Hawkins, one of the "Honkettes" back-up singers of Lynyrd Skynyrd and that drummer Robert Nix was smitten with her. This has never been confirmed, however.

== Chart performance ==
The song became their greatest hit, spending three weeks at number seven on the U.S. Billboard Hot 100 and two weeks at number 5 on Cash Box. It did best in Canada, where it reached number 2, blocked from the top only by the Eagles' "Hotel California". "So in to You" was also an Adult Contemporary hit: it reached number 11 in the U.S. and number 12 in Canada.

== Charts ==
=== Weekly charts ===
Chart (1977)	Peak position
Australia (Kent Music Report)	27
Canada RPM Top Singles	2
Canada RPM Adult Contemporary	12
New Zealand	14
US Billboard Hot 100	7
US Billboard Adult Contemporary	11
US Billboard Hot Soul Singles	93
US Cash Box Top 100	5

=== Year-end charts ===
Chart (1977)	Rank
Canada Top Singles	38
US Billboard Hot 100	38
US Cash Box Top 100	56

== Cover versions ==
- 1994: Shudder to Think included a cover of the song on the album Pony Express Record.
