= Spooky (Classics IV song) =

1967 song originally performed by Mike Sharpe

Single by Classics IV

from the album Spooky
- B-side: "Poor People"
- Released: October 1967
- Recorded: Late summer/early fall 1967
- Genre: Blue-eyed soul; psychedelic soul; psychedelic rock; pop
- Length: 2:50
- Label: Imperial
- Songwriters: Mike Shapiro; Harry Middlebrooks Jr.; James Cobb; Buddy Buie
- Producer: Buddy Buie

Classics IV singles chronology
"Spooky" (1967)	"Soul Train" (1968)

"Spooky" is an instrumental song, originally performed by saxophonist Mike Sharpe (Shapiro) and written by Shapiro and Harry Middlebrooks Jr., which first charted in 1967, hitting No. 57 on the US pop chart and No. 55 on the Canadian chart. Its best-known version was created by songwriter James Cobb and producer Buddy Buie for the group Classics IV when they added lyrics about a "spooky little girl". The vocalist was Dennis Yost. The song is noted for its eerie whistling sound effect depicting the spooky woman. It has become a Halloween favorite. In 1968, the vocal version reached No. 3 on the U.S. Billboard Hot 100, No. 1 in Canada, and No. 46 in the UK.

== Charts ==
=== Weekly charts ===
Chart (1967–68)	Peak position
Canada RPM Top Singles	1
New Zealand	19
UK (OCC)	46
US Billboard Hot 100	3
US Cash Box Top 100	2

=== Year-end charts ===
Chart (1968)	Rank
Canada	84
US Billboard Hot 100	26

== Atlanta Rhythm Section version ==
"Spooky"

Single by Atlanta Rhythm Section

from the album Underdog
- B-side: "It's Only Music"
- Released: August 1979
- Genre: Soft rock
- Length: 4:57
- Label: Polydor
- Composers: Mike Shapiro, Harry Middlebrooks Jr., James Cobb, Buddy Buie
- Producer: Buddy Buie

Atlanta Rhythm Section singles chronology
"Do It or Die" (1979)	"Spooky" (1979)	"Alien" (1981)

James Cobb and bandmate Dean Daughtry later became part of Atlanta Rhythm Section and re-recorded "Spooky" in 1979, also produced by Buie. It was the second of two singles released from their Underdog LP.

ARS's version hit No. 17 in the US on Billboard and No. 15 on Cash Box. It also charted minorly internationally.

=== Charts ===
Chart (1979)	Peak position
Australia	96
Canada RPM Top Singles	37
New Zealand (RIANZ)	47
UK Singles Chart	48
US Billboard Hot 100	17
US Billboard Adult Contemporary	23
US Cash Box Top 100	15

== Other versions ==
- A version of "Spooky" was recorded by UK singer Dusty Springfield in 1968 and was released as a single worldwide except in the US. This gender-flipped version was featured prominently in the Guy Ritchie film Lock, Stock and Two Smoking Barrels, as well as in Jim Jarmusch's Father Mother Sister Brother. Springfield's version was certified gold by BPI in 2024. This version has gone on to become the most recognisable recording of the song, having gained over 10 million views on YouTube, over 280 million streams on Spotify, and regular use on TikTok.
- Lydia Lunch released a version of the song on her 1980 album Queen of Siam. The lyrics are addressed to "a spooky little boy".
- Another gender-flipped version was recorded by Martha Reeves and released on the album In the Midnight Hour in 1986. In this version, the line "spooky little girl like you" is changed to "spooky old lady like me".
- A big band Latin jazz version of the song appears on the 2024 Grammy-nominated double CD Vox Humana, recorded live at Dizzy's Club Coca-Cola in NYC by the Bobby Sanabria Multiverse Big Band. It features Janis Siegel on vocals highlighting the genre switch, along with Peter Brainin on tenor saxophone over authentic Cuban cha-cha, son montuno rhythm, with a jazz-oriented arrangement by Jeremy Fletcher.
