= Studio One (recording studio) =

American recording studio (1970–1989)

Coordinates: 33°54′21″N 84°15′0″W

Studio One was a recording studio located in Doraville, Georgia, a suburban hamlet northeast of Atlanta. The address was 3864 Oakcliff Industrial Court, Doraville GA 30340. It is now occupied by a non related business and used as a warehouse.

The studio was designed and constructed in 1970 by audio engineer Rodney Mills, with the support of music publisher Bill Lowery and future Atlanta Rhythm Section manager Buddy Buie. Lowery and Buie, along with the latter's songwriting partner J. R. Cobb and the Classics IV's manager Paul Cochran, were the studio's original owners. The studio output included a diverse range of recordings by Journey, Lynyrd Skynyrd, Joe South, Atlanta Rhythm Section, .38 Special and Outlaws. Singer Ronnie Hammond also started his career at the studio, originally employed as an assistant audio engineer.

Atlanta Rhythm Section was formed from session musicians used at Studio One and utilised the facilities extensively for rehearsals.

Buddy Buie continued to run Studio One until 1986 when he sold it to Georgia State University.

== Albums recorded at Studio One ==
- Atlanta Rhythm Section (1972) - Atlanta Rhythm Section
- Elf (1972) - Elf (with Ronnie James Dio)
- (Pronounced 'Lĕh-'nérd 'Skin-'nérd) (1973) – Lynyrd Skynyrd
- Back Up Against the Wall (1973) - Atlanta Rhythm Section
- Third Annual Pipe Dream (1974) - Atlanta Rhythm Section
- "Sweet Home Alabama" (only song recorded there for the Second Helping album) (1974) - Lynyrd Skynyrd
- Nuthin' Fancy (1975) - Lynyrd Skynyrd
- Dog Days (1975) - Atlanta Rhythm Section
- "Moonlight Feels Right" (1975) - Starbuck
- Red Tape (1976) - Atlanta Rhythm Section
- A Rock and Roll Alternative (1976) - Atlanta Rhythm Section
- Moonlight Feels Right (1976) - Starbuck
- Street Survivors (1977) - Lynyrd Skynyrd
- Stillwater (1977) - Stillwater
- Champagne Jam (1978) - Atlanta Rhythm Section
- Super Jam 1 (1978) - Southern Rock All-Stars
- Blackbird (1979) - Mose Jones
- I Reserve the Right! (1979) - Stillwater
- Rockin' into the Night (1979) - .38 Special
- Play It As It Lays (1979) - Alicia Bridges
- Wild-Eyed Southern Boys (1981) - .38 Special
- Runnin' Free (1981, not released until 1998) - Stillwater
- Tour de Force (1983) - .38 Special
- Here, There & Back (1983) - Allen Collins Band
- Jamboree (1986) - Guadalcanal Diary
- Monument (1988) - Hallows Eve

== Notes ==
In The Know (1980) - Jake Sandborn Brace Yourself (1982) - Road Dogs
