= Imaginary Lover =

Single by Atlanta Rhythm Section

from the album Champagne Jam
- B-side: "Silent Treatment"
- Released: February 1978
- Recorded: 1977
- Genre: Soft rock • Southern rock
- Length: 4:10 (single version); 5:05 (album version)
- Label: Polydor
- Songwriter: Buie/Nix/Daughtry
- Producer: Buie

Atlanta Rhythm Section singles chronology
| "Georgia Rhythm" (1977) | "Imaginary Lover" (1978) | "I'm Not Gonna Let It Bother Me Tonight" (1978) |

"Imaginary Lover" is a song by the Atlanta Rhythm Section, released in 1978 as a single from their seventh album Champagne Jam.

The song reached number 7 on the U.S. Billboard Hot 100 and number 9 in Canada. It is the group's second biggest hit, just behind "So in to You".

"Imaginary Lover" extols the virtues of fantasy and "private pleasure" as being an easy way to guaranteed satisfaction in the absence of an actual lover. It also implies the superiority at times of imaginary lovers to real ones, eliminating the complications of relating to an actual partner as well as the possibilities of disagreement, rejection, or boredom.

Nancy Sinatra included her version on her 1998 album, Sheet Music.

== 45 rpm playback incident ==
In 1978, an FM radio station accidentally played the song at the wrong speed of 45 rpm. The radio station received favorable calls and opted to let the song play at the incorrect speed. Sonically, the vocals resembled the voice of Stevie Nicks, who later heard of the incident and purchased the record. Upon playing the record at 45 rpm, she said that it gave her the chills and that it sounded "exactly like something I’d sing, the way I’d sing it". While Nicks was presenting demos for the Tusk album, she mixed in the sped up version of "Imaginary Lover" with her other material. One of her bandmates, Christine McVie, assumed that it was an original composition from Nicks and complimented her. Fleetwood Mac engineer Hernán Rojas later heard that the Atlanta Rhythm Section learned of the incident and "didn't find it as funny as we did".

== Charts ==
=== Weekly charts ===
| Chart (1978) | Peak position |
|---|---|
| Australia Kent Music Report | 49 |
| Canadian RPM Top Singles | 9 |
| US Billboard Hot 100 | 7 |
| US Billboard Adult Contemporary | 20 |
| US Cash Box Top 100 | 9 |

=== Year-end charts ===
| Chart (1978) | Rank |
|---|---|
| Canada | 74 |
| US Billboard Hot 100 | 51 |
| US Cash Box | 73 |
