= Atlanta Rhythm Section =

American rock band

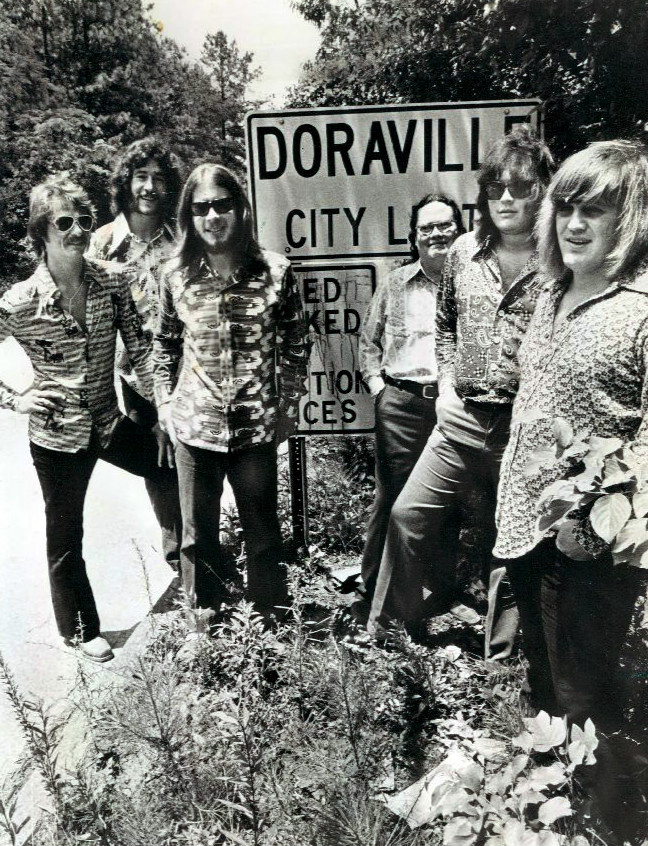
- Atlanta Rhythm Section in 1977. From left to right: J. R. Cobb, Ronnie Hammond, Barry Bailey, Paul Goddard, Robert Nix, Dean Daughtry.

Background information
- Also known as: ARS
- Origin: Doraville, Georgia, U.S.
- Genres: Southern rock; blues; soft rock
- Years active: 1970–present
- Labels: Polydor; Columbia; CMC; Platinum
- Members: Rodney Justo; Lee Shealy; Steve Stone; Justin Senker; David Anderson; Rodger Stephan
- Past members: Barry Bailey; Dean Daughtry; Paul Goddard; Robert Nix; J. R. Cobb; Ronnie Hammond; Roy Yeager; Danny Biget; Tommy Stribling; Andy Anderson; Keith Hamrick; Jeff Logan; Sean Burke; Shaun Williamson; J.E. Garnett; Jim Keeling; Brendan O'Brien; R.J. Vealey; Alan Accardi
- Website: atlantarhythmsection.com

Atlanta Rhythm Section (or ARS) is an American Southern rock band formed in 1970 by Rodney Justo (singer), Barry Bailey (guitar), Paul Goddard (bass), Dean Daughtry (keyboards), Robert Nix (drums) and J. R. Cobb (guitar). The band experienced its greatest chart success with Ronnie Hammond as lead singer 1972–1982. Hammond returned again 1988–2001. The band's current lineup consists of Justo, along with guitarists David Anderson and Steve Stone, keyboardist Lee Shealy, bassist Justin Senker and drummer Rodger Stephan.

== Early career ==
In the spring of 1970, former members of the Candymen (Rodney Justo, Dean Daughtry and Robert Nix) and the Classics IV (Daughtry and James B. Cobb Jr.) became the session band for the newly opened Studio One recording studio in Doraville, Georgia, near Atlanta.

After playing on other artists' recordings, the Atlanta Rhythm Section was christened in May 1970, with Justo (singer), Barry Bailey (guitar), Paul Goddard (bass), Daughtry (keyboards), Nix (drums) and Cobb (guitar). Bailey and Goddard had played together in several groups and, like the Candymen, had also backed up Roy Orbison. The group's name was thought up by Studio One's owner Buddy Buie and his two partners in the venture, Cobb and Bill Lowery.

Signed by Decca Records, the band released their first album, Atlanta Rhythm Section, in January 1972. Due to the record's limited commercial success, Justo quit the band, relocating to New York City as a session singer. He was replaced by Ronnie Hammond, assistant to Studio One's engineer, Rodney Mills. Mills also later worked as the band's road manager and sound man and Buie, also the band's manager and producer as well as co-owner of Studio One, is listed first on almost all of their songwriting credits. With Hammond on board, the band's second release, Back Up Against the Wall (February 1973), also failed to sell and Decca dumped ARS from their roster.

Buie's manager, Jeff Franklin, who was based in New York and had gotten the group the deal with Decca, was then able to get ARS signed to Polydor for their third release, Third Annual Pipe Dream, in August 1974. As a special thank-you to Bailey, Daughtry and Goddard for appearing on his pioneering 1970 Christian Rock album Mylon, We Believe, Mylon LeFevre performed on one of the Pipe Dream tracks, "Jesus Hearted People" (Buie, Bailey, Goddard, Daughtry and Rodney Mills had all been regular players at Master Sound and LeFevre's studio, LeFevre Sound, before they built Studio One). Pipe Dream yielded the band's first hit single, "Doraville", which peaked at #35 and pulled the album up to #74 on Billboard's Top 200 by November 1974.

The band's next two releases, Dog Days (August 1975) and Red Tape (April 1976), sold in even lesser quantities, but ARS toured extensively in 1975–1976, with numerous shows in the South, Northeast and Midwest. On July 18, 1975 the band appeared with the Atlanta Symphony Orchestra during an outdoor show in Atlanta in Chastain Park; in August they opened for The Who at the Gator Bowl in Jacksonville, Florida and for The Rolling Stones at the Municipal Auditorium in West Palm Beach, Florida.

== Hit years ==
The increased exposure paid off as the group's next album, A Rock and Roll Alternative (December 1976), rose to #13 on the Billboard chart and was certified gold in the spring of 1977. The debut single from the record, "So in to You", peaked at #7 on April 30.

On September 3, 1977 ARS played their biggest show yet, the Dog Day Rockfest at Atlanta's Grant Field on the campus of Georgia Tech. Heart and Foreigner were the opening acts and Bob Seger and the Silver Bullet Band co-headlined with ARS.

In January 1978 ARS released what would turn out to be its most successful album, Champagne Jam, which led off with the song "Large Time", a tribute to Lynyrd Skynyrd, some of whom had lost their lives in a plane crash the previous October. Champagne Jam became their biggest-selling album, selling over a million and certified platinum. The album provided two more hits for the band, "Imaginary Lover" (#7) and "I'm Not Gonna Let It Bother Me Tonight" (#14).

On June 24, 1978 the band appeared at the Knebworth Festival in Knebworth, England before a crowd of 60,000 on a bill that included Genesis, Jefferson Starship, Tom Petty and the Heartbreakers, Brand X, Devo and Roy Harper.

On July 1, 1978 the band played before more than 80,000 at Texxas Jam at the Cotton Bowl in Dallas, Texas, with various other artists including Walter Egan, Van Halen, Eddie Money, Head East, Journey, Heart, Ted Nugent and Aerosmith.

On August 26, 1978 it was Canada Jam at Mosport Park in Bowmanville, Ontario, Canada, before their largest audience yet (over 110,000) with the Doobie Brothers and the Commodores, among others. The following week, ARS had a rock festival of their own, Champagne Jam, at Grant Field at Georgia Tech on September 3, 1978, which also included Santana, the Doobie Brothers, Eddie Money, Mose Jones and Mother's Finest.

Three weeks later, they appeared on the White House lawn at President Jimmy Carter's invitation for his son Chip's 28th birthday party. The band had previously met Carter while he was still governor of Georgia during a press junket for their third album and had campaigned for him in 1976 during his run for the presidency.

The eighth Atlanta Rhythm Section album, Underdog, was released in June 1979 and produced Top 20 hits "Do It or Die" (#19) and "Spooky" (#17), a remake of Cobb's and Buie's 1968 Classics IV hit.

Early in 1979, drummer Robert Nix, the group's primary lyricist, had a falling out with manager/producer Buie over the group's musical direction. Nix wished to move the band in a more rocking direction while Buie was content with their current approach, which incorporated the mellower ballads. The rest of the band's dissatisfaction with Nix's excessive "lifestyle choices" sealed his fate and he was replaced by Roy Yeager, who had previously played for Lobo.

Champagne Jam II, on July 7, 1979 at Georgia Tech, featured ARS, Aerosmith, the Cars, Dixie Dregs, Mother's Finest and Whiteface. That October, an ARS live performance from Studio One was released as the double live set Are You Ready.

== Decline and departures ==
In August 1980 ARS performed three concerts in Japan alongside Cheap Trick and other acts as a part of Japan Jam 2.

The Boys from Doraville (August 1980) showed a steep falling off in sales for the group as radio programmers began turning their attention away from Southern rock to other rock genres, such as new wave. The album provided no hit singles and was their last for Polydor. Another reason for the drop-off in sales may have been the departure of their advocate, Arnie Geller, from Polydor in 1977 to form the Buie/Geller Organization and BGO Records with Buddy Buie. As a result, the group departed Polydor, which led to a breach of contract lawsuit from the company that was later settled in the band's favor.

Bruce Lundvall offered a better deal at Columbia Records (CBS), who released the next ARS album, Quinella in August 1981, containing the hit "Alien" (#29) but, like The Boys From Doraville, struggled with sales.

In 1982 ARS worked on a second album for CBS, to be titled Longing For A Feeling ("Sleep With One Eye Open", a song on the unreleased album, had also been put forth as a possible title). Before completion, CBS wanted the band to drop some of the tracks and record more. Buie and the band refused, the album was shelved, and CBS dropped its contract with ARS. "It kind of put the brakes on their career", said producer Bill Lowery, "And the other problem was that we couldn't get out of our contract. From what I remember, they toyed with us for months."

Late in 1982, singer Ronnie Hammond decided to leave ARS for a solo career, joined by Buie (who ceased managing ARS), though their work with Alabama musicians never resulted in commercial release. After buying out his partners, Buie continued to run Studio One until 1986 when he sold it to Georgia State University. Due to high running costs, the studio was closed in 1989, and later torn down. Buie died at age 74 on July 18, 2015.

Drummer Roy Yeager tripped over a fallen tree while the band was on tour in Daytona Beach in 1982 and suffered a severe broken leg. One of the band's road crew, Danny Biget, took over on drums, and ARS persuaded Rodney Justo to return to do some shows in early 1983. Justo had moved from session singer to lead singer again in the mid-1970s with a group from Alabama called Beaverteeth. He then left the music industry for a number of years and eventually took up a sales position with a wine company.

During 1983–1984, the group went to Nashville and tried working with Buddy Buie's former associate Chips Moman, a more country-oriented producer, on a proposed new record label called Triad, in conjunction with producer Buddy Killen and former Capricorn Records head Phil Walden. But results were slow to come and, dissatisfied with the country music direction, bassist Paul Goddard and drummer Biget left to work with British producer Eddy Offord in another band with former Dixie Dregs keyboardist T Lavitz and guitarist Pat Buchanan, called Interpol, that was in a more progressive rock direction. The group did not release any recordings. The Chips Moman Nashville project, which was given the tentative name Hardball, was completed but the album, like their previous effort for CBS, has never been released.

Two new members, Tommy Stribling (bass) and Keith 'Hammer" Hamrick (drums), joined in late 1983 and ARS, now without a recording contract, continued to play shows, mostly in the South. Greenville, South Carolina native Andy Anderson, who'd been playing with Billy Joe Royal, was recommended by his friend Hamrick as the new front man and sang on the unreleased Moman project after Justo was let go.

In 1985 the group tried a new singer, Jeff Logan, who had previously been a trombone player with a band called High Cotton. Logan did two shows but did not work out because his higher voice did not fit the band, he was not really a frontman, and he had also not learned the songs. Anderson soon returned as lead vocalist and bassist Stribling went on to leave in February 1986, turning it over to Steve Stone.

In late 1986, J. R. Cobb left to concentrate more on songwriting and session work at Moman's new studio in Memphis (for The Highwaymen, among others) and Stribling came back to play guitar. The personnel shuffles continued as Hamrick also departed in late 1986 and was replaced by Sean Burke (who joined in early 1987). Another new lead singer, Shaun Williamson, was rolled in in 1987. But in 1988, Williamson and Stribling were let go as Bailey and Daughtry sought to revamp the band by bringing back Ronnie Hammond.

== Ronnie Hammond returns ==
In 1988 Hammond, Bailey, and Daughtry returned to the studio with Sean Burke and two new players, Brendan O'Brien (guitar) and J. E. Garnett (bass), to produce a new album with Buddy Buie and Rodney Mills that had more of an "'80s rock sound".

Released in October 1989 on the CBS/Epic subsidiary label Imagine, Truth in a Structured Form, ARS's first album in eight years, featured a heavy drum sound that propelled almost every track and a sharper, more synthesized gloss over the songs, with all, except one, being written by Buddy Buie and Ronnie Hammond, another departure from their previous approach. O'Brien, who was co-producer as well as guitarist on the album, was invited to go on the road with the band but he declined, preferring to continue his career in session work (today he is a much-in-demand producer, having worked with Bob Dylan, Pearl Jam and Bruce Springsteen).

Steve Stone then returned, as guitarist this time. But album sales for Truth lagged and there was another hiatus in their recorded work as the band continued to tour, with Burke's friend Justin Senker replacing Garnett on bass in May 1992 (after subbing a show for him late the previous year in Louisville, Kentucky) and R.J. Vealey taking over the drum chair from Burke in 1995 after the latter suffered a leg injury.

In 1995 the group went back into the studio, this time to re-record some of their classic songs. This new collection was recorded in North Carolina and the resulting live-in-studio sound of Atlanta Rhythm Section '96 (released on CMC International in April 1996) presented a different, less polished take on some of their classic tunes and captured the sound of their live performances from that period. It was also around this time that ARS was elected to the Georgia Music Hall of Fame. The band, joined by "classic era" members Cobb, Nix and Goddard, was honored at a September 1996 induction ceremony at the Georgia World Congress Center.

ARS then recorded Partly Plugged, which was released in January 1997 on the independent Southern Tracks label. It featured some new songs and more remakes of some classics.

On December 28, 1998 singer Ronnie Hammond, who had battled alcoholism and depression off and on over the years, got into a confrontation with police in Macon, Georgia and was subsequently shot by the police officer. Hammond was seriously injured but survived the injury, though he suffered from depression afterwards.

The band's fifteenth album, Eufaula, was released in February 1999 but problems occurred almost immediately as the record label, Platinum Entertainment, faced financial troubles and was not able to support the album as intended.

ARS continued to tour on a limited basis. But on November 13, 1999, tragedy struck. After the band had finished an afternoon set at a concert festival in Orlando, Florida, 37-year-old drummer R. J. Vealey complained of indigestion and then collapsed and died of a heart attack. "It was very sudden, very shocking", said guitarist Barry Bailey. "He was a great drummer, the best drummer this band ever had." ARS then continued on upon recruiting new drummer Jim Keeling.

== Later changes ==
In early 1999, with Hammond hospitalized, Andy Anderson came back to front the band until Hammond was well enough to return. Anderson would come again in May 2000 to sub another show for Hammond. But in 2001, Anderson was back again after Hammond decided to take a gig with another group, Voices of Classic Rock. Hammond then left touring altogether soon afterward to focus on family and songwriting. A retirement show for Hammond was held on December 6, 2002, at the club Whiskey River in Macon. Hammond performed, backed by Dean Daughtry, Justin Senker, Steve Stone, Jim Keeling, Wendell Cox (from Travis Tritt's band) and Mike Causey (from Stillwater). Hammond died on March 14, 2011, in Forsyth, Georgia, at age 60 of heart failure.

In early 2006, Barry Bailey, suffering from multiple sclerosis, retired from the group to take care of his wife, who was sick with cancer. Steve Stone played most of the lead guitar parts from this point on and Andy Anderson's long-time Billy Joe Royal bandmate Alan Accardi was brought in as second guitarist. Accardi, a Nashville veteran, would stay with the band for more than a year before a friend of Jim Keeling, Huntsville, Alabama native David Anderson, from the band Brother Cane, was brought in as the new guitarist in April 2007.

In 2006 former ARS drummer Roy Yeager was involved in a controversy concerning the destruction of a Tennessee American Civil War landmark.

On March 26, 2008 singer Andy Anderson suffered a heart attack just before he was to catch a plane to Las Vegas to join the band for a two-night stand at the Gold Coast Hotel and Casino. Andy's friend Steve Croson (who'd played alongside him for years in Billy Joe Royal's band) lived in Vegas and was able to step in on short notice. In April and May, original singer Rodney Justo returned, joined by ARS's 1987–88 singer Shaun Williamson, until Andy was healthy enough to return later in May.

== Return of Paul Goddard and Rodney Justo ==
In May 2011 original lead vocalist Rodney Justo returned to the group, nearly forty years after his 1972 departure. Original bassist Paul Goddard returned as well, after a 28-year absence. Goddard's second tenure with the band was short-lived, however, as he died of cancer on April 29, 2014.

After Goddard's death, ARS continued to play shows with a lineup of Rodney Justo, Dean Daughtry, Steve Stone, Dave Anderson, Justin Senker and Jim Keeling. Keeling, who left ARS to spend more time with his family, was replaced in March 2016 by Justo's friend Rodger Stephan (who had also played drums with Marty Balin).

== Present day ==
The band still tours, playing mostly festivals and nostalgia-themed concerts.

Their most recent album of new recordings, With All Due Respect (May 2011), was largely covers of other artists' songs (Lynyrd Skynyrd, Allman Brothers, etc.) alongside re-recordings of classic ARS tunes, done at Southern Tracks Studios with longtime engineer Rodney Mills. The album also featured guest performances by Rodney Justo and Paul Goddard, just before they rejoined the group, and Ronnie Hammond, in his final recorded appearance.

From The Vaults (May 2012), released on both the Fuel and Sunset Blvd Records labels, was a double CD collection of unreleased tracks both studio and live and even featured some pre-ARS Candymen performances. From The Vaults was re-released in the summer of 2023 under the title Time Machine with many of the same and some different tracks.

During the spring of 2017, Rome, Georgia keyboardist Lee Shealy was brought in to sub for Dean Daughtry, who had a broken wrist. And from August to October of that same year, singer Andy Anderson returned to the band yet again to stand in for Justo, who was recovering from back surgery.

ARS founder and guitarist J.R. Cobb and his wife, Bertha Ann "Bert" Absher, had married in 1967 and had a son, Justin. They lived in Monticello, Georgia for more than 30 years. Cobb died of a heart attack on May 4, 2019, at the age of 75, at Piedmont Newton Hospital in Covington, Georgia.

At the start of 2020, Lee Shealy, having been called to fill in for keyboardist Daughtry at various times from 2017 on, returned for good after Daughtry announced his retirement from performing.

Barry Bailey died in his sleep on March 12, 2022, at the age of 73, after years of deterioration from multiple sclerosis.

During the spring and summer of 2022, the band's guitarist David Anderson subbed on lead vocals after Justo had to tend to his ailing wife, Shirley, who died on July 11.

ARS co-founder and keyboardist Dean Daughtry died in Huntsville, Alabama on January 26, 2023, of natural causes at age 76, leaving Justo as the last surviving original member.

== Band members ==
Current members

- Rodney Justo – vocals (1970–1972, 1983, April 2008, 2011–present)
- Steve Stone – bass, harmonica, backing vocals (1986–1988), guitar (lead from 2006–present), harmonica, backing vocals (1988–present)
- Justin Senker – bass (1992–2011, June 2014–present)
- David Anderson – guitar, vocals (April 2007–present)
- Rodger Stephan – drums, backing vocals (March 2016–present)
- Lee Shealy – keyboards, backing vocals (2020–present)

== Discography ==
- Atlanta Rhythm Section (1972)
- Back Up Against the Wall (1973)
- Third Annual Pipe Dream (1974)
- Dog Days (1975)
- Red Tape (1976)
- A Rock and Roll Alternative (1976)
- Champagne Jam (1978)
- Underdog (1979)
- Are You Ready (1979)
- The Boys from Doraville (1980)
- Quinella (1981)
- Truth in a Structured Form (1989)
- Partly Plugged (1997)
- Eufaula (1999)
- Sleep with One Eye Open – The Unreleased Album From 1983 (2010)
- With All Due Respect (2011)
- From The Vaults (2012)
