= Barry Bailey =

American guitarist (1948–2022)

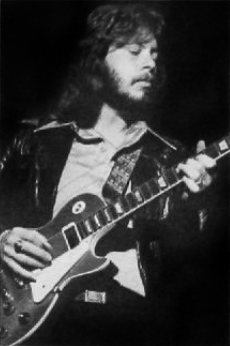
- Bailey in 1980

Background information
- Born: June 12, 1948; Decatur, Georgia, U.S.
- Died: March 12, 2022 (aged 73) Madison, Georgia, U.S.
- Instrument: Guitar
- Years active: 1970–2006
- Formerly of: Atlanta Rhythm Section, The Candymen

Barry Bailey (June 12, 1948 – March 12, 2022) was an American guitarist. He served as lead guitarist with Atlanta Rhythm Section from 1970 to 2006 when he retired due to multiple sclerosis.

== Early life ==
He was born in 1948 in Decatur in Georgia. When he was twelve, his parents gifted him an acoustic silvertone guitar. In the early 1960s teenage Barry played in bands like The Imperials, The Vons and Wayne Loguidice and the Kommotions.

== Career ==
His early work included being a session guitarist, playing on records by Liberace, Frankie Miller and Joe South. In 1970, Bailey played lead on gospel singer Mylon LeFevre "Mylon, We Believe".

In the late 1960s Bailey was a guitarist for The Candymen, a pop group that served as the backing band for Roy Orbison at one point and also included J.R. Cobb, Rodney Justo, Robert Nix and Dean Daughtry. In 1970, Bailey joined The Atlanta Rhythm Section, a band that served as the session band for Studio One in Georgia; this band also featured all of his Candymen bandmates.

Their most successful album, "Champagne Jam", provided their biggest song to date, "Imaginary Lover", which due to a playback incident on the radio in which the version of the song from the 33 rpm album was played in 45 rpm, leading to the sped-up vocals sounding eerily similar to Stevie Nicks, and this caused a high demand for it to be released as a single, eventually going to #7 on the Hot 100.

== Death ==
In 2005, Bailey was diagnosed with multiple sclerosis but continued to play another year until 2006, when his wife Dawn was diagnosed with an aggressive form of cancer; his wife died the same year but Bailey did not return to the band as the MS was starting to worsen. The disease eventually made him lose the ability to use his arms. On June 19, 2009, he was given the key to the city of Decatur. June 19 was also declared "Barry Bailey Day" in the city.

Bailey died in his sleep on Saturday, March 12, 2022. He was 73.
