= Paul Goddard (musician) =

- Goddard in 1977.

Background information
- Born: June 23, 1945
- Died: April 29, 2014 (aged 68) Atlanta, Georgia
- Instrument: Bass guitar
- Years active: 1970–2014
- Formerly of: Atlanta Rhythm Section

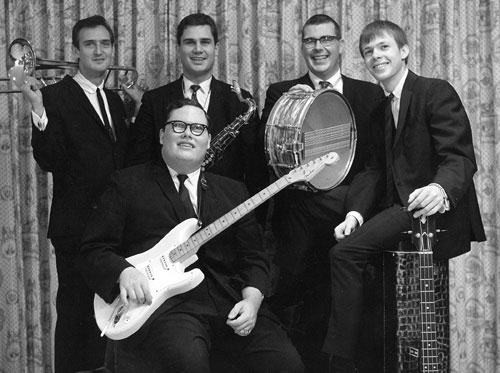
St. John & the Cardinals. Paul Goddard in front.

Paul Goddard (June 23, 1945 – April 29, 2014) was an American bass player. He was a bass player in Atlanta Rhythm Section on two occasions: 1971 to 1983, then 2011 until his 2014 death. Rolling Stone magazine voted Paul's bass solo in the song "Another Man's Woman" from their 1979 live album "Are You Ready!" as one of the top five bass guitar solos of all time.

== Career ==
Goddard was a native of Rome, Georgia.

In the years circa 1965-1968, Goddard played lead guitar for the Atlanta group St. John & the Cardinals. Among the other members of the group was another future Atlanta Rhythm Section member, guitarist Barry Bailey.

In 1970, Goddard played bass on Mylon LeFevre's album "Mylon, We Believe". That same year he joined Atlanta Rhythm Section, who originally served as the session band for Studio One in Georgia. Their biggest single was "Imaginary Lover" which became popular when a radio station accidentally played the song from a 33 rpm album on a 45 rpm mode, speeding up the song and fans likening the pitched vocals to Stevie Nicks.

Goddard's favored instrument was the Rickenbacker 4001 bass. He had poor eyesight, so all his guitars were modified as he wouldn't worry about putting the plug into the wrong output. Goddard left the ARS in 1983 and retired from touring altogether. He worked on an album titled "Interpol" but was never released. When the project was dropped, he made a living working on computers for a school supply wholesaler. In 2011, 28 years after he retired from touring, Goddard returned to the group. He remained in the band for three years until his death.

A bass solo Goddard performed in the song "Another Man's Woman" that was on ARS' live album "Are You Ready!" in 1979 was voted in the top five of the best bass guitar solos of all time by Rolling Stone magazine.

Goddard was once told by a record company executive to "dress like a rock star." He responded by wearing the same clothes that he wore every day, which included shirts and slacks off the rack from Sears or JCPenney. His bandmates said that the only style he would conform to was "his own." Goddard was married once to a woman named Phyllis who died from cancer in 2010. The couple had no children. His sister, Nan Jacobs, also lived in Georgia.

== Death ==
Goddard died from cancer on April 29, 2014. ARS lead singer Rodney Justo said of Paul, "At one time he was 'that big fat guy that played bass,' but once he started playing, he wasn't fat. He was a giant."
