= Doraville, Georgia =

City in Georgia, United States

- City
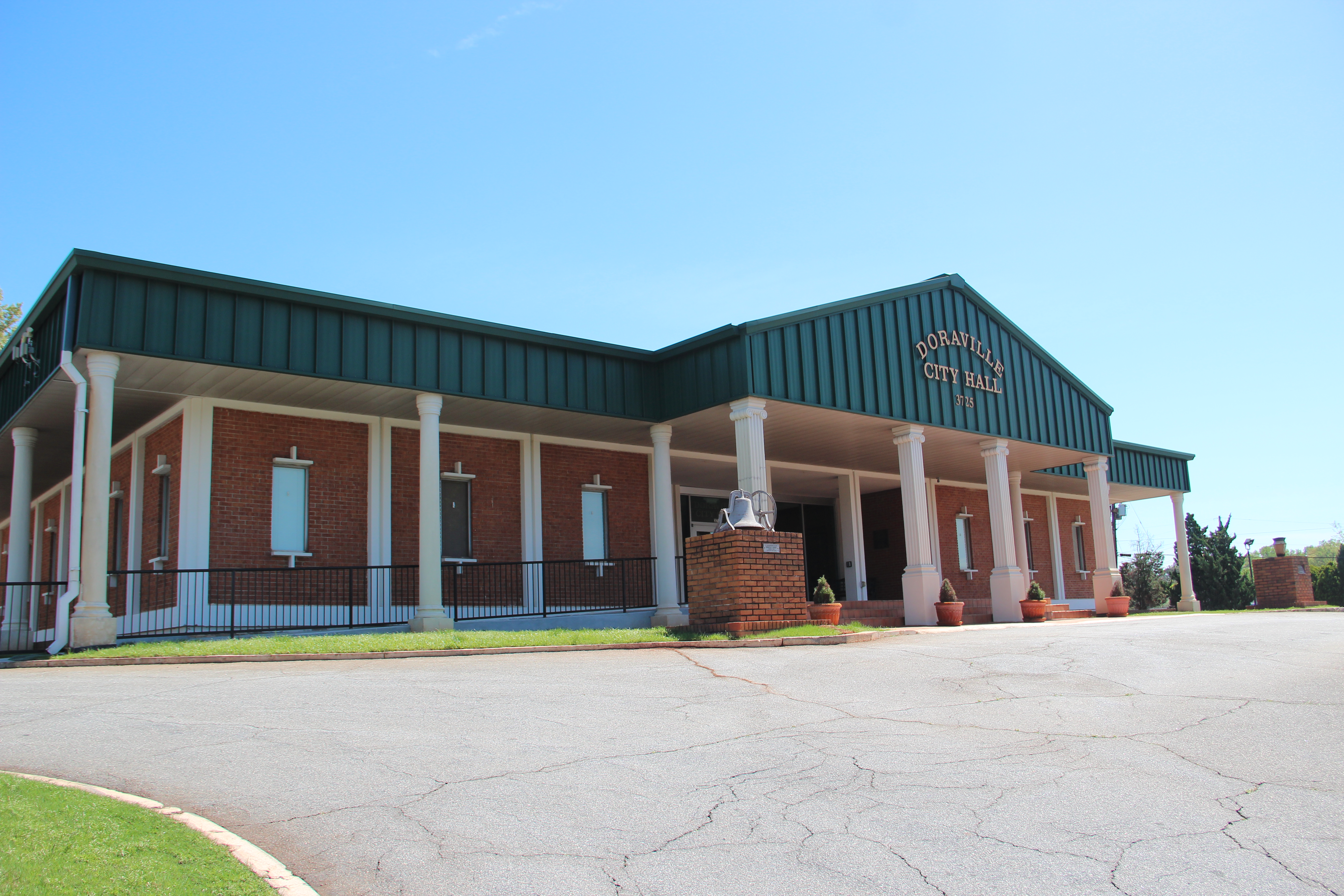
- Doraville City Hall

- Seal Logo
- Motto: "Diversity, Vitality, Community"
- Location in DeKalb County and the U.S. state of Georgia

- Doraville location in Metro Atlanta
- Coordinates: 33°54′19″N 84°16′26″W
- Country: United States
- State: Georgia
- County: DeKalb

Government
  - Mayor: Joseph Geierman

Area
  - Total: 5.00 sq mi (12.95 km^{2})
  - Land: 5.00 sq mi (12.95 km^{2})
  - Water: 0 sq mi (0.00 km^{2})
- Elevation: 1,073 ft (327 m)

Population (2020)
  - Total: 10,623
  - Density: 2,124.9/sq mi (820.44/km^{2})
- Time zone: UTC-5 (Eastern (EST))
  - Summer (DST): UTC-4 (EDT)
- ZIP codes: 30340, 30360, 30362
- Area code: 770
- FIPS code: 13-23536
- GNIS feature ID: 0325924
- Website: doravillega.us

Doraville is a city in DeKalb County, Georgia, United States northeast of Atlanta. As of the 2020 census, the city had a population of 10,623.

== History ==
Doraville was incorporated by an act of the Georgia General Assembly, approved December 15, 1871. From its development until the 1940s, Doraville was a small agricultural community that served the interests of a larger surrounding farming area.

At the end of World War II, Doraville was on a main railroad line and had a new water system. General Motors selected Doraville for a new assembly plant. Doraville grew in the late 1940s and the 1950s as a result. In the late 1940s, plans for Guilford Village, the first subdivision, were announced by Southern Builders and Engineering Company. The 112-home subdivision at Tilly Mill and Flowers Roads was to cover some 58 acres. In 1950, Doraville's population was 472. By 1964, its population was 6,160 and its land area was 1,722 acres. Part of the population growth during that period was because of the annexation of Northwoods in 1949 and Oakcliff in 1958.

By the 1980s, Doraville and neighboring Chamblee attracted immigrants relocating to the Atlanta area who settled along Buford Highway. The result is one of the largest Asian communities in the country. Many Latin American countries are also represented. 56% of residents speak a language other than English as a first language. The Doraville MARTA Station was built in 1992, destroying the few buildings that remained of Doraville's downtown. The GM Doraville Assembly Plant closed in 2009 and was demolished in 2015.

== Geography ==
Doraville is located at 33°54′19″N 84°16′26″W (33.905302, -84.273870). Doraville is northeast of Chamblee, southeast of Dunwoody, southwest of Norcross and Peachtree Corners, and northwest of Tucker.

According to the United States Census Bureau, the city has a total area of 3.6 square miles (9.3 km^{2}), of which 0.004 square miles (0.01 km^{2}), or 0.11%, is water. Crooked Creek, a tributary of the Chattahoochee River, runs through Doraville.

The City of Doraville is located in DeKalb County. It has a humid subtropical climate (Cfa) and average monthly high temperatures range from 53 °F in January to 90 °F in July.

== Demographics ==
Doraville, Georgia – Racial and ethnic composition Note: the US Census treats Hispanic/Latino as an ethnic category. This table excludes Latinos from the racial categories and assigns them to a separate category. Hispanics/Latinos may be of any race.
Race / Ethnicity (NH = Non-Hispanic)	Pop 2000	Pop 2010	Pop 2020	% 2000	% 2010	% 2020
White alone (NH)	2,787	1,870	1,870	28.26%	22.45%	15.96%
Black or African American alone (NH)	1,395	731	982	14.15%	8.78%	9.24%
Native American or Alaska Native alone (NH)	19	16	13	0.19%	0.19%	0.12%
Asian alone (NH)	1,228	1,464	1,687	12.45%	17.58%	15.88%
Native Hawaiian or Pacific Islander alone (NH)	13	8	3	0.13%	0.10%	0.03%
Other race alone (NH)	15	22	61	0.15%	0.26%	0.57%
Mixed race or Multiracial (NH)	121	100	235	1.23%	1.20%	2.21%
Hispanic or Latino (any race)	4,284	4,119	5,947	43.44%	49.45%	55.98%
Total	9,862	8,330	10,623	100.00%	100.00%	100.00%

Historical population
Census	Pop.	Note	%±
1880	103		—
1910	147		—
1920	152		3.4%
1930	195		28.3%
1940	300		53.8%
1950	472		57.3%
1960	4,437		840.0%
1970	9,157		106.4%
1980	7,414		−19.0%
1990	7,626		2.9%
2000	9,862		29.3%
2010	8,330		−15.5%
2020	10,623		27.5%
2025 (est.)	16,365	▲	54.1%
U.S. Decennial Census; 2025

=== 2020 census ===
As of the 2020 census, Doraville had a population of 10,623.

The median age was 32.3 years. 25.7% of residents were under the age of 18 and 8.5% of residents were 65 years of age or older. For every 100 females there were 111.2 males, and for every 100 females age 18 and over there were 112.4 males age 18 and over.

100.0% of residents lived in urban areas, while 0.0% lived in rural areas.

There were 3,607 households and 2,026 families in Doraville, of which 38.1% had children under the age of 18 living in them. Of all households, 38.5% were married-couple households, 27.0% were households with a male householder and no spouse or partner present, and 27.1% were households with a female householder and no spouse or partner present. About 27.5% of all households were made up of individuals and 6.3% had someone living alone who was 65 years of age or older.

There were 3,751 housing units, of which 3.8% were vacant. The homeowner vacancy rate was 1.2% and the rental vacancy rate was 3.5%.

Doraville racial composition as of 2020
Race	Num.	Perc.
White (non-Hispanic)	1,695	15.96%
Black or African American (non-Hispanic)	982	9.24%
Native American	13	0.12%
Asian	1,687	15.88%
Pacific Islander	3	0.03%
Other/Mixed	296	2.79%
Hispanic or Latino	5,947	55.98%

== Economy ==
Since the closure of the GM Assembly Plant, Doraville's economy has carried on with a mix of small, medium businesses. Many small ethnic restaurants can be found along Buford Highway and Peachtree Industrial Blvd. Doraville is the corporate home of Serta Simmons Bedding.

== Government ==
Doraville has a council–manager government, consisting of a city manager, city council, and mayor. The city is organized into three districts, with each district electing two city council members. Doraville also has a municipal court with authority over moving violations and local ordinances.

The current city manager is Chris Eldridge and the current mayor is Joseph Geierman. Geierman began his term in 2020 after serving on the Doraville City Council. Geierman is the first openly LGBT Mayor of Doraville and the fourth openly LGBT mayor in Georgia.

== Architecture ==
Doraville has three distinct neighborhoods that all have a variety of post World War 2 styles. Northwoods has bungalow, mid-century, and split-level styles. Oakcliff has primarily 1960s ranch-style and split-level architecture. The oldest neighborhood is Tilly Mill where bungalow and ranch styles are prevalent. Modern infill homes have been built in Northwoods and Tilly Mill neighborhoods.

== Education ==
=== Primary and secondary schools ===
DeKalb County School District serves Doraville and includes the following elementary schools:

- Cary Reynolds Elementary School (Brookhaven)
- Chesnut Elementary School (Dunwoody)
- Hightower Elementary School (Doraville)
- Huntley Hills Elementary School (Chamblee)
- Doraville United Elementary (Doraville)

Middle schools include:

- Chamblee Middle School (Chamblee)
- Peachtree Charter Middle School (Dunwoody)
- Sequoyah Middle School (Doraville)

High schools serving sections of Doraville include:

- Chamblee Charter High School (Chamblee)
- Cross Keys High School (Brookhaven)
- Dunwoody High School (Dunwoody)

=== Public libraries ===
The City of Doraville operates its own library, in addition to providing local educational programming, in collaboration with DeKalb County.

== Transportation ==
=== Major roads and expressways ===
- I-285
- SR 141
- US 23

=== Mass transit ===
For mass transit, the city is served by the Doraville MARTA station and is connected to the Ride Gwinnett system.

=== Pedestrians and cycling ===
Doraville has an older sidewalk network. Beginning in 2016 the city increased work repairing older sidewalks and installing new sidewalk segments.

== Parks ==
The Doraville Parks and Recreation Department Manages a variety of facilities, including Honeysuckle Park, Fleming Arena, the Paul Murphy Boxing Club, Autumn Park, Brook Park, Chicopee Park, English Oak Park, Flowers Park and Bernard Halpern Park.

== Notable people ==
- Atlanta Rhythm Section, 1970s Southern rock/adult contemporary band, formed in Doraville at Studio One recording studio. The band's first top 40 hit, "Doraville", peaked at #35 on the Billboard charts in 1974. "Doraville" was an uptempo song from the Third Annual Pipe Dream album which paid tribute to the friendly environment of the Atlanta suburb. The town was described in the 1974 song as "a touch of country in the city". Their 1980 album was titled The Boys from Doraville.
- Joe Scarborough (born 1963), journalist and U.S. Congressman
