= Robert Nix (drummer) =

American drummer (1944–2012)

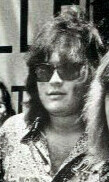
- Nix in 1977

Background information
- Born: November 8, 1944; Blakely, Georgia, U.S.
- Died: May 20, 2012 (aged 67) Memphis, Tennessee, U.S.
- Occupations: Musician, songwriter
- Instrument: Drums

Robert Lafayette Nix (November 8, 1944 – May 20, 2012) was an American drummer best known as a founding member of the rock band Atlanta Rhythm Section (ARS).

Nix grew up in Jacksonville, Florida and graduated from Paxon Senior High School in 1962; also attended Paxon Senior at the same time as Nix was J. R. Cobb, who later became a member of ARS.

Influenced by Joe Morello, Hal Blaine, Cozy Cole and Buddy Rich, in 1964 Nix became a member of Roy Orbison's backing band The Candymen, playing on and off with him for six years. and also played on recordings for artists including The Classics IV, Lynyrd Skynyrd, and Al Kooper. Nix also co-wrote songs for other artists, including Billy Joe Royal's "Cherry Hill Park" and B. J. Thomas' "Mighty Clouds of Joy".

Nix joined Atlanta Rhythm Section in 1971. A member of ARS from 1971-1979, he co-wrote several of their songs including the top-ten hits "So in to You" and "Imaginary Lover". He left in 1979 due to creative differences. He then became the backing drummer, producer and songwriter for musician Alison Heafner, who he eventually married on November 21, 2008.

In later years Nix suffered from diabetes and multiple myeloma, and died on May 20, 2012, at Baptist Memorial Hospital in Memphis, Tennessee, from complications following surgery the previous month. He was 67. Nix left behind a wife and three children.
