= Dean Daughtry =

American musician (1946–2023)

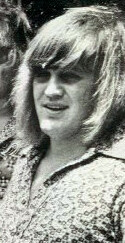
- Daughtry in 1977

Background information
- Born: William Dean Daughtry; September 8, 1946; Kinston, Alabama, U.S.
- Died: January 26, 2023 (aged 76) Huntsville, Alabama, U.S.
- Genres: Soft rock, southern rock
- Occupation: Musician
- Instrument: Keyboards

William Dean Daughtry (September 8, 1946 – January 26, 2023) was an American musician.

Daughtry was the keyboardist for The Candymen, a group that was known for being Roy Orbison's backup band. Daughtry also became the keyboardist for the Classics IV, a group known primarily for the hit songs "Spooky", "Stormy", and "Traces". He, along with Classics IV bandmate J. R. Cobb and Candymen bandmates Robert Nix, Barry Bailey, and Rodney Justo, founded the Atlanta Rhythm Section in 1971. He was the sole constant member until retiring in 2020. They had two US top ten hits: "So in to You" (in 1977) and "Imaginary Lover" (in 1978), both of which reached #7 on the Billboard Hot 100. A new rendition of "Spooky" also made it to #17 in 1979.

Daughtry was born in Kinston, Alabama. He died in Huntsville, Alabama, on January 26, 2023, at the age of 76.
