= J. R. Cobb =

American guitarist and songwriter (1944–2019)

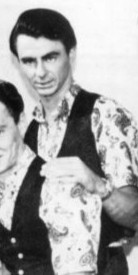
- Cobb in 1968

Background information
- Born: James Barney Cobb Jr. February 5, 1944; Birmingham, Alabama, U.S.
- Died: May 4, 2019 (aged 75) Covington, Georgia, U.S.
- Genres: Soft rock, southern rock
- Occupations: Musician, songwriter
- Instrument: Guitar
- Spouse: Bertha Ann Absher (m. 1967)

James Barney Cobb Jr. (February 5, 1944 – May 4, 2019) was an American guitarist and songwriter, most notable for co-writing "Spooky", "Stormy" and "Traces", among others, as a member of the Classics IV, and "Champagne Jam" and "Do It Or Die", among others, as a member of the Atlanta Rhythm Section.

== Life and career ==
Cobb was born to Rose Hutchins and James Cobb Sr. in Birmingham, Alabama, on February 5, 1944. His family later moved to Jacksonville, Florida. In 1953, at the age of nine, he and his two siblings were placed in the Baptist Children's Home in Jacksonville after his father left the family and his mother needed assistance. Cobb called the experience "the best and worst thing that could have happened to me. The best thing, because we would not have had anything at the time. The worst, it was scary not being a family anymore." He regarded the experience as providing him with a strong work ethic and he remained in the home until the age of 16, graduating from Paxon High School in Jacksonville. One of Cobb's fellow graduates was drummer Robert Nix, who later would join with Cobb in forming the Atlanta Rhythm Section.

Following graduation from high school, Cobb became a welder. Jacksonville guitarist Jimmy Amerson, still a Paxon High student, was working on starting a band called the Emeralds and invited Cobb to join the group. After a year or so, Cobb left to join Walter Eaton's group, the Classics, which later became the Classics IV, and included drummer Dennis Yost. Yost would soon become the group's lead singer, as well. The Classics were discovered in Daytona Beach by talent manager Alan Diggs, an associate of Atlanta music publisher Bill Lowery, who invited the band to Atlanta to record. Lowery also became the band's advisor.

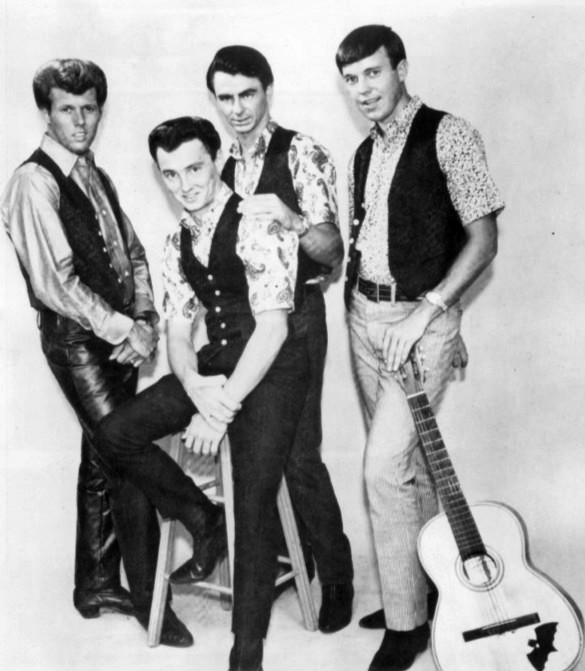
Classics IV in 1968. Cobb is standing in the middle.

It was at his first recording sessions in Atlanta that Cobb met Buddy Buie, a producer and songwriter and former manager of Roy Orbison. Cobb and Buie developed a partnership, writing a number of songs in a trailer owned by Buie's uncle near Lake Eufaula on the Georgia-Alabama border, where they would fish during the day and write at night. Their first hit was "I Take It Back", recorded by Sandy Posey. They then added lyrics to a local jazz song which became the hit "Spooky" for the Classics IV, of which both Buie and Cobb were members. Cobb and Buie eventually co-wrote most of the hits for what became Dennis Yost & the Classics IV, including the gold-certified singles "Stormy" and "Traces". Cobb later wrote or co-wrote a number of hits for the Atlanta Rhythm Section.

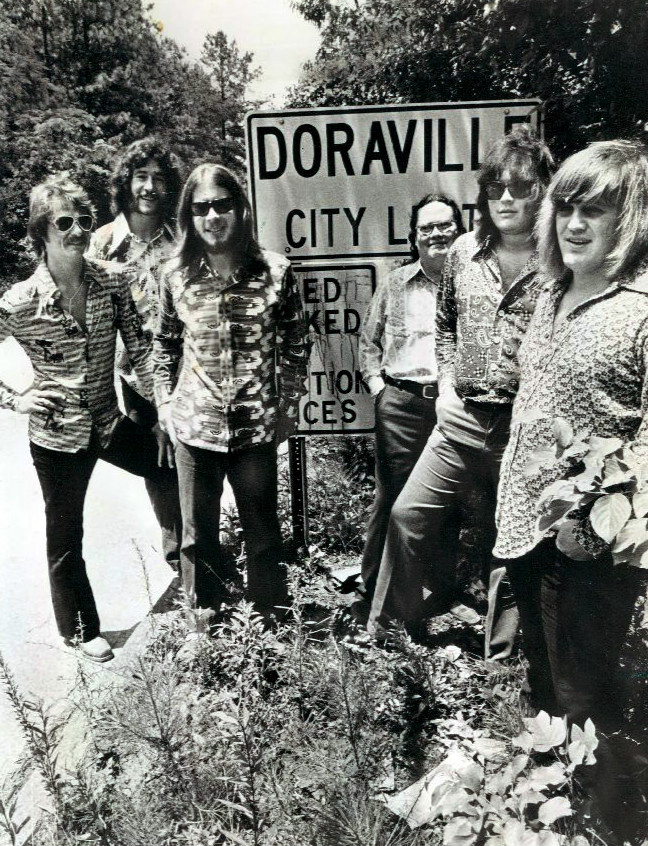
Atlanta Rhythm Section in 1977. Cobb is standing at the left.

In 1970, Cobb became a session guitarist at Studio One in Doraville, Georgia, playing with former members of the Classics IV and The Candymen, which had been the backing band for Roy Orbison. This group became the Atlanta Rhythm Section, as named by Bill Lowery, and commenced recording under that name in 1972.

Cobb left the group in 1987 to concentrate on songwriting and to work again with Chips Moman. He had previously worked with Moman at the Memphis-based American Sound Studio, which existed from 1964 to 1972. In the mid-1970s, Moman had moved to Nashville and Cobb joined him there as a session guitarist and a reviewer of songs sent to the studio for consideration. He also toured with country supergroup The Highwaymen with Johnny Cash, Waylon Jennings, Kris Kristofferson, and Willie Nelson.

Cobb was inducted into the Georgia Music Hall of Fame in 1993, and the Alabama Music Hall of Fame in 1997, where he received the Music Creator's Award.

== Personal life ==
Cobb and his wife, Bertha Ann "Bert" Absher, married in 1967 and had one son, Justin. They lived in Monticello, Georgia, for more than 30 years.

Cobb died of a heart attack on May 4, 2019, at Piedmont Newton Hospital in Covington, Georgia.

== Selected hit songs written or co-written by Cobb ==
- I Take It Back – Sandy Posey – #12 – 1967
- Be Young, Be Foolish, Be Happy – The Tams – R&B #26 – 1968
- Spooky – Classics IV – #3 – 1968
- Stormy – Classics IV – #5 – 1969
- Traces – Classics IV – #2 – 1969
- Everyday With You Girl – Classics IV – #19 – 1969
- Change Of Heart – Classics IV – AC #25 – 1969
- Midnight – Classics IV – AC #23 – 1969
- Traces (Medley) – The Lettermen – #47 – 1969
- Funniest Thing – Classics IV – AC #11 – 1970
- Where Did All The Good Times Go? – Classics IV – AC #14 – 1970
- It's Time For Love – Classics IV – AC #31 – 1971
- What Am I Crying For? – Classics IV – #39 – 1972
- Rosanna – Classics IV – AC #35 – 1973
- Champagne Jam – Atlanta Rhythm Section – #43 – 1978
- Do It Or Die – Atlanta Rhythm Section – #19 – 1979
- Spooky – Atlanta Rhythm Section – #17 – 1979
- Stormy – Santana – #32 – 1979
- Be Young, Be Foolish, Be Happy – Sonia – AC #13 – 1992
- Rock Bottom – Wynonna Judd – HC #2 -1994
