= Buddy Buie =

American songwriter, producer, and publisher

Background information
- Born: Perry Carlton Buie; January 23, 1941; Marianna, Florida, U.S.
- Died: July 18, 2015 (aged 74) Dothan, Alabama, U.S.
- Occupations: Songwriter; record producer; publisher
- Formerly of: Roy Orbison, The Candymen, Classics IV, Atlanta Rhythm Section

Perry Carlton "Buddy" Buie (January 23, 1941 – July 18, 2015) was an American songwriter, producer and publisher. He is most commonly associated with Roy Orbison, the Classics IV and the Atlanta Rhythm Section.

== Career ==
Buie was born in Marianna, Florida, and raised in Dothan, Alabama. He was at high school with Bobby Goldsboro and managed his band The Webbs. He introduced The Webbs to Roy Orbison in a show Buie organized and they became Orbison's backup band for two-and-a-half years.

He was best known as a prolific songwriter, with 340 songs registered in the BMI catalog. His first success came in 1964 when Tommy Roe took "Party Girl", which Buie co-wrote with Billy Gilmore, into the Billboard Hot 100. In 1967, he started working with the group Classics IV, writing with the group's guitarist, James Cobb, to add lyrics to Mike Sharpe's instrumental "Spooky". Subsequent songs co-written with Cobb included Sandy Posey's "I Take It Back" and the Classics IV hits "Stormy", "Traces", "Every Day With You Girl" and "What Am I Crying For?"

He assembled the Atlanta Rhythm Section with former members of the Candymen and Classics IV in 1971. He served as manager of the band and co-wrote most of their songs, including "So in to You", "I'm Not Gonna Let It Bother Me Tonight" and "Imaginary Lover".

In 1978, Buie and marketing executive Arnie Geller founded the recording management company Buie/Geller Organization, and Polydor imprint BGO Records in Doraville, Georgia.

Buie was inducted into the Georgia Music Hall of Fame in 1984 and the Alabama Music Hall of Fame in 2010.

In 2003, Buie left Atlanta and retired to Eufaula, Alabama with his wife Gloria Seay Buie, the subject of many of Buie's songs who had also been heavily involved in managing ARS.

In 2010, the Oscar-winning film The Fighter featured "So Into You" by the Atlanta Rhythm Section on its soundtrack.

On July 18, 2015, Buie died at a hospital in Dothan, Alabama after suffering a heart attack.

== See also ==
- Southern rock
