= Magic Broadcasting =

Magic Broadcasting, LLC was a parent to radio stations

Magic Broadcasting, LLC is a company which owned and operated five radio stations in Alabama and two in California.

== History ==
Magic Broadcasting, LLC, formerly Styles Media Group, LLC, was founded in 1989. The name was changed to Magic Broadcasting in June 2006. The company is based in Panama City, Florida. Magic Broadcasting's Chairman and Chief Executive Officer was Don McCoy. The company sold off all of its radio stations in a series of transactions in 2010 and 2011.

== Former stations ==
=== Dothan, Alabama ===
- WTVY-FM ("95.5 WTVY") (sale to Gulf South Communications, Inc., consummated on November 30, 2011)
- WLDA ("Star 100.5") (sale to Southeast Alabama Broadcasters, LLC, consummated on November 30, 2011)
- WKMX ("106.7 KMX") (sale to Gulf South Communications, Inc., consummated on November 30, 2011)
- WJRL-FM ("Rock 104") (sale to Southeast Alabama Broadcasters, LLC, consummated on November 30, 2011)
- WBBK-FM ("Magic 93.1") (sale to Alabama Media Investments, LLC, consummated on November 30, 2011)

=== Southern California ===
- KDAY ("KDAY 93.5") (sale to SoCal935 LLC approved by FCC on December 8, 2011)
- KDEY-FM ("KDAY 93.5") (sale to SoCal935 LLC approved by FCC on December 8, 2011)
