= Dothan High School (Dothan, Alabama) =

Location
- 3209 Reeves Street; Dothan, Alabama 36303; United States; 31°16′05″N 85°22′52″W

Information
- Type: Public High School
- Established: 1978 (48 years ago)
- School district: Dothan City Schools
- CEEB code: 010914
- Principal: Brian Riviere
- Teaching staff: 84.00 (FTE)
- Enrollment: 1,588 (2024-2025)
- Student to teacher ratio: 18.90
- Colors: Cardinal and Vegas gold
- Nickname: Wolves
- Website: dothanhigh.dothan.k12.al.us

Dothan High School is a public co-educational institution located in Dothan, Alabama, serving grades 10 through 12. Established in 1978, the school is part of the Dothan City Schools district and serves as the 36th-largest high school student population in the state.

== Athletics ==
The school colors are cardinal and Vegas gold; their mascot is a wolf. The school includes football, baseball, basketball, softball, soccer, track, tennis, golf, cross-country, and volleyball.

=== Football ===
Northview is part of an active traditional football rivalry with Crosstown Dothan High School. This was highlighted in a commencement speech First Lady Laura Bush gave at nearby Enterprise High School on May 31, 2008, when she mentioned Northview and Dothan as significant victories for Enterprise.

In 2002, former University of Alabama head football coach Mike DuBose took over as head football coach at Northview High School. He had previously been named Southeastern Conference Coach of the Year for the Crimson Tide before poor seasons and personal controversy caused his firing in 2000. Dothan City school board members voted to hire DuBose, who came in with a wave of publicity and high expectations. However, the Cougars finished with a 0–10 record for the season and DuBose was gone at the end of the year.

This was part of a tumultuous period for Northview football, which saw 39 consecutive losses from 2000 to 2004. The team had won the Alabama State Playoff Championships in both 1981 and 1985, and made it to the playoffs five times during the 1990s.

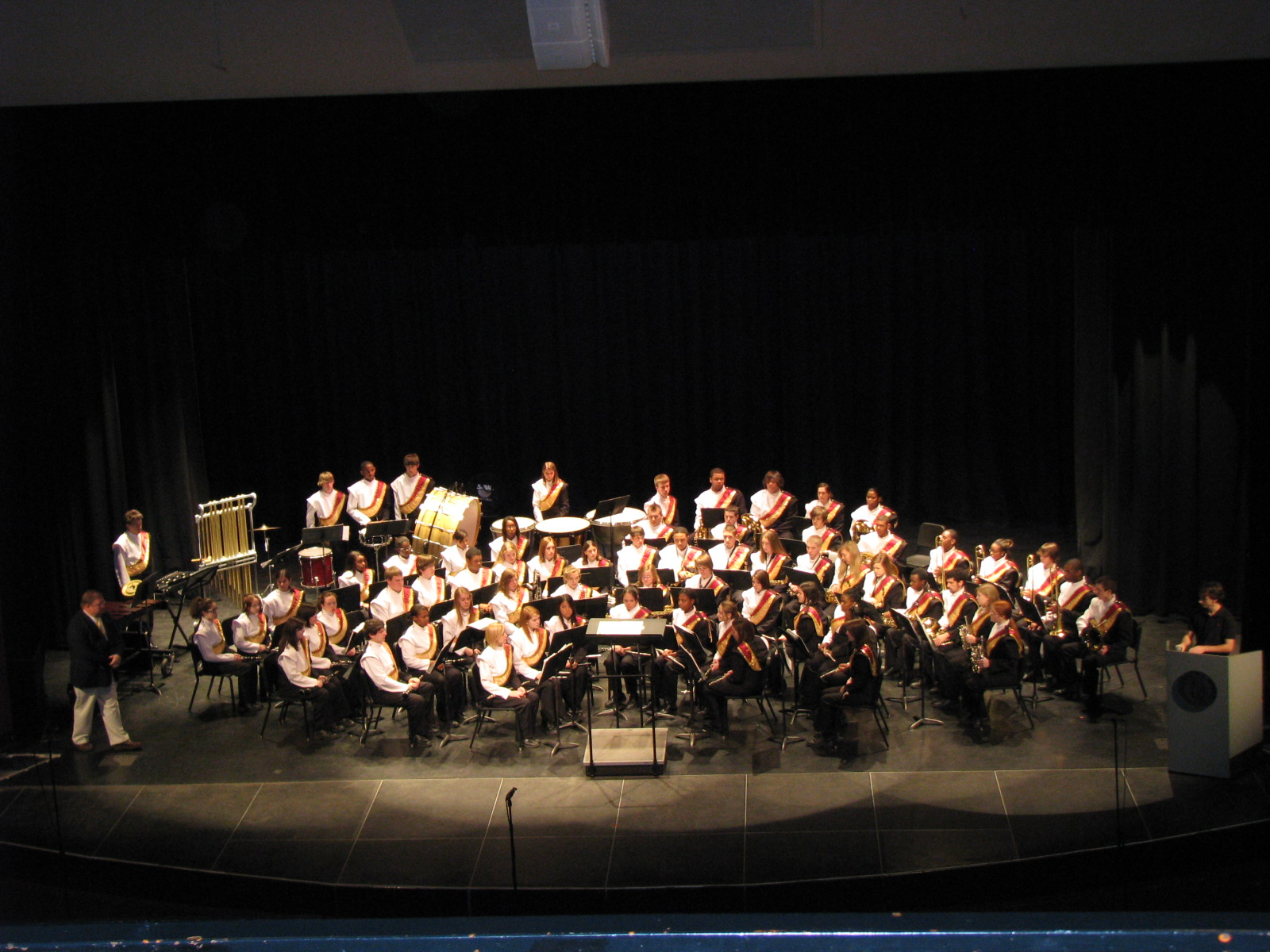
Northview High School Band at Troy University

== Notable alumni ==
- Blake Burkhalter – MLB pitcher
- Lawrence Dawsey – All-American football player from Florida State University and former NFL player (Tampa Bay Buccaneers) part of state championship at Northview in 1985
- Xavier Gibson - basketball player
- Gabe Gross – college football and baseball at Auburn University and professional baseball player (Tampa Bay Rays)
- Kevin Jackson – All-American defensive back at Alabama in 1996
- B'Ho Kirkland – former NFL player for the Brooklyn Dodgers (1935–1936)
- Izell Reese – former NFL player for the Dallas Cowboys
- Larry Roberts – former NFL player, part of state championship at Northview in 1981. He won two Super Bowl championships, 1989 and 1990 with the San Francisco 49ers
- Clint Robinson, Former MLB player (Washington Nationals)
- Bauer Sharp – college football tight end
- J.B. Beasley and Tracie Hawlett - murder victims at Northview
