= WDBT =

WDBT may refer to:

- WDBT (FM), a radio station (103.9 FM) licensed to serve Fort Rucker, Alabama, United States
- WPHH, a radio station (93.7 FM) licensed to serve Hartford, Alabama, which held the call sign WDBT from 2011 to 2015
- WECB (FM), a radio station (105.3 FM) licensed to serve Headland, Alabama, which held the call sign WDBT from 2004 to 2011
