= WLDA =

WLDA may refer to:

- WPHH, a radio station (93.7 FM) licensed to serve Hartford, Alabama, United States, which held the call sign WLDA from 2015 to 2016
- WDBT (FM), a radio station (103.9 FM) licensed to serve Fort Novosel, Alabama, which held the call sign WLDA from 2013 to 2015
- WJRL-FM, a radio station (100.5 FM) licensed to serve Slocumb, Alabama, which held the call sign WLDA from 2005 to 2013
