= WBBK =

WBBK may refer to:

- WBBK-FM, a radio station (93.1 FM) licensed to serve Blakely, Georgia, United States
- WBBK (AM), a defunct radio station (1260 AM) formerly licensed to serve Blakely, Georgia
