= Woof =

Woof may refer to:

- Woof (sound), a sound made by a dog usually called a "bark"
- Weft in weaving, the threads that run from side to side on a loom

== Music ==
- Woof (label), a record label
- "Woof" (song), by Snoop Dogg, 1998
- Woofer, a loudspeaker driver that produces low-frequency sounds
- WOOF (AM), a radio station (560 AM) in Dothan, Alabama, United States
- WOOF-FM, a radio station (99.7 FM) in Dothan
- Woof., 2024 album by Fat Dog

== People ==
- Barbara Woof (born 1958), Australian-Dutch composer and music educator
- Emily Woof (born 1967), English actress and author
- Maija Woof, more commonly known as Maija Peeples-Bright (born 1942), Latvian-born American and Canadian artist
- Robert Woof (politician) (1911–1997), British Labour Party politician and Member of Parliament
- Robert Woof (scholar) (1931-2005), English academic, father of Emily Woof
- Rowsby Woof (1883-1943), English violinist and music educator

== Other uses ==
- Woof (software), a build script for Puppy Linux
- Woof (Pillow Pal), a Pillow Pal dog made by Ty, Inc.
- Woof!, a 1980s/1990s British children's television series
- "Woof" (Shrinking), a 2023 television episode
- Seawolf (fish), marketed in Britain as Woof
- DoggoLingo or woof, an internet language of words used to refer to dogs
- Petco (Nasdaq: WOOF), an American retailer of pet products and services

== See also ==
- WWOOF, Worldwide Opportunities on Organic Farms
- WUPHF.com, an episode of the American television show The Office
