= John Rainey Adkins =

Guitarist and songwriter (1941–1989)

- Born: December 31, 1941; Dothan, Alabama
- Died: June 18, 1989 (aged 47) Dothan, Alabama
- Genres: southern rock; blues; pop rock
- Occupations: guitarist and songwriter
- Label: RCA Victor
- Formerly of: The Candymen, Beaverteeth

John Rainey Adkins (December 31, 1941 – June 18, 1989) was a self-taught guitarist and songwriter from Dothan, Alabama. Adkins experienced commercial success in America during his music career in the 1960s and 1970s with the bands The Candymen and Beaverteeth. Adkins' bands played live on The Ed Sullivan Show, American Bandstand, and NBC's Midnight Special.

== Early life ==
John Rainey Adkins was born and raised in Dothan, Alabama. He attended Dothan High School where he met many of his bandmates and made other important music connections. He played the bass horn in the marching band and started local blues and rock bands. Adkins was known for designing the Dothan High School marching band costumes; His artwork was chosen for the school year book in 1960. Adkins attended Auburn University for one year before pursuing his musical career full time.

== Career ==
=== Early career ===
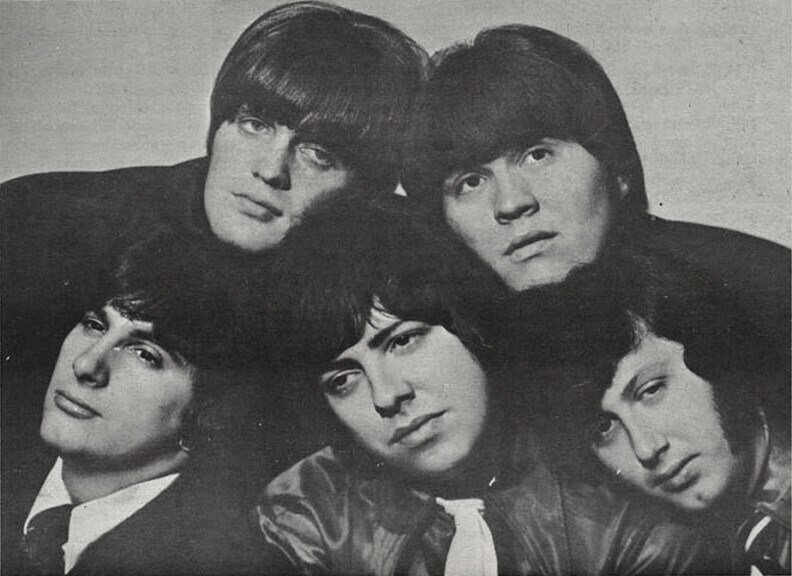
The Candymen c. late 1967. Clockwise from top left: Dean Daughtry, Robert Nix, Billy Gilmore, John Rainey Adkins, Rodney Justo

Adkins started the band The Webs in the late 1950s, The Webs would later evolve into The Candymen. Adkins attended Auburn University for one year before pursuing his musical career full time. A big break came when a former high school friend, Buddy Buie, hired Adkins's band (The Webs) to play back up to Roy Orbison at the National Peanut Festival in the early 1960s. Orbison was impressed with The Webs and hired them on the spot to become his regular touring band. Orbison also renamed the band as The Candymen, a nod to Orbison's 1961 radio hit "The Candy Man." Adkins and his band The Candymen would tour with Orbison much of the 1960s. They would open for The Beatles, The Yardbirds, and the Hollies. They also worked with Orbison in the recording studio.

Adkins played with Orbison on the Ed Sullivan Show on July 4, 1965. He continued to play and write music after his time with Orbison. He co-wrote the hit song "Georgia Pines" with Buddy Buie. "Georgia Pines" rose to number 81 on the Billboard Hot 100 in November 1967. Adkins performed the song on American Bandstand on December 2, 1967. Eventually, the Candymen would break from Orbison and tour and record on their own. They gained notoriety in the music scenes in Los Angeles and New York, becoming a popular live act at clubs frequented by other musicians.

=== Late career ===
In 1972, John Rainey Adkins formed the band Beaverteeth with his brother David Adkins. They were accompanied by bassist Jimmy Dean and saxophonist Jay Scott. The band toured throughout the Florida Panhandle, as well as in southern Alabama. Later in 1973, Adkins was called by former Candymen bandmate Rodney Justo to play with B. J. Thomas on the road. Beaverteeth was featured on late-night musical variety show Midnight Special, hosted by the DJ Wolfman Jack. They performed with B.J. Thomas on his No. 1 Billboard hit "Another Somebody Done Somebody Wrong" song. The show was viewed by millions and the video of the performance continues to attract viewers on social media. Adkins also released two albums on RCA Victor in 1977 and 1978 entitled Beaverteeth and Dam It.

The last musical project Adkins worked on was in 1989 at the age of 47. He was signed to Tree Publishing and co-wrote a song for the band Shenandoah. Adkins died suddenly on June 18, 1989. His image can be found memorialized on the Music Mural in downtown Dothan, Alabama.
