= WKMX =

Top 40 Radio station in Dothan, Alabama

- Enterprise, Alabama; United States
- Broadcast area: Dothan, Alabama
- Frequency: 106.7 MHz
- Branding: 106-7 KMX

Programming
- Format: Contemporary hits
- Affiliations: Westwood One

Ownership
- Owner: Gulf South Communications
- Sister stations: WTVY-FM, WDJR, WDBT

History
- First air date: November 27, 1974
- Call sign meaning: "Mix"

Technical information
- Licensing authority: FCC
- Facility ID: 73179
- Class: C
- ERP: 100,000 watts
- HAAT: 213.7 meters (701 ft)
- Transmitter coordinates: 31°18′03″N 85°35′05″W

Links
- Public license information: Public file; LMS
- Webcast: Listen live
- Website: 1067kmx.com

WKMX-FM (106.7 FM) is a radio station broadcasting a contemporary hit radio format. Licensed to Enterprise, Alabama, United States, the station serves the Dothan, Alabama, metropolitan area. WKMX-FM is a 100,000-watt Top 40 station owned by Digio Strategies and features Atlanta syndicated "The Anna & Raven Show" in the mornings.

== History ==
In 1974, veterinarian Jones Wallace Miller was granted a construction permit for a new FM radio station to broadcast with 100,000 watts of effective radiated power on 106.7 MHz. It began broadcasting on November 27, 1974. In 1979, WKMX was broadcasting a middle of the road music format.

In June 2004, WKMX Inc. (Wallace Miller, president) made a deal to sell WKMX after 30 years of continuous ownership to Styles Media Group LLC (Thomas A. DiBacco, managing member) for a reported sale price of $4.5 million. The deal gained FCC approval on August 4, 2004, and was consummated on September 3, 2004. In 2006, Styles Broadcasting became the Magic Broadcasting Company. After the sale to Magic Broadcasting, the WKMX studio and business offices were moved from downtown Enterprise to a facility on the 7th and 8th floors of the historic Houston Hotel, since renamed the Charles Woods Building, in downtown Dothan.

In 2011, the station was sold again, this time along with sister properties WTVY-FM, WJRL-FM, WLDA, and WBBK-FM. WKMX and WTVY were sold to Gulf South Communications, where they became sister stations to WDJR and WUSD, while WJRL-FM and WLDA were sold to Southeast Alabama Broadcasters, which now owns them along with WDBT and WESP. WBBK was sold to a third company, Alabama Media Investments. The sale was consummated on December 1, 2011. As a result of this sale, the WKMX studio moved to its current location on Highway 231 on Dothan's northwest side.

== Controversy ==
The station drew national attention in May 2001 when WKMX, Inc., filed a federal lawsuit against The Coca-Cola Company alleging that the soda giant stole the station's name and colors for its KMX energy drink. In June 2003, then-general manager Terry Duffie told the press that "the matter has been resolved" although no details of any settlement were revealed.
