= WECB (FM) =

- Headland, Alabama; United States
- Broadcast area: Dothan, Alabama
- Frequency: 105.3 MHz
- Branding: B105.3

Programming
- Format: Country

Ownership
- Owner: Robert Holladay; (Alabama Media, LLC)
- Sister stations: WDAB, WLDQ

History
- First air date: September 1992 (as WUMG)
- Former call signs: WUMG (1990–1994); WBCD (1994–2002); WZND (2002–2004); WDBT (2004–2011)
- Call sign meaning: "The Beat" (former branding)

Technical information
- Licensing authority: FCC
- Facility ID: 10666
- Class: C3
- ERP: 10,000 watts
- HAAT: 132.3 meters (434 ft)
- Transmitter coordinates: 31°11′33.6″N 85°24′42.8″W

Links
- Public license information: Public file; LMS
- Webcast: Listen Live
- Website: b1053.com

WECB (105.3 FM, "B105.3") is an American radio station licensed to serve the community of Headland, Alabama. The station, established in 1992, is owned by Robert Holladay and the broadcast license is held by Alabama Media, LLC.

== Programming ==
WECB currently broadcasts a country music format branded as "B105.3" to the Dothan, Alabama, area. This latest format shift took effect on December 20, 2011.

== History ==
=== Launch ===
In June 1988, Chattahoochee Broadcast Associates applied to the Federal Communications Commission (FCC) for a construction permit for a new broadcast radio station. The proposed station would serve Chattahoochee, Florida, with 3,000 watts of effective radiated power on a frequency of 105.3 megahertz from an antenna 100 meters (330 ft) in height above average terrain. The FCC granted this permit on July 20, 1989, with a scheduled expiration date of January 20, 1991. The new station was assigned call sign "WUMG" on January 9, 1990.

In April 1990, the station requested a modification of the permit to increase the effective radiated power to 6,000 watts. The FCC granted the request on December 14, 1990, and set a new expiration date of June 14, 1991. After one further extension to the permit and after construction and testing were completed in October 1991, the station was granted its broadcast license on October 30, 1992.

=== WBCD era ===
The station changed its call sign to "WBCD" on February 15, 1994.

In January 1996, station management applied to the FCC for authorization to relocate their transmitter, raise the antenna, increase the effective radiated power, and change city of license from Chattahoochee, Florida, to Headland, Alabama, a suburb of Dothan, Alabama. In April 1996, this application was amended to lower the power and further raise the antenna and relocate to a different tower site but retained the move from Chattahoochee to Headland. The FCC granted a new construction permit to make these changes on October 10, 1996, with a scheduled expiration of April 10, 1998. When completed, the station's antenna would be 221 meters (725 ft) in height above average terrain broadcasting with 5,100 watts of effective radiated power.

While construction was underway, Chattahoochee Broadcast Associates reached an agreement in April 1996 to sell this station to Styles Broadcasting of Alabama, Inc. The FCC approved the deal on May 29, 1996, and the transaction was consummated on February 5, 1997. In November 1996, between the sale and the consummation, Styles Broadcasting of Alabama, Inc., applied to transfer the WBCD broadcast license to Gulf South Communications, Inc. The FCC approved the move on January 27, 1997, pending consummation.

In January 1997, with the sale nearly complete, the station applied to again modify the construction permit. This time the power would be raised to 11,500 watts while the antenna was lowered from the previous authorization to 148 meters (486 ft) above average terrain. The FCC approved this modification on May 28, 1997, and extended the expiration date to April 10, 1998. In September 1997, with construction and testing completed, WBCD applied for a new broadcast license to cover these changes. The Commission granted this new license on April 6, 1998.

=== 2000s ===
The station was branded "Z105" from the late 90s-2002. The station was a Top 40 CHR station but then later branded into Rhythmic CHR in late 2000.

The station applied for a new call sign and was assigned "WZND" on August 23, 2002. They became "1053 The Zone" and returned to a mainstream CHR format.

The station was assigned the call sign "WDBT" by the FCC on March 26, 2004, to match its branding as "105.3 The Beat". On September 15, 2006, the station dropped its urban contemporary format branded as "105.3 The Beat" in favor of a classic country music format.

This format lasted just under two years as when The Radio People acquired former News/Talk station WUSD on September 8, 2008, they swapped formats between the two stations. The news/talk radio format was branded as "105.3 The Voice." Syndicated programming on "105.3 The Voice" included Fox Sports Radio, plus talk shows hosted by Dave Ramsey, Neal Boortz, Rush Limbaugh, Glenn Beck, Lars Larson, Dennis Miller, and Jim Bohannon. Overnight, the station broadcast the syndicated Coast to Coast AM hosted by George Noory.

=== New owners ===
In February 2011, WDBT was part of an elaborate multi-station deal that saw Magic Broadcasting exit the Dothan market by selling WBBK-FM to Alabama Media Investments, LLC, WLDA and WJRL-FM to Southeast Alabama Broadcasters, LLC, and WKMX and WTVY-FM to Gulf South Communications, Inc. To meet FCC ownership caps, Clay E. Holladay's Gulf South Communications, Inc., agreed to sell WDBT and sister station WESP to Georgia Edminston's Southeast Alabama Broadcasters, LLC, for a total of $500,000.

After overcoming a formal objections by another local broadcaster, the FCC approved the deal on November 25, 2011, with the caveat that consummation would have to take place before December 1, 2011, or wait until each station's license was up for renewal. The transaction for WDBT and WESP was consummated on November 30, 2011.

In late December 2011, Southeast Alabama Broadcasters, LLC, announced that they would be selling all four of the stations it had just acquired (WDBT, WESP, WJRL-FM, and WLDA) to Robert H. Holladay’s Alabama Media, LLC. The combined sale price for the four stations was announced as $1.2 million. While the sale was pending, Holladay had been operating the stations under a local marketing agreement since November 30, 2011. The transaction was consummated effective December 5, 2012.

On December 23, 2011, the station was granted new call sign "WECB" by the FCC.
