= WECB =

WECB may refer to:

- WECB (FM), a radio station (105.3 FM) licensed to Headland, Alabama, United States
- WECB (Emerson College), a campus radio station at Emerson College in Boston, Massachusetts, United States.
- WFZZ, a radio station (104.3 FM) licensed to Seymour, Wisconsin, United States known as WECB from 1998 to 2009
