= WDJR =

- Hartford, Alabama; United States
- Broadcast area: Dothan, Alabama
- Frequency: 96.9 MHz
- Branding: 96.9 The Legend

Programming
- Format: Classic country

Ownership
- Owner: The Radio People; (Gulf South Communications)
- Sister stations: WTVY-FM, WKMX, WDBT

History
- First air date: July 1, 1968 (as WIRB-FM)
- Former call signs: WIRB (1969–1979); WLHQ (1979–1988); WLHQ-FM (1988–1989)

Technical information
- Licensing authority: FCC
- Facility ID: 25575
- Class: C0
- ERP: 100,000 watts
- HAAT: 316 meters (1,037 feet)
- Transmitter coordinates: 30°55′19″N 85°44′41″W

Links
- Public license information: Public file; LMS
- Webcast: Listen Live
- Website: 969thelegend.com

WDJR (96.9 FM, "The Legend") is an American classic country formatted radio station based in Dothan, Alabama. The station is owned and operated by Digio Strategies. The station's signal, which originates from a transmitter in Holmes County Florida, reaches large portions of Alabama, Florida, and Georgia.

== Programming ==
"96.9 the Legend"'s programming is mainly focused on country music from the 1970s until the early 2000s, with some few outliers. Current local programming includes BJ Kelli in the morning from 6 until 10 a.m., and David Sommers in the afternoons. During the "Mix 96.9" era, WDJR played adult contemporary music with an emphasis on new music while playing older favorites from the 1980s and 1990s. Local hosts included "K.W. & Wendy" on morning drive. Syndicated music programming included shows hosted by Donny Osmond (mid-days), Rick Dees (afternoons), and Deliah (evenings). WDJR flipped from country music to adult contemporary on December 26, 2011 and then to classic country in October 2014.

== History ==
WDJR first went on the air on July 1, 1968 as WIRB-FM, an FM counterpart of 600 AM WIRB, licensed to Enterprise. With both bands covered, the WIRB cluster marketed itself as "Double Barrel Radio". On August 2, 1979, the station's call sign was changed to WLHQ, branded as "Q97". In the 1980s, WDJR had a classic rock format and was known as "The Monster" because of its large coverage area and rock music format. After a brief change to a lite rock format, WDJR flipped to Country music in 1993 by playing the entire Garth Brooks catalog at the time, 3 albums. When interviewed by the Dothan Eagle about the release of the fourth Garth Brooks album, General Manager Hal Edwards was quoted as saying, "Hot Dog! We can increase our song library by 33%!" WDJR was sold to the Hollidays in 1992.

As a country station branded as "The Big Dog" until December 2011, WDJR programming included "Joey Dee & Melody" in the morning, Skip Nelson on mid-days, David Sommers in the afternoon, and "Nik at Nyt" on evenings. Syndicated programming included Bob Kingsley's Country Top 40 and America's Grand Ole Opry Weekend from Westwood One. Some of this staff and programming shifted over to sister station WTVY-FM.

After three weeks of Christmas music, WDJR changed their format from country to adult contemporary, branded as "Mix 96.9", on December 26, 2011.

In October 2014 WDJR changed their format to classic country, branded as "96.9 The Legend".

== Staff ==
Notable former staff include Alan Jeffries, Tom Nebel, Mitch English, and Jerry Broadway.

== Technical information ==
For years WDJR had broadcast from the 2,000-foot (610 m) WTVY-TV tower in Holmes County Florida at the 1,550-foot (470 m) mark. In the spring of 2006, WDJR was forced to move off the WTVY-TV tower in preparation for the high-power DTV transition as the new DTV equipment and WDJR's antenna would exceed the wind-load requirements of the tower. WDJR constructed their own 1,050-foot (320 m) tower just a few hundred yards from WTVY-TV. With the move, WDJR went down in class per Federal Communications Commission (FCC) requirements. WDJR is now a class C0, full-service FM radio station.
