= George Washington Carver High School (Dothan, Alabama) =

Location
- Dothan, Alabama; United States; 31.2319°N 85.3808°W

Information
- Type: Public
- Opened: 1940
- Closed: 1968
- Grades: 9-12

Alabama Register of Landmarks and Heritage
- Designated: 2022

George Washington Carver High School was a segregated public high school in Dothan, Alabama serving African-American children from 1940 to 1968. In 1969 the students were integrated with white students at Dothan High School.

== History ==
In the 1968–1969 school year a few black students transferred from Carver to Dothan under a choice program. In 1969, six weeks before the start of the school year, a federal judge ruled the plan inadequate and ordered all Carver High School to be integrated with Dothan.

== Notable alumni ==
- Artis Gilmore, National Basketball Association Hall-of-Fame player attended Carver his senior year.
