= Dancin' Dave =

Street performer

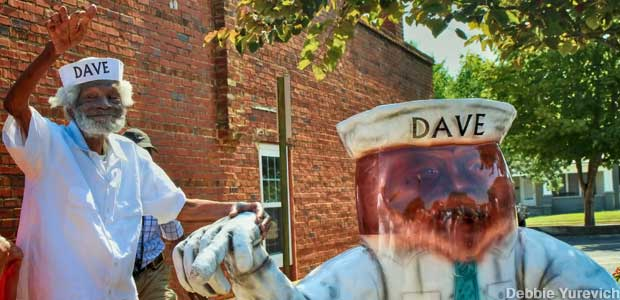
Dancin' Dave Whatley posing next to his Headland Peanut during the unveiling in 2015.

Dave Whatley (31 March 1927 – 21 September 2015), better known as Dancin' Dave, was an American street performer and local celebrity in the Wiregrass, especially around Dothan, Alabama. He was well known for his dances which he would perform for a small offering, and his white sailor uniform.

== Biography ==
Dave was born on March 31, 1927, in Headland, Alabama to Dave Woodruff Whatley and Catherine Pouncey Whatley, he was one of 15 children. His father died when he was only 12, and he was sent to Georgia to live with family. He spent most of his life walking around the Wiregrass, doing odd jobs for money. He performed his gig for nearly seven decades. He would become a fixture at local events such as festivals, where he performed. Many rumors and tales would spread about him, speculating about his backstory. He would perform for many years, until 2015 when his failing health would cause him to move in with his sister. He would die later that year from cancer on September 21 at the age of 88.

== Legacy ==
Dave was a very well known figure in Dothan and the Wiregrass, and was beloved by locals. A peanut statue of him was unveiled in the town, a tradition reserved usually for high-profile figures, just two months prior to his death. He was honored in Dothan's 2015 annual national peanut festival parade. A mural dedicated to him was unveiled in 2017, painted by Atlanta artist Charly Palmer. Fundraisers were held to get his grave, originally unmarked, a tombstone, but after an anonymous donor provided it instead the funds were given to a food bank.
