= WVPL =

Dozier, Alabama; United States
- Broadcast area: Crenshaw County, Alabama
- Frequency: 90.5 MHz

Programming
- Language: English
- Format: Defunct

Ownership
- Owner: Alabama Christian Radio, Inc.

History
- First air date: 2011
- Former call signs: WTBT (2011–2012)

Technical information
- Licensing authority: FCC
- Facility ID: 171667
- Class: A
- ERP: 300 watts
- HAAT: 73 meters (240 ft)
- Transmitter coordinates: 31°25′38″N 86°21′21″W

Links
- Public license information: Public file; LMS

WVPL (90.5 FM) was an American non-commercial educational radio station intended to serve the community of Dozier in Crenshaw County, Alabama. The station, established in 2011, was owned and operated by Alabama Christian Radio, Inc., but a sale to Townsend Broadcasting Enterprise was pending FCC approval.

== Programming ==
WVPL broadcast a religious radio format to the Crenshaw County, Alabama, area.

== History ==
In October 2007, Old Time Gospel Ministries of Heflin, Alabama, applied to the Federal Communications Commission (FCC) for a construction permit for a new broadcast radio station. The FCC granted this permit on December 15, 2008, with a scheduled expiration date of December 15, 2011.

On December 16, 2009, Old Time Gospel Ministries (owned in equal parts by Robert Jarrell, Jim Hemby, and Brandon Jarrell) contracted to sell the permits for WTBT and WEYY (88.7 FM, Tallapoosa, Georgia) to Jimmy Jarrell's Alabama Christian Radio, Inc., for a combined sale price of $1. The FCC conditionally approved the sale on February 19, 2010, and the transaction was consummated on February 22, 2010.

After construction and testing were completed in early December 2011, the station applied for its broadcast license and the FCC accepted the filing on December 16, 2011. The new station was assigned call sign "WTBT" on December 22, 2011. As of February 23, 2012, the commission had taken no further action on this license application.

On January 20, 2012, Alabama Christian Radio, Inc., contracted to sell WTBT and sister station WQLS (90.5 FM, Camden, Alabama) to Timothy Townsend's Townsend Broadcasting Enterprise for a combined sale price of $3,000. The FCC accepted the application for assignment of these permits on February 14, 2012, but as of February 22, 2012, the commission had taken no further action.

The station's call sign was changed to "WVPL" on February 21, 2012.

WVPL's license was cancelled by the FCC on April 2, 2020, due to the station failing to file an application for license renewal by April 1.
