= WTVY =

WTVY may refer to:

- WTVY (TV), a television station (channel 4) licensed to Dothan, Alabama, United States
- WTVY-FM, a radio station (95.5 FM) licensed to Dothan, Alabama, United States
