= Warb =

Warb may refer to:

- WARB (700 AM), radio station licensed in Dothan, Alabama
- Warb., taxonomic author abbreviation of Otto Warburg (botanist) (1859–1938), German-Jewish botanist
- E. F. Warb., taxonomic author abbreviation of E. F. Warburg (1908–1966), English botanist

== See also ==
- Worb, municipality in Switzerland
