= WESP =

WESP may refer to:

- WESP (FM), a radio station (106.3 FM) licensed to Jupiter, Florida, United States
- WLDQ, a radio station (102.5 FM) licensed to Dothan, Alabama, United States, which held the call sign WESP from 1990 to 2025
- WCEM-FM, a radio station (106.3 FM) licensed to Cambridge, Maryland, United States, which held the call sign WESP-FM from 1981 to 1983
- wet electrostatic precipitator (wet ESP)
