= Xavier Gibson =

American basketball player (born 1988)

Personal information
- Born: November 3, 1988 (age 38) Dothan, Alabama, U.S.
- Listed height: 6 ft 11 in (2.11 m)
- Listed weight: 278 lb (126 kg)

Career information
- High school: Northview (Dothan, Alabama)
- College: Florida State (2008–2012)
- NBA draft: 2012: undrafted
- Playing career: 2012–2020
- Position: Power forward / center

Career history
- 2012: Antalya Büyükşehir Belediyesi
- 2013: Panelefsiniakos B.C.
- 2013–2014: Shinshu Brave Warriors
- 2014–2015: Toyota Alvark
- 2015–2016: Shinshu Brave Warriors
- 2016–2017: Osaka Evessa
- 2017–2018: Lakeland Magic
- 2018–2019: Osaka Evessa
- 2020: Niigata Albirex BB

Career highlights
- bj League Block leader (2015–16)
- Stats at Basketball Reference

Xavier Gibson (born November 3, 1988) is an American former professional basketball player for ABA Ancud in Chile. His nickname is X.

== Career statistics ==
Legend
GP	Games played	GS	Games started	MPG	Minutes per game
FG%	Field goal percentage	3P%	3-point field goal percentage	FT%	Free throw percentage
RPG	Rebounds per game	APG	Assists per game	SPG	Steals per game
BPG	Blocks per game	PPG	Points per game	**Bold**	Career high

*	Led the league

Year	Team	GP	GS	MPG	FG%	3P%	FT%	RPG	APG	SPG	BPG	PPG
2013–14	Shinshu	52		28.3	.509	.361	.704	10.2	2.3	1.3	2.1	17.2
2014–15	Toyota	54	35	20.1	.520	.333	.798	6.5	0.6	0.6	1.9	13.2
2015–16	Shinshu	42	42	32.2	.480	.338	.765	10.1	2.5	1.3	2.5*	22.1
2016–17	Osaka	58	39	23.8	.488	.292	.714	6.5	1.3	0.9	0.9	15.4
2017–18	Osaka	28	25	25.6	.497	.213	.753	8.4	2.7	1.2	0.6	17.0
2018–19	Osaka	29	24	27.1	.452	.353	.642	7.0	2.4	1.0	1.0	14.4
2019–20	Niigata	9	9	32.2	.492	.353	.762	7.6	2.4	0.9	0.7	14.4
2021/22	trouville	7	67	22.7	.452	.353	.642	7.4	1.4	1.0	1.3	13.4
2022	ohod			35.1	.590	.300	.701	14.1	1	1.0	1	15
2022–23	Bahrain club	11	11	38.5	-	.-	.-	13.6	3.7	1.6	1.0	25.5
