= Bauer Sharp =

American football player (born 2003)

No. 84 – Tampa Bay Buccaneers
- Position: Tight end
- Roster status: Active

Personal information
- Born: May 3, 2003 (age 23)
- Listed height: 6 ft 5 in (1.96 m)
- Listed weight: 249 lb (113 kg)

Career information
- High school: Dothan (Dothan, Alabama)
- College: Southeastern Louisiana (2021–2023); Oklahoma (2024); LSU (2025)
- NFL draft: 2026: 6th round, 185th overall pick

Career history
- Tampa Bay Buccaneers (2026–present)

Awards and highlights
- First-team All-Southland (2023)

Career NFL statistics as of Week 4, 2026
- Tackles: 3
- Stats at Pro Football Reference

William Bauer Sharp (born May 3, 2003) is an American professional football tight end for the Tampa Bay Buccaneers of the National Football League (NFL). He played college football for the Southeastern Louisiana Lions, the Oklahoma Sooners, and the LSU Tigers. Sharp was selected by the Buccaneers in the sixth round of the 2026 NFL draft.

== Early life ==
Sharp and grew up in Dothan, Alabama and initially attended Northside Methodist Academy, where he played quarterback. After his sophomore year he transferred to Dothan High School. Sharp passed for 1,082 yards and eight touchdowns as a senior. He committed to play college football at Southeastern Louisiana.

== College career ==
=== Southeastern Louisiana ===
Sharp redshirted his true freshman season with the Southeastern Louisiana Lions. He caught 11 passes for 78 yards and one touchdown while also rushing ten times for 83 yards at quarterback in the wildcat formation. Sharp was named first team All-Southland Conference as a redshirt sophomore after catching 29 passes for 288 yards and three touchdowns and rushing for 133 yards and five touchdowns on 25 carries. Following the end of the season, he entered the NCAA transfer portal.

=== Oklahoma ===
Bauer transferred to Oklahoma. He entered his first season with the Sooners as the team's starting tight end.

On December 7, 2024, Sharp announced that he would enter the transfer portal for the second time.

=== LSU ===
On December 13, 2024, Sharp announced that he would transfer to LSU.

== Professional career ==
Pre-draft measurables
Height	Weight	Arm length	Hand span	Wingspan	40-yard dash	10-yard split	20-yard split	20-yard shuttle	Three-cone drill	Vertical jump	Broad jump	Bench press
6 ft 4 5/8 in (1.95 m)	249 lb (113 kg)	31 3/4 in (0.81 m)	9 3/4 in (0.25 m)	6 ft 5 in (1.96 m)	4.63 s	1.68 s	2.73 s	4.30 s	7.05 s	35.0 in (0.89 m)	10 ft 0 in (3.05 m)	20 reps
All values from NFL Combine/Pro Day

Sharp was selected by the Tampa Bay Buccaneers in the 6th round with the 185th overall pick of the 2026 NFL Draft.
