= Dothan Opera House =

- U.S. National Register of Historic Places
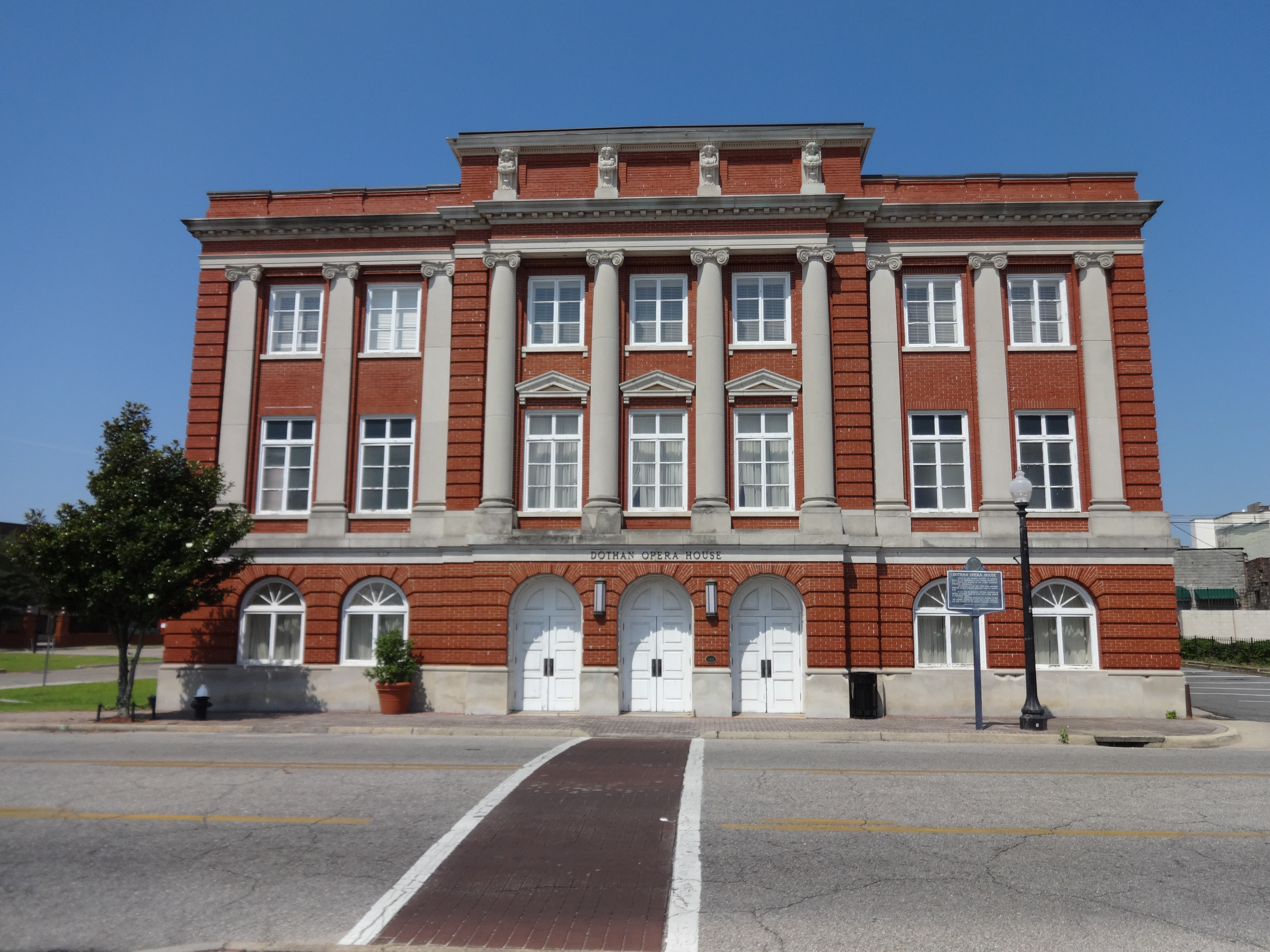

- Location within Alabama Location within the United States
- Location: 103 N. St. Andrews St., Dothan, Alabama
- Coordinates: 31°13′26″N 85°23′29″W
- Area: 0.2 acres (0.081 ha)
- Built: 1915
- Architect: Morris & Morris
- Architectural style: Classical Revival, Italian Renaissance
- NRHP reference No.: 77000204
- Added to NRHP: December 16, 1977

The Dothan Opera House is a historic performing arts venue in Dothan, Alabama, United States. It was built in 1914–15 as a municipal auditorium by the growing town. Seating 800, it opened October 8, 1915, with a performance by a local orchestra. The building was designed by Atlanta architectural firm Morris & Morris in a blend of Classical Revival and Italianate styles. The first floor features three central arched entry doors, with a pair of arched windows on either side. The second story is dominated by Ionic pilasters, four in the center section, and three on each side. The pilasters support a limestone architrave beneath a denticulated cornice and parapet roof. On the parapet, in line with each column in the center section is a figurine of an opera singer. A mural painted on the backdrop of the stage depicts the building under construction and some of the more famous acts to have performed in the theater.

A new civic center was built across the street in 1971, and the opera house was refurbished at the same time. The building was listed on the National Register of Historic Places in 1977.
