= Mal Moore =

American football player, coach, and athletics administrator (1939–2013)

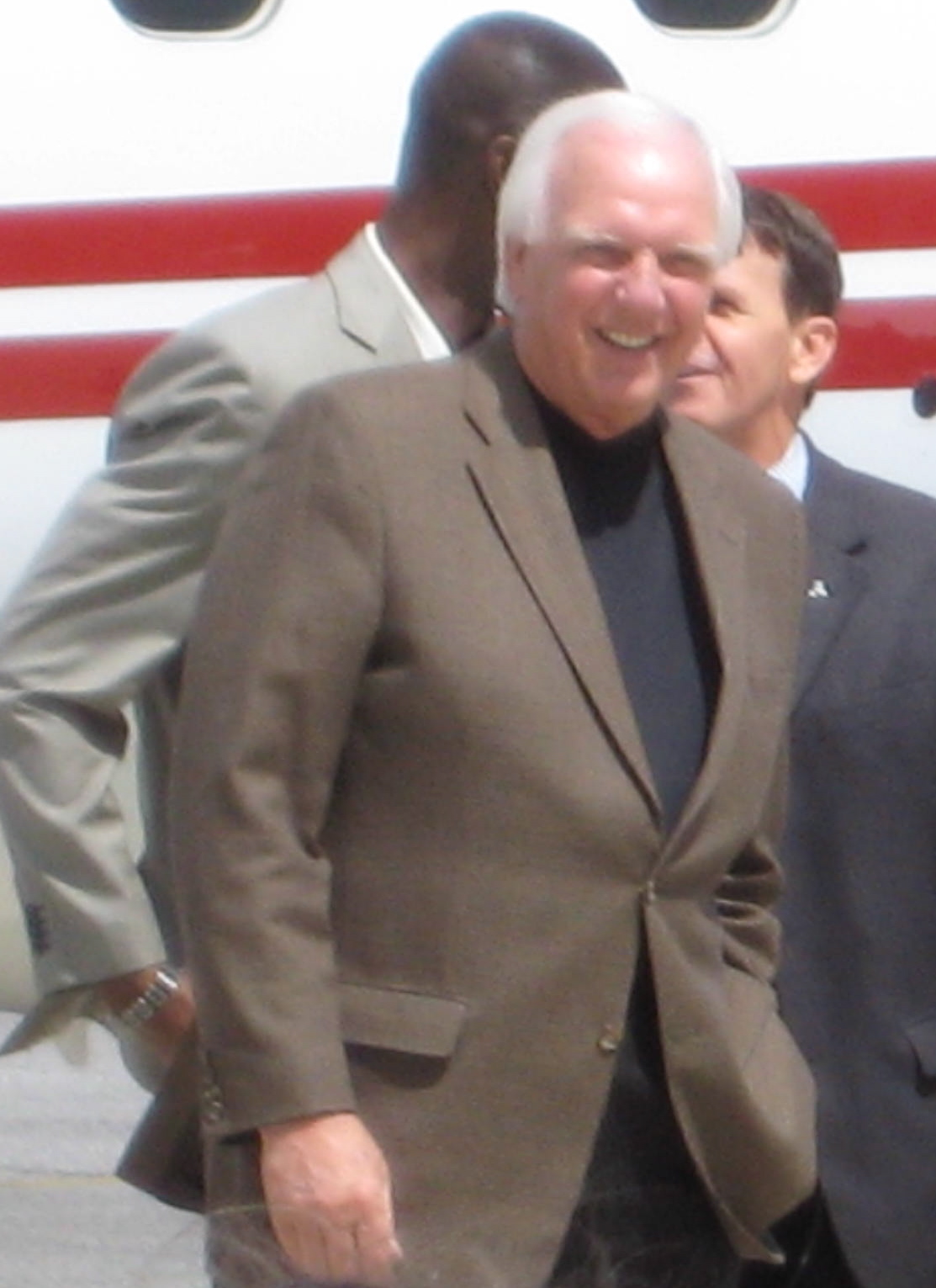

Biographical details
- Born: December 19, 1939; Dozier, Alabama, U.S.
- Died: March 30, 2013 (aged 73); Durham, North Carolina, U.S.

Playing career
- 1958–1962: Alabama
- Position: Quarterback

Coaching career (HC unless noted)
- 1963: Montana State (assistant)
- 1964: Alabama (GA)
- 1965–1970: Alabama (DB)
- 1971–1974: Alabama (QB)
- 1975–1982: Alabama (OC/QB)
- 1983–1985: Notre Dame (RB)
- 1986–1989: St. Louis/Phoenix Cardinals (assistant)
- 1990–1993: Alabama (OC/QB)

Administrative career (AD unless noted)
- 1994–1999: Alabama (Assistant AD)
- 1999–2013: Alabama

Accomplishments and honors

Championships
- National (1961)

Mal Mathad Moore (December 19, 1939 – March 30, 2013) was an American football coach and college athletics administrator. He served as the athletic director at the University of Alabama from 1999 to 2013. On November 23, 1999, he was hired as athletic director after spending almost thirty years in other areas with the university. As a player, coach, and director of athletics, Moore was part of ten national championship football teams. In May 2012, he was inducted into the Alabama Sports Hall of Fame. Moore died March 30, 2013, in Durham, North Carolina.

== Early years and education ==
One of seven children, Moore was born December 19, 1939, in Dozier, Alabama, the son of Dempsey Clark Moore (1895–1970) and Fannie Bozeman Moore (1905–2000). As a scholarship player from 1958 to 1962, Moore played as a career backup quarterback for legendary coach Bear Bryant, behind Pat Trammell and subsequently Joe Namath. During his college career at Alabama, Moore earned his bachelor's degree in sociology in 1963 and his master's degree in secondary education in 1964. After he earned his master's degree, at Coach Bryant's suggestion, he joined the Alabama Air National Guard.

== Coaching career ==
During a coaching career that spanned 31 years, Moore spent 22 of those at Alabama, with stops at Montana State, Notre Dame, and the NFL's St. Louis and Phoenix Cardinals. At Alabama, Moore began as Bryant's graduate assistant in 1964, then as defensive backfield coach for six seasons (1965–70) before becoming quarterbacks coach from 1971 to 1982 and serving as the Tide's offensive coordinator starting in 1975.

Moore was instrumental in the installation and implementation of the wishbone offense at Alabama prior to the 1971 season. The move to the wishbone led to an unprecedented decade of success for Bryant and the Crimson Tide. During the wishbone era, Alabama set school records that still stand for yards gained per game (480.7 in 1973), rushing attempts in a season (763 in 1979), rushing yards gained in a season (4,027 in 1973), rushing yards per game for a season (366.1 in 1973), yards per rush for a season (6.06 in 1973), rushing touchdowns (43 in 1973), passing yards per attempt for a season (13.4 in 1973), fewest punts in a season (39 in 1973), rushing first downs in a season (213 in 1979), total offense in a game (833 vs. Virginia Tech in 1973) and rushing yards in a game (748 vs. Virginia Tech in 1973). Moore returned as offensive coordinator under Gene Stallings from 1990 to 1993 before moving into athletic administration.

== Athletic director ==
In 1994, because of his wife's illness, Moore left coaching and moved into the UA Athletic Department. Mal Moore's style as director of athletics from 1999 to 2013 was welcomed by the university community and by his employees.

After building a reputation as an assistant football coach at Alabama, Notre Dame, and in the National Football League, Moore's success as an athletics administrator was largely personal, as he dealt with issues and initiatives that required the cooperation of numerous campus and statewide entities.

After an exhaustive search by the UA Board of Trustees, Moore took over as athletic director in 1999. Moore participated in the hiring of four head football coaches, including Dennis Franchione, Mike Price, Mike Shula, and Nick Saban. He also oversaw various facility improvements: Bryant–Denny Stadium expanded to its current capacity of over 101,000 seats, renovations were made to Coleman Coliseum in 2005, as well as new tennis, soccer, and softball stadiums.

The University of Alabama's director of athletics from 1999 to 2013, Moore was a football player under legendary Crimson Tide head coach Paul W. “Bear” Bryant from 1958 to 1962 and went on to serve as an assistant football coach on Bryant's staff. Moore was part of ten national championship teams as a player, coach, and athletics director (1961, 1964, 1965, 1973, 1978, 1979, 1992, 2009, 2011 and 2012), 16 SEC championships, and 39 bowl trips. He was part of ten national football championship teams as a player, coach, or athletics director.

As director of athletics, Moore oversaw the athletic department during a period of athletic and academic development, leading the department during a period that included athletic achievements and changes in academic performance measures. Moore stated that he sought to make Alabama's athletic programs nationally competitive across all sports. During his tenure, Alabama expanded and renovated athletic facilities across multiple sports.

During Moore's tenure as director of athletics, Alabama produced national championship teams in football, gymnastics, softball, men's golf and women's golf as well as Southeastern Conference championships in football, basketball, baseball, gymnastics, men's and women's golf, men's cross country and softball. Alabama athletes received SEC and NCAA honors, including SEC Athlete of the Year, SEC Scholar-Athlete of the Year, and NCAA Sportsperson of the Year awards. During Moore's tenure, Alabama reported improvements in scholarship-athlete graduation rates and had more than 62 Academic All-Americans. During Moore's tenure, Alabama produced 19 NCAA Post Graduate Scholarship winners, 11 NCAA Top VIII selections, three NCAA Woman of the Year finalists, two Campbell Trophy finalists, a Campbell Trophy winner, and a Wuerffel Award winner. In 2011, the Alabama Football team received the Disney Spirit Award for community service.

Moore directed more than $240 million of capital improvements to University of Alabama athletic facilities. Those projects encompassed facilities used by multiple Crimson Tide athletic programs and affected Alabama student-athletes, coaches, and administrators. Throughout his administrative career, Moore worked with a diversified field of constituents, from fellow coaches and former players, to fans and the business community. All of those experiences and relationships – in addition to his ability to unify those many constituents – made him uniquely qualified to lead Alabama athletics in the 21st century.

Moore's long association with the University of Alabama was recognized on March 28, 2007, when the Board of Trustees officially dedicated the facility formerly known as The Football Building as the Mal M. Moore Athletic Facility.

In 2011, he was elected to the State of Alabama Sports Hall of Fame for his accomplishments as a coach and an administrator. After the completion of the 2011–12 academic and athletic seasons, Moore was named the winner of the John L. Toner Award, given to the nation's best athletic director. In 2012, the City of Tuscaloosa honored him and his late wife Charlotte by naming the new Caring Days program the Mal and Charlotte Moore Center, a facility that serves as a day program for adults with Alzheimer's and other memory disorders.

== Personal life ==
Moore married Charlotte Moore (née Davis) on July 20, 1968, and had one daughter, Heather, during their marriage. His wife died on January 18, 2010, after battling with Alzheimer's since 1990. On March 30, 2013, Moore died at Duke University Medical Center in Durham, North Carolina, of pulmonary problems at the age of 73.
