= WQLS =

Camden, Alabama; United States
- Broadcast area: Wilcox County, Alabama
- Frequency: 90.5 MHz

Programming
- Language: English
- Format: Defunct

Ownership
- Owner: Wilcox Broadcast Communications, LLC.

History
- First air date: 2012

Technical information
- Licensing authority: FCC
- Facility ID: 171526
- Class: A
- ERP: 400 watts
- HAAT: 128 meters (420 ft)
- Transmitter coordinates: 31°57′34″N 87°16′04″W

Links
- Public license information: Public file; LMS

WQLS (90.5 FM) was an American non-commercial educational radio station licensed to serve the community of Camden, Alabama. The station's broadcast license is held by Wilcox Broadcast Communications, LLC.

== Programming ==
WQLS broadcast an Urban Contemporary, Blues, Soul, Gospel and Talk format to the greater Wilcox County, Alabama, area.

== History ==
In October 2007, Ken Layton's TBTA Ministries applied to the Federal Communications Commission (FCC) for a construction permit for a new broadcast radio station. The FCC granted this permit on December 17, 2008, with a scheduled expiration date of December 17, 2011. The new station was assigned call sign "WQLS" on August 25, 2010.

With station construction yet to begin in May 2009, TBTA Ministries contracted to sell the permit for this station to Jimmy Jarrell's Alabama Christian Radio, Inc. The deal also included the permit for WXIV in Lumpkin, Georgia, plus the permits to build three other radio stations in Georgia and Alabama for a total purchase price of $1. The FCC approved the deal on July 16, 2009, and the transaction was formally consummated on September 1, 2009.

After construction and testing were completed in December 2011, the station was granted its broadcast license on January 6, 2012.

On January 20, 2012, Alabama Christian Radio, Inc., contracted to sell WQLS and sister station WTBT (later WVPL, 90.5 FM, Dozier, Alabama) to Timothy Townsend's Townsend Broadcasting Enterprise for a combined sale price of $3,000. The FCC accepted the application for assignment of these permits on February 14, 2012, and granted the assignment on April 16, 2012.

Effective July 6, 2016, Townsend Broadcasting sold WQLS to Wilcox Broadcast Communications, LLC for $2,800.

WQLS's license was cancelled by the FCC on April 2, 2020, due to the station failing to file an application for license renewal by April 1.
