= Porter Hardware =

Porter Hardware, the oldest continually operating hardware store in the state of Alabama, was opened in 1889 by Edwin Russell Porter and Joel Murphree in the city of Dothan and is still operated today by Mr. Porter's descendants. The interior and exterior of Porter Hardware remains virtually unaltered and it maintains a large inventory of hardware and hard-to-find items.

== History ==
Mr. Porter bought the lot on East Main Street in Dothan, Alabama for $300 and built the E.R. Porter Hardware building. Mr. Murphree sold his interest in the hardware to Mr. Porter a few years later and moved back to Troy, Alabama. Porter Hardware has remained in the Porter family ever since. Mr. Porter died in 1944, and it was his desire that the hardware store continue to retain its original appearance. Since that time, everything except the type of inventory has remained the same. Porter Hardware is currently owned by Mr. Porter's daughter, Jane Porter Thrower and is managed by his granddaughter, Jane Thrower II. His great-grandson E.R. Conaway is also employed at Porter Hardware.

== The Hardware ==
One of the city of Dothan's first rope elevators made by the Otis Elevator company is installed at Porter Hardware; the elevator was made in the 1880s. Porter Hardware has its original embossed tin ceilings, but part of the flooring was replaced in the 1940s. The sliding ladders located on the side aisles of the store are still used to get hard to reach items.

== The Office ==
The office of Porter Hardware has an antique safe and a vault with an ornately decorated door. There are pictures of the founder Mr. Porter and one of his managers H.T. Scarborough who helped manage Porter Hardware for 60 years until his retirement in 1976. There is also a picture of the store taken in the 1950s showing the small degree of which the store has changed. A local saying around the older community of Dothan is, "if Porter Hardware doesn't have it, it's not in town!"

== Redevelopment ==
The store closed in 2014 and reopened as a museum in 2018.
