= Billy Gilmore =

American songwriter

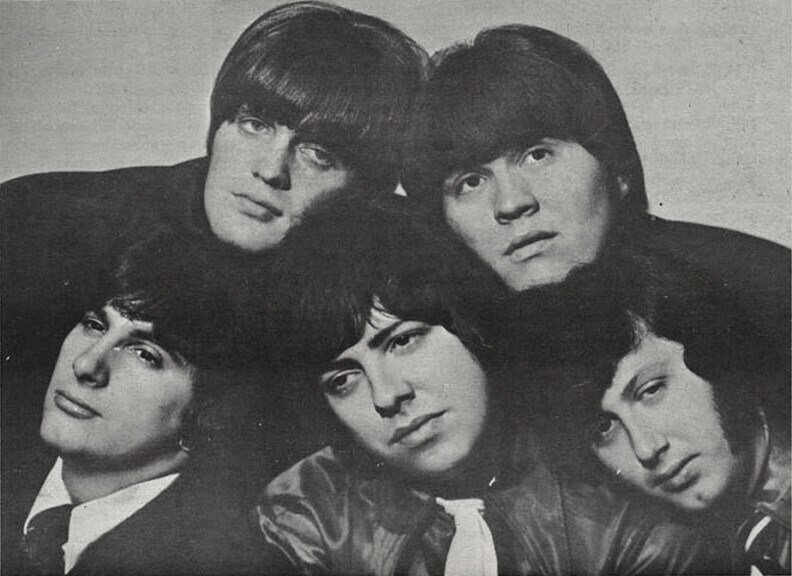
The Candymen c. late 1967. Clockwise from top left: Dean Daughtry, Robert Nix, Billy Gilmore, John Rainey Adkins, Rodney Justo

William Gilmore, also known as Bill, Billy, and Shakin' Bill (because he stood still onstage) was an American musician who played the bass and the keyboard. He grew up in Sarasota, Florida before settling down in Atlanta, Georgia. He played with The Webs, The Candymen, The Classics IV, and the Atlanta Rhythm Section.

Gilmore first came to attention around 1965, touring as a bass player for Roy Orbison and The Candymen.

Gilmore was featured on "Oh, Pretty Woman" by Roy Orbison and The Candymen in 1964. He also co-wrote "Party Girl" for Tommy Roe along with Buddy Buie, and also penned tracks for Jay & The Americans.

He died on March 27, 1978, and was survived by wife Andrea and three daughters.
