= WOOF-FM =

- Dothan, Alabama; United States
- Frequency: 99.7 MHz
- Branding: 99-7 WOOF-FM

Programming
- Format: Adult contemporary

Ownership
- Owner: WOOF, Inc.
- Sister stations: WOOF

History
- First air date: September 1964

Technical information
- Licensing authority: FCC
- Facility ID: 73674
- Class: C1
- ERP: 100,000 watts
- HAAT: 299 meters (981 ft)
- Transmitter coordinates: 31°15′07″N 85°17′12″W

Links
- Public license information: Public file; LMS
- Webcast: Listen live
- Website: 997wooffm.com

WOOF-FM (99.7 FM, "99-7 WOOF-FM") is a radio station licensed to serve Dothan, Alabama, United States. The station, established in September 1964, is owned by WOOF, Inc. WOOF-FM is a sister station of WOOF (AM) 560.

The station's signal originates from a 1,021-foot (311 m) tower 2 miles (3.2 km) east of Dothan and reaches Southeast Alabama, Southwest Georgia, and Northwest Florida. This Webb, Alabama, site has been operational since 1985. A studio backup in Dothan, Alabama, has 50,000 watts on a 320-foot (98 m) tower. WOOF-FM is responsible for the activation of the Emergency Alert System for the 9th area in Alabama.

== Programming ==
WOOF-FM broadcasts an adult contemporary format.
