= WARB =

- Dothan, Alabama; United States
- Frequency: 700 kHz C-QUAM AM stereo
- Branding: V105.9

Programming
- Format: Urban contemporary
- Affiliations: Compass Media Networks

Ownership
- Owner: Brian Baker and Anthony Donelson; (Good Guys Broadcasting, LLC)

History
- First air date: 1996 (as WGZS)
- Former call signs: WGZS (1990–2007); WEEL (2007–2010); WCNF (2010–2018)

Technical information
- Licensing authority: FCC
- Facility ID: 23614
- Class: D
- Power: 1,600 watts day
- Transmitter coordinates: 31°26′19″N 85°17′22″W
- Translator: 105.9 W290DG (Dothan)

Links
- Public license information: Public file; LMS
- Website: www.myv105.com

WARB (700 AM) is a radio station licensed to serve Dothan, Alabama, United States. The station, which began licensed operation in 1996, is owned by Brian Baker and Anthony Donelson, through licensee Good Guys Broadcasting, LLC. The station is licensed to broadcast only during daylight hours.

700 AM is a United States clear-channel frequency, on which WLW in Cincinnati is the dominant Class A station. WARB must leave the air during the period from sunset to sunrise in order to prevent interference to the nighttime skywave signal of WLW.

== Programming ==
Since November 2011, WARB has aired a mix of conservative talk radio, sports, news, and agricultural information branded as "700 The Farm". Weekday programming includes a morning drive sports talk show co-hosted by Alabama Crimson Tide football play-by-play announcer Eli Gold and Auburn Tigers football color analyst Stan White broadcast from WZNN in Birmingham. Conservative talk host Neal Boortz airs in mid-days from WSB in Atlanta via Dial Global. Conservative talk host Mike Gallagher from Salem Radio Network airs weekday afternoons. Other weekday programming includes news, weather, market reports, commentary, and The Afternoon AG Review.

Weekend programming included talk shows hosted by Dennis Prager, Steve Gill, and Hugh Hewitt, plus Outdoors with Alan Warren and Viewpoint Alabama. The station signs off at sunset each night to protect WLW at Cincinnati, Ohio, and KBYR at Anchorage, Alaska, from skywave interference.

== History ==
=== Launch ===
In response to an application filed in September 1986 by Holy Ground Broadcasting, Inc., the Federal Communications Commission (FCC) issued a construction permit for a new radio station on 700 kHz with 5,000 watts of power on February 21, 1990. The station would be allowed to operate only during daylight hours to protect the clear channel signal of WLW in Cincinnati, Ohio.

The new station was assigned call sign WGZS on March 14, 1990. After a renewal, an extension, and a reinstatement, the construction permit and the unfinished station were sold to Genesis Radio Company, Inc., in July 1994. The FCC approved the deal on September 30, 1994, and the transaction was consummated on October 21, 1994. In April 1995, the FCC authorized the still-under construction station to move its transmitter location and reduce its power output to 1,600 watts.

Finally, six years after the original construction permit was granted and more than a decade after the initial application was filed, WGZS received its broadcast license on October 31, 1996.

=== WGZS era ===
In July 1996, Genesis Radio Company reached a deal to sell WGZS to Willis Broadcasting through their Dothan Christian Radio, Inc., subsidiary for a reported $65,000. The deal gained FCC approval on October 31, 1996, but the transaction was never consummated. Genesis Radio Company tried a second time to sell the now-operational WGZS, this time to Celebration Communications Company, Inc., in April 1998. The FCC approved the deal on June 30, 1998, and the transaction was consummated on July 22, 1998.

Celebration Communications Company in turn reached an agreement to sell WGZS to Satellite Radio Network president Michael B. Glinter in October 2001. The FCC approved the deal on April 16, 2002, and the transaction was consummated on July 1, 2002. The station's format shifted to Contemporary Christian music.

Glinter agreed to sell WGZS to James T. Lee in July 2002 and the deal gained FCC approval on September 13, 2002. However, the station fell silent on October 14, 2002, for "technical" reasons and the transaction was never consummated. In August 2003, with the station still off the air, Glinter made a deal to sell the station to Good Samaritan Communications of Pioche, Inc. (Michael Augustus, president), for $165,000. The deal was approved by the FCC on October 7, 2003, with a "silent condition" and the transaction was consummated on October 24, 2003.

In December 2004, Good Samaritan Communications of Pioche signed a contract to sell WGZS to Tropicana Media, LLC, for $135,000. The deal was approved by the FCC on March 24, 2005, and the transaction was consummated on April 6, 2005. At the time of the sale, the station broadcast a soft rock music format.

This ownership would prove short-lived as in December 2005, Tropicana Media made a deal to sell the station and transfer the broadcast license to Victory Broadcasting Company, LLC, for a total of $151,000. The deal was approved by the FCC on February 24, 2006, and the transaction was successfully consummated on March 29, 2006.

=== WEEL era ===
WGZS, which had been dark since October 3, 2006, was purchased in late 2006 from Victory Broadcasting Company by broadcasters Jack and Lois "Lovey" Gale, doing business as Jalo Broadcasting Corporation, for $225,000. WGZS switched its call sign to WEEL on February 20, 2007, a couple of days earlier than planned. Gale launched an oldies music format known by the branding "Oldies 700, The Big Wheel" on that frequency on March 1, 2007, at 5:45 a.m. Gale hosted the station's morning show from 6 a.m. to 9 a.m. Afterward, Kevin Larkin hosted from 9 a.m. to 2 p.m., followed by Chris Morgan from 2 p.m. to 7 p.m. The trio used the collective name "The Good Guys" on-air.

On August 3, 2007, WEEL's broadcast signal and webstream fell silent. The reason listed on the FCC "Remain Silent Authority" application was "financial". On January 30, 2008, the station applied for an extension to the remain silent authority, still citing financial problems, with a statement that they expect to resume operations in 60 days, but no specifics were mentioned as to how the station was going to solve its financial problems. The station returned to the air on May 5, 2008, but this would last just 10 days.

=== On and off ===
Following another period of silence beginning on May 15, WEEL returned to the air on August 1, 2008. The station resumed its format of oldies music. In addition, Jalo Broadcasting acquired an FM translator on 100.1 MHz (W261AT) allowing WEEL to provide 24/7 service to its city of license.

In April 2008, Jalo Broadcasting Corp. reached an agreement to sell WEEL to Dothan Broadcasting, Inc., for just under $250,000. The deal was approved on June 9, 2008, and the prospective owners were operating the station under a local marketing agreement but the transaction was ultimately not consummated and the station license and assets stayed with Jalo Broadcasting Corp.

On July 25, 2008, Jalo Broadcasting signed an option to sell WEEL and its translator to veteran broadcaster Bob Mathers. Mathers resigned his position as anchor and editor for KOMO (1000 AM, "Newsradio") in Seattle to take over WEEL operations on September 2, 2008. Mathers also handled morning drive and Dothan radio veteran Tom O'Brien was operations manager. The station promoted itself as "Oldies Radio, The Wheel".

The station fell silent again on August 3, 2009, again citing "financial" reasons. The FCC granted the station temporary authority to remain silent on January 7, 2010. WEEL, formerly simulcasting in Dothan on its translator frequency 100.1 FM 24 hours a day, sold its translator (W261AT) to WOOF in late January 2010.

In November 2009, Jalo Broadcasting Corp. filed an application with the FCC to transfer the WEEL broadcast license back to Victory Broadcasting Company, LLC, in exchange for forgiveness of certain debts and other considerations. The FCC approved the deal on January 11, 2010, and the transaction was consummated on February 18, 2010.

=== WCNF era ===
Under the resumed ownership by Victory Broadcasting Company, the station changed call signs once again on March 2, 2010, this time to WCNF. The station, silent since August 2009, returned to the air on July 6, 2010, with a Christian radio format as "Praise 700". The station fell silent again on October 6, 2010, citing "financial concerns". The FCC granted the station temporary authority to remain silent on December 7, 2010, with a scheduled expiration date of June 7, 2011. In January 2011, WCNF was listed with CMS Station Brokerage as "for sale" and "priced to sell quickly". The station, while dark, changed its branding to "Gem AM".

In late May 2011, Victory Broadcasting Corporation, LLC, contracted to sell WCNF to James Ricky Carter's Alarado Media, LLC. The FCC approved the sale on July 12, 2011, and the transaction was formally consummated on July 14, 2011. The station resumed regular broadcast operations on September 11, 2011. In November 2011, the station began airing a mix of sports talk, news, conservative talk, and agricultural information branded as "700 The Farm".

As of February 2015, WCNF began airing a gospel format, branded as "Praise 700".

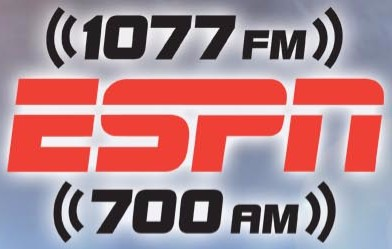
Logo as "ESPN 107.7"

Sometime during 2016, WCNF flipped to sports talk as "ESPN 107.7", reflecting its simulcast on FM translator W299BX (107.7 FM).

=== WARB era ===
On February 12, 2018, WCNF changed its call sign to WARB. On April 1, 2018, WARB's format changed from sports to classic rock and blues, branded as "Roadhouse 106" in reflection of its simulcast on translator W290DG (105.9 FM).

In January 2019, WARB returned to the air (after going off the air in October 2018 due to Hurricane Michael) with an urban contemporary format, branded as "Vibe 105.9".

Effective January 23, 2022, Alarado Media sold WARB and translator W290DG to Good Guys Broadcasting, LLC for $32,500.
