= Dothan Preparatory Academy =

Coordinates: 31.20872°N 85.39436°W

Dothan High School
- 1236 South Oates Street; Dothan, Alabama 36301; United States

Information
- Type: Public middle school
- Established: 1911 (115 years ago)
- School district: Dothan City Schools
- CEEB code: 010910
- Principal: Stan Eldridge
- Enrollment: 1,459 (2023-2024)
- Colors: Red and black
- Mascot: Wolf
- Nickname: Wolves
- Yearbook: The Gargoyle
- Website: dothanprep.dothan.k12.al.us

Dothan Preparatory Academy is located in Dothan, Alabama, United States. It is located on U.S. Highway 231 inside Ross Clark Circle, about 1.5 miles (2.4 km) north of the southern tip of Ross Clark Circle. The high school district roughly runs down U.S. Highway 84, which runs east to west through the heart of Dothan.

== History ==
Dothan High School was built in 1911 for the education of white students and was originally located on Burdeshaw Street. It was one of the most modern high schools in the state. When this school opened, the state required only three years of high school, but Dothan High went to a four-year curriculum in 1912. The George S. Houston Memorial Library is now on the former site of the Burdeshaw Street building. In 1942 this building was torn down and an elementary school was built on the site and named for Minnie T. Heard. The central section of the existing Dothan High facility on South Oates Street was built in 1939. Numerous additions have been made at various points through the years since, such that DHS has a full cafeteria, separate auditorium, and two full gymnasiums, with an additional gymnasium at the adjacent Doug Tew Recreation Center.

For most of the school's history, only whites were allowed to attend. Some black students were admitted under a choice program started in 1963. In the summer of 1969 a federal court ordered immediate integration of the schools. In the fall of 1969, students from the black school, Carver, were transferred to Dothan. A judge removed the segregation consent decree in 2008, although it was noted that only 7 percent of teachers were black, a decrease from 11 percent when the decree was implemented and less than the 18 percent blacks made of the total population.

=== Sports ===
Dothan High fields 11 varsity teams, including football, baseball, softball, basketball, soccer, tennis, track, cross country, volleyball, golf and cheerleading teams.

== Notable alumni ==
- Larry Brackins, American football wide receiver
- Johnny Mack Brown, American football halfback, Actor
- Richmond Flowers, Sr., Attorney General of Alabama, 1963–1967
- Steadman S. Shealy, American football quarterback, Attorney
