= WOOF (AM) =

- Dothan, Alabama; United States
- Broadcast area: Dothan, Alabama
- Frequency: 560 kHz
- Branding: The Ball

Programming
- Format: Sports
- Affiliations: Fox Sports Radio

Ownership
- Owner: WOOF, Inc.
- Sister stations: WOOF-FM

History
- First air date: February 17, 1948

Technical information
- Licensing authority: FCC
- Facility ID: 73675
- Class: D
- Power: 5,000 watts (day); 118 watts (night)
- Transmitter coordinates: 31°13′05″N 85°21′10″W
- Translators: 100.1 W261AT (Dothan); 107.1 W296DQ (Dothan)

Links
- Public license information: Public file; LMS
- Webcast: Listen live

WOOF (560 kHz) is an AM radio station licensed to serve Dothan, Alabama, United States. The station is owned by WOOF, Inc.

WOOF broadcasts a sports talk format. The station features locally produced live call in shows, high school play by play, Troy Trojans football and syndicated programming from Paul Finebaum and Fox Sports Radio. The station began airing Fox Sports just before July 4, 2016. In late January 2010, WOOF, Inc. purchased the 100.1 translator (W261AT), which was previously relaying WEEL (700 AM).
