= WBBK (AM) =

Blakely, Georgia; United States
- Frequency: 1260 kHz

Programming
- Format: Defunct

Ownership
- Owner: Flint Media, Inc.

History
- First air date: 1959
- Last air date: July 28, 2011

Technical information
- Facility ID: 41206
- Class: D
- Power: 1,000 watts day
- Transmitter coordinates: 31°17′55.00″N 85°3′18.00″W

WBBK (1260 AM) was a radio station licensed to Blakely, Georgia, United States. The station was owned by Flint Media, Inc.

The station's license was cancelled and its call sign deleted by the Federal Communications Commission on July 28, 2011.
