= WDAB (FM) =

- Slocomb, Alabama; United States
- Broadcast area: Dothan, Alabama
- Frequency: 100.5 MHz
- Branding: 100.5 The Bear

Programming
- Format: Mainstream rock

Ownership
- Owner: Robert Holladay; (Alabama Media, LLC)
- Sister stations: W299BX, WBBK-FM, WECB, WLDQ

History
- First air date: 1991 (as WXUS)
- Former call signs: WXUS (1991–2005); WLDA (2005–2013); WJRL-FM (2013-2025)
- Call sign meaning: Dothan, Alabama

Technical information
- Licensing authority: FCC
- Facility ID: 60591
- Class: C3
- ERP: 10,000 watts
- HAAT: 132.3 meters (434.1 feet)
- Transmitter coordinates: 31°11′33.6″N 85°24′42.8″W

Links
- Public license information: Public file; LMS
- Webcast: WDAB Webstream
- Website: WDAB Online

WDAB (100.5 FM, "100.5 The Bear") is an American radio station licensed to serve Slocomb, Alabama, United States. The station is owned by Robert Holladay and the license is held by Alabama Media, LLC.

It broadcasts a mainstream rock format to the Dothan, Alabama, area.

== History ==
This station received its original construction permit for a new FM station to serve Fort Rucker, Alabama, broadcasting with 3,000 watts of effective radiated power at 93.1 MHz from the Federal Communications Commission on December 5, 1990. This was soon changed to 100.5 MHz, per Docket #87-618. The new station was assigned the call letters WXUS by the FCC on January 18, 1991. WXUS received its license to cover from the FCC on February 28, 1992.

In May 2003, Skyway Broadcasting, Ltd., reached an agreement to sell this station to Styles Broadcasting subsidiary Styles Media Group, LLC (Thomas A. DiBacco, managing member) for a total sale price of $750,000. The deal was approved by the FCC on August 20, 2003, and the transaction was consummated on October 1, 2003. The new owners had the FCC change the station's callsign to WLDA on March 4, 2005.

On August 24, 2005, the FCC granted the station a construction permit to change its community of license to Slocomb, Alabama. In 2006, Styles Broadcasting became the Magic Broadcasting Company. WLDA received its license to cover this permit on August 25, 2008.

On August 5, 2009 at 5 p.m. local time, Star 100.5 changed formats while retaining its branding, transitioning to classic hits and billing itself as playing "The Greatest Hits of All-Time."

On December 20, 2011, WLDA changed their format to urban contemporary, branded as "100.5 The Beat".

On January 23, 2013, WLDA changed their format from urban contemporary to rock, branded as "Rock 100.5". On January 29, 2013, the station swapped call signs with sister station WJRL-FM, taking on the current WJRL-FM call sign.

On April 16, 2025, WJRL-FM changed their call letters to WDAB and rebranded as "100.5 The Bear".
