= Dothan City Schools =

School district in Alabama

Address
- 1665 Honeysuckle Road Dothan, Alabama, 36301; United States

District information
- Type: Public
- Grades: PreK–12
- NCES District ID: 0101230

Students and staff
- Students: 8,031
- Teachers: 456.03
- Staff: 360.47
- Student–teacher ratio: 17.61

Other information
- Website: www.dothan.k12.al.us

Dothan City Schools is a school district in Houston County, Alabama. The district is governed by the Dothan City Board of Education. As of 2022, the system includes 9 elementary schools, 3 middle schools, 2 high schools (9th Grade Academy/10-12 Grade High School), an alternative school, and a technology center.

== Schools ==
=== High Schools ===
- Accelerated Recovery Center
- Dothan High School/Carver 9th Grade Academy
- Dothan Technology Center

=== Middle Schools ===
- Beverlye Intermediate School
- Dothan Preparatory Academy
- Girard Intermediate School

=== Elementary Schools ===
- Carver School for Math, Science & Technology
- Girard Elementary School
- Heard Elementary School
- Hidden Lake Primary School
- Highlands Elementary School
- Jerry Lee Faine Elementary School
- Kelly Springs Elementary School
- Morris Slingluff Elementary School
- Selma St. Elementary School
