= National Peanut Festival =

Celebration of peanut harvest season in the United States of America

Coordinates: 31.1468°N 85.4072°W

The National Peanut Festival (NPF) is held each fall in Dothan, Alabama, to honor peanut growers and to celebrate the harvest season. It is the largest peanut festival in the United States.

Established in 1938, the fairgrounds are located on Highway 231 South, three miles south of the Ross Clark Circle. The festivities include games and amusement rides on a large midway, animal acts, agricultural displays, an outdoor amphitheater with live music concerts by national recording artists, beauty pageants, arts and crafts displays, contests, food and a two-hour parade. The festival sponsors and holds field crop exhibits with prizes awarded to each exhibitor. The festival has other competitions, including sewing, cake decorating, photography, cooking, art, and who has grown the biggest peanut.

There was no festival between 1942 and 1946, as well as 2020 due to the COVID-19 pandemic. Instead, the carnival that hosted the festival went to the local mall and had some acts and performances.
