= Dozier, Alabama =

- Town
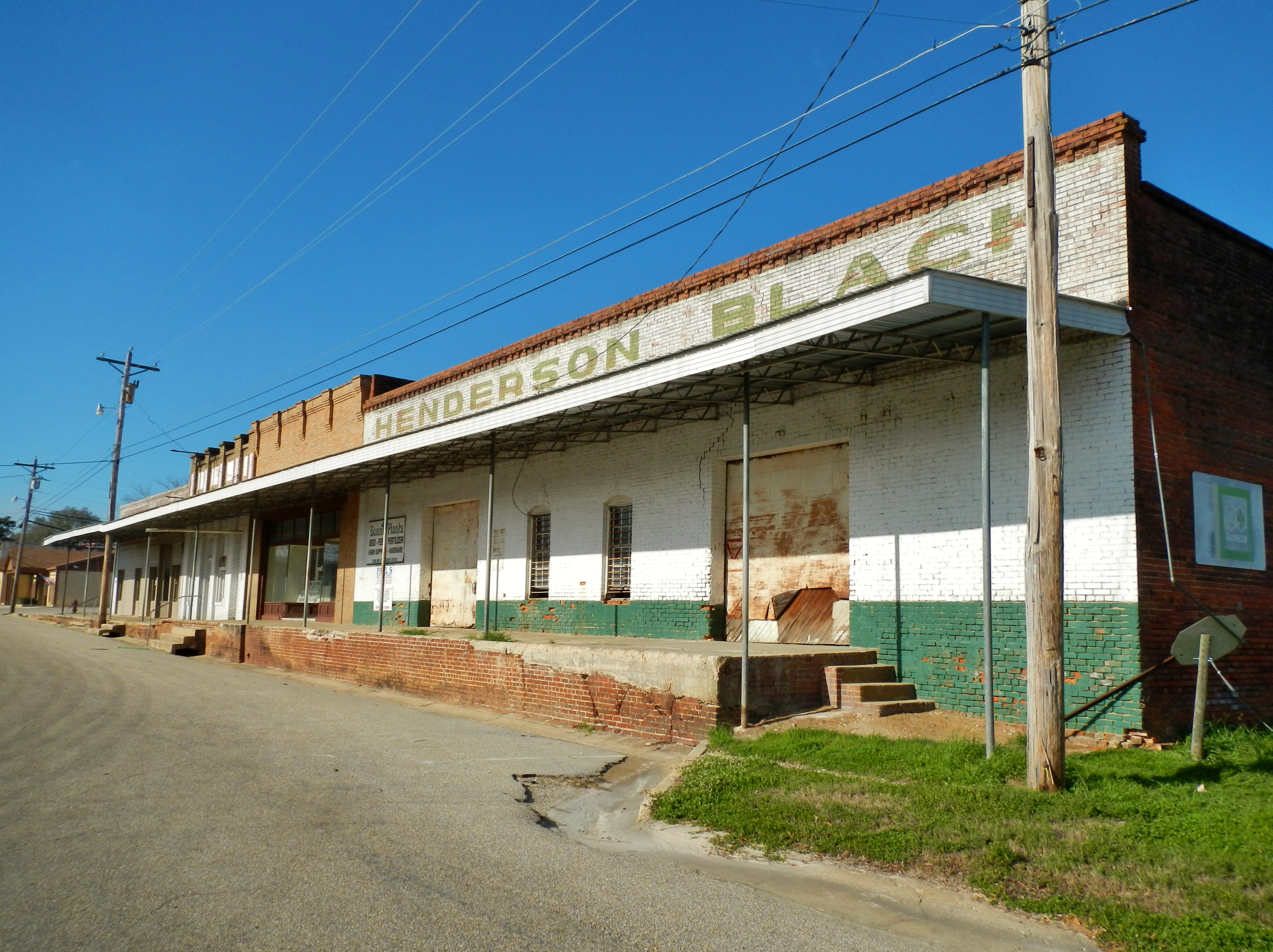
- Dozier in 2012

- Location of Dozier in Crenshaw County, Alabama.
- Coordinates: 31°29′42″N 86°21′59″W
- Country: United States
- State: Alabama
- County: Crenshaw

Area
  - Total: 2.96 sq mi (7.67 km^{2})
  - Land: 2.95 sq mi (7.64 km^{2})
  - Water: 0.012 sq mi (0.03 km^{2})
- Elevation: 240 ft (73 m)

Population (2020)
  - Total: 285
  - Density: 97/sq mi (37.3/km^{2})
- Time zone: UTC-6 (Central (CST))
  - Summer (DST): UTC-5 (CDT)
- ZIP code: 36028
- Area code: 334
- FIPS code: 01-21448
- GNIS feature ID: 0117451

Dozier /ˈdoʊʒər/ is a town in Crenshaw County, Alabama, United States. At the 2020 census, the population was 285. Dozier was incorporated in 1907.

== Geography ==
Dozier is located in southern Crenshaw County at 31°29′43″N 86°22′0″W (31.495233, −86.366592). Its southern border is the Conecuh River, which is also the Covington County line.

According to the U.S. Census Bureau, the town has a total area of 3.0 square miles (7.7 km^{2}), of which 0.012 square miles (0.03 km^{2}), or 0.40%, is water.

== Demographics ==
Historical population
Census	Pop.	Note	%±
1910	288		—
1920	237		−17.7%
1930	377		59.1%
1940	399		5.8%
1950	362		−9.3%
1960	335		−7.5%
1970	304		−9.3%
1980	494		62.5%
1990	483		−2.2%
2000	391		−19.0%
2010	329		−15.9%
2020	285		−13.4%
U.S. Decennial Census; 2013 Estimate

As of the census of 2000, there were 391 people, 167 households, and 106 families living in the town. The population density was 132.2 inhabitants per square mile (51.0/km^{2}). There were 196 housing units at an average density of 66.3 per square mile (25.6/km^{2}). The racial makeup of the town was 57.03% White, 39.64% Black or African American, 2.05% from other races, and 1.28% from two or more races. 1.28% of the population were Hispanic or Latino of any race.

Of the 167 households 34.1% had children under the age of 18 living with them, 26.3% were married couples living together, 31.7% had a female householder with no husband present, and 36.5% were non-families. 33.5% of households were one person and 16.2% were one person aged 65 or older. The average household size was 2.34 and the average family size was 2.92.

The age distribution was 31.2% under the age of 18, 6.4% from 18 to 24, 27.4% from 25 to 44, 18.9% from 45 to 64, and 16.1% 65 or older. The median age was 34 years. For every 100 females, there were 76.1 males. For every 100 females age 18 and over, there were 63.0 males.

The median household income was $13,750 and the median family income was $16,667. Males had a median income of $23,438 versus $18,750 for females. The per capita income for the town was $8,964. About 42.6% of families and 49.9% of the population were below the poverty line, including 76.1% of those under age 18 and 39.7% of those age 65 or over.

== Notable person ==
- Mal Moore, former American football player and athletic director for the University of Alabama

== Gallery ==
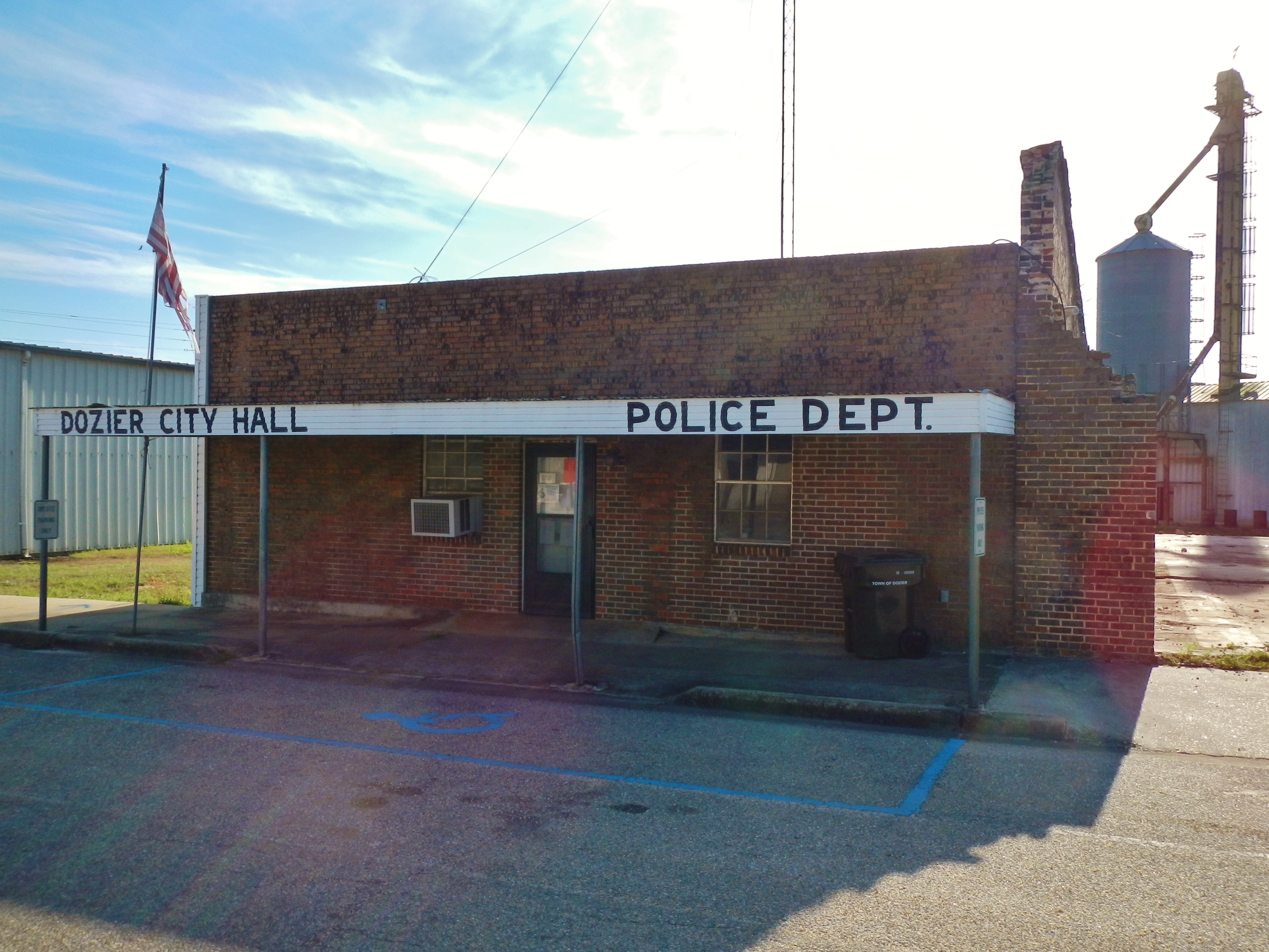
Dozier City Hall and Police Department

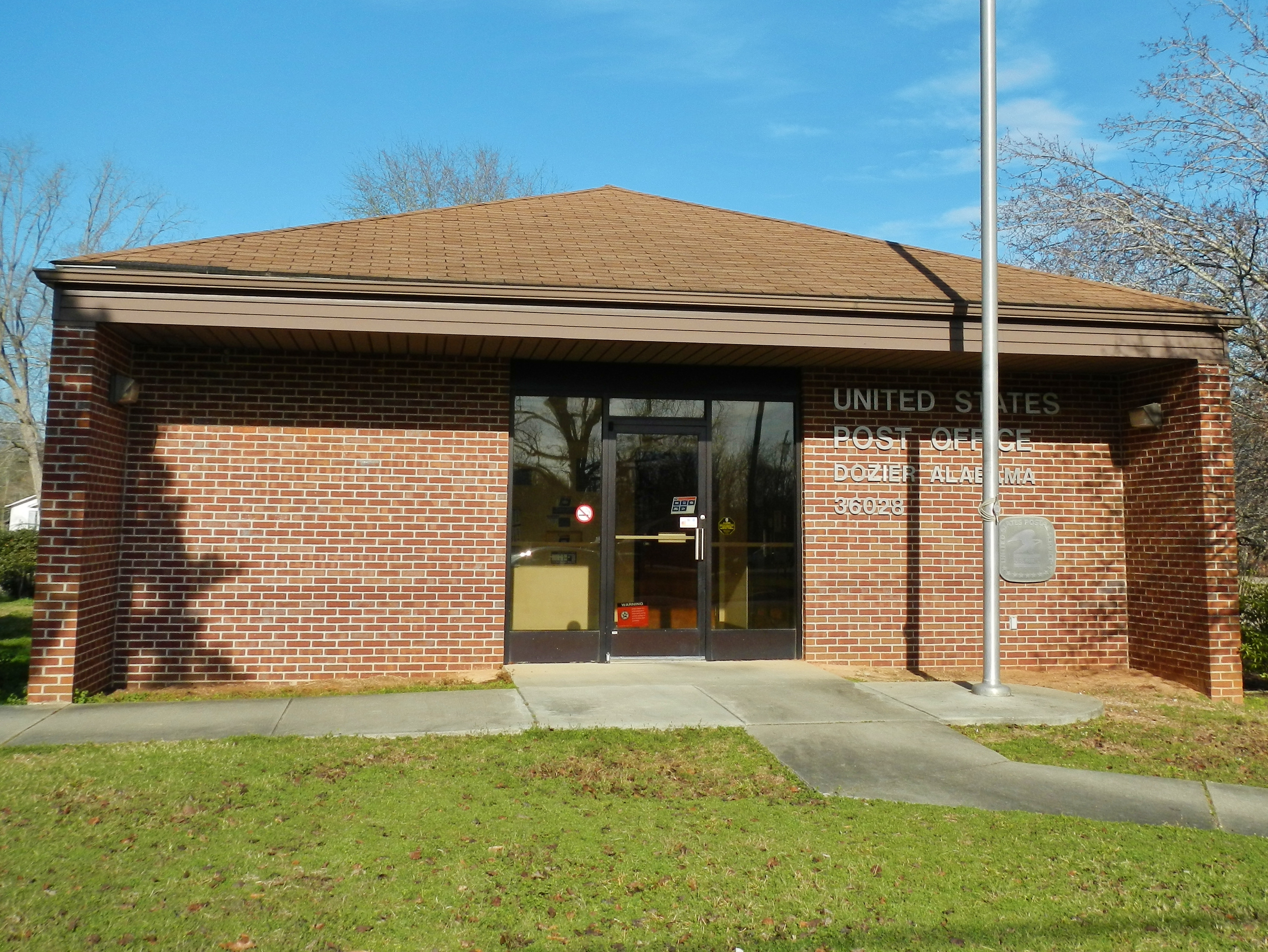
Dozier Post Office (ZIP code: 36028)

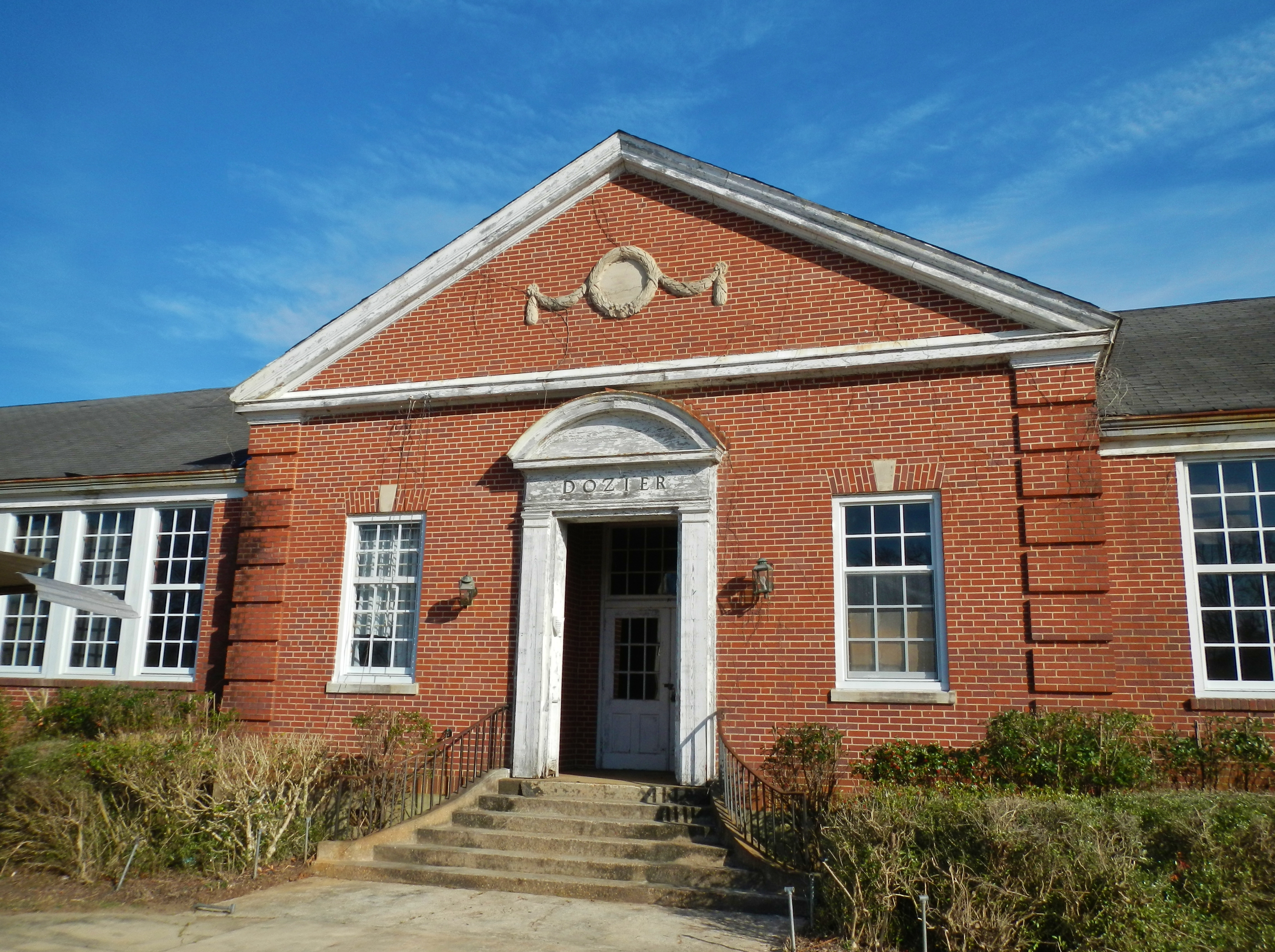
The old Dozier High School building
