= WLDQ =

- Dothan, Alabama; United States
- Broadcast area: Wiregrass Region
- Frequency: 102.5 MHz
- Branding: 102.5 The Q

Programming
- Format: Classic hits

Ownership
- Owner: Robert Holladay; (Alabama Media, LLC)
- Sister stations: WECB, WDAB

History
- First air date: 1990
- Former call signs: WESP (1990-2025)

Technical information
- Licensing authority: FCC
- Facility ID: 6891
- Class: C3
- ERP: 10,000 watts
- HAAT: 132.3 meters (434 ft)
- Transmitter coordinates: 31°15′48″N 85°18′24″W

Links
- Public license information: Public file; LMS
- Webcast: Listen live
- Website: 1025theq.com

WLDQ (102.5 FM, "The Q") is a radio station broadcasting a classic hits music format. Licensed to Dothan, Alabama, United States, the station serves the Wiregrass Region. The station is currently owned by Robert Holladay and licensed to Alabama Media, LLC.

== History ==
The station's original construction permit was granted by the Federal Communications Commission on June 23, 1989. The station was assigned the WESP call letters on June 3, 1989. WESP received its license to cover on August 27, 1990.

In June 1998, Broadcast Associates reached an agreement to sell WESP to Signal Enterprises, Inc. The FCC approved the deal on June 29, 1998, and the transaction was consummated on July 15, 1998.

In December 1998, Signal Enterprises reached an agreement to sell WESP to Gulf South Communications, Inc. The deal was valued at a reported $1.4 million. The FCC approved the deal on March 8, 1999, and the transaction was consummated on March 29, 1999.

In November 2011, the station was sold to Georgia Edminston's Southeast Alabama Broadcasters, LLC. Edminston, in turn, sold the station to Robert Holladay's Alabama Media, LLC effective December 5, 2012, at a purchase price of $1.2 million.

In November 2012, WESP rebranded from "102.5 The Eagle" to "Retro Radio Q102". In December 2012 WESP rebranded to "102.5 The Q".

On April 10, 2025, WESP changed their call letters to WLDQ, to match the "102.5 The Q" branding.
