= WPHH =

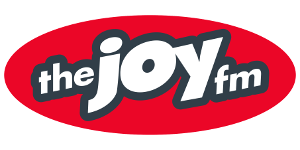
- Hope Hull, Alabama; United States
- Broadcast area: Montgomery, Alabama
- Frequency: 93.5 MHz
- Branding: The Joy FM

Programming
- Format: Contemporary Christian

Ownership
- Owner: Radio Training Network, Inc.

History
- First air date: September 12, 1969
- Former call signs: WGEA-FM (1969–1987); WRJM-FM (1987–2008); WUSD (2008–2011); WDBT (2011–2015); WLDA (2015–2016)
- Former frequencies: 93.7 MHz (1969–2015)

Technical information
- Licensing authority: FCC
- Facility ID: 62206
- Class: A
- ERP: 4,400 watts
- HAAT: 116.1 meters
- Transmitter coordinates: 31°2′42″N 85°57′33″W

Links
- Public license information: Public file; LMS
- Webcast: Listen live
- Website: www.thejoyfm.com

WPHH (93.5 FM) is an American Christian radio station licensed to serve the community of Hope Hull, Alabama, United States. The station broadcasts to the Montgomery area.

== History ==
The station license and operation was transferred to William C Carn, III as Trustee for Stage Door Development, Inc in February 2008 by the US Bankruptcy Court. The then-WRJM-FM was later sold to Gulf South Communication's The Radio People on September 8, 2008, who then swapped formats with new sister station WDBT.

The station had been broadcasting a News Talk Information format featuring programming from ABC Radio and Premiere Radio Networks prior to the switch. The long-time call sign "WRJM-FM" was changed to "WUSD" on August 28, 2008. WUSD was a country formatted station for most of its existence.

In January 2009, the station applied to the FCC for authorization to change its community of license from Geneva to Hartford, Alabama. This move became effective in July 2009.

On May 10, 2011, the station simulcast its sister station 105.3 FM, which carried a talk format at the time.

On December 23, 2011, the station changed its call sign to WDBT. WDBT continued to carry the news-talk format, while 105.3, now WECB, returned to a country format.

On October 12, 2015, WDBT changed its call sign to WLDA. Effective October 13, 2015, Gulf South Communications sold WLDA to Brantley Broadcast Associates for $225,000. On October 15, WLDA went silent.

In a series of moves between October 2015 and 2016 involving new cities of license, the station was moved out of the Dothan radio market and into the Montgomery market. In the process, the station changed frequencies to 93.5 and significantly reduced power down to 4,400 watts from its original 100,000 watts.

On October 5, 2016, WLDA changed its call letters to WPHH.

On June 22, 2018, WPHH changed its format from oldies to contemporary Christian, branded as "The Joy FM". On August 23, 2018, Brantley Broadcast Associates consummated the sale of WPHH to Radio Training Network, Inc. for $450,000.
