= WDBT (FM) =

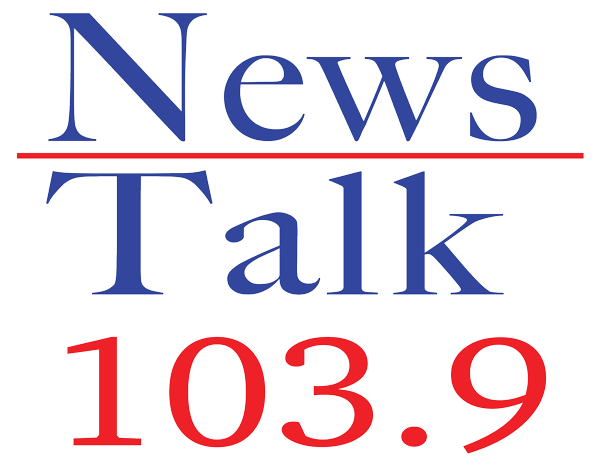
- Fort Rucker, Alabama; United States
- Broadcast area: Dothan, Alabama
- Frequency: 103.9 MHz (HD Radio)
- Branding: News Talk 103.9

Programming
- Format: News/talk
- Subchannels: HD2: Music 107.7 (Adult contemporary)
- Affiliations: Fox News Radio; Compass Media Networks; Premiere Networks; Westwood One

Ownership
- Owner: Clay Holladay; (Gulf South Communications, Inc.)
- Sister stations: WTVY-FM, WKMX-FM, WDJR-FM

History
- First air date: 1974 (as WAYD-FM)
- Former call signs: WAYD-FM (1974–1982); WORJ (1982–1989); WNER (1989–1990); WQLS (1990–1993); WQLS-FM (1993–2001); WJRL-FM (2001–2013); WLDA (2013–2015)

Technical information
- Licensing authority: FCC
- Facility ID: 63945
- Class: C3
- ERP: 25,000 watts
- HAAT: 89 meters (292 ft)
- Transmitter coordinates: 31°26′25″N 85°33′49″W
- Translator: HD2: 107.7 W299BX (Dothan)

Links
- Public license information: Public file; LMS
- Webcast: Listen Live
- Website: newstalk1039.com

WDBT (103.9 MHz) is an FM radio station licensed to serve Fort Rucker, Alabama, United States, part of the Dothan market. In addition, the station's digital FM signal transmits an adjacent channel, 103.9 HD2, which is also broadcast in analog on a translator signal on 107.7 FM as "Music 107.7". WDBT-FM began broadcasting in 1974, and is currently owned by Clay Holladay and the broadcast license held by Gulf South Communications, Inc.

== History ==
=== The beginning ===
This station began regular broadcasting in 1974 as WAYD-FM with 3,000 watts of effective radiated power on a frequency of 103.9 MHz and licensed to serve the community of Ozark, Alabama. Station owner Wade B. Sullivan built it as an FM sister station to his WAYD (1190 AM, later WQLS (1220 AM)), also then licensed to serve Ozark.

=== The 1980s ===
In October 1981, Wade B. Sullivan agreed to sell this station to Raymond F. Akin, J.A. Baxter, Jr., and Gordon L. Bostic doing business as RJG Communications. The deal was approved by the FCC on December 3, 1981.

The station became WORJ-FM in 1982 as "J-103", running a Top 40 format. In February 1983, RJG Communications announced its intention to sell this station to MSB Communications, Inc. The deal was approved by the FCC on April 8, 1983. During the same year, the station flipped to adult contemporary. In April 1985, Stephen G. McGowan made a deal to acquire full control of station licensee MSB Communications, Inc., from partners William James Samford, Jr., and William B. Blount. The deal was approved by the FCC on June 17, 1985, and the transfer of control was consummated on January 22, 1986.

In October 1988, MSB Communications, Inc., reached an agreement to sell this station to Wesley R. Morgan. The deal was approved by the FCC on November 10, 1988, and the transaction was consummated on December 29, 1988. The station was assigned the call letters WNER by the Federal Communications Commission on January 27, 1989. In March 1989, Wesley R. Morgan applied to the FCC to assign the license for this station to Morgan Broadcasting Limited Partnership. The deal was approved by the FCC on April 4, 1989, and the transaction was consummated on May 2, 1989.

=== The 1990s ===
In April 1990, Morgan Broadcasting Limited Partnership completed a deal to sell WNER to Sunrise Broadcasting Corp. The deal was approved by the FCC on June 21, 1990. The station's call letters were changed to WQLS on November 26, 1990. In May 1991, Sunrise Broadcasting Corp. applied to the FCC to transfer the license for this station to subsidiary company Sunrise Broadcasting of Alabama, Inc. The deal was approved by the FCC on June 13, 1991. In June 1992, Sunrise Broadcasting Corp. made a deal to transfer control of Sunrise Broadcasting of Alabama, Inc., to CVC Capital Corp. The deal was approved by the FCC on July 27, 1992. When an AM sister station was assigned the WQLS call letters, this station's call letters were modified to WQLS-FM on July 9, 1993.

In September 1995, Sunrise Broadcasting of Alabama, Inc., contracted to sell WQLS-FM to Woods Communications Group, Inc. The deal was approved by the FCC on November 21, 1995, and the transaction was consummated on January 20, 1996.

=== The 2000s ===
In May 2000, Woods Communications Group, Inc. (Charles Woods, chairman) agreed to sell this station to Jimmy Jarrell. The deal was approved by the FCC on July 17, 2000, and the transaction was consummated on July 25, 2000. Jarrell had the station assigned the WJRL-FM call letters by the FCC on February 27, 2001.

In May 2002, Styles Broadcasting Inc. (Kim Styles, CEO) reached an agreement to purchase country music formatted WJRL-FM and gospel music formatted sister station WQLS from Jimmy Jarrell for a reported sale price of $750,000. The deal gained FCC approval on June 24, 2002, and the deal was consummated on August 1, 2002.

In November 2003, Styles Broadcasting of Dothan, Inc., applied to assign the license for WJRL-FM to Styles Media Group, LLC. The deal was approved by the FCC on March 10, 2004, and the transaction was consummated on April 13, 2004. In March 2005, Styles Media Group, LLC, applied to the FCC to assign the license for this station to Styles Alabama Licensing, LLC. The assignment was approved by the FCC on March 23, 2005, and the transaction was consummated on January 31, 2006.

==== Magic Broadcasting ====
In 2006, Styles Broadcasting became the Magic Broadcasting Company. That same year, WJRL-FM dropped its "Thunder 103.9" branding and classic rock music format for a "My 103.9" branding and an adult hits format.

In April 2007, Magic Management Company, LLC, agreed to transfer control of licensee Magic Broadcasting Alabama Licensing LLC to Radio Broadcast Management, Inc. The transfer was approved by the FCC on June 20, 2007, and the transaction was consummated on July 1, 2007.

In January 2009, the station applied to the FCC for authorization to change its community of license to Fort Rucker, Alabama. This authorization was granted on March 25, 2009.

Shortly after Noon local time on April 1, 2009, the station began stunting with a continuous loop of "For Those About to Rock" by AC/DC. After the stunt, the station changed formats to active rock as "103-9 The Edge", which would last less than six months, as on September 24, 2009, the station once again changed formats. This time, the format changed to sports talk, branded as "Sportstalk 103.9", and picking up the market's rights to Auburn University athletics.

On September 9, 2010, the station once again changed formats, this time to rock, branded as "Rock 104".

==== Sale to Southeast Alabama Broadcasters ====
In November 2011, the station was purchased by Georgia Edminston's Southeast Alabama Broadcasters, LLC.

On January 23, 2013, WJRL-FM went silent (off the air) and its rock format moved to WLDA 100.5 FM Slocomb, Alabama, which flipped from urban. The two stations swapped call signs on January 29, 2013, with WJRL-FM taking on the WLDA call sign.

On October 12, 2015, WLDA changed their call letters to WDBT. Effective October 13, 2015, Southeast Alabama Broadcasters consummated the sale of WDBT to Gulf South Communications, Inc. for $260,000. On October 14, WDBT returned to the air with a news/talk format.

== WDBT-HD2 ==
On March 11, 2019 WDBT launched an adult contemporary format on its HD2 subchannel, branded as "Music 107.7" (simulcast on translator W299BX 107.7 FM Dothan).
