= WTVY-FM =

FM radio station (95.5 MHz) in Dothan, Alabama

- Dothan, Alabama; United States
- Broadcast area: Dothan, Alabama
- Frequency: 95.5 MHz
- Branding: 95-5 WTVY

Programming
- Format: Country

Ownership
- Owner: Gulf South Communications, Inc.
- Sister stations: WDJR, WDBT, WKMX

History
- First air date: September 20, 1968
- Call sign meaning: shared with former sister WTVY (TV)

Technical information
- Licensing authority: FCC
- Facility ID: 73639
- Class: C0
- ERP: 100,000 watts
- HAAT: 323 meters (1,060 ft)
- Transmitter coordinates: 31°15′16″N 85°15′39″W

Links
- Public license information: Public file; LMS
- Webcast: Listen Live
- Website: 955wtvy.com

WTVY-FM (95.5 MHz) is an American radio station licensed to serve the community of Dothan, Alabama, United States. The station is owned by Digio Strategies. The station began broadcasting on September 20, 1968; the station was originally owned by Woods Communications Corporation as a sister to WTVY television.

Previous logo

== Programming ==
WTVY-FM airs a country music format.
