= WBBK-FM =

Radio station in Blakely, Georgia, serving Dothan, Alabama

- Blakely, Georgia; United States
- Broadcast area: Dothan, Alabama
- Frequency: 93.1 MHz
- Branding: Magic 93.1

Programming
- Format: Urban Adult Contemporary
- Affiliations: ABC Radio

Ownership
- Owner: Robert H. Holladay; (Alabama Media, LLC)

Technical information
- Licensing authority: FCC
- Facility ID: 41207
- Class: C2
- ERP: 45,000 watts
- HAAT: 100 meters (330 ft)
- Transmitter coordinates: 31°17′55″N 85°03′18″W

Links
- Public license information: Public file; LMS
- Website: http://mymagic93.com

WBBK-FM (93.1 FM, "Magic 93.1") is a radio station licensed to serve Blakely, Georgia, United States. The station is owned by Robert H. Holladay, through licensee Alabama Media, LLC.

It broadcasts an urban adult contemporary music format to the Dothan, Alabama, area. WBBK-FM features programming from ABC Radio.

In November 2011, Magic Broadcasting and its Magic Broadcasting Alabama Licensing LLC subsidiary sold the station to Alabama Media Investments, LLC. Alabama Media Investments subsequently sold WBBK-FM to Robert Holladay's Alabama Media, LLC for $260,000; the transaction was consummated on February 28, 2013.
