= Dothan, Alabama =

City in and county seat of Houston County, Alabama

Dothan
- City
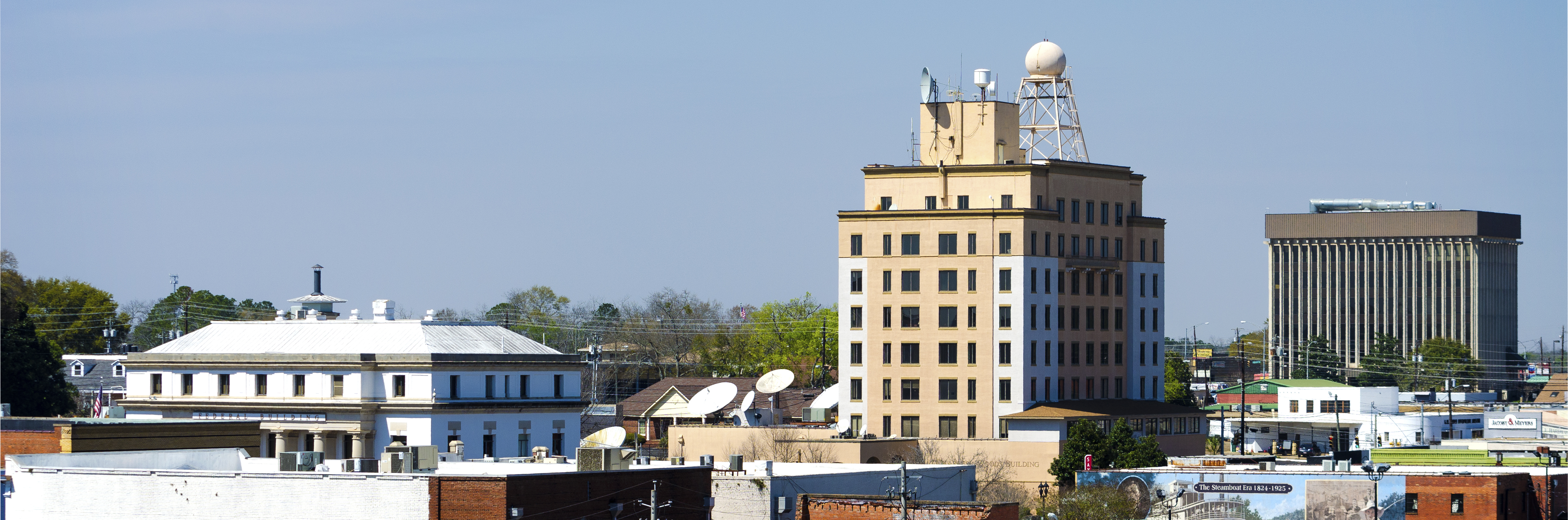
- Downtown Dothan

- Flag Seal

- Location of Dothan in Dale, Henry, and Houston counties, Alabama
- Coordinates: 31°15′53″N 85°21′16″W
- Country: United States
- State: Alabama
- Counties: Houston, Dale, Henry
- Established: 1885

Government
  - Type: Mayor - Council
  - Mayor: Mark Saliba (R)

Area
  - Total: 90.17 sq mi (233.53 km^{2})
  - Land: 89.84 sq mi (232.68 km^{2})
  - Water: 0.32 sq mi (0.84 km^{2})
- Elevation: 331 ft (101 m)

Population (2020)
  - Total: 71,072
  - Rank: AL: 8th
  - Density: 791.1/sq mi (305.45/km^{2})
  - CSA: 248,947
- Time zone: UTC-6 (Central (CST))
  - Summer (DST): UTC-5 (CDT)
- ZIP Codes: 36301–36305, 36345, 36350
- FIPS code: 01-21184
- GNIS feature ID: 2404238
- Website: www.dothan.org

Dothan is a city in and the county seat of Houston County in the U.S. state of Alabama. A slight portion of the city extends into Dale and Henry counties. It had a population of 71,258 at the 2020 census, making it Alabama's eighth-largest city by population and the 5th largest in Alabama by total area. It is near the state's southeastern corner, about 20 miles (32 km) west of Georgia and 16 miles (26 km) north of Florida. It is named after the biblical city of Dothan.

Dothan is the principal city of the Dothan, Alabama metropolitan area, which encompasses all of Geneva, Henry, and Houston counties; the small portion in Dale County is part of the Ozark Micropolitan Statistical Area. Together they form the Dothan-Ozark Combined Statistical Area. Coffee County and its Enterprise micropolitan area was originally combined as a statistical area with both Dothan and Ozark as well, but is now split off as its own statistical area by the US Census Bureau. Together they form the Alabama portion of the Wiregrass region, of which Dothan is that portion's largest city. The combined population of the entire Dothan metropolitan area in 2020 was 151,007. The city is the main transportation and commercial hub for a significant part of southeastern Alabama, southwest Georgia, and nearby portions of the Florida Panhandle. Since approximately one-fourth of the U.S. peanut crop is produced nearby, much of it processed in the city, Dothan is known as "The Peanut Capital of the World". It also hosts the annual National Peanut Festival at the Peanut Festival Fairgrounds.

== History ==
=== Earliest years ===
Between 1763 and 1783, the region that is now Dothan was part of the colony of British West Florida. European-American settlers moving through the area during the late 18th and early 19th centuries discovered the Indian spring, naming it "Poplar Head". Most felt that the sandy soil common to this region would be unsuitable for farming, so they moved on.

A crude stockade was constructed on the Barber Plantation, where settlers could take refuge whenever they felt threatened. Gradually the area received more white settlers. This fort disappeared by the 1840s, after the end of the Indian Wars in Alabama and Indian Removal in the 1830s, when most members of the Five Civilized Tribes were forcibly taken to Indian Territory west of the Mississippi River. Those members of the tribe who stayed in the southeast were considered to have given up their tribal memberships and became state and U.S. citizens.

The first permanent white settlers consisted of nine families who moved into the area during the early 1830s to harvest the abundant timber. Their settlement, named Poplar Head after the spring, failed to thrive. It was all but abandoned by the time of the Civil War. After the war, a local Pony Express route was founded; together with other developments during the Reconstruction Era, the town began to grow. On November 11, 1885, the citizens voted to incorporate, naming their new city Dothan at the suggestion of a local clergyman after discovering that "Poplar Head" was already registered with the U.S. post office for a town in northern Alabama.

=== Civil unrest ===
On October 12, 1889, Dothan was the scene of a deadly altercation resulting from a dispute over a tax levied on wagons operating within city limits. Local farmers opposed the levy and united in a body called the "Farmers Alliance". The arrest of some of the alliance's men led to a riot that left two men dead and others seriously wounded. Chief of Police Tobe Domingus was found guilty of murder and sentenced to ten years in prison. Appeals to the Alabama Supreme Court resulted in a new trial, and Domingus was acquitted.

=== Expansion and growth ===
In 1893, Dothan secured a stop on the first railroad to be built in the region. This development brought new prosperity and growth, as local farmers had a means to market and transport their produce. The pine forests were harvested for turpentine and wood, which was transformed into ship masts, lumber and other wood products. As the pines were cut and land subsequently cleared, cotton was cultivated as a staple of the local economy. The crops were devastated by the boll weevil in the early 1900s.

Farmers turned to peanut production, which was successful and brought financial gain to the city. It became a hub for the production and transport of peanuts and peanut-related products. Today, one-quarter of the U.S. peanut crop is harvested within 75 miles (121 km) of Dothan. Dothan also became a hub for industrial development in the 20th century, with textile and agricultural concerns being joined by manufacturing plants for the Sony, Michelin, and General Electric corporations which began operating facilities in the city.

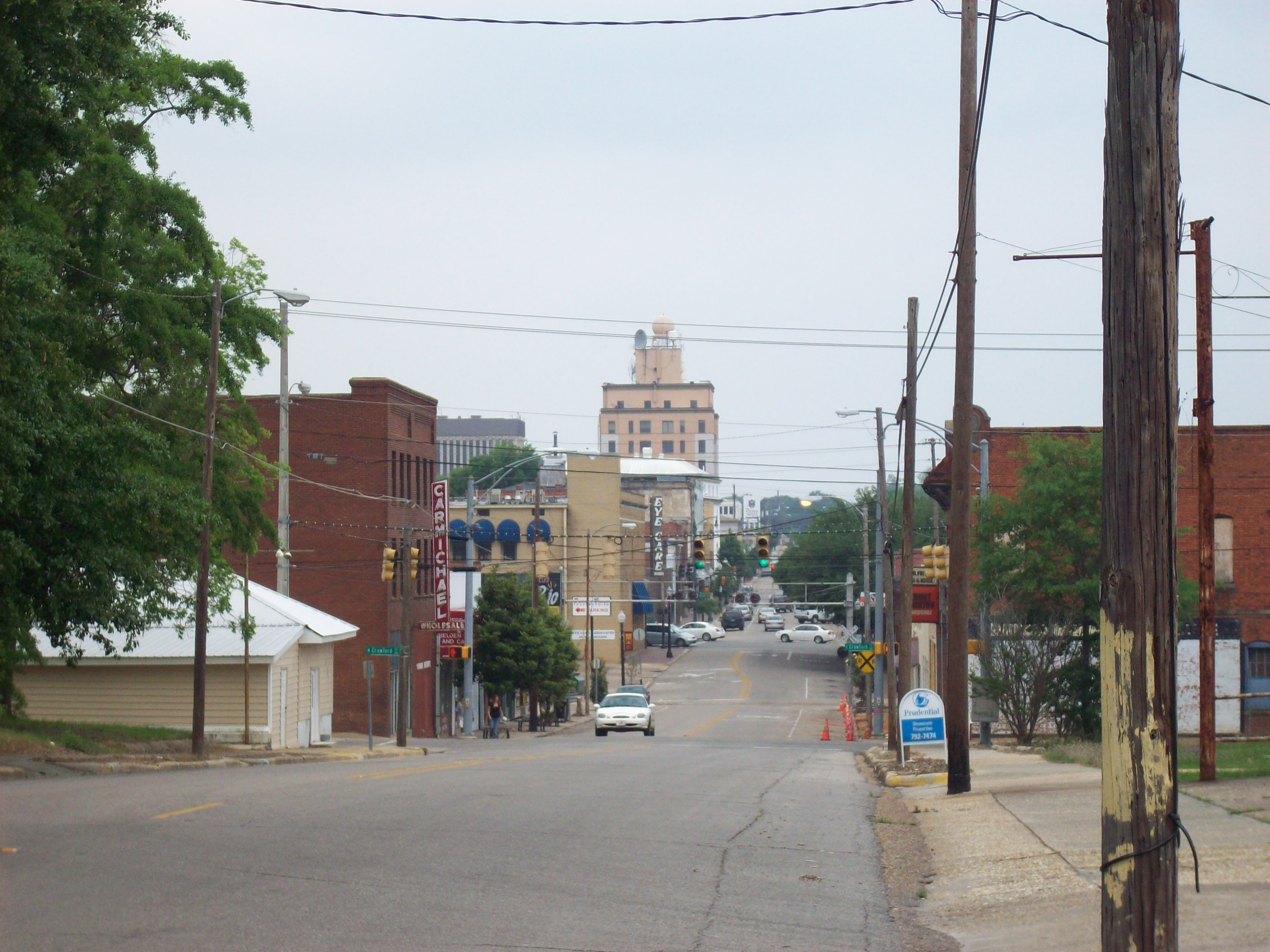
Looking up Foster St. toward downtown Dothan

Dothan also sought out industrial development, with textile and agricultural concerns being joined by manufacturing plants for the Sony, Michelin, and General Electric corporations in the 20th century. The Southern Company constructed the Joseph M. Farley Nuclear Generating Station near the city between 1970 and 1981; this 1,776-megawatt facility currently generates approximately 13,000 GW-h per year. In 2010, Sony announced its closure of its Dothan plant. Pemco Aviation declared bankruptcy in March 2012 and in May that year announced the closing of its Dothan facility.

Originally part of Henry County, Alabama, Dothan became the county seat of the newly formed Houston County on May 9, 1903. The city continued to flourish and grow throughout the twentieth century, with the Dothan Regional Airport being constructed in 1965 and Wallace Community College in 1969. Troy University established a Dothan campus in 1961 in the northwestern part of the city.

Porter Hardware, the oldest hardware store in the state of Alabama, was located in Dothan from 1889 to 2014. In 2018 it reopened as a museum.

== Geography ==
Dothan is in northwestern Houston County in southeastern Alabama. The city limits extend north into Henry County and northwest into Dale County. According to the United States Census Bureau, the city has an area of 89.7 square miles (232.4 km^{2}), of which 89.4 square miles (231.5 km^{2}) is land and 0.31 square miles (0.8 km^{2}), or 0.36%, is water.

It is located in the Wiregrass region of southeastern Alabama, near both the Florida and Georgia state lines. The topography is generally flat and forested, with few small hills that gradually slope downward towards the Chattahoochee River to the east and the gulf coastal plain to the south.

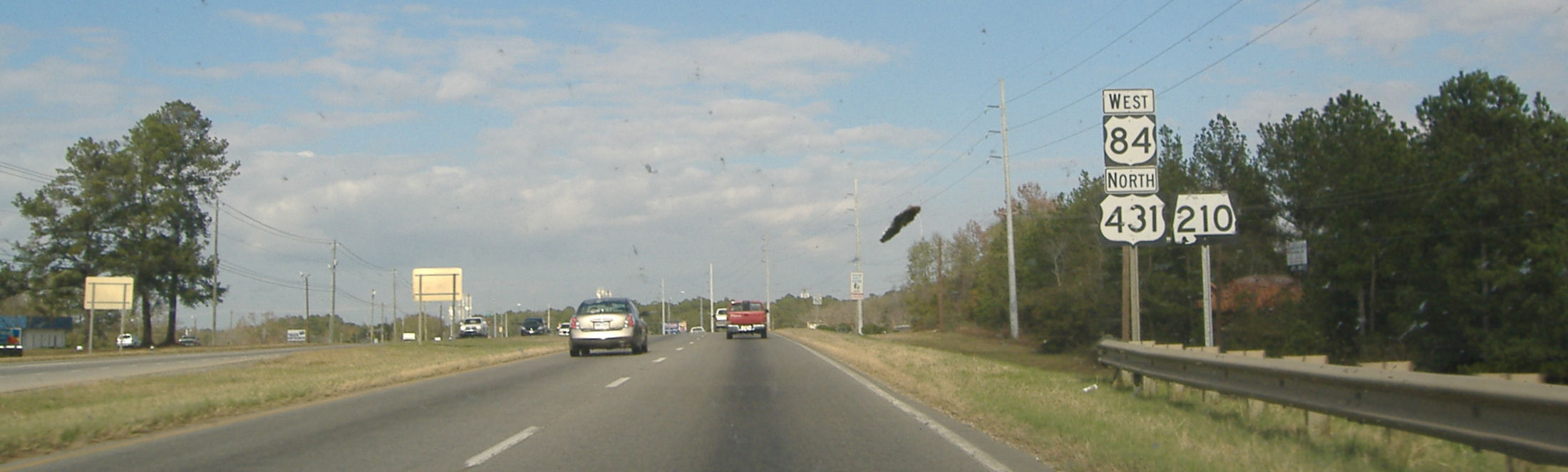
Ross Clark Circle on Dothan's east side

=== Climate ===
Dothan has a humid subtropical climate (Köppen Cfa). This produces hot, humid summers and generally mild winters, with daily average temperatures ranging from 83.0 °F (28.3 °C) in the summer to 50.8 °F (10.4 °C) during winter. Precipitation is plentiful throughout the year, ranging from 6.17 inches (157 mm) in August, the wettest month, to 2.70 inches (69 mm) in October, the driest month. Snowfall is extremely rare; a two-inch snowfall occurs about once every ten years, which results in a yearly average of 0.2 inches (5.1 mm); the last major snow event occurred on January 21, 2025. Other significant snow events in the city's history occurred in 1973, 1977, 1989, 1993, and 2010. Tornadoes are a frequent risk during the spring, summer and fall; the city's tornado activity is slightly below the Alabama state average, but 79% above the U.S. average.

Climate data for Dothan Regional Airport, Alabama, 1991–2020 normals, extremes 1939–present
Month	Jan	Feb	Mar	Apr	May	Jun	Jul	Aug	Sep	Oct	Nov	Dec	Year
Record high °F (°C)	83 (28)	86 (30)	90 (32)	95 (35)	104 (40)	105 (41)	105 (41)	104 (40)	102 (39)	100 (38)	88 (31)	84 (29)	105 (41)
Mean maximum °F (°C)	76.1 (24.5)	78.8 (26.0)	83.9 (28.8)	87.9 (31.1)	94.6 (34.8)	97.1 (36.2)	98.3 (36.8)	97.4 (36.3)	94.9 (34.9)	89.8 (32.1)	82.8 (28.2)	78.0 (25.6)	99.3 (37.4)
Mean daily maximum °F (°C)	61.7 (16.5)	65.8 (18.8)	72.9 (22.7)	79.3 (26.3)	87.2 (30.7)	91.3 (32.9)	93.3 (34.1)	92.0 (33.3)	88.4 (31.3)	80.8 (27.1)	71.1 (21.7)	63.8 (17.7)	79.0 (26.1)
Daily mean °F (°C)	50.8 (10.4)	54.6 (12.6)	60.8 (16.0)	67.2 (19.6)	75.6 (24.2)	81.1 (27.3)	83.0 (28.3)	82.0 (27.8)	77.9 (25.5)	68.9 (20.5)	58.9 (14.9)	53.1 (11.7)	67.8 (19.9)
Mean daily minimum °F (°C)	39.8 (4.3)	43.3 (6.3)	48.8 (9.3)	55.2 (12.9)	64.0 (17.8)	70.8 (21.6)	72.7 (22.6)	72.0 (22.2)	67.3 (19.6)	56.9 (13.8)	46.7 (8.2)	42.4 (5.8)	56.7 (13.7)
Mean minimum °F (°C)	23.1 (−4.9)	27.2 (−2.7)	32.3 (0.2)	41.0 (5.0)	51.0 (10.6)	63.5 (17.5)	68.5 (20.3)	66.0 (18.9)	55.8 (13.2)	40.4 (4.7)	31.0 (−0.6)	27.6 (−2.4)	20.9 (−6.2)
Record low °F (°C)	4 (−16)	12 (−11)	19 (−7)	31 (−1)	44 (7)	49 (9)	57 (14)	59 (15)	43 (6)	30 (−1)	17 (−8)	7 (−14)	4 (−16)
Average precipitation inches (mm)	4.76 (121)	4.82 (122)	4.72 (120)	4.79 (122)	2.92 (74)	5.08 (129)	5.95 (151)	6.17 (157)	3.27 (83)	2.70 (69)	3.91 (99)	4.76 (121)	53.85 (1,368)
Average precipitation days (≥ 0.01 in)	10.5	9.9	8.8	7.4	7.9	12.8	13.8	13.4	8.4	7.0	8.4	10.7	119.0
Source: NOAA

== Demographics ==
Historical population
Census	Pop.	Note	%±
1890	247		—
1900	3,275		1,225.9%
1910	7,016		114.2%
1920	10,034		43.0%
1930	16,046		59.9%
1940	17,194		7.2%
1950	21,584		25.5%
1960	31,440		45.7%
1970	36,733		16.8%
1980	48,750		32.7%
1990	53,589		9.9%
2000	57,737		7.7%
2010	65,496		13.4%
2020	71,072		8.5%
U.S. Decennial Census; 2018 Estimate

The state-recognized Cher-O-Creek Intra Tribal Indians were in Dothan. They descended from members of the Cherokee and Creek peoples who occupied this area and resisted removal to Indian Territory in the 1830s.

=== Racial and ethnic composition ===
Dothan city, Alabama – Racial and ethnic composition Note: the US Census treats Hispanic/Latino as an ethnic category. This table excludes Latinos from the racial categories and assigns them to a separate category. Hispanics/Latinos may be of any race.
Race / Ethnicity (NH = Non-Hispanic)	Pop 1980	Pop 1990	Pop 2000	Pop 2010	Pop 2020	% 1980	% 1990	% 2000	% 2010	% 2020
White alone (NH)	35,677	38,096	38,508	40,412	39,834	73.18%	71.09%	66.70%	61.70%	56.05%
Black or African American alone (NH)	12,172	14,599	17,292	21,207	23,755	24.97%	27.24%	29.95%	32.38%	33.42%
Native American or Alaska Native alone (NH)	145	132	154	206	180	0.30%	0.25%	0.27%	0.31%	0.25%
Asian alone (NH)	278	401	489	712	1,124	0.57%	0.75%	0.85%	1.09%	1.58%
Native Hawaiian or Pacific Islander alone (NH)	x	x	10	40	44	x	x	0.02%	0.06%	0.06%
Other race alone (NH)	7	2	43	77	261	0.01%	0.00%	0.07%	0.12%	0.37%
Mixed race or Multiracial (NH)	x	x	477	953	2,743	x	x	0.83%	1.46%	3.86%
Hispanic or Latino (any race)	471	359	764	1,889	3,131	0.97%	0.67%	1.32%	2.88%	4.41%
Total	48,750	53,589	57,737	65,496	71,072	100.00%	100.00%	100.00%	100.00%	100.00%

=== 2020 census ===
As of the 2020 census, Dothan had a population of 71,072 and 30,115 households, including 16,607 families. The median age was 40.4 years; 22.6% of residents were under the age of 18 and 19.3% of residents were 65 years of age or older.

For every 100 females there were 88.2 males, and for every 100 females age 18 and over there were 83.5 males age 18 and over.

93.1% of residents lived in urban areas, while 6.9% lived in rural areas.

There were 30,115 households in Dothan, of which 28.2% had children under the age of 18 living in them. Of all households, 39.9% were married-couple households, 18.2% were households with a male householder and no spouse or partner present, and 36.3% were households with a female householder and no spouse or partner present. About 32.8% of all households were made up of individuals and 14.3% had someone living alone who was 65 years of age or older.

There were 33,242 housing units, of which 9.4% were vacant. The homeowner vacancy rate was 2.2% and the rental vacancy rate was 8.2%.

== Government ==
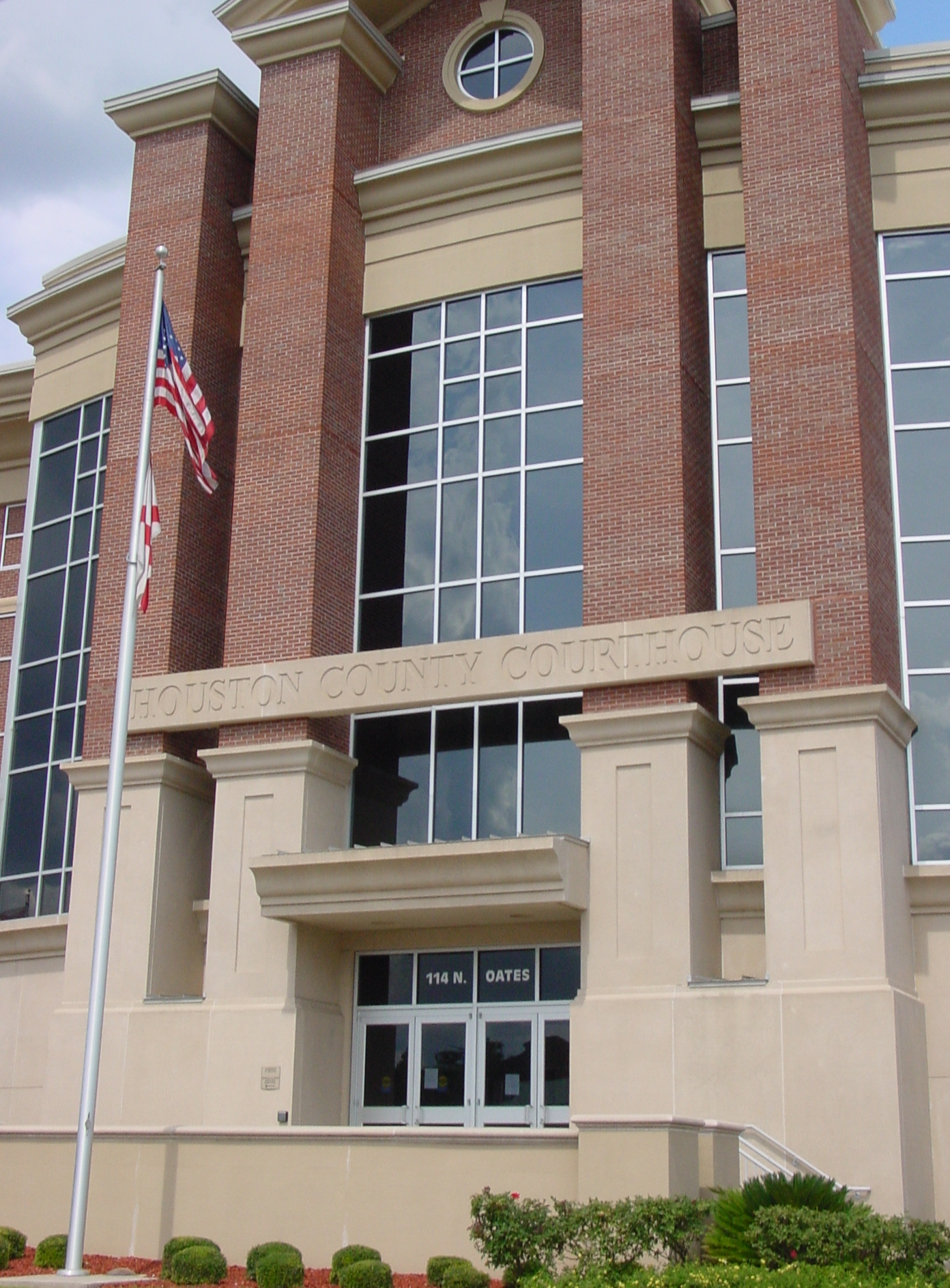
Houston County Courthouse in Dothan

Dothan is governed by a mayor and city council (called the "board of commissioners"), with a city manager employed to manage city affairs. The city is divided into six council districts, with one commissioner elected from each single-member district to a four-year term. Members of the commission serve part-time and are responsible for drafting all city ordinances and policies and appropriation of city funds. Dothan's mayor is elected at-large for four years and serves as a member of the board of commissioners. The city manager implements the board's policies and manages the city's day-to-day operations, including hiring, managing and firing the heads of city government departments. A total of 999 full-time and 215 part-time employees work for Dothan's city agencies, including police, fire, clerical, judicial, finance, public works and utilities.

As of 2024, the mayor was Mark Saliba and the city manager's position was open. Larry H. Williams served as city fire chief and Will Benny was police chief.

Dothan is in Alabama's 2nd congressional district; its representative (as of 2021) is Barry Moore. The city is divided among three different state senate districts (28, 29 and 31) and four state representative districts (85, 86, 87 and 93).

== Education ==
Most K-12 students in Dothan and Houston County attend Dothan City Schools or Houston County Schools. Others attend local private schools, such as Houston Academy, Providence Christian School, Northside Methodist Academy, Emmanuel Christian School, and Westgate Christian School. Institutes of higher education include Fortis College, Troy University Dothan Campus, Wallace Community College, Bethany Divinity College & Seminary, and the Alabama College of Osteopathic Medicine.

== Infrastructure ==
=== Airport ===
Dothan Regional Airport is served by Delta Air Lines and Aero-One Aviation as of September 2017. The airport was established at the former Army airbase at Napier Field in 1965, after then-Mayor Richmond McClintock started a push to move the airport in the early 1950s. Jet services began in 1968 with Southern Airways' acquisition of DC-9 aircraft, and continue today using the CRJ-200 regional passenger jet.

Unlike many municipal airports in the U.S., the Dothan airport is entirely self-supporting, operating without tax-generated funding. All airport revenue is generated by rental and other user fees charged to patrons and tenants of the facility.

The airport serves as the local National Weather Service's weather observation station.

=== Roadways ===
U.S. Routes 84, 231, and 431 run through Dothan along various parts of Ross Clark Circle (AL-210), the bypass encircling the city. U.S. 84 runs along the northern part of the bypass from west to east, leading east 55 mi (89 km) to Bainbridge, Georgia and west 30 mi (48 km) to Enterprise. U.S. 231 runs along the western part of the bypass from south to north, leading northwest 56 mi (90 km) to Troy and south 83 mi (134 km) to Panama City, Florida. U.S. 431 begins its path northward at the southern end of Ross Clark Circle, and runs along the eastern part of the bypass, leading north 51 mi (82 km) to Eufaula. Other highways that run through Dothan include Alabama State Routes 52 and 53. Dothan is currently the only city in Alabama's top ten largest that does not have Interstate access, with the closest Interstate being Interstate 10 that runs 32 miles to the south.

=== Transit ===
Although passenger trains no longer operate through Dothan, the 1907 Dothan station still stands. Greyhound Bus Lines maintains a station in town. Dothan does not have regularly scheduled public transportation, but offers dial-a-ride service through its nonprofit Wiregrass Transit Authority.

== Religion ==
The largest Christian denomination in Dothan is the Southern Baptist church. There are also Anglican, Churches of Christ, Methodist, Presbyterian, Lutheran, AME, Freewill Baptist, Episcopal, United Pentecostal, Assemblies of God, Seventh-day Adventist and various Evangelical churches serving Dothan's Protestant community. Saint Michael's Orthodox Church is an Antiochian Orthodox Church, serving the Orthodox community in Dothan and the Wiregrass. St. Columba Catholic Church serves Dothan's Roman Catholics. Dothan hosts a Reform Judaism synagogue, Temple Emanu-El, which became nationally famous in 2008 when the congregation offered Jewish families as much as $50,000 to relocate to Dothan to build up the community. The city is also home to two mosques, two wards of The Church of Jesus Christ of Latter-Day Saints, and a Kingdom Hall of Jehovah's Witnesses.

== Media ==
Dothan is served by a daily newspaper, the Dothan Eagle, a weekly newspaper, the Dothan Progress, and a blog, Rickey Stokes News. It has four television stations, WRGX-LD 23 (NBC), WDFX 34 (FOX), WDHN 18 (ABC) and the oldest television station in southeastern Alabama, WTVY 4 (CBS/MyNetworkTV/CW). WOW!, Comcast and Spectrum (formerly Time Warner Cable) provide cable television service. DirecTV and Dish Network provide direct broadcast satellite television, including local and national channels. The city is also served by several radio stations; among the oldest is 560 WOOF-AM, which went on the air as an AM station in 1947; 99.7 WOOF-FM went on the air in 1964. As of 2020, the radio formats in Dothan are top 40/CHR/pop (106.7 WKMX), adult contemporary (107.7 W299BX, 99.7 WOOF-FM), classical (88.7 WRWA), Christian (94.3 WIZB), rock (100.5 WJRL-FM), classic hits (102.5 WLDQ), country (95.5 WTVY-FM, 105.3 WECB), rap/hip hop/urban (700/105.9 WARB/W290DG), urban adult contemporary (93.1 WBBK-FM), talk radio (103.9 WDBT), and sports (560/101.1/107.1 WOOF-AM/W261AT/W296DQ). Dothan Magazine offers a bimonthly, people-focused viewpoint of the Dothan area keeping readers up to date on the latest community events, trends and issues. Archived issues of Dothan Magazine are online.

== Sports ==
Dothan hosted minor league baseball teams from 1915 to 1917, with the Dothan team (AL-FL-GA League and Dixie League) and from 1936 to 1962 (AL-FL League, GA-FL League and AL State League). Teams were known at varying times as the Boll Weevils, Dothan Browns, Rebels, Cardinals and Phillies. Major League affiliations were maintained in later years with the St. Louis Cardinals and the Philadelphia Phillies. All teams played at the "D" league level, a defunct minor-league classification that represented the entry or "rookie" level in the minors. Ballparks included Baker Field, City Park, Stadium Park, Jill Alexander Miracle Field and the Wiregrass Memorial Stadium.

The city served host to the Ultimate Fighting Championship on February 7, 1997, at the Dothan Civic Center Arena.

Dothan was selected as one of 11 Alabama sites for a course on the Robert Trent Jones Golf Trail.

In 2007–10, Dothan was recognized as part of the "Playful City USA" initiative by KaBOOM!, created to honor cities that ensure that their children have great places to play.

== Economy ==
Dothan has a diverse economy. Agriculture is the largest industry, though retail sales and restaurants have experienced a rapid growth in recent years. Peanut production remains a mainstay of the agricultural sector, but cotton is gaining in importance. Tomato production is significant as well, especially in the nearby town of Slocomb, which styles itself "the Tomato Capital of the World".

=== Top employers ===
According to the city's 2011 Comprehensive Annual Financial Report, the top employers in the city are:

#	Employer	Employees
1	Southeast Alabama Medical Center	2,500
2	Dothan City & Houston County Schools	1,973
3	Flowers Hospital	1,100
4	City of Dothan	927
5	Southern Nuclear (Farley)	860
6	Perdue Farms	800
7	Michelin	542
8	Houston County	430
9	AAA Cooper	425
10	Twitchell	387

== Crime ==
According to records available on a police violence tracking website, police have killed 20 people directly or indirectly between 2000 and 2020. Most of the victims were shot, tasered or asphyxiated. Particularly brutal was the killing of a man at a local animal shelter over his refusal to show proper identification to police. A federal judge cleared the police officer after body camera footage showed that the man had taken the officer's taser and attempted to use it on the officer during an altercation. In 2021, the city of Dothan settled a lawsuit with a payment of $250,000.

== Culture ==
=== Festivals ===
The National Peanut Festival occurs annually in November and attracts up to 200,000 visitors. The festival hosts a wide variety of carnival rides, games, live music, and competitions. A large midway, entertainment by nationally known recording artists, and the largest parade in the area are featured attractions. On the last day of the fair, a peanut festival parade takes place in downtown Dothan.

Dothan is also home to two professional barbecue competitions. The Tri-State BBQ Festival is held the second weekend in April, and is sanctioned by the Florida Bar-B-Que Association. It was begun in 2006 and is currently put on at the Houston County Farm Center. PorktoberQue, an Oktoberfest and Kansas City Barbeque Society (KCBS) sanctioned event, is held the last weekend of September in Dothan at the same location as the Peanut Festival.

=== Museums and monuments ===
The US Army Aviation Museum, at nearby Fort Rucker, houses one of the largest helicopter collections in the world. The museum focuses on the role of fixed and rotary-wing flight in the U.S. Army. The exhibits depict over 100 years of Army aviation, and include a number of life size dioramas, films, and interpretive material.

The George Washington Carver Museum relates the story of the African-American genius and offers information on African cultures and their influences on the world, prominent African-American scientists, explorers and inventors, and the positive contributions African Americans have made in military affairs and social development.

The Wiregrass Museum of Art, in the city's original power and water plant (1913), features ongoing exhibitions of visual and decorative art. Its permanent collection includes works by contemporary Southeastern artists such as Dale Kennington, Frank Flemming, Dale Lewis and Cal Breed, as well by nationally recognized artists including Frank Stella and Jim Dine. The museum was organized in 1989 by private citizens and the City of Dothan; it is operated by the Wiregrass Museum of Art, Inc., a 501(c)3 organization.

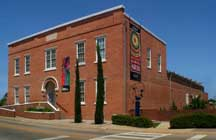
Wiregrass Museum of Art

=== Art and theatre scene ===
Southeast Alabama Community Theater offers live entertainment and theatrical productions for the Dothan community.

Spark Theater Company is a nonprofit theater company and performing-arts educational program. Spark Theater offers several public theater productions each year by Dothan-area youth and teens, an after-school theater program, as well as supplemental theater classes for the public school system.

=== Notable public art ===
The Joseph statue at Millennium Park is a ten-foot cast bronze sculpture in the downtown area. It represents the Bible verse "For I heard them say, Let us go to Dothan" (Genesis 37:17), on which the town based its name.

Peanuts Around Town is a public art project organized by The Downtown Group, consisting of 5-foot-tall (1.5 m), life-sized peanut sculptures decorated in various fashions and displayed around Dothan.

"Wiregrass Festival of Murals" is an ongoing project offering historic murals painted by nationally and internationally acclaimed muralists on walls of buildings in the downtown historic district. Guided tours are available upon request.

=== Local music ===
The Dothan Opera House, built in 1915, features theatre performances, concerts, symphonies, ballet performances, and other cultural events. Tours are available upon request.

Music South, formerly the Southern Alabama Symphony Association, offers a wide variety of musical performances, from classical symphony performances to jazz, African and other musical styles. "Music by Moonlight" offers four free concerts per year at Dothan's Landmark Park, featuring classical, jazz, Celtic and bluegrass musicians, among others.

Patti Rutland Jazz is a professional contemporary jazz and hip-hop dance company in Dothan. The company produces two full-length jazz and hip-hop theatrical dance productions yearly (one in late February and one in early June) at its home in the Cultural Arts Center, as well as at Dothan's historical landmark Opera House. Patti Rutland Jazz operates as a nonprofit 501(c)(3) organization whose core mission is to offer its dancers to the Wiregrass Region to assist underserved youths with free dance classes. This mutually beneficial program hopes to make Dothan a destination for, and a source of, future professional dance talent in the United States.

== Area attractions ==
A bridge and pond at the Dothan Area Botanical Gardens

- The Dothan Area Botanical Gardens include 50 acres (20 ha) of cultivated gardens and undeveloped wooded landscapes.
- Landmark Park is a 135-acre (55 ha) park built to preserve the natural and cultural heritage of southeast Alabama's Wiregrass Region and serves as Alabama's official museum of agriculture.
- Highland Oaks Golf Course is part of Alabama's Robert Trent Jones Golf Trail.
- The "World's Smallest City Block" is behind the Dothan City Civic Center between North Appletree Street, North College Street, and East Troy Street.

== Notable people ==
- John Rainey Adkins (1941–1989), self-taught guitarist and songwriter
- Johnny Mack Brown (1904–1974), film actor
- Matt Cain (born 1984), Major League Baseball pitcher
- Dancin' Dave (1927–2015), local street performer
- Donna D'Errico (born 1968), actress and model
- Terry Everett, former U.S. Congressman for the 2nd District of Alabama
- Trent Forrest (born 1998), National Basketball Association player
- Bobby Goldsboro (born 1941), singer and songwriter
- Clay Holmes (born 1993), Major League Baseball pitcher
- Haywood Sullivan (1930–2003), Major League Baseball catcher and owner
- Jamie Thomas (born 1974), professional skateboarder
- Ken Grimwood (born 1944), author
