= Billy Joe Royal discography =

- Studio albums: 14
- Compilation albums: 4
- Singles: 37

Billy Joe Royal was an American country soul artist. His discography consists of 14 studio albums and 37 singles. Of his 37 singles, 16 charted on the U.S. Billboard Hot 100 between 1965 and 1978 and 15 charted on the U.S.'s Billboard Hot Country Songs chart between 1985 and 1992.

== Albums ==
=== Studio albums ===
Title	Album details	Peak chart positions			Certifications (sales thresholds)
Title	Album details	US Country	US	CAN Country	Certifications (sales thresholds)
Down in the Boondocks	Release date: July 1965; Label: Columbia Records	—	96	—	
Billy Joe Royal featuring Hush	Release date: November 1967; Label: Columbia Records	—	—	—	
Cherry Hill Park	Release date: December 1969; Label: Columbia Records	—	100	—	
Billy Joe Royal	Release date: 1980; Label: Mercury Records	—	—	—	
Billy Joe Royal	Release date: May 8, 1981; Label: Kat Family Records	—	—	—	
Makin' Believe	Release date: 1982; Label: Brylen Records	—	—	—	
Folio	Release date: February 24, 1983; Label: 51 West Records & Tapes	—	—	—	
Looking Ahead	Release date: April 21, 1986; Label: Atlantic America	21	—	—	
The Royal Treatment	Release date: September 28, 1987; Label: Atlantic America	5	—	—	US: Gold
Tell It Like It Is	Release date: February 1, 1989; Label: Atlantic America	15	—	31	
Out of the Shadows	Release date: June 1990; Label: Atlantic Records	24	—	—	
Billy Joe Royal	Release date: March 5, 1992; Label: Atlantic Records	—	—	—	
Stay Close to Home	Release date: August 25, 1998; Label: Intersound Records	—	—	—	
His First Gospel Album	Release date: July 3, 2009; Label: Gusto Records	—	—	—	
"—" denotes releases that did not chart

=== Compilations ===
Title	Album details	Peak positions
Title	Album details	US Country
Greatest Hits	Release date: May 1, 1989; Label: Columbia Records	—
Greatest Hits	Release date: March 5, 1991; Label: Atlantic Records	32
Super Hits	Release date: September 6, 2000; Label: Atlantic Records	—
Best of Billy Joe Royal	Release date: April 26, 2005; Label: Intersound Records	—
"—" denotes releases that did not chart

== Singles ==
=== 1960s — 1970s ===
Year	Title	Peak positions			Album
Year	Title	US	CAN	AUS	Album
1965	"Down in the Boondocks"	9	1	10	Down in the Boondocks
1965	"I Knew You When"	14	1	55	Down in the Boondocks
1966	"I've Got to Be Somebody"	38	15	—	Down in the Boondocks
1966	"It's a Good Time"	104	—	—	—N/a
1966	"Heart's Desire"	88	56	—	Billy Joe Royal featuring Hush
1966	"Campfire Girls"	91	68	—	—N/a
1967	"Yo-Yo"	117	28	—	Billy Joe Royal featuring Hush
1967	"These Are Not My People"	113	—	—	Billy Joe Royal featuring Hush
1967	"The Greatest Love"	117	—	—	Billy Joe Royal featuring Hush
1967	"Hush"	52	45	98	Billy Joe Royal featuring Hush
1968	"Storybook Children"	117	—	—	—N/a
1969	"Cherry Hill Park"	15	8	69	Cherry Hill Park
1970	"Every Night"	113	—	—	—N/a
1971	"Tulsa"	86	81	—	—N/a
1971	"Poor Little Pearl"	111	91	—	—N/a
1978	"Under the Boardwalk" (Note: "Under the Boardwalk" also peaked at number 37 on the RPM Adult Contemporary Tracks chart.)	82	74	—	—N/a
"—" denotes releases that did not chart

=== 1980s — 2000s ===
Year	Title	Peak positions		Album
Year	Title	US Country	CAN Country	Album
1980	"(How Do I Like to Dance) Slowly"	—	—	Billy Joe Royal (1980)
1980	"He'll Have to Go"	—	—	Billy Joe Royal (1980)
1981	"(Who Is Like You) Sweet America"	—	—	Billy Joe Royal (1981)
1981	"You Really Got a Hold on Me"	—	—	Billy Joe Royal (1981)
1981	"Wasted Time"	—	—	Billy Joe Royal (1981)
1985	"Burned Like a Rocket"	10	—	Looking Ahead
1986	"Boardwalk Angel"	41	37	Looking Ahead
1986	"I Miss You Already"	14	—	Looking Ahead
1987	"Old Bridges Burn Slow"	11	—	Looking Ahead
1987	"I'll Pin a Note on Your Pillow"	5	17	The Royal Treatment
1988	"Out of Sight and on My Mind"	10	7	The Royal Treatment
1988	"It Keeps Right on Hurtin'"	17	15	The Royal Treatment
1989	"Tell It Like It Is"	2	2	Tell It Like It Is
1989	"Love Has No Right"	4	3	Tell It Like It Is
1989	"Till I Can't Take It Anymore"	2	3	Tell It Like It Is
1990	"Searchin' for Some Kind of Clue"	17	33	Out of the Shadows
1990	"A Ring Where a Ring Used to Be"	33	43	Out of the Shadows
1991	"If the Jukebox Took Teardrops"	29	24	Out of the Shadows
1992	"I'm Okay (And Gettin' Better)"	51	68	Billy Joe Royal (1992)
1992	"Funny How Time Slips Away"	—	—	Billy Joe Royal (1992)
2009	"Hard Rock to Roll"	—	—	His First Gospel Album
"—" denotes releases that did not chart

=== Guest singles ===
Year	Title	Artist	Peak positions	Album
Year	Title	Artist	US Country	Album
1987	"Members Only"	Donna Fargo	23	Winners

== Music videos ==
Year	Video	Director
1987	"I'll Pin a Note on Your Pillow"	Marc Ball
1988	"Out of Sight and On My Mind"	Simeon Soffer
1989	"Tell It Like It Is"	John Lloyd Miller
1989	"Love Has No Right"	Piers Plowden
1989	"Till I Can't Take It Anymore"	Jason Furrate
1990	"A Ring Where a Ring Used to Be"	Richard Jernigan
1992	"Funny How Time Slips Away"	—N/a
