= Greatest Hits (Billy Joe Royal album) =

Greatest hits album by Billy Joe Royal
- Released: February 12, 1991
- Genre: Country
- Length: 30:59
- Label: Atlantic
- Producer: Nelson Larkin

Billy Joe Royal chronology
Out of the Shadows (1990)	Greatest Hits (1991)

Professional ratings
Review scores
Source	Rating
Allmusic	4.5/5 stars

Greatest Hits is the second compilation album by American country pop artist Billy Joe Royal. It was released on February 12, 1991 via Atlantic Records. The album peaked at number 32 on the Billboard Top Country Albums chart.

== Track listing ==
No.	Title	Writer(s)	Length
1.	"Burned Like a Rocket"	Gary Burr	3:40
2.	"I Miss You Already"	Marvin Rainwater, Faron Young	3:14
3.	"Love Has No Right"	Nelson Larkin, Billy Joe Royal, Randy Scruggs	3:04
4.	"Old Bridges Burn Slow"	Sanford Brown, Jerry Meaders, Joe South	3:28
5.	"Boardwalk Angel"	John Cafferty	3:34
6.	"I'll Pin a Note on Your Pillow"	Carol W. Berzas Jr., Don Goodman, Larkin	4:12
7.	"Till I Can't Take It Anymore"	Ulysses Burton, Clyde Otis	4:00
8.	"Tell It Like It Is"	George Davis, Lee Diamond	3:00
9.	"Out of Sight and on My Mind"	Bruce Burch, Rick Peoples	3:51
10.	"It Keeps Right On Hurtin'"	Johnny Tillotson	2:58

== Chart performance ==
Chart (1991)	Peak position
U.S. Billboard Top Country Albums	32
