= Out of the Shadows (Billy Joe Royal album) =

Studio album by Billy Joe Royal
- Released: June 1990
- Recorded: January 1990
- Studios: Scruggs Sound Studio and MasterMix (Nashville, Tennessee)
- Genre: Country
- Length: 36:34
- Label: Atlantic
- Producer: Nelson Larkin

Billy Joe Royal chronology
Tell It Like It Is (1989)	Out of the Shadows (1990)	Greatest Hits (1991)

Singles from Out of the Shadows
- 1. "Searchin' for Some Kind of Clue" Released: May 12, 1990; 2. "A Ring Where a Ring Used to Be" Released: November 17, 1990; 3. "If the Jukebox Took Teardrops" Released: January 26, 1991

Out of the Shadows is the eighth studio album by American country artist Billy Joe Royal, which was released in 1990.

The album landed on the Country Albums chart, reaching #24 in 1990.

== Track listing ==
No.	Title	Writer(s)	Length
1.	"Searchin' for Some Kind of Clue"	Donny Kees, Nelson Larkin, Pal Rakes	3:27
2.	"Before the Night Is Over"	Ben Peters	2:53
3.	"Old Friends Don't Make Good Lovers"	Ron Reynolds	3:08
4.	"There's a Method to My Sadness"	Kye Fleming, William Davidson	3:07
5.	"Free Me"	Walt Aldridge	4:16
6.	"From Lover to Lover"	Reynolds	3:35
7.	"How Could You Leave Me"	Bruce Channel, Ricky Ray Rector, Delbert McClinton	3:01
8.	"We Had Love"	Rakes, John Alexander	3:09
9.	"A Ring Where a Ring Used to Be"	Bob Moulds, Kris Bergsnes, Gordon Etherly	3:25
10.	"How Hard Can It Be"	Reynolds, John Easterling	2:59
11.	"If the Jukebox Took Teardrops"	Don Goodman, Larkin, Easterling, Michael Graham	3:34

== Personnel ==
- Billy Joe Royal – vocals
- Clayton Ivey – keyboards
- Larry Byrom – electric guitar
- Bill Hullett – acoustic guitar, electric guitar, sitar
- Brent Mason – electric guitar
- Ron "Snake" Reynolds – acoustic guitar, electric guitar, percussion, backing vocals
- Brent Rowan – electric guitar
- Sonny Garrish – dobro, steel guitar
- Bob Burns – bass
- Gary Lunn – bass
- Bob Wray – bass
- Jerry Kroon – drums, percussion
- Michael Black – backing vocals
- Chris Harris – backing vocals
- Harry Stinson – backing vocals
- Dennis Wilson – backing vocals
- Lonnie Wilson – backing vocals

=== Production ===
- Nelson Larkin – producer
- Ron "Snake" Reynolds – engineer
- Greg Parker – assistant engineer
- Hank Williams – mastering at MasterMix
- Bob Defrin – art direction
- Lynn Kowalewski – design
- Syd Rodocken – album title concept
- Jim "Señor" McGuire – photography

== Charts ==
=== Weekly charts ===
Chart (1990)	Peak position
US Top Country Albums (Billboard)	24

=== Year-end charts ===
Chart (1990)	Position
US Top Country Albums (Billboard)	73
