= Searchin' for Some Kind of Clue =

Single by Billy Joe Royal

from the album Out of the Shadows
- B-side: "This Too Shall Pass"
- Released: May 12, 1990
- Genre: Country
- Length: 3:27
- Label: Atlantic
- Songwriters: Nelson Larkin, Donny Kees, Pal Rakes
- Producer: Nelson Larkin

Billy Joe Royal singles chronology
"Till I Can't Take It Anymore" (1989)	"Searchin' for Some Kind of Clue" (1990)	"A Ring Where a Ring Used to Be" (1990)

"Searchin for Some Kind of Clue" is a song written by Nelson Larkin, Donny Kees and Pal Rakes, and recorded by American country music artist Billy Joe Royal. It was released in May 1990 as the first single from the album Out of the Shadows. The song reached number 17 on the Billboard Hot Country Singles & Tracks chart.

== Chart performance ==
Chart (1990)	Peak position
Canada Country Singles (RPM)	33
US Hot Country Songs (Billboard)	17
