= Heart's Desire =

Heart's Desire may refer to:

== Film and television ==
- Heart's Desire (1917 film), an American silent drama film
- Heart's Desire (1935 film), a British musical drama film
- Heart's Desire (1951 film), a West German drama film
- Heart's Desire (1960 film), a Swedish comedy film
- "Heart's Desire" (The Outer Limits), a television episode

== Music ==
- Heart's Desire (album), by Carol Sloane, 1992
- "Heart's Desire" (song), by Lee Roy Parnell, 1996
- "Heart's Desire", a song by Billy Joe Royal, 1966
- "Heart's Desire", a song by Don Blackman, 1982
- "Heart's Desire", a song by the Manhattan Transfer from The Manhattan Transfer, 1975
- "Heart's Desire", a song by Ron Sexsmith from Cobblestone Runway, 2002

== Places ==
- Heart's Desire, Newfoundland and Labrador, Canada, a town
- Heart's Desire Formation, a geologic formation in Newfoundland, Canada

== Other uses ==
- Heart's Desire (book), a 1988 essay collection by Edward Hoagland
- The Heart's Desire, a 2005 audio drama featuring the character Bernice Summerfield
