= Tell It Like It Is (Billy Joe Royal album) =

Studio album by Billy Joe Royal
- Released: January 31, 1989
- Studios: Scruggs Sound Studio, Creative Workshop and MasterMix (Nashville, Tennessee)
- Genre: Country
- Length: 36:11
- Label: Atlantic
- Producer: Nelson Larkin

Billy Joe Royal chronology
The Royal Treatment (1987)	Tell It Like It Is (1989)	Out of the Shadows (1990)

Singles from Tell It Like It Is
- 1. "Tell It Like It Is" Released: January 1989; 2. "Love Has No Right" Released: May 20, 1989; 3. "Till I Can't Take It Anymore" Released: September 30, 1989

Professional ratings
Review scores
Source	Rating
Allmusic	3/5 stars

Tell It Like It Is is the seventh studio album by American country music artist Billy Joe Royal. It was released on January 31, 1989 via Atlantic Records. The album peaked at number 15 on the Billboard Top Country Albums chart.

== Track listing ==
No.	Title	Writer(s)	Length
1.	"Tell It Like It Is"	George Davis, Lee Diamond	2:59
2.	"Kiss and Say Goodbye"	Winfred "Blue" Lovett	3:17
3.	"Slip Away"	Nelson Larkin, Pal Rakes, Ron Reynolds	3:13
4.	"He Don't Know"	Reynolds	2:51
5.	"Cross My Heart and Hope to Try"	John Alexander, Larkin, Rakes	2:57
6.	"Love Has No Right"	Larkin, Billy Joe Royal, Randy Scruggs	3:03
7.	"The Truth Is I Lied"	Donny Kees, Rakes, Richard Ross	2:55
8.	"Till I Can't Take It Anymore"	Ulysses Burton, Clyde Otis	4:00
9.	"I Was Losing You"	Bruce Burch	3:34
10.	"What's the Matter Baby"	Joy Byers, Otis	3:27
11.	"Love Is a Full Time Job"	Bobby Borchers, Bonnie Gallee, Pamela Wolfe	3:27

== Personnel ==
- Billy Joe Royal – vocals
- Clayton Ivey – keyboards
- Ron Oates – keyboards
- Ron "Snake" Reynolds – keyboards, acoustic guitar, electric guitar, percussion, backing vocals
- Bill Hullett – acoustic guitar, electric guitar
- Brent Rowan – electric guitar
- Billy Sanford – acoustic guitar
- Sonny Garrish – steel guitar
- Gary Lunn – bass
- Bob Wray – bass
- Roger Hawkins – drums
- Jerry Kroon – drums
- Jim Horn – saxophone
- Michael Black – backing vocals
- Larry Keith – backing vocals
- Kim Morrison – backing vocals
- Ken "Scat" Springs – backing vocals
- Hurshel Wiginton – backing vocals
- Dennis Wilson – backing vocals
- Lonnie Wilson – backing vocals
- Curtis Young – backing vocals

=== Production ===
- Nelson Larkin – producer
- Ronnie Brookshire – recording (1, 9, 11)
- Ron "Snake" Reynolds – remixing, recording (2–8, 10)
- Jeff Giedt – assistant engineer
- Hank Williams – mastering at MasterMix
- Bob Defrin – art direction
- Lynn Kowalewski – design
- Jeff Katz – photography
- Bobby Yarborough – liner notes

== Charts ==
=== Weekly charts ===
Chart (1989)	Peak position
Canadian Country Albums (RPM)	31
US Top Country Albums (Billboard)	15

=== Year-end charts ===
Chart (1989)	Position
US Top Country Albums (Billboard)	27
Chart (1990)	Position
US Top Country Albums (Billboard)	56
