= Down in the Boondocks =

Down in the Boondocks may refer to:

- "Down in the Boondocks" (song), a 1965 song by Billy Joe Royal
- Down in the Boondocks (album), a 1965 album by Billy Joe Royal
