= Greatest Love =

Greatest Love or The Greatest Love may refer to:

== Film and television ==
- The Greatest Love (1920 film), an American drama film directed by Henry Kolker
- The Greatest Love (2019 film), a Burmese romantic drama film
- The Greatest Love (South Korean TV series), a 2011 romantic comedy
- The Greatest Love (Philippine TV series), a 2016 melodrama

== Music ==
- "Greatest Love" (Ciara song), 2019
- The Greatest Love (album), by London Grammar, 2024
- The Greatest Love World Tour, a 1986 concert tour by Whitney Houston
- "Greatest Love", a song by Brotherhood of Man from B for Brotherhood, 1978
- "The Greatest Love", a song by Billy Joe Royal, 1967

== See also ==
- The Greatest Love of All (disambiguation)
- Her Greatest Love, a 1917 silent film
