= What's New (Linda Ronstadt album) =

Album by Linda Ronstadt

Studio album by Linda Ronstadt
- Released: September 12, 1983
- Recorded: June 30, 1982 – March 4, 1983
- Studios: The Complex, Los Angeles
- Genres: Traditional pop; lounge
- Length: 36:35
- Label: Asylum
- Producer: Peter Asher

Linda Ronstadt chronology
Get Closer (1982)	What's New (1983)	Lush Life (1984)

Singles from What's New
- 1. "What's New" Released: October 1983; 2. "I've Got a Crush on You" Released: January 1984; 3. "Someone to Watch Over Me" Released: April 1984

What's New is an album of traditional pop standards released by American singer Linda Ronstadt in 1983. It represents the first in a trilogy of 1980s albums Ronstadt recorded with arranger Nelson Riddle. John Kosh designed the album covers for all three albums.

== Production ==
The album was a major change in direction because Ronstadt was then considered the leading female vocalist in rock. Both her record company and manager, Peter Asher, were very reluctant to produce this album with Ronstadt, but eventually her determination won them over and the albums exposed a whole new generation to the sounds of the pre-swing and swing eras. The one-time popular music sung by Frank Sinatra, Ella Fitzgerald, Tony Bennett, Rosemary Clooney, Peggy Lee, and their contemporaries was relegated in the 1960s and 1970s to Las Vegas club acts and elevator music. Ronstadt later remarked that she did her part in rescuing these songs which she called "little jewels of artistic expression" from "spending the rest of their lives riding up and down on the elevators." The album's second single, "I've Got a Crush on You" had already been part of Ronstadt's repertoire for several years, as she'd performed it during a 1980 appearance on The Muppet Show.

== Reception ==
Professional ratings
Review scores
Source	Rating
AllMusic	2.5/5 stars
Robert Christgau	C−
Rolling Stone	3/5 stars
Time	4.5/5 stars

What's New was released in September 1983 and spent 81 weeks on the main Billboard album chart. Its release came as the radio programming format known as Adult Standards was taking off via programming concepts such as Music of Your Life, which specialized in returning pre-rock popular music and the songs of the Great American Songbook to the American airwaves. The album held the number 3 position for five consecutive weeks while Michael Jackson's Thriller and Lionel Richie's Can't Slow Down locked in the number 1 and number 2 album positions. The album also reached number 2 on the jazz albums chart. It was RIAA certified Triple Platinum for sales of over 3 million copies in the United States alone. Global sales surpassed five million. The album also earned Ronstadt another Grammy Award nomination for Best Pop Vocal Performance, Female alongside Donna Summer, Bonnie Tyler, Irene Cara and Sheena Easton, all of whom performed live on the 1984 Grammy telecast. Two singles, the title song and "I've Got a Crush on You," became hits on Adult Contemporary radio stations, with the title song also reaching number 53 on the Billboard Hot 100.

All tracks are also included in the compilation "'Round Midnight", released on Asylum Records in 1986.

Stephen Holden of The New York Times noted the significance of the album to popular culture when he wrote that What's New "isn't the first album by a rock singer to pay tribute to the golden age of pop, but is ... the best and most serious attempt to rehabilitate an idea of pop that Beatlemania and the mass marketing of rock LPs for teen-agers undid in the mid-60s. In the decade prior to Beatlemania, most of the great band singers and crooners of the 40s and 50s codified a half-century of American pop standards on dozens of albums, many of them now long out-of-print."

== Track listing ==
No.	Title	Writer(s)	Length
1.	"What's New?"	Johnny Burke, Bob Haggart	3:55
2.	"I've Got a Crush on You"	George Gershwin, Ira Gershwin	3:28
3.	"Guess I'll Hang My Tears Out to Dry"	Sammy Cahn, Jule Styne	4:13
4.	"Crazy He Calls Me"	Carl Sigman, Sidney Keith Russell	3:33
5.	"Someone to Watch Over Me"	George Gershwin, Ira Gershwin	4:09
6.	"I Don't Stand a Ghost of a Chance with You"	Bing Crosby, Ned Washington, Victor Young	4:06
7.	"What'll I Do"	Irving Berlin	4:06
8.	"Lover Man (Oh Where Can You Be?)"	Jimmy Davis, Jimmy Sherman, Roger "Ram" Ramirez	4:18
9.	"Goodbye"	Gordon Jenkins	4:47
Total length:			36:35

== Personnel ==
- Linda Ronstadt – vocals
- Don Grolnick – grand piano
- Tommy Tedesco – guitar (1–4, 6, 8-9)
- Dennis Budimir – guitar (5, 7)
- Ray Brown – bass guitar (1–4, 6, 8-9)
- Jim Hughart – bass guitar (5, 7)
- John Guerin – drums
- Tony Terran – trumpet solo (2)
- Chauncey Welsch – trombone solo (8)
- Plas Johnson – tenor sax solo (4)
- Bob Cooper – tenor sax solo (6-7)
- Nelson Riddle – arrangements and conductor
- Leonard Atkins – concertmaster
- Nathan Ross – concertmaster

== Production ==
- Peter Asher – producer
- George Massenburg – engineer, mixing
- Barbara Rooney – recording assistant, mix assistant
- Robert Spano – recording assistant, mix assistant
- Doug Sax – mastering at The Mastering Lab (Hollywood, California).
- Gloria Boyce – album coordinator
- John Kosh – art direction, design
- Ron Larson – art direction, design
- Brian Aris – photography
- Genny Schorr – wardrobe stylist

== Charts ==
=== Weekly charts ===
Chart (1983–84)	Peak position
Australia (Kent Music Report)	26
Canada Top Albums/CDs (RPM)	18
New Zealand Albums (RMNZ)	21
UK Albums (Official Charts)	31
US Billboard 200	3

=== Year-end charts ===
Chart (1984)	Position
Canada Top Albums/CDs (RPM)	93
US Billboard 200	13

== Certifications ==
Region	Certification	Certified units/sales
Canada (Music Canada)	Platinum	100,000^{^}
United States (RIAA)	3× Platinum	3,000,000^{^}
^{^} Shipments figures based on certification alone.

== Release history ==
Release history and formats for What's New
Region	Date	Format	Label	Ref.
North America	September 12, 1983	LP; cassette	Asylum Records	
