= The Royal Treatment =

The Royal Treatment may refer to:

- The Royal Treatment (album), a 1987 album by Billy Joe Royal
- The Royal Treatment (novel), a 2004 romance novel by MaryJanice Davidson
- The Royal Treatment (That's So Raven)
- The Royal Treatment (film), a 2022 film starring Laura Marano
