= Cherry Hill Park (album) =

Studio album by Billy Joe Royal
- Released: 1969
- Genre: Pop, country
- Label: Columbia
- Producer: Buddy Buie

Billy Joe Royal chronology
Down in the Boondocks (1965)	Cherry Hill Park (1969)	Billy Joe Royal (1980)

Singles from Cherry Hill Park
- 1. "Cherry Hill Park" Released: 3 June 1969

Professional ratings
Review scores
Source	Rating
Allmusic	3/5 stars

Cherry Hill Park is the third studio album by American singer Billy Joe Royal released in 1969, four years after his hit album Down in the Boondocks.

The song "Cherry Hill Park" hit #15 on The Billboard Hot 100. The album landed on The Billboard 200 chart, reaching #100 in 1970.

The Classics IV covered the title track and "Pick Up the Pieces" in 1970.

== Track listing ==
All tracks composed by Buddy Buie and James B. Cobb, Jr.; except where indicated

1. "You Can't Manufacture Love" (Marc Mathis, William Dees)
2. "Mama Song"
3. "Helping Hand"
4. "Ain't It the Truth"
5. "Down Home Lovin" (Billy Gilmore, Robert Nix)
6. "Cherry Hill Park" (Billy Gilmore, Robert Nix)
7. "Burning a Hole"
8. "If I Had It to Do Again"
9. "Pick Up the Pieces" (Billy Gilmore, Robert Nix)
10. "You Can Make Me Feel Good" (Billy Gilmore, Emory Gordy, Jr., Robert Nix)
11. "Children" (Joe South)
