= Edward Hoagland =

American author (1932–2026)

- Born: Edward Morley Hoagland; December 21, 1932; New York City, U.S.
- Died: February 17, 2026 (aged 93); New York City, U.S.
- Occupations: Essayist, novelist
- Writing career
- Genres: Nature, travel writing, literature

Edward Morley Hoagland (December 21, 1932 – February 17, 2026) was an American author best known for his nature and travel writing.

== Life and career ==
Edward Morley Hoagland was born in New York City on December 21, 1932. He attended Deerfield Academy and matriculated at Harvard University. He joined the Ringling Bros. and Barnum & Bailey Circus in the summers of 1951 and 1952. He helped tend the big cats and sold a novel about the experience, Cat Man (1955), before graduating from Harvard in 1954. After serving two years in the Army, he published The Circle Home (1960), a novel about boxing, before going on the first of nine trips to Alaska and British Columbia.

During the 1970s, he made the first two of his five trips to Africa. After receiving two Guggenheim Fellowships, he was elected to the American Academy of Arts and Letters in 1982. He taught at The New School, Rutgers, Sarah Lawrence, CUNY, the University of Iowa, U.C. Davis, Columbia University, Beloit College, and Brown University. In 2005, Hoagland retired from a teaching position at Bennington College. Starting in 1968, he focused mostly on Montaigne-type essays.

According to the Dictionary of Literary Biography,

Hoagland's love of solitude and silent observation of wildlife rather than social conversation may have resulted from a severe stammer that still persists. This stammer has, according to Hoagland himself, influenced how he writes: "Words are spoken at considerable cost to me, so a great value is placed on each one. That has had some effect on me as a writer. As a child, since I couldn't talk to people, I became close to animals. I became an observer, and in all my books, even the novels, witnessing things is what counts." His reluctance to speak may account for his desire to write—and be read—and for the sensitive visual, tactile, and olfactory images in his writings.

After retiring, Hoagland spent summers in Barton, Vermont, at a place he had owned since 1969, and winters in Martha's Vineyard. He died in Manhattan on February 17, 2026, aged 93.

== Critique ==
Hoagland's nonfiction was praised by writers and critics such as John Updike, who called him "the best essayist of my generation"; Philip Roth, who called him "America’s most intelligent and wide-ranging essayist-naturalist"; and Alfred Kazin, who said he "writes for magazines on all manner of topics with regular, predictable brilliance".

== Bibliography ==
Books

- Cat Man, Houghton Mifflin, 1956; NAL, 1958; Ballantine, 1973; Arbor House, 1984; Lyons Press, 2003
- The Circle Home, Thomas Y. Crowell, 1960; Avon, 1977; Lyons Press, 2003
- The Peacock's Tail, McGraw-Hill, 1965
- Notes from the Century Before: A Journal from British Columbia, Random House, 1969; Ballantine, 1972; North Point Press, 1982; Sierra Club Books, 1995; Modern Library, 2002
- The Courage of Turtles, Random House, 1971; Warner, 1974; North Point Press, 1985; Lyons & Burford, 1993
- Walking the Dead Diamond River, Random House, 1973; Warner, 1974; North Point Press, 1985; Lyons & Burford, 1993
- The Moose on the Wall, Barrie & Jenkins, 1974
- Red Wolves and Black Bears, Random House, 1976; Penguin, 1983; Lyons & Burford, 1995
- African Calliope: A Journey to the Sudan, Random House, 1979; Penguin, 1981; Lyons & Burford, 1995
- The Edward Hoagland Reader, Random House, 1979; Vintage, 1981
- The Tugman's Passage, Random House, 1982; Penguin, 1983; Lyons & Burford, 1995
- City Tales, Capra Press, 1986
- Seven Rivers West, Simon & Schuster, 1986; Penguin, 1987; Lyons Press, 2003
- Heart's Desire, Simon & Schuster, 1988; Collins Harville, 1990; Touchstone, 1991
- The Final Fate of the Alligators, Capra Press, 1992
- Balancing Acts, Simon & Schuster, 1992, Touchstone, 1993; Lyons Press, 1999
- Tigers & Ice, Lyons Press, 1999
- Compass Points, Pantheon, 2001; Vintage, 2002
- Hoagland on Nature, Lyons Press, 2003
- Early in the Season, Douglas & McIntyre, 2008
- Sex and the River Styx, Chelsea Green Publishing, 2011
- Alaskan Travels, Arcade Publishing, 2012
- Children Are Diamonds, Arcade Publishing, 2013

Short stories

- "Cowboys," The Noble Savage, No. 1, February 1960
- "The Last Irish Fighter," Esquire, August 1960
- "The Witness," The Paris Review, Summer-Fall 1967
- "The Colonel's Power," New American Review, No. 2, January 1968
- "Kwan's Coney Island," New American Review, No. 5, January 1969
- "A Fable of Mammas," Transatlantic Review, No. 32, Summer 1969
- "The Final Fate of the Alligators," The New Yorker, October 18, 1969
- "Seven Rivers West," Esquire, July 1986
- "The Mind's Eye," The Nature of Nature, (ed. Wm. Shore), Harcourt, 1994
- "The Devil's Tub," The Yale Review, Autumn, 2005
- "Triage Along the Nile," Conjunctions, Fall 2008
- "In Africa," New Letters, vol. 74, Fall 2008

Essays

- "The Big Cats," Esquire, April 1961
- "The Draft Card Gesture," Commentary, February 1968
- "Notes from the Century Before," The Paris Review, Winter 1968
- "On Not Being a Jew," Commentary, April 1968
- "The Threshold and the Jolt of Pain," The Village Voice, October 17, 1968
- "The Courage of Turtles," The Village Voice, December 12, 1968
- "The Elephant Trainer and the Man on Stilts," The Village Voice, April 17, 1969
- "Why this Extra Violence," The Village Voice, May 8, 1969
- "Knights and Squires: For Love of the Tugs," The Village Voice, May 29, 1969
- "The Problem of the Golden Rule," Commentary, August 1969
- "Blitzes and Holding Actions," The Village Voice, October 16, 1969
- "Books, Movies, the News," Book World, November 9, 1969
- "Home is Two Places," Commentary, February 1970
- "The Circus in 1970," The Village Voice, April 9, 1970
- "The Moose on the Wall," New American Review, No. 9, April 1970
- "Americana by the Acre," Harper's, October 1970
- "Meatcutters Are a Funny Bunch," The Village Voice, December 17, 1970
- "The Portland Freight Run," The Atlantic, February 1971
- "The War in the Woods," Harper's, February 1971
- "Splendid, with Trumpets," The Village Voice, April 8, 1971
- "Two Clowns," Life, April 25, 1971
- "The Assassination Impulse," The Village Voice, May 27, 1971
- "Of Cows and Cambodia," The Atlantic, July 1971
- "The Soul of the Tiger," Esquire, July 1971
- "Hailing the Elusory Mountain Lion," The New Yorker, August 7, 1971
- "Jane Street's Samurai," The Village Voice, November 25, 1971
- "Nobody Writes Stories about Unicorns," The Village Voice, December 16, 1971
- "Passions and Tensions," The Village Voice, February 2, 1972
- "On the Question of Dogs," The Village Voice, March 30, 1972
- "City Rat," Audience, March–April 1972
- "Women Aflame," The Village Voice, April 27, 1972
- "Marriage, Fame, Power, Success," The Village Voice, May 18, 1972
- "In the Toils of the Law," The Atlantic, June 1972
- "Looking for Wilderness," The Atlantic, August 1972
- "Thoughts on Returning to the Mountain..." The Village Voice, November, 1972
- "Heart's Desire," Audience, November–December 1972
- "Howling Back at the Wolves," Saturday Review, December 1972
- "Wall Maps and Woodpeckers," The Village Voice, January 25, 1973
- "Fred King on the Allagash," Audience, January–February 1973
- "Mountain Towers," The Village Voice, February 15, 1973
- "At Pinkham Notch," The Village Voice, March 15, 1973
- "Wildlands in Vermont," The Village Voice, March 22, 1973
- "In a Lair with a Bear," Sports Illustrated, March 26, 1973
- "Tricks, Innocence, Pathos, Perfection," The Village Voice, May 10, 1973
- "The Young Must Do the Healing," New York Times Magazine, June 10, 1973
- "Other Lives," Harper's, July 1973
- "A Run of Bad Luck," Newsweek, July 30, 1973
- "Writing Wild," New York Times Book Review, September 23, 1973
- "That Gorgeous Great Novelist," The Village Voice, November 15, 1973
- "But Where Is Home," New York Times Book Review, December 23, 1973
- "A Mountain with a Wolf on It," Sports Illustrated, January 14, 1974
- "Where Have All the Heroes Gone," New York Times Magazine, March 10, 1974
- "Where the Action Is," New York Times Book Review, October 13, 1974
- "Nine Home Truths about Writing," The Village Voice, January 20, 1975
- "The Tug of Life at the End of the Leash," Harper's, February 1975
- "Big Frog, Very Small Pond," Sports Illustrated, March 3, 1975
- "The Survival of the Newt," New York Times Magazine, July 27, 1975
- "Apocalypse Enough," Not Man Apart, July 1975
- "A Paradox among Us," Harper's, January 1976
- "Southern Mansions," Travel & Leisure, February 1976
- "What I Think, What I Am," New York Times Book Review, June 27, 1976
- "Cairo Observed," Harper's, June 1976
- "At Large in East Africa," Harper's, August 1976
- "The Fragile Writer," New York Times Book Review, December 12, 1976
- "The Ridge-Slope Fox and the Knife-Thrower," Harper's, January 1977
- "Do Writers Stay Home," New York Times Book Review, May 22, 1977
- "Without American Express," New York Times Book Review, June 4, 1978
- "Into Eritrea: Africa's Red Sea War," Harper's, July 1978
- "Unsilent Spring," The Nation, May 26, 1979
- "Gabriel, Who Wanted to Know," The New England Review, Summer 1979
- "Tugs," Harper's, December 1979
- "Johnny Appleseed," American Heritage, December–January 1979
- "Being Between Books," New York Times Book Review, October 28, 1979
- "December Song," The Nation, December 6, 1980
- "America Was Promises (Still)," The Nation, February 21, 1981
- "Making of a Writer," New York Times Book Review, October 4, 1981
- "Gods, Masks, and Horses," Vanity Fair, July 1983
- "Anchorage," Vanity Fair, October 1983
- "Up the Black to Chalkyitsik," House and Garden, June 1984
- "Hail the Anhinga," The Nation, June 9, 1984
- "Memories of Circuses Past," The Nation, March 9, 1985
- "In Okefenokee," National Geographic Traveler, Spring 1985
- "Nectar Feeding," The Nation, July 20, 1985
- "In Praise of John Muir," Antaeus, Autumn 1986
- "Three Trains Across Canada," Travel & Leisure, March 1987
- "Up with Spring," The Nation, June 6, 1987
- "Treasured Places," Life, July 1987
- "Summer Skunks," The Nation, August 29, 1987
- "Christmases Past," The Nation, December 26, 1987
- "Heaven and Nature," Harper's, March 1988
- "Arabia Felix," Interview magazine, May 1988
- "The Indispensable Thoreau," American Heritage, July 1988
- "Learning to Eat Soup," Antaeus, Autumn 1988
- "The Hunger in Manhattan Life," Harper's, June 1989
- "Jubilant Spring," The Nation, June 19, 1989
- "A World Worth Saving," Life, October 1989
- "O Wyoming," Outside, October 1989
- "Tolstoyan Tide," The Nation, May 14, 1990
- "Shh, Our Writers Are Sleeping," Esquire, July 1990
- "On Getting One's Footing" (reprinted from "Anxious Dreams", Manchester Guardian, January 20), Harper's, August 1990
- "Roadless Regions," Literary Outtakes, September 1990
- "Passing Views," Harper's, January 1991
- "Good Trips, Bad Trips," Outside, April 1991
- "The Best Idea," Life, May 1991
- "Spring Medley," The Nation, June 10, 1991
- "Holy Fools," The Nation, September 16, 1991
- "Everybody Comes to Belize," Outside, February 1992
- "Meat for the Old Man," Outside, May 1992
- "Christmas Observed," New York Times Magazine, December 20, 1992
- "To the Point," Harper's, March 1993
- "Skin and Bones," The Nation, May 3, 1993
- "The Unknown Thoreau," The Nation, June 7, 1993
- "Nature's Seesaw," Vermont, May 1994 (also in Land's End Catalogue, September 1993)
- "All This Good World," Manoa, June 1994
- "Strange Perfume," Esquire, June 1994
- "The View from 61," New York Times Magazine, November 27, 1994
- "Brightness Visible," Harper's, January 1995
- "Surge Time at the Bottom of the Earth," Outside, March 1995
- "Scenes from a Forty-Year War," The Nation, April 10, 1995
- "Like a Saul Bellow Character," Salmagundi, Spring 1995
- "Stepping Back," New York Times Magazine, November 12, 1995
- "Books that Need Authors," The Nation, November 13, 1995
- "The Daring Art of Rockwell Kent," Civilization, January 1996
- "Dying Argots," Harper's, January 1996
- "Running Mates," Hungry Mind Review, November 1996 (also Spring 1999)
- "Generational Pioneer," New York Times Magazine, December 8, 1996
- "A Last Look Around," Civilization, February 1997
- "The Peaceable Kingdom," Preservation, March 1997 (also in Vermont, June 1999)
- "Wild Things," Granta, Spring 1997
- "Samos, Reflections on Love, and Love Lost, On a Greek Island," Islands, June 1997
- "Henry James and Porky Pig," The Nation, June 30, 1997
- "The Sage of Selborne," The Yale Review, July 1997
- "Spring Comes to the Kingdom," Vermont Woodlands, Spring 1998
- "I Can See," Granta, Summer 1998
- "India," River City, Summer 1998
- "Vermont Journal," American Scholar, Summer 1998
- "Vermont: Suite of Seasons," National Geographic, September 1998
- "Lost Between Burma and Tibet," Outside, October 1998
- Craft and Obsession: An Interview with Edward Hoagland," The Hungry Mind Review, Spring 1999
- "On the Lure of Water," Sierra, May 1999
- "Writers Afoot," American Scholar, Summer 1999
- "Earth's Eye," Northern Woodlands, Autumn 1999
- "That Sense of Falling," Preservation, October 1999
- "Writers Afoot," Harper's, October 1999
- "Calliope Times," The New Yorker, May 22, 2000
- "Natural Excursions," Orion, Summer 2000
- "Fire," American Scholar, Autumn 2000
- "Natural Light," Harper's, October 2000
- "Vermont's Civil Union," Washington Post, late October 2000
- "Secrets of the Stutter," U.S. News & World Report, April 2, 2001
- "Smirko, Smirko, Smirko!" Yankee, June 2001
- "Two Kinds of People," Worth, November 2001
- "Circus Music," Harper's, February 2002
- "Ansel Adams at 100," Aperture, Spring 2002
- "John Muir's Alaskan Rhapsody," American Scholar, Spring 2002
- "Blind Faith," Food and Wine, April 2002
- "1776 and All That," The Nation, July 22, 2002
- "Diaries," The Paris Review, Summer 2002
- "The Circus of Dr. Lao," Post Road, Fall 2002
- "Not Even the Giant Squid," Harper's, November 2002
- "Sex and the River Styx," Harper's, January 2003
- "The American Dissident," Harper's, August 2003
- "Immersion Teaching," Chronicle of Higher Education, February 13, 2004
- "Small Silences," Harper's, July 2004
- "Journals," American Scholar, Autumn 2004
- "The Glue Is Gone," American Scholar, Winter 2005
- "Miles from Nowhere," American Scholar, Summer 2006
- "Endgame: Meditations on a Diminishing World," Harper's, June 2007
- "Children Are Diamonds," Portland, Fall 2007
- "The Broken Balance," The American Scholar, Spring 2008
- "A Country for Old Men," The American Scholar, Winter 2009
- "Curtain Calls," Harper's, March 2009
- "China's Mystic Waters," National Geographic, March 2009
- "Journals '04, '05," The Seattle Review, Fall 2009
- "Barley and Yaks," Orion, November 2009
- "Last Call – Old Age and the End of Nature," Harper's, May 2010
- "Spaced Out in the City," American Scholar, Summer 2010
- "When I Was Blind," Portland Magazine, Summer 2011
- "The Gravity of Falling," The American Scholar, Winter 2012
- "The Top of the Continent," Portland Magazine, Winter 2012
- "On Friendship," The American Scholar, Winter 2013
- "Pity Earth's Creatures," The New York Times, March 23, 2013

Other essays

- Commencing from March 12, 1979, fifty-plus unsigned editorials in The New York Times: "The Price of Fur," "In the Spring," "Hang-ups," "Mountain House," etc., to 1989
- Pequod, Winter 1986
- New England Monthly, May 1987
- Yankee Homes, September 1989
- Manchester Guardian, January 20, 1990; August 12, 1990; March 31, 1991
- Anchorage Daily News, June 28, 1992
- Vermont, June 1994
- The New York Times, January 11, 1986; June 15, 1991; October 5, 1993; May 13, 1995
- Rolling Stone, May 28, 1998
- Manoa, June 1999
- Portland Magazine (Oregon), Summer 1996; Winter 1996; Winter 1997; Spring 2002
- The Vineyard Gazette, November 9, 2012

Book reviews

- In The New York Times Book Review, May 9, 1971; June 13, 1971; February 6, 1972; October 7, 1973; October 21, 1973; December 2, 1973; April 14, 1974; May 19, 1974; "City Walking," June 1, 1975; June 22, 1975; November 9, 1975; December 7, 1975; April 11, 1976; April 18, 1976; May 9, 1976; August 15, 1976; September 5, 1976; November 14, 1976; January 9, 1977; June 19, 1977; August 14, 1977; September 11, 1977; November 27, 1977; December 11, 1977; November 19, 1978; November 26, 1978; January 21, 1979; February 4, 1979; June 24, 1979; July 22, 1979; March 23, 1980; March 30, 1980; June 8, 1980; August 17, 1980; March 15, 1981; November 8, 1981; June 6, 1982; August 29, 1982; October 17, 1982; November 21, 1982; June 12, 1983; January 22, 1984; October, 1984; February 16, 1986; July 19, 1987; September 11, 1988; January 8, 1989; May 7, 1989; March 18, 1990; November 25, 1990; July 2, 2000
- In The Boston Herald, December 20, 1970
- In The Village Voice, December 30, 1971; October 24, 1974; October 1982
- In The Chicago Daily News, December 1, 1974
- In Life, October 14, 1971; April 21, 1972; October 27, 1972
- In Harper's Book Letter, May 12, 1975
- In Harper's, July 1977; May 1985; January 1986; February 1989
- In Saturday Review, April 28, 1979, December 1980
- In New York magazine, May 28, 1979
- In The New Republic, October 20, 1979; March 1, 1980
- In Washington Post Book World, April 12, 1970; June 6, 1970; October 30, 1972; June 15, 1980; October 11, 1981; August 2, 1987
- In Inside Sports, November 1980
- In Science Digest, October 1981
- In Chicago Tribune, November 6, 1988
- In Wigwag, October–November–December 1989
- In USA Today, October 23, 1992; November 13, 1992; January 21, 1994
- In Boston Globe, November 19, 1995; April 19, 1997
- In Los Angeles Times, September 22, 1996
- In Civilization, November 1994; March 1995; July 1995; October 1997
- In Onearth, October 2004
- "Here He Is, On the Prowl," in "William James in His Time and Ours," Harvard Library Bulletin, Volume 20, Number 2

Other work

- General editor of the Penguin Nature Library; later called the Penguin Nature Classics series: thirty volumes in all, 1985 on: Bartram, Beston, Austin, Bates, Catlin, Audubon, Thoreau, Muir, Powell, Warner, White, Seton, Lewis and Clark, Prishvin, King, etc., introduced by Stegner, Updike, Theroux, Dickey, Barth, Turner, Abbey, McKibben, Shoumatoff, Ehrlich, Nelson, Berry, Matthiessen, et al.

Introductions written for:

- The Circus of Dr. Lao, by Charles G. Finney, Vintage, 1983
- The Mountains of California, by John Muir, Penguin, 1985
- The Maine Woods, by Henry David Thoreau, Penguin, 1988
- Vanishing Arctic, by T. M. Watkins, Aperture Books, 1988
- The Pushcart Prize XVI, Best of the Small Presses, edited by Bill Henderson, 1991
- Walden, by Henry David Thoreau, Vintage, 1991
- Steep Trails, by John Muir, Sierra Club Books, 1994
- Land of Rivers, by Peter Mancall, Cornell University Press, 1996
- N by E, by Rockwell Kent, Wesleyan University Press, 1996
- The Natural History of Selborne, by Gilbert White, Penguin, 1997
- The Best American Essays 1999, edited by Edward Hoagland, Houghton Mifflin, 1999
- Elevating Ourselves, by Henry David Thoreau, Houghton Mifflin, 1999
- Our Like Will Not Be There Again, by Lawrence Hillman, Ruminator Books, 2001
- The Shameless Diary of an Explorer, by Robert Dunn, Modern Library, 2001
- Shooting Blind, by Visually Impaired Collective, Aperture Books, 2002
- Step Right This Way, by Edward J. Kelty, Barnes & Noble Books, 2002
- Travels in Alaska, by John Muir, Modern Library, 2002
- Interview, Agni 62, Fall 2005

Contributor to large-format books:

- Our World's Heritage, National Geographic Society, 1987
- Paths Less Traveled, Atheneum, 1988
- Favorite Places, a Travel & Leisure Book, 1989
- Heart of a Nation, National Geographic Society, 2000

Other:

- In numerous anthologies.
- Houghton Mifflin Literary Fellowship, 1954; Longview Foundation Award, 1961; Prix de Rome, 1964; Guggenheim Fellowship, 1965; New York State Arts Council grant, 1972; Brandeis University Citation in Literature, 1972; Guggenheim Fellowship, 1975; Harold Vursell Award of American Academy of Arts and Letters, 1981; National Endowment for the Arts grant, 1982; Lannan Foundation Award, 1993.
- Nominated for National Book Award, 1974; National Book Critics Circle Award, 1980; American Book Award, 1982; New York Public Library Literary Lion, 1988 and 1996; National Magazine Award, 1989; Boston Public Library Literary Light, 1995. Elected to American Academy and Institute of Arts and Letters, 1982.
- Has juried competitions for the J.S. Guggenheim Foundation, New York State Arts Council
- Virginia Commission for the Arts, Oregon State Arts Council, Breadloaf Foundation, American Academy of Arts and Letters, etc.
- Elected to the American Academy of Arts and Sciences, 2011
- John Burroughs Medal, 2012
