= I've Got to Be Somebody =

Single by Billy Joe Royal

from the album Down in the Boondocks
- B-side: "You Make Me Feel Like A Man"
- Released: 1965
- Genre: Rock
- Length: 2:59
- Label: Columbia Records 43465
- Songwriter(s): Joe South

Billy Joe Royal singles chronology
"I Knew You When" (1965)	"I've Got to Be Somebody" (1965)	"It's a Good Time" (1966)

"I've Got to Be Somebody" is a song written by Joe South and was recorded by Billy Joe Royal for his 1965 album, Down in the Boondocks. It was released as a single in December 1965 and the song reached #38 on The Billboard Hot 100 in January 1966. The song reached #15 on the Canadian chart the same month.

Joe South later released a version of the song.
