= Love Has No Right =

Single by Billy Joe Royal

from the album Tell It Like It Is
- B-side: "Cross My Heart and Hope to Die"
- Released: May 20, 1989
- Genre: Country music
- Length: 3:03
- Label: Atlantic
- Songwriters: Billy Joe Royal, Nelson Larkin, Randy Scruggs
- Producer: Nelson Larkin

Billy Joe Royal singles chronology
"Tell It Like It Is" (1989)	"Love Has No Right" (1989)	"Till I Can't Take It Anymore" (1989)

"Love Has No Right" is a song co-written and recorded by American country music artist Billy Joe Royal. It was released in May 1989 as the second single from the album Tell It Like It Is. The song reached number 4 on the Billboard Hot Country Singles & Tracks chart. It was written by Royal, Nelson Larkin and Randy Scruggs.

== Chart performance ==
Chart (1989)	Peak position
Canada Country Singles (RPM)	3
US Hot Country Songs (Billboard)	4

=== Year-end charts ===
Chart (1989)	Position
Canada Country Tracks (RPM)	34
US Country Songs (Billboard)	49
