= Dean & Jean =

American musical duo

Dean & Jean was the singing duo of Welton Young and Brenda Lee Jones. They recorded top 40 pop music hits "Hey Jean, Hey Dean" and "Tra La La La Suzy" which was covered in the 1970s by Price Mitchell and charted on the country charts. They appeared under their given names on various albums in support of other artists. Their song "Wanna Be Loved” also charted. They recorded with Rust Records and a few other labels. They lived in Dayton, Ohio. They eventually disbanded ca. 1968 and both are now deceased.

== Discography ==
- "Hey Jean, Hey Dean" (1963) #27 in Australia
- "I Wanna Be Loved" (1964)
