= Price Mitchell =

- Genres: County
- Occupations: Singer
- Labels: Brylen, Prize, GRT, Sunbird Records, Sunset

Price Mitchell is an American country music singer. He had six songs that made it onto the national country music charts in the 1970s and one album that charted. He recorded on Prize Records in 1971. He also released 45s and albums with GRT Records and then (after that label went bankrupt) on Sunbird Records as well as on Sunset Records (American label). His hits included "Personality" that reached #29 in April-May 1975. It was cover of the 1959 Lloyd Price Pop/R&B hit. Mitchell's duet with Jerri Kelly "I Can't Help Myself (Sugar Pie Honey Bunch)" reached #65 in 1975, a cover of The Four Tops 1965 Pop/R&B hit.

== Discography ==
=== 45s ===
- "I Might As Well Be Home" b/w "Mr. And Mrs. Untrue" on Prize 98-10 (1971)
- "Laying Here Lying" b/w "Tonight She'll Make Me Happy" on Cartwheel A-217 (1972)
- "Somewhere In The Wee Small Hours" b/w "Small Enough To Crawl" on Metromedia Country 68-0109 (1973)
- "Daddy's Going Bye-Bye" b/w "I'm A Fool For Leaving" on Metromedia Country 0189
- "Is It Too Late To Try?" b/w "I Can't Be Here" on GRT 005 (1974)
- "Saving It All For You b/w "Mr. And Mrs. Untrue (re-recording) on GRT 029
- "Seems Like I Can't Live With You, But I Can't Live Without You b/w (I Wanna Be) The Man Who Takes You Home GRT 037 (1976) reached #83 on the charts
- "Tra-La-La-La Suzy" b/w "Sweet Molly Brown" on GRT 050 (1976) reached # 75, a cover of the 1964 Pop hit for Dean & Jean
- "You're The Reason I'm Living" b/w Take Me Back on GRT 067 (1976) reached #75 on the country chart, a cover of Bobby Darin's 1963 hit, also finished at # 75
- "What Would I Do Then?" b/w "You Do Something Special To Me" GRT 138
- "Mr. And Mrs. Untrue" (1989) re-release as on Sunbirdas a duet with Rene Sloane reached # 45 b/w "Savin' It All For You", Sunbird 10
- "Tonight She`ll Make Me Happy" b/w "Seasons Of My Heart" on Kreative Kountry 101

=== Albums ===
- "Mr. Country Soul", album, (GRT 8008) with 1. "Personality" 2. "You're The Reason I'm Living;" 3. "Tra-La-La-La Suzy" 4. "Small Enough To Crawl" 5. "You Do Something Special To Me" 6. "Burning Bridges" 7. "Sweet Molly Brown" 8. "Seems Like I Can't Live With You, But I Can't Live Without You" 9. "I Want To Be The Man Who Takes You Home" 10. "Take Me Back" (1976) on GRT and re-released (1981) on Sunbird (ST 50108) as "The Best Of Price Mitchell". Re-released again in 1982 as "Can't Live With You" on Brylen BN-4402
