= Down in the Boondocks (song) =

1965 single by Billy Joe Royal

Single by Billy Joe Royal

from the album Down in the Boondocks
- B-side: "Oh, What a Night"
- Released: May 24, 1965
- Studio: The Gearhart Building (Atlanta)
- Genre: Country rock
- Length: 2:32
- Label: Columbia 43305
- Songwriter: Joe South
- Producer: Joe South

Billy Joe Royal singles chronology
"Down in the Boondocks" (1965)	"I Knew You When" (1965)

"Down in the Boondocks" is a song written by Joe South, and first recorded by American artist Billy Joe Royal as his debut single. It was a hit in 1965, reaching No. 9 on the Billboard Hot 100 chart. In the UK, it hit No. 38 on the Record Retailer chart. In Canada, it reached No. 1 on the RPM chart, on August 9, 1965. It reached #1 on the New Zealand Lever Hit Parade Chart. The song is the title track of Royal's debut album, Down in the Boondocks.

== Content ==
The song is sung from the perspective of a self-proclaimed "boy from down in the boondocks." He sings of a girl who lives nearby, for whom he feels love and steals away with occasionally. The people who live or are born in the boondocks are suggested to be a lower class than those in the city. The girl's father is the singer's boss, which, along with the social division, prevents him from proclaiming his love and connecting with her, despite their shared feelings (which is the basis for the line "but I don't dare knock on her door/for her daddy is my boss man"). The singer proclaims that "one fine day, I'll find a way, to move from this old shack", presumably to be able to join the higher class members of society and finally be able to date the girl openly. Essentially the same theme appeared some twenty months earlier in the lyrics of Joey Powers' "Midnight Mary".

== Original version ==
In the summer of 1965, "Down in the Boondocks" launched the top 40 career of Billy Joe Royal, who had recorded the song a year earlier. The song's writer, Joe South, was a longtime friend and professional associate of Royal: South had played guitar for Royal since the singer had begun performing in local venues at age 14, and from 1961 South had produced Royal's recordings of demos and low-budget singles. Some claim Royal's recording of "Down in the Boondocks" was intended to serve as a demo to pitch the song to Gene Pitney, the song being evocative of Pitney's trademark hit sound with an especial resemblance to Pitney's 1963 hit "Twenty Four Hours from Tulsa": Bill Lowery, South's music publisher and Royal's manager, was so impressed with Royal's own recording of "Down in the Boondocks" as to pursue a major label release for it. Royal himself would deny any intent to pitch the song to Pitney - (Billy Joe Royal quote:)"We would've never [been able to get] a song to him...Our plan was [for Royal] to try to sing like Gene Pitney...We were so young, we thought: 'Well they'll think it's Gene Pitney, and by the time they know it's [not, it'll already be] a hit'".

"Down in the Boondocks" was recorded in a four hour session at the Gearhart Building, the converted schoolhouse in Buckhead which housed Bill Lowery's business headquarters, the school's auditorium serving as a recording studio: (Billy Joe Royal quote:)"We cut it on a three-track machine - the most primitive thing in the world. How it sounded like a record I don't know": "We put a microphone down a septic tank and ran that through the recording for the echo." Session musicians included Reggie Young on electric guitar, Bill Hullett on acoustic guitar, Sam Levine on horns, Clayton Ivey on piano, Bob Wray on six string bass, Greg Morrow on drums, and Freddy Weller on rhythm guitar/background vocals. The session also yielded the original torch song "I Knew You When", plus, to serve as potential B-sides, covers of the hits "Oh, What a Night" (the Dells) and "Steal Away" (Jimmy Hughes).

Royal considered "I Knew You When" - reminiscent of the Righteous Brothers' recent smash hits - as more likely than "Down in the Boondocks" to be picked up by a major label ("I Knew You When" would in fact be optioned by Vee Jay Records to be recorded by Wade Flemons with an August 1964 single release). However Bill Lowery saw the hit potential of "Down in the Boondocks", personally visiting Los Angeles to pitch the track to major labels: after Warner Bros. and Capitol Records passed, Columbia Records released "Down in the Boondocks" - backed by "Oh, What a Night" - in the spring of 1965.

"Down in the Boondocks" "broke out" at WCPO in Cincinnati, where Royal had been living for two years when South had phoned Royal inviting him back to Atlanta to record "Down in the Boondocks": (Billy Joe Royal quote:)"It became number one overnight in Cincinnati, because I’d been doing sock hops with local disc jockeys. Then it became a hit in Savannah - where Royal had spent two years headlining the iconic local club the Bamboo Ranch - "then, it went crazy everywhere else." "Down in the Boondocks" rose to number 9 on the Billboard Hot 100 dated 28 August 1965. Reaching number one on the Canadian hit parade published by RPM magazine, "Down in the Boondocks" also reached number 10 on the singles chart for Australia. Despite Royal making a three-day promotional visit to London in September 1965, "Down in the Boondocks" failed to become a major UK Singles Chart hit, stalling at number 38.

== Notable remakes ==
"Down in the Boondocks"

Single by Freddy Weller

from the album Listen to the Young Folks
- B-side: "Amarillo, Texas"
- Released: September 22, 1969
- Studio: CBS Recording Studio (Hollywood)
- Genre: Country rock
- Length: 2:24
- Label: Columbia 4-45026
- Songwriter: Joe South
- Producer: Mark Lindsay

Freddy Weller singles chronology
"These Are Not My People" (1969)	"Down in the Boondocks" (1969)	"I Shook the Hand" (1970)

"Down in the Boondocks" became a top 30 hit on the C&W chart in Billboard in 1969-70 via a remake by Freddy Weller who had been a sideman on the Billy Joe Royal recording. After reaching the Top 5 C&W with versions of two other Joe South compositions: "Games People Play" and "These Are Not My People", Weller was only afforded moderate chart success with his version of "Down in the Boondocks" which peaked at number 25 C&W, a concurrent version of the song by Penny DeHaven which reached number 37 C&W shadowing Weller's version throughout its chart tenure.

"Down in the Boondocks" has also been recorded by the Spokesmen (album Dawn of Correction, 1965), Del Reeves (Doodle-Oo-Doo-Doo, 1965), Gary Lewis & the Playboys (album She's Just My Style, 1966), the Three Degrees (single, 1969), Peggy Sue (album All American Husband, 1970), Lynn Anderson (album I'm Alright, 1970), Liz Anderson (Husband Hunting, 1970), Lawanda Lindsey & Kenny Vernon (album Pickin' Wild Mountain Berries, 1970), New Riders of the Purple Sage (album New Riders of the Purple Sage, 1971), Kenny Loggins (album Nightwatch, 1978), Ry Cooder (album Borderline, 1980), and Johnny Rodriguez (album Foolin' With Fire, 1984).
