= Looking Ahead (Billy Joe Royal album) =

Studio album by Billy Joe Royal
- Released: 1987
- Studios: Emerald Sound Studios, Sound Emporium Studios, Woodland Sound Studios and Young 'Un Sound (Nashville, Tennessee)
- Genres: Country; Rock
- Length: 40:13
- Label: Atlantic
- Producer: Nelson Larkin

Billy Joe Royal chronology
Billy Joe Royal (1980)	Looking Ahead (1987)	The Royal Treatment (1987)

Singles from Looking Ahead
- 1. "Burned Like a Rocket" Released: October 26, 1985; 2. "I Miss You Already (And You're Not Even Gone)" Released: August 23, 1986; 3. "Old Bridges Burn Slow" Released: February 7, 1987

Professional ratings
Review scores
Source	Rating
Allmusic	3/5 stars

Looking Ahead is the fifth studio album by American artist Billy Joe Royal, released in 1987.

Three singles from this album charted on the Country Singles chart. The first was "Burned Like a Rocket", which peaked at #10. This was followed by "I Miss You Already" (#14) and "Old Bridges Burn Slow" (#11).

The album also landed on the Country Albums chart, reaching #23.

== Track listing ==
No.	Title	Writer(s)	Length
1.	"Burned Like a Rocket"	Gary Burr	3:35
2.	"Run Around Town"	Buddy Buie, Burr, Ronnie Hammond	3:13
3.	"Old Bridges Burn Slow"	Sanford Brown, Jerry Meadors, Joe South	3:28
4.	"Good Thing"	Len Chera, Bob Morrison	2:35
5.	"The Hard Times"	Joe Iantosca, Rick Iantosca	3:10
6.	"I'm Not a Rock (I'm a Rolling Stone)"	Don Goodman, John Wesley Ryles, Mark Sherrill	3:03
7.	"Boardwalk Angel"	John Cafferty	3:45
8.	"Sad Cliches"	Buie, Hammond	3:14
9.	"You'd Better Go"	Buie, Burr, Hammond	4:03
10.	"I Miss You Already"	Marvin Rainwater, Faron Young	3:!3
11.	"We've Both Got a Lot to Learn"	Buie, Burr, Hammond	3:06
12.	"Another Endless Night"	Mike Curtis, Mickey Buckins	3:40

== Personnel ==
- Billy Joe Royal – vocals
- Ron Oates – keyboards
- Ken Bell – electric guitar
- Mark Casstevens – acoustic guitar
- Gregg Galbraith – electric guitar
- Kenny Mims – acoustic guitar
- Sonny Garrish – steel guitar
- Richard "Spady" Brannan – bass guitar
- Joe Osborn – bass guitar
- Bob Wray – bass guitar
- Jerry Kroon – drums
- Mickey Buckins – percussion
- Denis Solee – saxophone
- Harry Stinson – backing vocals (1–5, 7–12)
- Wendy Suits – backing vocals (1–5, 7–12)
- Dennis Wilson – backing vocals (1–5, 7–12)
- Larrice Byrd – backing vocals (6)
- Michael Mishaw – backing vocals (6)
- Roderick Owens – backing vocals (6)

=== Production ===
- Nelson Larkin – producer
- Ron "Snake" Reynolds – engineer
- Hank Williams – mastering at MasterMix (Nashville, Tennessee)
- Bob Defrin – art direction
- Mark Tucker – photography

== Chart performance ==
Chart (1986)	Peak position
U.S. Billboard Top Country Albums	21
