= Steal Away (Jimmy Hughes song) =

1964 R&B single by Jimmy Hughes

Single by Jimmy Hughes

from the album Steal Away
- B-side: "Lolly Pops Lace & Lipstick"
- Released: May 1964
- Recorded: 1963
- Studio: FAME Studios
- Genre: Southern soul
- Length: 2:25
- Label: Fame
- Songwriter: Jimmy Hughes
- Producer: Rick Hall

Jimmy Hughes singles chronology
"I'm Qualified" (1963)	"Steal Away" (1964)	"I'm Qualified" (1964)

"Steal Away" is a 1964 R&B hit and Top 40 crossover song written and recorded by Jimmy Hughes. It was the first single recorded at FAME Studios in Muscle Shoals, Alabama.

== Original version ==
Jimmy Hughes of Leighton, Alabama, had since the age of eight been a church chorister: by 1962, when the 24 year old Hughes was working at the rubber plant in Muscle Shoals, he was regularly performing with a gospel group at Colbert County venues and also on Tuscumbia radio station WZZA. The success of local singer Arthur Alexander, whose single "You Better Move On" was a Top 30 hit in the spring of 1962, encouraged Hughes to audition for Alexander's producer Rick Hall at the latter's fledgling Wilson Dam Highway recording studio.

After Hall had Hughes record two singles which failed to pass the threshold of local success, he suggested that the singer himself write a song Hall might produce for him: Hughes resultantly reworked the hymn "Steal Away" into a secular cheating song, reportedly coming up with a line or two at a time while on the factory night shift over a two week period. Hall - still operating on Wilson Dam Highway - had Hughes record a demo of "Steal Away" in 1962, but reportedly had fears about the reception likely to be afforded a black man's exhortation to infidelity: it was not until some two years after Hughes cut the "Steal Away" demo that Hall had Hughes make a full recording of the song, "Steal Away" being the first track recorded at the FAME Studios which Hall established at 603 East Avalon Avenue in Muscle Shoals in 1963, the session personnel being that which had backed Arthur Alexander on "You Better Move On": guitarist Terry Thompson, keyboardist David Briggs, bassist Norbert Putnam and drummer Jerry Carrigan. Hall also had Hughes - who recorded his vocal in one take - backed by a chorale, an effect borrowed from the 1959 Bonnie Guitar single "Candy Apple Red". Also on the session were backing vocalists Darlene Eddleman and Jerry Eddleman.

The release of "Steal Away" on Fame in May 1964 was occasioned by a visit to FAME Studios by "Mr Atlanta Music" Bill Lowery, on whose say-so Hall made an initial one thousand copy pressing of "Steal Away", Hall and FAME Studios sideman Dan Penn - then 23 years old - distributing the discs to radio stations throughout the South in a two-week road trip in a station wagon Hall borrowed off the used car lot where he worked part-time for his father-in-law(Hall would recall besides the record each radio station was gifted with a bottle of vodka: (Rick Hall quote:)"Miraculously, that's all it took. Each and every one of [the radio stations visited] played the new Jimmy Hughes record.") With Lowery's assistance, Hall's "grass roots" efforts on behalf of "Steal Away" led to a distribution deal for the disc with Vee Jay Records: reaching the Top 40 in July 1964, "Steal Away" would rise as high as No. 17 on the Hot 100 in Billboard magazine: the Cash Box Top 100 chart listed "Steal Away" as high as No. 12 while the Cash Box Top 50 R&B 20 chart of 22 August 1964 ranked "Slip Away" at No. 2 behind "Under the Boardwalk" by the Drifters (Billboard magazine did not publish a ranking of top R&B singles from 30 November 1963 through 23 January 1965). In Canada, the song reached No. 17.

"Steal Away" served as the title cut of Hughes debut album, released on Vee Jay Records in 1964.

== Remakes ==
"Steal Away"

Single by Johnnie Taylor

from the album Johnnie Taylor's Greatest Hits
- B-side: "Friday Night"
- Released: May 1970
- Recorded: 1970
- Studio: Stax Studios (Memphis)
- Genre: Memphis soul
- Length: 3:15
- Label: Stax
- Songwriter: Jimmy Hughes
- Producer: Don Davis

Johnnie Taylor singles chronology
"Love Bones" (1969)	"Steal Away" (1970)	"I am Somebody Part II" (1970)

Johnnie Taylor successfully remade "Steal Away" in 1970: a No. 3 R&B hit, Taylor's remake also crossed-over to the Top 40 with especial success in the Bay Area and in Memphis and Nashville reaching No. 37 on the Billboard Hot 100. The 2007 album release Johnnie Taylor - Live At The Summit Club - a 23 September 1972 taping at a Los Angeles nightclub - included a live rendition of "Steal Away". In Canada, this version reached No. 36.

A 1976 remake of "Steal Away" by Ted Taylor was a minor R&B hit (No. 64): the track's parent album: Ted Taylor 1976, was recorded at the Sound City studio in Shreveport, Louisiana with Wardell Quezergue producing.

Rick Hall, producer of the original Jimmy Hughes version of "Steal Away", subsequently helmed four remakes of the song, three of them at his FAME Studios. The first was Etta James' version, included on her 1968 album Tell Mama and released as the B-side of her 1969 single "Almost Persuaded". The second was Clarence Carter's version, included on his 1969 album The Dynamic Clarence Carter. Carter's 1968 million-selling single "Slip Away", also produced by Hall at FAME Studios, is considered a "scion" of "Steal Away". In 1977 Hall would produce a recording of "Steal Away" by Bobbie Gentry whose 1969 album Fancy had been recorded by Hall at FAME Studios, although Gentry's version of "Slip Away" would be the only Rick Hall production of the song not recorded at FAME Studios, instead being cut a few blocks east on East Avalon Avenue at the Music Mill. Issued as a single - Gentry's last - in February 1978, "Steal Away" would make its album debut in 1990 on the compilation album Bobbie Gentry - Greatest Hits. Hall's fourth and final remake of "Steal Away" was that by Terri Gibbs, featured on her 1983 album release Over Easy.

In 1965 a remake of "Steal Away" served as the B-side of the Top Twenty hit "I Knew You When" by Billy Joe Royal whose manager Bill Lowery had been largely responsible for the success of the Jimmy Hughes original: Royal's version was included on his Down in the Boondocks album release.

The Drifters, whose "Under the Boardwalk" held off Jimmy Hughes' "Steal Away" from the top of the R&B chart in 1964, in 1969 had their own single release of "Steal Away", which failed to chart.

Ann Peebles remade "Steal Away" for her debut album: the 1969 Hi Records release This is Ann Peebles. According to Peebles while on vacation from her East St Louis hometown she visited a South Memphis club and asked to do a number with trumpeter Gene "Bowlegs" Miller's band: on the strength of Peebles' performance of "Steal Away" Miller arranged for her to sign with HI Records the following day.

"Steal Away" has also been recorded by Z Z Hill (album A Whole Lot of Soul/ 1967), Little Milton (album Grits Ain't Groceries/ 1969), the Persuasions (album We Still Ain't Got No Band/ 1973), Drink Small (album Round Two/ 1991), Valerie Wellington (album Life in the Big City/ 1992), Nathan Cavaleri (album Nathan/ 1994), Vance Kelly (album Joyriding in the Subway/ 1995), Big Time Sarah (album Blues in the Year One/ 1996), Skeeter Brandon (album License to Thrill/ 1996), Guitar Slim Jr. (album Nothing Nice/ 1996), Johnny Laws (album Blues Burnin' in My Soul/ 1999), Trudy Lynn (album Trudy's Blues/ 2002), Renée Geyer (album Dedicated/ 2007), JD McPherson (The Warm Covers EP/ 2014), and Walter "Wolfman" Washington (album My Future is My Past/ 2017). A version of "Steal Away" by Frank Zappa was featured on his 1998 Mystery Disc compilation set.
