= Get Closer (Linda Ronstadt album) =

Album by Linda Ronstadt

Studio album by Linda Ronstadt
- Released: September 27, 1982
- Recorded: August 1981–August 1982
- Studio: George Massenburg Studio, Los Angeles; Record One, Los Angeles
- Genre: Rock; country rock
- Length: 36:31
- Label: Asylum
- Producer: Peter Asher

Linda Ronstadt chronology
Greatest Hits, Volume 2 (1980)	Get Closer (1982)	What's New (1983)

Singles from Get Closer
- 1. "Get Closer" Released: September 1982; 2. "I Knew You When" Released: November 1982; 3. "Easy for You to Say" Released: April 1983

Get Closer is the eleventh studio album by singer Linda Ronstadt, released in 1982.

== History ==
With her previous album, Mad Love, in 1980, Ronstadt's career took a turn away from the country-rock style she'd succeeded with for more than a decade. In 1980–81, she sang light opera on Broadway in The Pirates of Penzance, and during production of the play in New York she expressed a desire to record an album of standards. In 1981, she recorded a session with producer Jerry Wexler and a small jazz combo for a planned album titled Keeping Out of Mischief, but Ronstadt was dissatisfied with the results and cancelled its release. Although she would later revisit the concept (and most of the songs she'd attempted with Wexler) for a trilogy of albums with Nelson Riddle, Get Closer was recorded to satisfy her label obligations, with Ronstadt working again with producer Peter Asher and returning to the genres that had resulted in her commercial and critical success throughout the 1970s.

The album contained two tracks originally recorded for but left off of previous albums: A remake of George Jones's "Sometimes You Just Can't Win," recorded for Simple Dreams in June 1977 with JD Souther on harmony vocals; and a cover of Dolly Parton's 1971 song "My Blue Tears," performed with Parton and Emmylou Harris as part of a planned trio album that was never released due to scheduling and record company conflicts. The trio version was originally recorded in January 1978; Parton, Ronstadt and Harris would eventually record and release the first of two albums together in 1987 (Trio, followed by Trio II in 1999).

Also on Get Closer was a duet with James Taylor on a remake of Ike and Tina Turner's "I Think It's Gonna Work Out Fine"; and covers of two mid-1960s hits: The Knickerbockers' "Lies" and The Exciters' "Tell Him." A version of the 1965 Everly Brothers song "The Price of Love" was recorded for the album as well, but remains unreleased.

== Reception ==
Professional ratings
Review scores
Source	Rating
AllMusic	2/5 stars
Robert Christgau	C+
Rolling Stone	4/5 stars

Asylum Records released Get Closer in late September 1982. Reviewers wrote about a newfound confidence in Ronstadt's vocals. Ken Tucker of Rolling Stone magazine wrote in his November 11 review, "Linda Ronstadt's voice has never sounded better than it does on Get Closer...its spirit is unassailable." Noting her turn in Pirates, Tucker wrote that Ronstadt's vocal development on Broadway "hasn't made her self-conscious. Just the opposite, in fact: Linda Ronstadt is no longer a prisoner of technique." Tucker did decry much of the album's second side, saying that some of the oldies in the soul genre were performed too meticulously.

Stephen Holden of The New York Times also hailed Ronstadt's vocal performance on the album, writing, "Miss Ronstadt's singing is so strong and unaffected." He called the title track "the album's most adventurous performance" and noted that Ronstadt's "shouting, growling exuberance" was "reminiscent of Aretha Franklin's 'Respect.'"

In The Boston Phoenix, Milo Miles found Ronstadt's album to be "an unusually casual, dry-eyed curtain call — it includes nods to her songwriting kith and kin as well as leftovers from her heyday and a few glassy late-period laments. Get Closer does not sum up or revise Ronstadt’s career so much as it lifelessly recycles a once-potent formula now helplessly (hopelessly?) out of synch with even rock’s mainstream."

Commercially, the album was a disappointment, peaking at number 31 on the Billboard album chart in late 1982, her first album to fail to make the top 5 since 1973. It was, however, certified Gold by the Recording Industry Association of America for sales of over 500,000 copies, and surpassed American sales of 900,000 copies by the time of its deletion from print

This album's driving title track, "Get Closer" was written by Washington D.C.–based singer-songwriter Jon Carroll, an original member of the Starland Vocal Band. The song, notable for its unusual 7/4 septuple meter, was later chosen to promote Close-Up toothpaste ("Want love? Get Close-Up").

Assisted by a popular MTV music video, "Get Closer" peaked at number 29 on the Billboard Hot 100 and hit the Top 20 in Cash Box magazine. It garnered considerable airplay on AOR (Album-Oriented Rock) stations while its follow-up single, "I Knew You When", was also aided by a popular music video and peaked at number 37 Pop, number 25 Adult Contemporary, and number 84 Country.

Ronstadt's seductive interpretation of Jimmy Webb's "Easy For You To Say" was a surprise Top Ten hit on Billboard's Adult Contemporary chart in the spring of 1983. "Sometimes You Just Can't Win," the B-side to the "Get Closer" single, peaked at number 27 on Billboard's Hot Country Songs chart.

Ronstadt was nominated in early 1983 for a Grammy Award for Best Pop Vocal Performance Female and Best Rock Vocal Performance Female for the album and the song "Get Closer", losing to Melissa Manchester and Pat Benatar respectively. The album did, however, win the Grammy for Best Album Package, an art director's award. The trophy went to well-known designers Ron Larson and Kosh.

== Track listing ==
No.	Title	Writer(s)	Length
1.	"Get Closer"	Jon Carroll	2:29
2.	"The Moon Is a Harsh Mistress"	Jimmy Webb	3:03
3.	"I Knew You When"	Joe South	2:53
4.	"Easy for You to Say"	Jimmy Webb	4:03
5.	"People Gonna Talk"	William Wheeler, Lee Dorsey, Morris Levy, Clarence L. Lewis	2:38
6.	"Talk to Me of Mendocino"	Kate McGarrigle	2:57
7.	"I Think It's Gonna Work Out Fine" (with James Taylor)	Rose Marie McCoy, Sylvia McKinney	4:01
8.	"Mr. Radio"	Roderick Taylor	4:07
9.	"Lies"	Buddy Randell, Beau Charles	2:35
10.	"Tell Him"	Bert Berns	2:35
11.	"Sometimes You Just Can't Win" (with JD Souther)	Smokey Stover	2:30
12.	"My Blue Tears" (with Dolly Parton and Emmylou Harris)	Dolly Parton	2:40
Total length:			36:31

== Personnel ==
=== Musicians ===
- Linda Ronstadt – lead vocals, backing vocals (1, 3, 7, 10, 12)
- Bill Payne – Wurlitzer electric piano (1), acoustic piano (2, 3, 5), string arrangements and conductor (2), organ (3), Fender Rhodes (4, 8), synthesizers (8), keyboards (9, 10)
- Lindsey Buckingham – accordion (6)
- Don Grolnick – Prophet-5 (7), organ (11)
- Andrew Gold – electric guitar (1, 10), acoustic guitar (6, 8), percussion (7, 8, 10), harmony vocals (8), acoustic piano (11)
- Danny Kortchmar – electric guitar (1–4, 9, 11)
- Waddy Wachtel – electric guitar (1, 4, 7, 10), acoustic guitar (11)
- Dan Dugmore – pedal steel guitar (2, 8, 11), electric guitar (4, 7, 9)
- David Grisman – mandolin (6)
- Emmylou Harris – acoustic guitar (12), lead and backing vocals (12)
- Bob Glaub – bass guitar (1–5, 7–10)
- Kenny Edwards – acoustic bass guitar (6), bass guitar (11)
- Russ Kunkel – drums (1–5, 8, 9)
- Rick Shlosser – drums (7, 10)
- Rick Marotta – drums (11)
- Peter Asher – percussion (8, 10)
- Jerry Peterson – saxophone (5)
- Jim Horn – baritone saxophone (7)
- Dennis Karmazyn – cello (6)
- Patti Austin – backing vocals (1, 3)
- Rosemary Butler – backing vocals (1, 3, 9, 10)
- James Taylor – lead and backing vocals (7)
- Edie Lehmann – backing vocals (9)
- Debbie Pearl – backing vocals (10)
- JD Souther – lead and harmony vocals (11)
- Dolly Parton – lead and backing vocals (12)

=== Production ===
- Peter Asher – producer (Tracks 1–11)
- Brian Ahern – producer (Track 12)
- George Massenburg – engineer (Tracks 1–11)
- Val Garay – engineer (Tracks 1–11)
- Stuart Taylor – engineer (Track 12)
- Niko Bolas, Barbara Rooney and Bruce Wildstein – assistant engineers (Tracks 1–11)
- Doug Sax – mastering engineer
- Edd Kolakowski – piano and guitar technician
- Aaron Rapoport – photography
- John Kosh with Ron Larson – art direction and design
- Gloria Boyce – album coordination

Studios

- Tracks 1-11 recorded at George Massenburg Studios (Los Angeles, CA).
- Track 12 recorded at Record One (Sherman Oaks, CA).
- Mastered at The Mastering Lab (Hollywood, CA).

== Charts ==
Chart (1982/83)	Peak position
Australia (Kent Music Report)	31
Canadian RPM Top Albums	48
United States (Billboard 200)	31

== Certifications ==
Region	Certification	Certified units/sales
United States (RIAA)	Gold	500,000^{^}
^{^} Shipments figures based on certification alone.

== Release history ==
Release history and formats for Get Closer
Region	Date	Format	Label	Ref.
North America	September 27, 1982	LP; cassette	Asylum Records	
