= I Knew You When (Billy Joe Royal song) =

1965 single by Billy Joe Royal

Single by Billy Joe Royal

from the album Down in the Boondocks
- B-side: "Steal Away"
- Released: 1965
- Genre: Rock
- Length: 2:32
- Label: Columbia 43390
- Songwriter(s): Joe South

Billy Joe Royal singles chronology
"Down in the Boondocks" (1965)	"I Knew You When" (1965)	"I've Got to Be Somebody" (1965)

"I Knew You When"

Single by Linda Ronstadt

from the album Get Closer
- B-side: "Talk to Me of Mendocino"
- Released: November 23, 1982
- Genre: Rock
- Length: 2:53
- Label: Asylum
- Songwriter(s): Joe South
- Producer(s): Peter Asher

Linda Ronstadt singles chronology
"Get Closer" (1982)	"I Knew You When" (1982)	"Easy for You to Say" (1983)

"I Knew You When" is a song written and composed by Joe South. It became a popular hit in 1965 when recorded by American pop and country singer Billy Joe Royal. There have also been several other hit cover versions of this song, including by Donny Osmond and Linda Ronstadt.

== Billy Joe Royal version ==
"I Knew You When" was first recorded by Billy Joe Royal for his 1965 studio album, Down in the Boondocks. The song reached No. 14 on the Billboard Hot 100 the week of November 6, 1965. The song went to No. 1 on the Canadian music chart in November 1965.

== Donny Osmond version ==
Donny Osmond released a version in 1971 as the B-side of "Hey Girl" that went to No. 9 on the Hot 100 as a double-sided hit.

== Linda Ronstadt version ==
Linda Ronstadt recorded a cover version for her Gold-plus 1982 album, Get Closer. Her single was produced by Peter Asher and released on Asylum Records. Aided by a popular music video, it reached #30 on the Cash Box Top 100 chart and #37 on the Billboard Hot 100 as the album's second single.

Additionally, it reached No. 84 on the country chart, and No. 90 in the United Kingdom. The song was also a Top 40 Hit in Australia, giving Ronstadt an underappreciated hit, reaching #36 on the Kent Music Report chart in early 1983. It did best on the adult contemporary charts, reaching #29 (U.S.) and #17 (Canada).

== Other versions ==
- Wade Flemons released a version of the song as a single in 1964 on Vee-Jay Records. Flemons would become a founding member of Earth, Wind & Fire in 1971.
- Joe South would later record his version of the song for his 1969 album, Games People Play.
