= I Miss You Already (And You're Not Even Gone) =

Single by Faron Young
- B-side: "I'm Gonna Live Some Before I Die"
- Released: February 23, 1957
- Genre: Country
- Label: Capitol
- Songwriter(s): Faron Young, Marvin Rainwater

Faron Young singles chronology
"Turn Her Down" (1956)	"I Miss You Already (And You're Not Even Gone)" (1957)	"The Shrine of St. Cecilia" (1957)

"I Miss You Already (And You're Not Even Gone)" is a song recorded by American country music artist Faron Young. It was released in February 1957 as a single only. The song reached No. 5 on the Billboard Hot Country Singles & Tracks chart.

== Chart performance ==
Chart (1956–1957)	Peak position
US Hot Country Songs (Billboard)	5

=== Billy Joe Royal version ===
"I Miss You Already"

Single by Billy Joe Royal

from the album Looking Ahead
- B-side: "Another Endless Night"
- Released: August 23, 1986
- Genre: Country
- Length: 3:13
- Label: Atlantic
- Songwriter(s): Faron Young, Marvin Rainwater
- Producer(s): Nelson Larkin

Billy Joe Royal singles chronology
"Boardwalk Angel" (1986)	"I Miss You Already" (1986)	"Old Bridges Burn Slow" (1987)

The song was recorded by American country music artist Billy Joe Royal, under the title "I Miss You Already". It was released in August 1986 as the second single from the album Looking Ahead. The song reached No. 14 on the Billboard Hot Country Singles & Tracks chart.

=== Chart performance ===
Chart (1986)	Peak position
US Hot Country Songs (Billboard)	14

== Other versions ==
- Margie Rayburn released a version of the song as a single in 1960 under the title "I Miss You Already", but it did not chart.
