= Old Bridges Burn Slow =

Single by Billy Joe Royal

from the album Looking Ahead
- B-side: "We've Both Got a Lot to Learn"
- Released: February 7, 1987
- Genre: Country
- Length: 3:27
- Label: Atlantic
- Songwriter(s): Joe South, Jerry Meaders, Sanford Brown
- Producer(s): Nelson Larkin

Billy Joe Royal singles chronology
"I Miss You Already" (1986)	"Old Bridges Burn Slow" (1987)	"Members Only" (1987)

"Old Bridges Burn Slow" is a song written by Joe South, Jerry Meadors, and Sanford Brown, and recorded by American country music artist Billy Joe Royal. It was released in February 1987 as the fourth single from the album Looking Ahead. The song reached number 11 on the Billboard Hot Country Singles & Tracks chart.

== Chart performance ==
Chart (1987)	Peak position
US Hot Country Songs (Billboard)	11
