= The Greatest Love of All (disambiguation) =

"The Greatest Love of All" is a song originally recorded by George Benson in 1977, later covered by Whitney Houston in 1986.

The Greatest Love of All may also refer to:

- The Greatest Love of All (1924 film), an American drama film directed by George Beban
- The Greatest Love of All (2006 film), English title of the Brazilian romantic drama film O Maior Amor do Mundo
- The Greatest Love of All (TV series), a Singaporean Chinese drama series
