= Out of Sight and on My Mind =

Single by Billy Joe Royal

from the album The Royal Treatment
- B-side: "She Don't Cry Like She Used To"
- Released: March 12, 1988
- Genre: Country
- Length: 3:49
- Label: Atlantic
- Songwriter(s): Bruce Burch, Rick Peoples
- Producer(s): Nelson Larkin

Billy Joe Royal singles chronology
| "I'll Pin a Note on Your Pillow" (1987) | "Out of Sight and on My Mind" (1988) | "It Keeps Right On Hurtin'" (1988) |

"Out of Sight and on My Mind" is a song written by Bruce Burch and Rick Peoples, and recorded by American country music artist Billy Joe Royal. It was released in March 1988 as the second single from the album The Royal Treatment. The song reached number 10 on the Billboard Hot Country Singles & Tracks chart.

== Charts ==
=== Weekly charts ===
| Chart (1988) | Peak position |
|---|---|
| US Hot Country Songs (Billboard) | 10 |
| Canadian RPM Country Tracks | 7 |

=== Year-end charts ===
| Chart (1988) | Position |
|---|---|
| US Hot Country Songs (Billboard) | 92 |
