= Down in the Boondocks (album) =

Studio album by Billy Joe Royal
- Released: 1965
- Genre: Rock, pop, country
- Label: Columbia
- Producer: Joe South

Billy Joe Royal chronology
Billy Joe Royal (1965)	Down in the Boondocks (1965)	Billy Joe Royal Featuring Hush (1967)

Singles from Down in the Boondocks
- 1. "Down in the Boondocks" Released: 1965; 2. "I Knew You When" Released: 1965; 3. "I've Got to Be Somebody" Released: 1965

Professional ratings
Review scores
Source	Rating
AllMusic	4/5 stars

Down in the Boondocks is the second studio album by Billy Joe Royal released in 1965, the same year as his self-titled debut album.

There were three singles released from the album, all reaching the top 40: the title track (#9), "I Knew You When" (#14), and "I've Got to Be Somebody" (#38). The album also landed on the Pop Albums chart, peaking at No. 96.

== Track listing ==
All tracks composed by Joe South, except where indicated

1. "Pollyanna"
2. "Leaning on You"
3. "Heartaches and Teardrops" (Marty Cooper, Ray Whitley)
4. "Funny How Time Slips Away" (Willie Nelson)
5. "My Fondest Memories"
6. "Down in the Boondocks"
7. "I Knew You When"
8. "Those Railroad Tracks in Between" (Freddy Weller)
9. "Steal Away" (Jimmy Hughes)
10. "Oh, What a Night" (Marvin Junior, Johnny Funches)
11. "King of Fools" (Tommy Roe)
12. "I've Got to Be Somebody"
