= Heart's Desire (book) =

Book by Edward Hoagland

Heart's Desire is a book by Edward Hoagland, published by Summit Books circa 1988 with the ISBN 978-0-67164-985-2.

In the book's 35 essays, Hoagland offers his observations on a range of topics, including life, love, marriage, children, suffering, the city, and isolation.

== Contents ==
- "The Ridge-Slope Fox and the Knife Thrower"
- "The Courage of Turtles"
- "Home is Two Places"
- "Mountain Notch"
- "Of Cows and Cambodia"
- "Howling Back at the Wolves"
- "Lament the Red Wolf"
- "Thoughts on Returning to the City After Five Months on a Mountain Where the Wolves Howled"
- "City Walking"
- "City Rat"
- "The Threshold and the Jolt of Pain"
- "In the Toils of the Law"
- "Virginie and the Slaves"
- "Mushpan Man"
- "Bears, Bears, Bears"
- "Hailing the Elusory Mountain Lion"
- "The Moose on the Wall"
- "A Run of Bad Luck"
- "Heart's Desire"
- "The Lapping, Itchy Edge of Love"
- "The Problem of the Golden Rule"
- "Bragging for Humanity"
- "Dogs and the Tug of Life"
- "Other Lives"
- "The Midnight Train to Portland"
- "Fred King and the Allagash"
- "Walking the Dead Diamond River"
- "The Tugman's Passage"
- "A Low-Water Man"
- "Heaven and Nature"
- "Tiger Bright"
- "Dying Argots"
- "Two Clowns"
- "Should Auld Acquaintance"
- "Gods, Masks, and Horses"
