= The Royal Treatment (album) =

Studio album by Billy Joe Royal
- Released: 1987
- Studios: The Music Mill, MasterMix and Sixteenth Avenue Sound (Nashville, Tennessee)
- Genre: Country
- Length: 40:04
- Label: Atlantic
- Producer: Nelson Larkin

Billy Joe Royal chronology
Looking Ahead (1987)	The Royal Treatment (1987)	Tell It Like It Is (1989)

Singles from The Royal Treatment
- 1. "I'll Pin a Note on Your Pillow" Released: October 17, 1987; 2. "Out of Sight and on My Mind" Released: March 12, 1988

Professional ratings
Review scores
Source	Rating
Allmusic	link

The Royal Treatment is the sixth studio album by American country artist Billy Joe Royal, which was released in 1987.

Three singles from this album charted on the Country Singles chart. The first was "I'll Pin a Note on Your Pillow", which peaked at #5 in 1987. This was followed by "It Keeps Right On a-Hurtin'" (#17) and "Out of Sight and on My Mind" (#10), both that charted in 1988.

The album also landed on the Country Albums chart, reaching #5 in 1987.

== Track listing ==
No.	Title	Writer(s)	Length
1.	"I'll Pin a Note on Your Pillow"	Carol W. Berzas Jr., Don Goodman, Nelson Larkin	4:08
2.	"Give 'Em My Number"	Dave Loggins	2:43
3.	"He'll Have to Go"	Audrey Allison, Joe Allison	3:45
4.	"Look What You've Done to My Heart""	Ron Reynolds	4:00
5.	"Let It Rain"	Mieke Appel, Richard Wayne Cox	3:52
6.	"Members Only" (duet with Donna Fargo)	Larry Addison	3:56
7.	"It's Who's in Your Heart"	Reynolds	3:07
8.	"Out of Sight and on My Mind"	Bruce Burch, Rick Peoples	3:48
9.	"It Keeps Right On Hurtin'"	Johnny Tillotson	2:57
10.	"She Don't Cry Like She Used To"	Frank Saulino, Jim Valentini	4:05
11.	"A Place for the Heartache"	Mike Curtis	3:43

== Personnel ==
- Billy Joe Royal – vocals
- Ron Oates – acoustic piano, synthesizers, synthesizer programming
- David Huntsinger – synthesizers
- John Slick – synthesizer programming
- Kenny Bell – acoustic guitar
- Kenny Mims – acoustic guitar, electric guitars
- Brent Rowan – acoustic guitar, electric guitars
- Billy Sanford – acoustic guitar
- Sonny Garrish – steel guitar
- Gary Lunn – bass
- Bob Wray – bass
- Jerry Kroon – drums, percussion
- Ron "Snake" Reynolds – percussion
- Jim Horn – horns
- Harvey Thompson – horns
- Wayne Jackson – horns
- Charles Rose – horns
- Warren Haynes – backing vocals
- Michael Mishaw – backing vocals
- Kim Morrison – backing vocals
- Harry Stinson – backing vocals
- Dennis Wilson – backing vocals
- Curtis Young – backing vocals
- Donna Fargo – vocals (6)

=== Production ===
- Nelson Larkin – producer
- Ron "Snake" Reynolds – engineer
- Hank Williams – mastering at MasterMix
- Peter Nash – photography

== Charts ==
=== Weekly charts ===
Chart (1987–1988)	Peak position
US Top Country Albums (Billboard)	5

=== Year-end charts ===
Chart (1988)	Position
US Top Country Albums (Billboard)	7
Chart (1989)	Position
US Top Country Albums (Billboard)	68
