= Ron Larson (artist) =

American artist

Ron Larson is an art director, album cover designer and graphic artist. He has won two Grammys for his designs. He has worked closely with John Kosh and also done many various projects for Disney. He was also responsible for helping with the design of the original Star Wars Episode IV: A New Hope logo as well as designing the logo for The Empire Strikes Back. He rendered the logo for Spinal Tap LP Break Like the Wind and the movie poster for Prince's Under The Cherry Moon. Besides working in both the movie industry and recording industry he was also involved in the art used on video game covers. Larson also helped design the logo used by United Artists Films. He currently teaches graphic design classes for undergraduate students at California State University, Fullerton.

== Awards ==
Larson is a Grammy nominee, and has won two of the awards:

- Grammy Awards of 1985-John Kosh & Ron Larson (art directors) for Lush Life performed by Linda Ronstadt
- Grammy Awards of 1982-John Kosh & Ron Larson (art directors) for Get Closer performed by Linda Ronstadt
