= I'll Pin a Note on Your Pillow =

Single by Billy Joe Royal

from the album The Royal Treatment
- B-side: "A Place for the Heartache"
- Released: October 17, 1987
- Genre: Country
- Length: 4:10
- Label: Atlantic
- Songwriter(s): Carol W. Berzas Jr., Don Goodman, Nelson Larkin
- Producer(s): Nelson Larkin

Billy Joe Royal singles chronology
"Members Only" (1987)	"I'll Pin a Note on Your Pillow" (1987)	"Out of Sight and on My Mind" (1988)

"I'll Pin a Note on Your Pillow" is a song written by Carol W. Berzas Jr., Don Goodman and Nelson Larkin, and recorded by American country music artist Billy Joe Royal. It was released in October 1987 as the first single from the album The Royal Treatment. The song reached number 5 on the Billboard Hot Country Singles & Tracks chart.

== Chart performance ==
Chart (1987–1988)	Peak position
US Hot Country Songs (Billboard)	5
Canadian RPM Country Tracks	17
