= Tell It Like It Is (song) =

1966 single by Aaron Neville

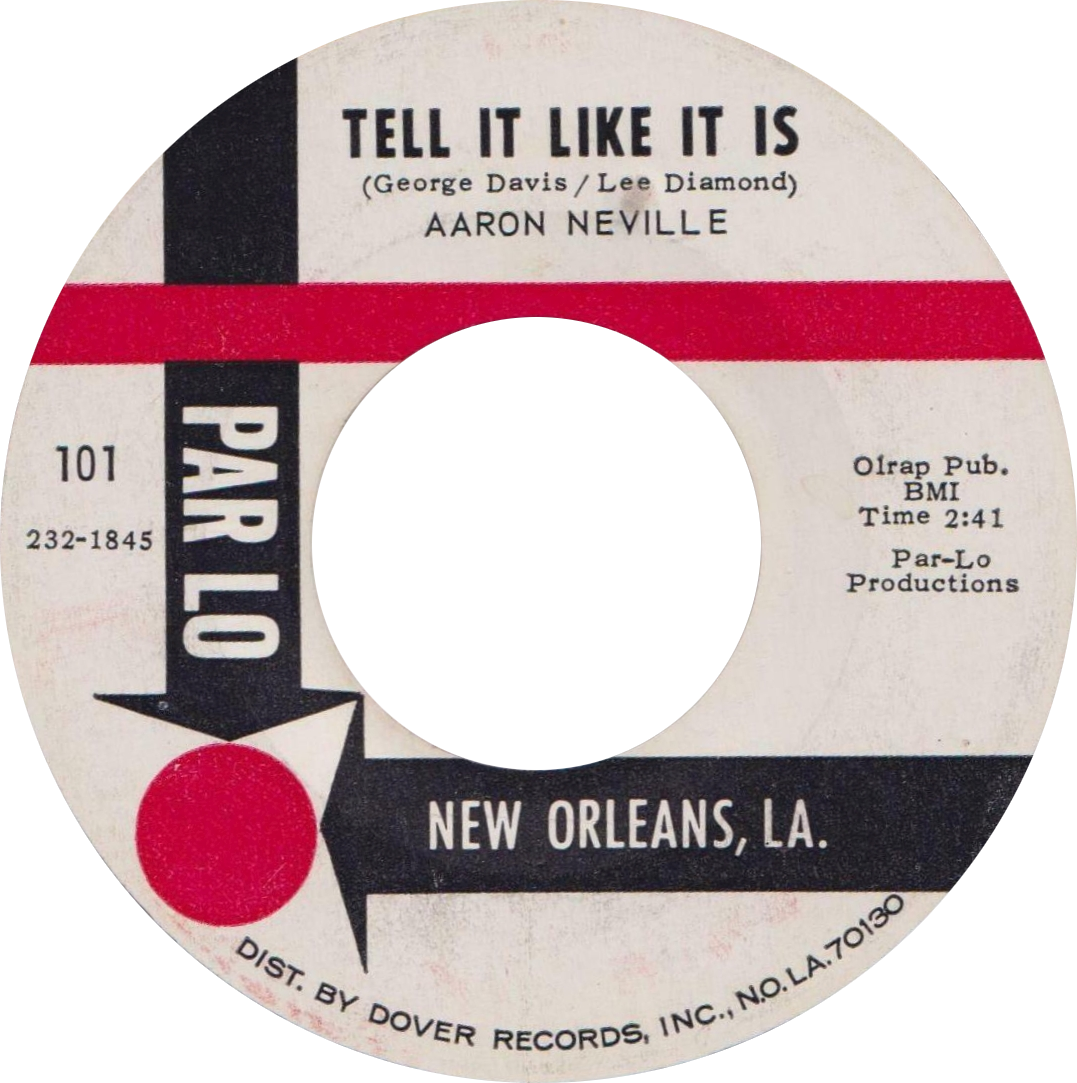
- One of side-A labels of the US single

Single by Aaron Neville

from the album Tell It Like It Is
- B-side: "Why Worry"
- Released: November 9, 1966
- Recorded: 1966
- Genre: R&B, pop
- Length: 2:40
- Label: Par-Lo
- Songwriters: George Davis; Lee Diamond

Aaron Neville singles chronology
"Over You" (1960)	"Tell It Like It Is" (1966)	"She Took You for a Ride" (1968)

"Tell It Like It Is" is a song written by George Davis and Lee Diamond and originally recorded and released in 1966 by Aaron Neville. In 2010, the song was ranked No. 391 on Rolling Stone magazine's list of The 500 Greatest Songs of All Time.

== Aaron Neville version ==
In 1966, Aaron Neville recorded and released the original version of "Tell It Like It Is" on his album also entitled Tell It Like It Is (Par-Lo Records). In November 1966, the track was issued as a single which peaked in early 1967 at No. 2 on the US Billboard Hot 100 (behind "I'm a Believer" by the Monkees) and No. 1 on the US Hot R&B/Hip-Hop Songs chart. The personnel on the original recording included George Davis arranging and playing baritone saxophone, Emory Humphrey-Thompson (Umar Shariff) on trumpet, Deacon John on guitar, Alvin "Red" Tyler on tenor saxophone, Willie Tee on piano and June Gardner on drums.

In 2015, the version of the song recorded in 1966 by Aaron Neville was inducted into the Grammy Hall of Fame.

Weekly charts for the Aaron Neville version
Chart (1966–1967)	Peak position
Canadian RPM Top Singles	8
Canadian RPM Adult Contemporary Tracks	2
US Billboard Hot 100	2
US Billboard Rhythm & Blues Singles	1

Year-end charts for the Aaron Neville version
Chart (1967)	Rank
Canada	35
US Billboard Hot 100	76

== Andy Williams version ==
His 1975 version touched the top 50 in the Canadian country charts, and was #16 in the AC charts.

== John Wesley Ryles version ==
"Tell It Like It Is"

Single by John Wesley Ryles

from the album John Wesley Ryles
- B-side: "Run Right Back"; Same song (Promotional releases only)
- Released: January 1976
- Genre: Country
- Label: ABC; Dot
- Songwriters: George Davis; Lee Diamond
- Producer: Johnny Morris

John Wesley Ryles singles chronology
"Reconsider Me" (1971)	"Tell It Like It Is" (1976)	"When a Man Loves a Woman" (1976)

In 1976, American Country singer John Wesley Ryles covered the song for his 1977 self-titled album, which also included a cover of When a Man Loves a Woman. Ryles's version became a minor hit, reaching Number 83 on the Billboard Hot Country Songs chart.

Chart (1976)	Peak position
US Hot Country Songs	83

== Heart version ==
"Tell It Like It Is"

Single by Heart

from the album Greatest Hits Live
- B-side: "Strange Euphoria"
- Released: November 1980
- Recorded: September 1980
- Genre: Blues rock
- Length: 3:49 (single version); 4:30 (album version)
- Label: Epic
- Songwriters: George Davis; Lee Diamond
- Producer: Heart

Heart singles chronology
"Bebe le Strange" (1980)	"Tell It Like It Is" (1980)	"Unchained Melody" (1981)

Heart covered "Tell It Like It Is" in 1980. It was a studio recording included on their Greatest Hits/Live album. It was the first of two singles released from the album, the other one a live recording but both of them cover hits. The song peaked at number 8 on the Billboard Hot 100 in late 1981 and became their highest-charting single in the United States to that point. It had higher success in Canada, reaching number 4.

Record World commented that Ann Wilson's "sensitive vocal" gives the song "a woman's point of view" and that Nancy Wilson "adds hot guitar passion."

Weekly charts for the Heart version
Chart (1980–1981)	Peak position
Canada RPM Top Singles	4
New Zealand (RIANZ)	4
US Billboard Hot 100	8
US Billboard Hot Adult Contemporary Tracks	43
US Cash Box Top 100	14

Year-end charts for the Heart version
Chart (1981)	Rank
Canada	45
US Billboard Hot 100	87

== Billy Joe Royal version ==
"Tell It Like It Is"

Single by Billy Joe Royal

from the album Tell It Like It Is
- B-side: "I Was Losing You"
- Released: January 1989
- Recorded: October 1988
- Genre: Country
- Length: 3:00
- Label: Atlantic
- Songwriters: George Davis; Lee Diamond
- Producer: Nelson Larkin

Billy Joe Royal singles chronology
"It Keeps Right On Hurtin'" (1988)	"Tell It Like It Is" (1989)	"Love Has No Right" (1989)

In 1988, American country soul singer Billy Joe Royal recorded a cover for his seventh studio album of the same name. Royal's version was released in January 1989 and reached Number 2 both on the Billboard Hot Country Songs and Canada Country charts respectively.

Weekly charts for the Billy Joe Royal version
Chart (1989)	Peak position
Canada Country Singles (RPM)	2
US Hot Country Songs (Billboard)	2

Year-end charts for the Billy Joe Royal version
Chart (1989)	Rank
Canada Country Tracks (RPM)	36
Europe (Eurochart Hot 100)	33
US Country Songs (Billboard)	51

== Don Johnson version ==
"Tell It Like It Is"

Single by Don Johnson

from the album Let It Roll
- B-side: "Angel City"
- Released: June 1989
- Genre: Pop
- Length: 4:30
- Label: Epic
- Songwriters: George Davis; Lee Diamond
- Producer: Keith Diamond

Don Johnson singles chronology
"Till I Loved You" (1988)	"Tell It Like It Is" (1989)	"Other People's Lives" (1989)

Also in 1989, American actor and singer Don Johnson covered the song for his second studio album Let It Roll. Johnson's version was successful in Europe, especially in West Germany, reaching number two there.

Chart (1989)	Peak position
Austria (Ö3 Austria Top 40)	13
France (SNEP)	6
Netherlands (Nationale Hitparade)	6
Switzerland (Swiss Hitparade)	6
UK Singles (OCC)	84
West Germany (Media Control)	2

=== Certifications ===
Region	Certification	Certified units/sales
France (SNEP)	Silver	200,000^{*}
^{*} Sales figures based on certification alone.

Country singer Archie Campbell, of Hee Haw fame, also recorded a version of this song in 1968.
