= Till I Can't Take It Anymore =

Single by Billy Joe Royal

from the album Tell It Like It Is
- B-side: "He Don't Know"
- Released: September 30, 1989
- Genre: Country
- Length: 3:58
- Label: Atlantic
- Songwriters: Clyde Otis, Dorian Burton
- Producer: Nelson Larkin

Billy Joe Royal singles chronology
"Love Has No Right" (1989)	"Till I Can't Take It Anymore" (1989)	"Searchin' for Some Kind of Clue" (1990)

"Till I Can't Take It Anymore" is a song written by Clyde Otis and Dorian Burton. It was first recorded by Ben E King in 1968. The song was featured in The Soul Clan's self-titled album The Soul Clan. Dottie West and Don Gibson's version charted at 46 on the Hot Country Songs in 1970. Since then, it has also charted as a single by Andra Willis, whose version went to number 85 on the same chart in 1973. Pal Rakes's version went to number 31 in 1977.

The highest-charting rendition of the song was by Billy Joe Royal, released in September 1989 from the album Tell It Like It Is. His version of the song peaked at number two on the country charts in early 1990, making for his second single to reach that position.

In 1969 Rocky Roberts realized a cover in Italian titled "Ma non ti lascio" in his album This is Rocky Roberts.

In 2004, The Beautiful South included a faster-tempo version of the song on their covers album Golddiggas, Headnodders and Pholk Songs. Other artists who have also previously recorded this song include Clarence Carter, Ray Charles, Jimmy James, Tom Jones, Charlie Rich, and Don Williams.

== Chart performance ==
Chart (1989–1990)	Peak position
Canada Country Singles (RPM)	3
US Hot Country Songs (Billboard)	2

=== Year-end charts ===
Chart (1990)	Position
Canada Country Tracks (RPM)	76
US Country Songs (Billboard)	43
