= Burned Like a Rocket =

Single by Billy Joe Royal

from the album Looking Ahead
- B-side: "Lonely Loving You"
- Released: October 26, 1985
- Genre: Country, doo-wop
- Length: 3:38
- Label: Atlantic
- Songwriter(s): Gary Burr
- Producer(s): Nelson Larkin

Billy Joe Royal singles chronology
"Under the Boardwalk" (1978)	"Burned Like a Rocket" (1985)	"Boardwalk Angel" (1986)

"Burned Like a Rocket" is a song written by Gary Burr, and recorded by American country music artist Billy Joe Royal. It was released in October 1985 as the first single from the album Looking Ahead. The song reached number 10 on the Billboard Hot Country Singles & Tracks chart. It was Royal's first Top 10 hit on that chart, and his first charting single overall since 1978.

Atlantic Records withdrew the single after the Space Shuttle Challenger disaster in January 1986.

== Chart performance ==
Chart (1985–1986)	Peak position
US Hot Country Songs (Billboard)	10
