= Jimmy Hughes (singer) =

American rhythm and blues singer (1938–2026)

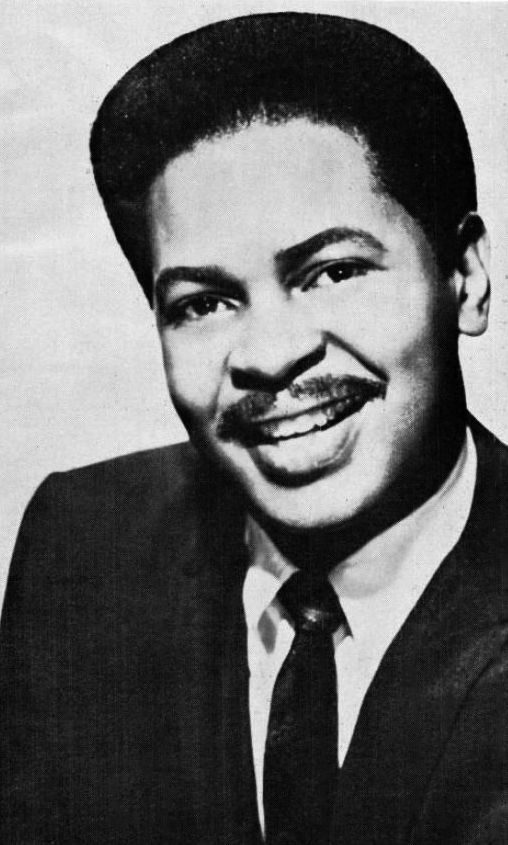
- Hughes in 1967

Background information
- Born: February 3, 1938; Leighton, Alabama, U.S.
- Died: May 20, 2026 (aged 88) Leighton, Alabama, U.S.
- Genres: Rhythm and blues
- Occupations: Musician; singer-songwriter
- Instruments: Guitar, vocals
- Years active: 1962–1970
- Labels: Guyden; Vee-Jay; Atlantic; Stax

Jimmy J. Hughes (February 3, 1938 – May 20, 2026) was an American rhythm and blues singer, whose biggest successes in the mid-1960s, notably his hit "Steal Away", were important in the early development of the Muscle Shoals music industry.

== Life and career ==
Hughes was born in Leighton, Alabama, on February 3, 1938. He was a cousin of Percy Sledge. He began singing in a gospel quartet, The Singing Clouds, while at high school. In 1962, he auditioned for record producer Rick Hall at his FAME Studios in Muscle Shoals. Hall was impressed, and recorded Hughes on a song, "I'm Qualified", that Hall had co-written with Quin Ivy. The record was leased to the Guyden label in Philadelphia but was not a hit. Hughes returned to his day job at a rubber factory, and began singing secular R&B songs in local clubs.

Early in 1964, he returned to Hall with a powerful ballad he had written, "Steal Away", partly based on the gospel song " Steal Away to Jesus", and recorded the song in one take, backed by the studio rhythm section of guitarist Terry Thompson, keyboardist David Briggs, bassist Norbert Putnam and drummer Jerry Carrigan. Hall and his friend Dan Penn then promoted the record around radio stations in the South, and it rose to number 17 on the Billboard Hot 100. The record has been cited as "a prototype not only for subsequent great soul singers such as Johnnie Taylor and Al Green, but also would help define the signature Muscle Shoals sound." On the basis of Hughes' record, Hall signed a national distribution deal with Vee-Jay Records for his FAME label. Hughes' follow-up record, "Try Me", reached number 65 on the Hot 100, and he recorded an album, Steal Away, released on the Vee-Jay label, which included the first songwriting collaborations between Dan Penn and Spooner Oldham. He also toured with Sam Cooke, Jackie Wilson, Bobby Womack and others.

Hughes' next few singles were unsuccessful, as Vee-Jay Records diverted their attention to The Beatles and The Four Seasons, and then folded. However, in 1966, after the success of Percy Sledge's "When a Man Loves a Woman", Hall negotiated a new deal for his label to be distributed by Atlantic Records. Hughes returned to the charts with "Neighbor, Neighbor" (number 65 pop, number 4 R&B), "I Worship the Ground You Walk On" (number 25 R&B), and "Why Not Tonight" (number 90 pop, number 5 R&B), before moving to the Atlantic label itself with "It Ain't What You Got" (number 43 R&B, 1968).

Early in 1968, Hughes moved to Stax Records, where his recordings were issued on the subsidiary Volt label. His first record for the label, "I Like Everything About You", reached number 21 on the R&B chart, but later records were less successful. At the time, Stax was undergoing a major reorganisation with new management and new artists. Although his records, including a 1969 album Something Special, were produced by label boss Al Bell, Hughes later stated that he felt like the "low man on the totem pole" at the label, and became frustrated by what he saw as a lack of promotion. He also tired of touring and being away from his family, and in 1970 gave up recording and performing. He retrained, and got a government job making parts for nuclear power plants in the Tennessee River Valley, in later years only singing as a member of the congregation of his local church in Leighton.

Several compilation albums of Hughes' recordings have been issued in recent years. He died in Leighton, Alabama, on May 20, 2026, at the age of 88.

== Discography ==
=== Singles (chart hits only) ===
Year	Title	Label & Cat. No.	U.S. Pop	U.S. R&B
1964	"Steal Away"	Fame 6401	17	n/a
1964	"Try Me"	Fame 6403	65	n/a
1966	"Neighbor, Neighbor"	Fame 1003	65	4
1966	"I Worship The Ground You Walk On"	Fame 1006	–	25
1967	"Why Not Tonight"	Fame 1011	90	5
1968	"It Ain't What You Got"	Atlantic 2454	–	43
1968	"I Like Everything About You"	Volt 4002	–	21

=== Albums ===
- Steal Away (Vee-Jay, 1965)
- Why Not Tonight? (Atco, 1967)
- Something Special (Volt, 1969)
