= Pal Rakes =

American country music singer

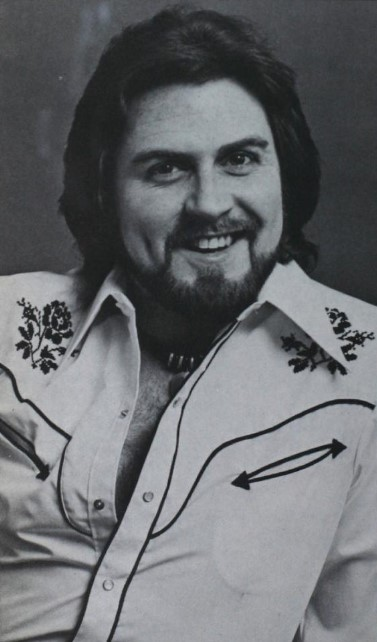
- Rakes in 1977

Background information
- Born: Palmer Crawford Rakes III
- Origin: Tampa, Florida, U.S.
- Genres: Country
- Occupation: Singer-songwriter
- Years active: 1977–1989
- Labels: Warner Bros., Atlantic

Palmer Crawford "Pal" Rakes III (born in Tampa, Florida) is an American country music singer. He recorded for Warner Bros. Records between 1977 and 1979, and for Atlantic Records between 1988 and 1989. During his tenure on Warner, he charted in the Top 40 of Hot Country Songs with "That's When the Lyin' Stops (And the Lovin' Starts)" and "Till I Can't Take It Anymore". Rakes also released one album for Atlantic, Midnight Rain. One of Rakes's songs appeared on Neal McCoy's debut album At This Moment.

== Discography ==
=== Albums ===
Year	Album information
1988	Midnight Rain: Label: Atlantic Records No. 90964; Released: 1988

=== Singles ===
Year	Single	Chart Positions		Album
Year	Single	US Country	CAN Country	Album
1977	"That's When the Lyin' Stops (And the Lovin' Starts)"	24	—	non-album songs
1977	"Till I Can't Take It Anymore"	31	—	non-album songs
1978	"If I Ever Come Back"	46	50	non-album songs
1978	"Till Then"	81	—	non-album songs
1979	"You and Me and the Green Grass"	92	—	non-album songs
1988	"I'm Only Lonely for You"	71	—	Midnight Rain
1989	"All You're Takin' Is My Love"	73	—	Midnight Rain
1989	"We Did It Once (We Can Do It Again)"	66	—	Midnight Rain
