= Sunbird Records =

US record label

Sunbird Records was an independent record label in the United States during the late 1970s and 1980s. Freddie Hart had a few hits with Sunbird after he left Capitol Records in 1979. Earl Thomas Conley also recorded some hits with Sunbird while working with Randy Scruggs. Delbert McClinton recorded his hit "Not Exactly Free" with the label.

== Background ==
The label was founded by Nelson Larkin.

Elroy Kahanek was one of the label's employees. Bobby G. Rice also recorded with the label. Sheb Wooley with Hi C. Lea recorded the single "Jackhammer Man" with the label in 1981. Price Mitchell and Rene Sloane did a recording on a 45 of "Mr. And Mrs. Untrue" and on the B side "Savin' It All For You" on Sunbird (he had recorded the 1971 Candi Staton song with Jerri Kelly in 1975). The same 45 was also released on Sunset Records.

Earl Thomas Conley recorded his Blue Pearl album with Sunbird. His song "Fire and Smoke" from the similarly titled album reached #1 on the country music chart in 1981 and he was soon signed to RCA Records.

Freddie Hart had a Top 20 hit with "Sure Thing" on a Sunbird album in 1980 and then three Top 40 hits in 1981.

== Later years ==
Founder Nelson Larkin died at age 70 on Monday, November 18, 2013.
