= Billy Joe Royal =

American singer (1942–2015)

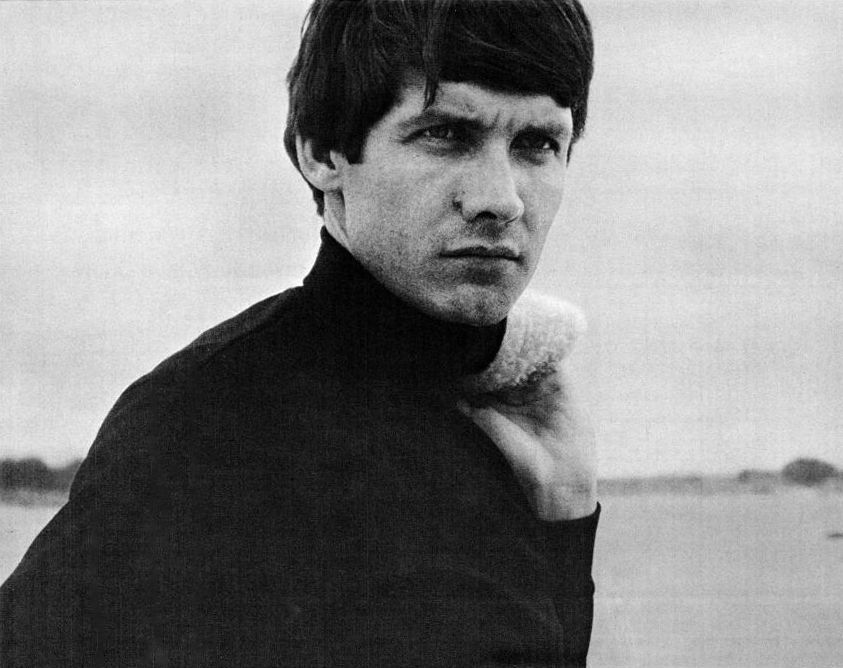
- Royal in 1966

Background information
- Born: April 3, 1942; Valdosta, Georgia, U.S.
- Died: October 6, 2015 (aged 73) Morehead City, North Carolina, U.S.
- Genres: Country, Rock and roll, country rock, country soul
- Occupation: Singer
- Instruments: Vocals, acoustic guitar, piano
- Years active: 1961–2015
- Labels: Sussex, Columbia, Atlantic, Tower, Brylen

Billy Joe Royal (April 3, 1942 – October 6, 2015) was an American country soul singer. His most successful record was "Down in the Boondocks" in 1965.

== Life and career ==
Born in Valdosta, Georgia, to Clarence and Mary Royal, and raised in Marietta, Georgia, Royal performed at the Georgia Jubilee in Atlanta during his teens. He formed his own rock and roll band, and became a local star at the Bamboo Ranch in Savannah in the late 1950s and early 1960s, where his singing style was influenced by African-American performers, including Sam Cooke.

Royal was a friend of performer and songwriter Joe South, and recorded what was intended as a demo of South's song "Down in the Boondocks". The recording was heard at Columbia Records, who offered Royal a singing contract in 1965 and released his version of the song, produced by South. "Down in the Boondocks" remained his best-known song, reaching number 9 on the Billboard Hot 100, and number 38 in the UK.

He followed up his initial success with the singles "I Knew You When" (Top 20, 1965) and "Hush" (1967), also written and produced by Joe South. Another South composition, "Yo-Yo", just missed the top 40 in Canada and charted poorly in the U.S. when Royal released it in 1967, but a later remake by The Osmonds was a much greater success. His 1969 single, "Cherry Hill Park", peaked at No. 15 on the Billboard Hot 100. In the 1970s his recording of "Heart's Desire" gained popularity among Northern soul enthusiasts and was regularly played in Northern soul nightclubs.

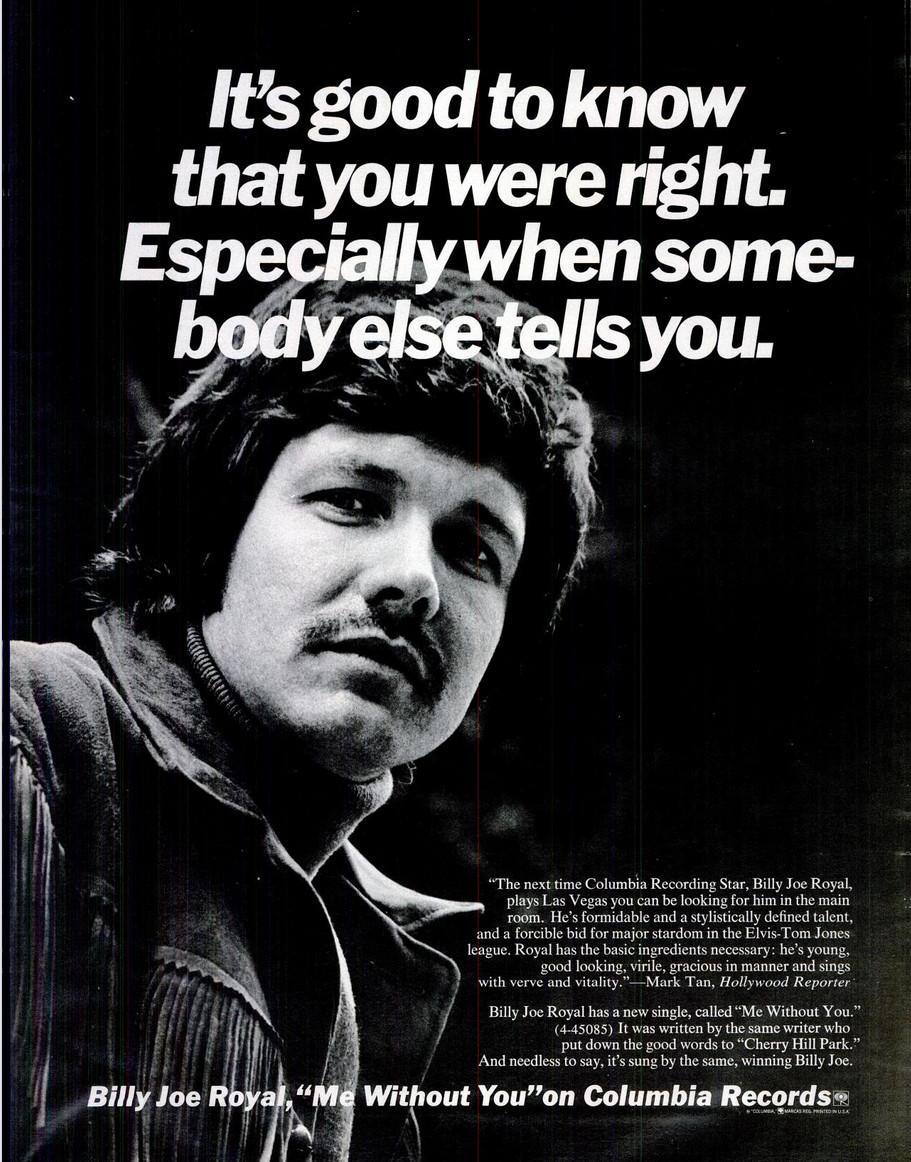
1970 trade ad

By the late 1970s, Royal had become a regular performer in Las Vegas, and also appeared as an actor in movies and on television. His last hit on the US pop charts was in 1978, when his version of "Under the Boardwalk" became a minor hit. However, he reinvented himself in the 1980s as a mainstream country star, and had his first hit on the country music chart in 1985 with "Burned Like a Rocket", released on the Atlantic label. His other country hits included "I'll Pin a Note on Your Pillow" (1987), "Tell It Like It Is", and "Till I Can't Take It Anymore" (both 1989). His successes on the country charts continued until the early 1990s.

Royal continued to tour regularly, performing concerts at casinos, music festivals, and clubs in North America, Japan, and throughout Europe. His set lists included a mixture of songs representing multiple genres from the 1960s onwards. He also played Robert Ally in the indie Western film, Billy the Kid (2013), co-starring country singer Cody McCarver.

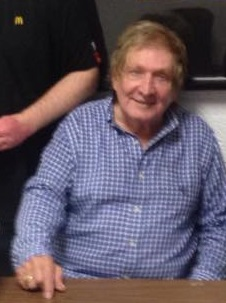
Billy Joe Royal in 2015, shortly before his death

Royal died in his sleep on October 6, 2015, at his home in Morehead City, North Carolina. He is buried in Greenwood Cemetery in Morehead City, North Carolina.
