= Hemp (disambiguation) =

Hemp is the vernacular English term for Cannabis sativa. The term may also refer to:

== Plants ==
- Cannabis, a genus of plants
  - Cannabis (drug), the use of several species of Cannabis (C. sativa, C. indica, C. ruderalis) as drugs, including marijuana and hashish
  - Cannabis cultivation, cultivation of the plants to produce drugs
- Boehmeria cylindrica, bog hemp, native to the Americas
- Crotalaria juncea, also known as "brown hemp", "Indian hemp", "Madras Hemp"
- Jute (genus Corchorus), particularly:
  - Corchorus olitorius, the primary source of jute fibre
- Kenaf (Hibiscus cannabinus), also known as "Ambari hemp" and "Deccan hemp"
- Manila hemp (Musa textilis), also known as abacá
- Phormium tenax, New Zealand hemp
- Roselle (plant) (Hibiscus sabdariffa), known as "Roselle hemp"
- Sisal (Agave sisalana), known also as "sisal hemp"

== Industrial and home products ==
- Hemp hurds, hemp wood, the inner portion of the hemp stalk separated from the fiber
- Hemp jewelry, made from hemp cord, rope, or thread
- Hemp juice, a non-psychoactive drink cold-pressed from cannabis leaves and flowers
- Hemp milk, plant milk made from cannabis seeds
- Hemp oil, extracted from cannabis seeds
- Hemp protein, the protein content of hemp seeds

== Entertainment and media ==
- Hemp for Victory, 1942 USDA film encouraging farmers to grow cannabis hemp for the WWII war effort
- Hemp Museum Gallery, a cannabis culture museum located in Spain
- Moscow Hemp Fest, an annual cannabis festival held in Idaho
- Planet Hemp, a Brazilian rap rock musical group

== Organizations ==
- European Industrial Hemp Association, a consortium of the hemp-processing industry
- Hemp Industries Association, a non-profit trade group representing hemp companies, researchers and supporters
- HEMP Party, "Help End Marijuana Prohibition," an Australian cannabis rights political party
- International Hemp Building Association, an organization of hemp manufacturers

== Other uses ==
- Hemp, Georgia, a community in the United States
- Hemp (surname), people with the name
- "Hemp", a song by Living Colour from the album Stain, 1993
- Hemp rights, legal protections for marijuana consumers
- High-altitude Electromagnetic Pulse (H.E.M.P.), a high-altitude nuclear electromagnetic pulse bomb
- Old Hemp (1893-1901), a stud dog

== See also ==
- Cannabis (disambiguation)
- Dagga (disambiguation)
- Ganja (disambiguation)
- Hemp in Kentucky
- Marijuana (disambiguation)
- List of hemp products
- List of names for hemp
