= Boots Woodall =

American singer-songwriter

Dennis "Boots" Woodall (October 9, 1921 – January 27, 1988) was a country musician active from the 1930s to the early 1960s, in the American South and Midwest. Woodall was born in Paulding County, Georgia in 1921. After participating in a number of bands and serving in World War II, he formed the Radio Wranglers, whose name was changed to the TV Wranglers in 1949. The TV Wranglers were seen on WAGA-TV of Atlanta, Georgia.

Along with Bill Lowery, Boots Woodall was instrumental in forming the National Recording Corporation. As vice-president of the company, he not only produced sessions but leased many recordings that were released on the National Recording Corporation label. Chief among these was "Robbin' The Cradle" by Chicago vocalist Tony Bellus. The Bellus single registered in the Top 40 in 1959, and Woodall was involved in production of a subsequent album.

In 1988, Woodall died in an automobile accident in Atlanta. He was inducted into the Georgia Music Hall of Fame in 1997.
