= Hamp =

Hamp may refer to:

== People ==
- Lionel Hampton (1908–2002), American jazz musician nicknamed "Hamp"
- Hampton Hamp Pool (1915–2000), American football player
- Elijah Hampton Hamp Tanner (1927–2004), American football player, head coach and scout
- Hamp Atkinson (1933–2016), American politician
- Hamp Swain (1929–2018), American radio disc jockey
- Eric P. Hamp (1920–2019), American linguist
- Johnnie Hamp, British retired television producer
- Sheila Ford Hamp (born 1951), American businessperson, principal owner and chairperson of the Detroit Lions of the National Football League
- Sven-Erik Hamp, Swedish periodontist who classified dental furcation defects

== Other uses ==
- Hamp, a version of the Mitsubishi A6M Zero Japanese World War II fighter airplane
- A suburb of Bridgwater in North Petherton, a civil parish in Somerset, England
- HAMP gene, which codes for the Hepcidin protein
- Home Affordable Modification Program (HAMP), a US government home loan modification program

== See also ==
- River Hamps, Staffordshire, England
- Hemp (disambiguation)
- Hump (disambiguation)
