= Dagga (disambiguation) =

Dagga is a word used in certain areas of Southern Africa for cannabis.

Dagga may also refer to:

- Dagga (percussion), the stick used on the bass end of a dhol
- Dagga (Tabla), a musical instrument and part of tabla
- Dagga Couple (or DC), a South African pro-cannabis lobbyist organisation
- Dagga Party, a South African political party founded in 2009
- Leonotis leonurus, "wild dagga", a plant species in the mint family Lamiaceae
- Daggering, a Jamaican dance
- Earthen plaster, a blend of clay, aggregate, and fiber used as building material
- Dagga (condiment), a salsa-like condiment or salad common in Gazan cuisine
