= Georgia Music Hall of Fame =

Museum and hall of fame in Macon, Georgia

Georgia Music Hall of Fame museum
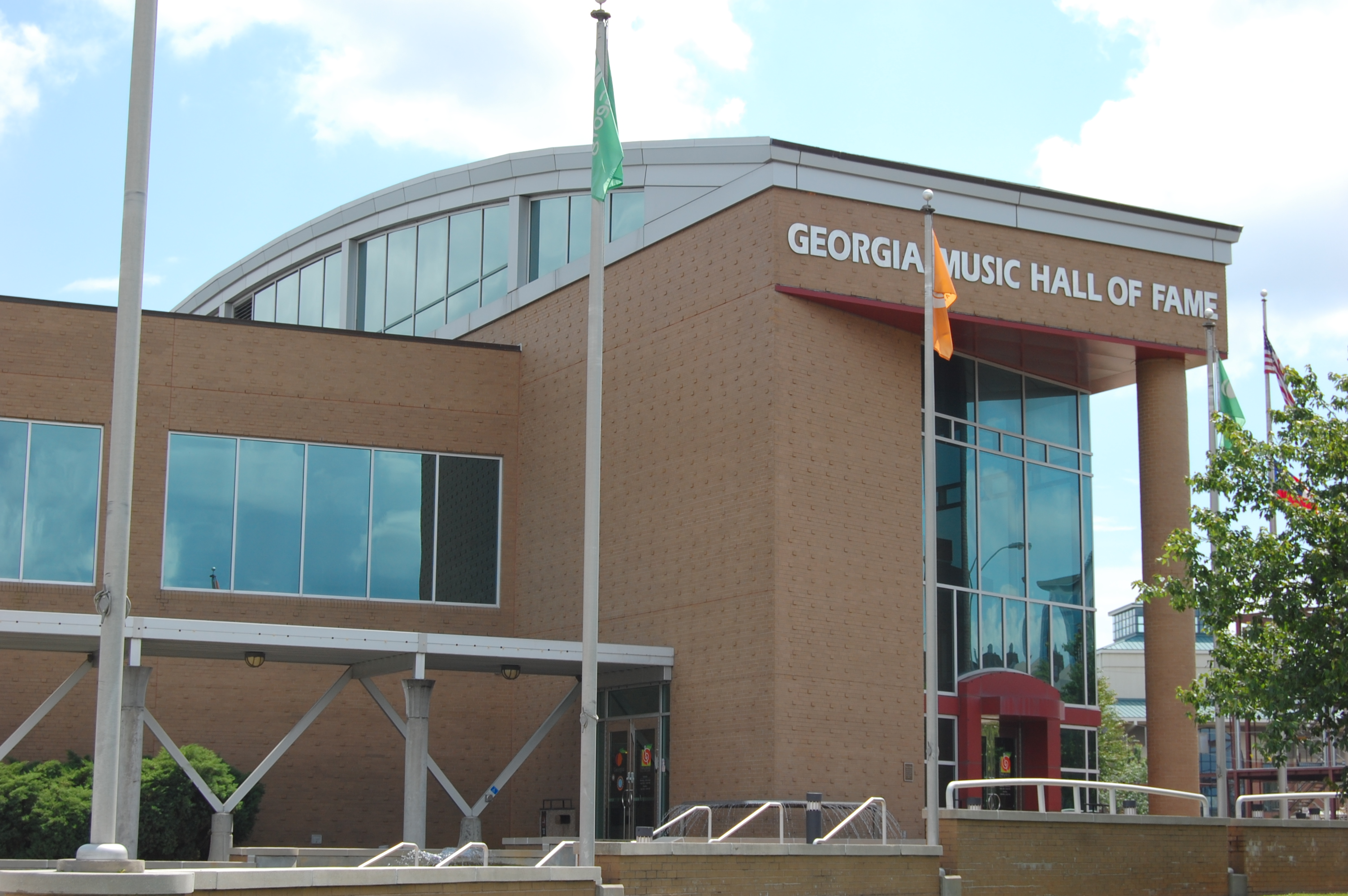
- Georgia Music Hall of Fame museum building
- Established: September 22, 1996
- Dissolved: June 12, 2011
- Location: Macon, Georgia, United States
- Coordinates: 32.8362°N 83.6220°W
- Type: Hall of fame
- Website: gamusichall.com

The Georgia Music Hall of Fame was a hall of fame to recognize music performers and music industry professionals from or connected to the state of Georgia. It began with efforts of the state's lieutenant governor Zell Miller to attract the music industry to Georgia. Following the first Georgia Music Week in 1978, the first Georgia Music Hall of Fame Awards were held in 1979, with two inductees. The hall eventually had 163 inductees; the final inductions were made in 2015.

The Georgia Music Hall of Fame Museum was located in downtown Macon, Georgia, United States, from 1996 until it closed in 2011. The Hall of Fame museum preserved and interpreted the state's musical heritage through programs of collection, exhibition, education, and performance; it attempted to foster an appreciation for Georgia music and tried to stimulate economic growth through a variety of dynamic partnerships and initiatives statewide. The museum closed due to low attendance and reduced state funding. Mercer University purchased the former Hall of Fame museum building in June 2012; the university used the building for expanded programs within its School of Medicine.

== History ==
The Georgia Music Hall of Fame's institutional history began in 1978 when the Georgia General Assembly created the Senate Music Recording Industry Committee to study the state's music industry's economic impact and explore ways to promote Georgia music and attract music businesses to the state. In 1979, the Committee developed a Georgia Music Hall of Fame program honoring Georgia musicians who have made significant contributions to the music industry, with Ray Charles and music publisher Bill Lowery named the first inductees on September 26, 1979.

Owing much to the vision of then Lt. Governor Zell Miller, the Committee also endeavored to create a public museum and archive to document the state's music heritage and serve as a cultural heritage destination. In 1990, the Georgia Music Hall of Fame Authority was created as an instrumentality of the State of Georgia and a public corporation with the stated corporate purpose and general nature: 1) to construct and maintain a facility to house the Georgia Music Hall of Fame; 2) to operate, advertise and promote the Georgia Music Hall of Fame; and 3) to promote music events at the facility and throughout the state. On September 22, 1996, the Georgia Music Hall of Fame opened as a 43,000-square-foot (4,000 m^{2}) facility housing the main exhibit hall, a retail store, the Zell Miller Center for Georgia Music Studies, an administrative wing, a classroom, and a reception room. In 1999, the second phase of the museum, The Billy Watson Music Factory, an interactive and interpretive exhibit space for pre-K through elementary students, opened.

The hall was closed on June 12, 2011, due to lack of attendance, and the collection was donated to the University of Georgia Special Collections Libraries. The exhibits are now housed at the University of Georgia, Georgia State University, the University of West Georgia, and in private collections.

== Museum ==
=== Exhibits ===
The Georgia Music Hall of Fame's permanent exhibit space was designed to resemble a Georgia town where venues such as the Jazz and Swing Club, Vintage Vinyl, and Rhythm & Blues Revue house artifacts, interpretive text, and audio-visual elements. Temporary exhibits included "Keeps Calling Me Home: A Gram Parsons Retrospective", "Let Freedom Sing: Music and the Civil Rights Movement" and '"Otis Redding: I've Got Dreams to Remember", named "Museum Exhibition of the Year" in 2008 by the Georgia Association of Museums and Galleries.

=== Education ===
Education was at the core of the Georgia Music Hall of Fame museum's mission. The Billy Watson Music Factory served children in grades pre-K through elementary by encouraging the exploration of musical concepts like rhythm, melody, and composition in a hands-on learning environment. MIKE (Music in Kids' Education) provided a series of programs offering live music performances and music instruction opportunities throughout the year.

== Georgia Music magazine ==
The Georgia Music Hall of Fame Foundation published the quarterly magazine, Georgia Music, from 2005 to 2013 as both the official museum magazine and an in-depth look at Georgia music. The state's legends, landmarks, and unsung heroes were explored through features, historical articles, news, and reviews.

== Inductees ==
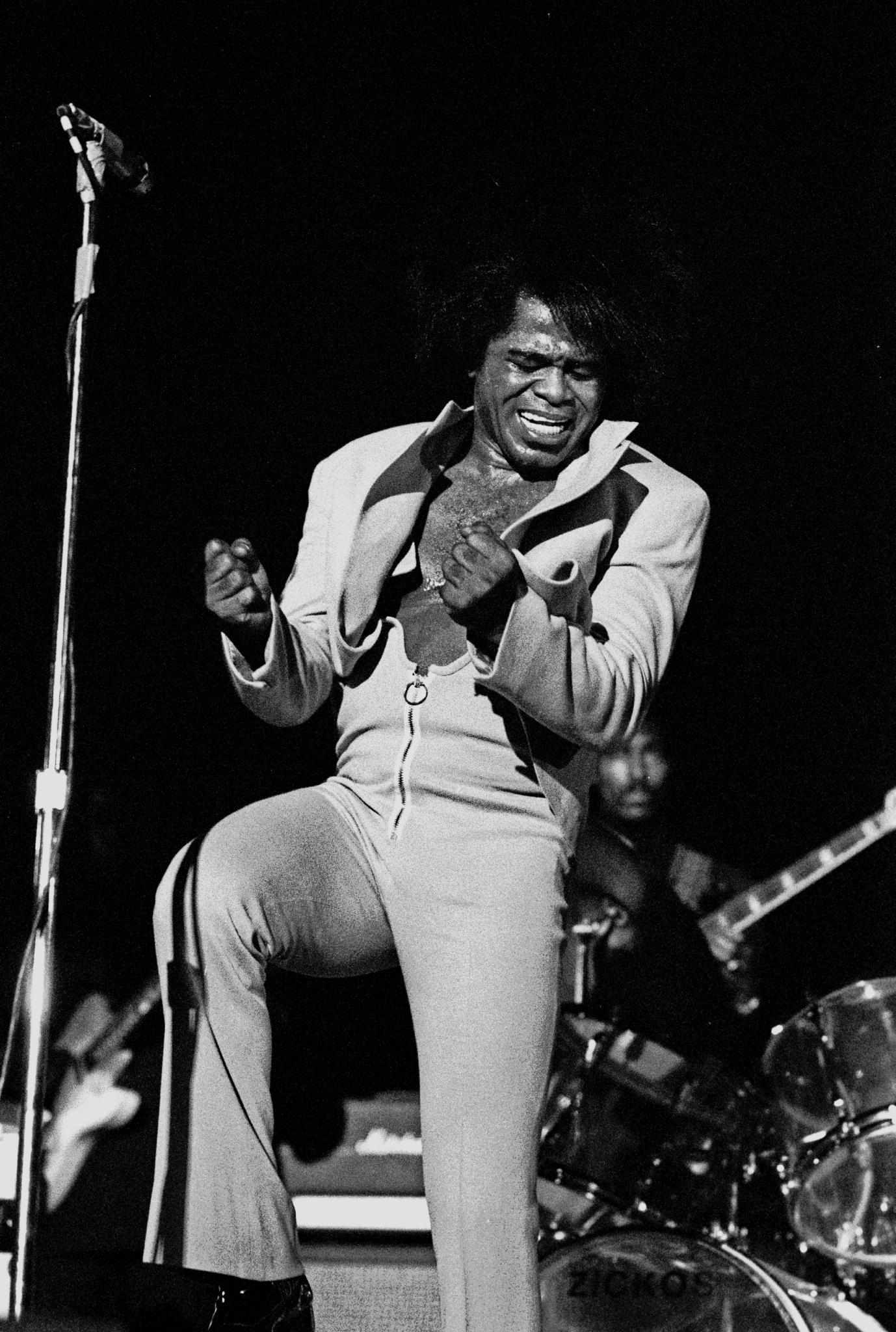
James Brown

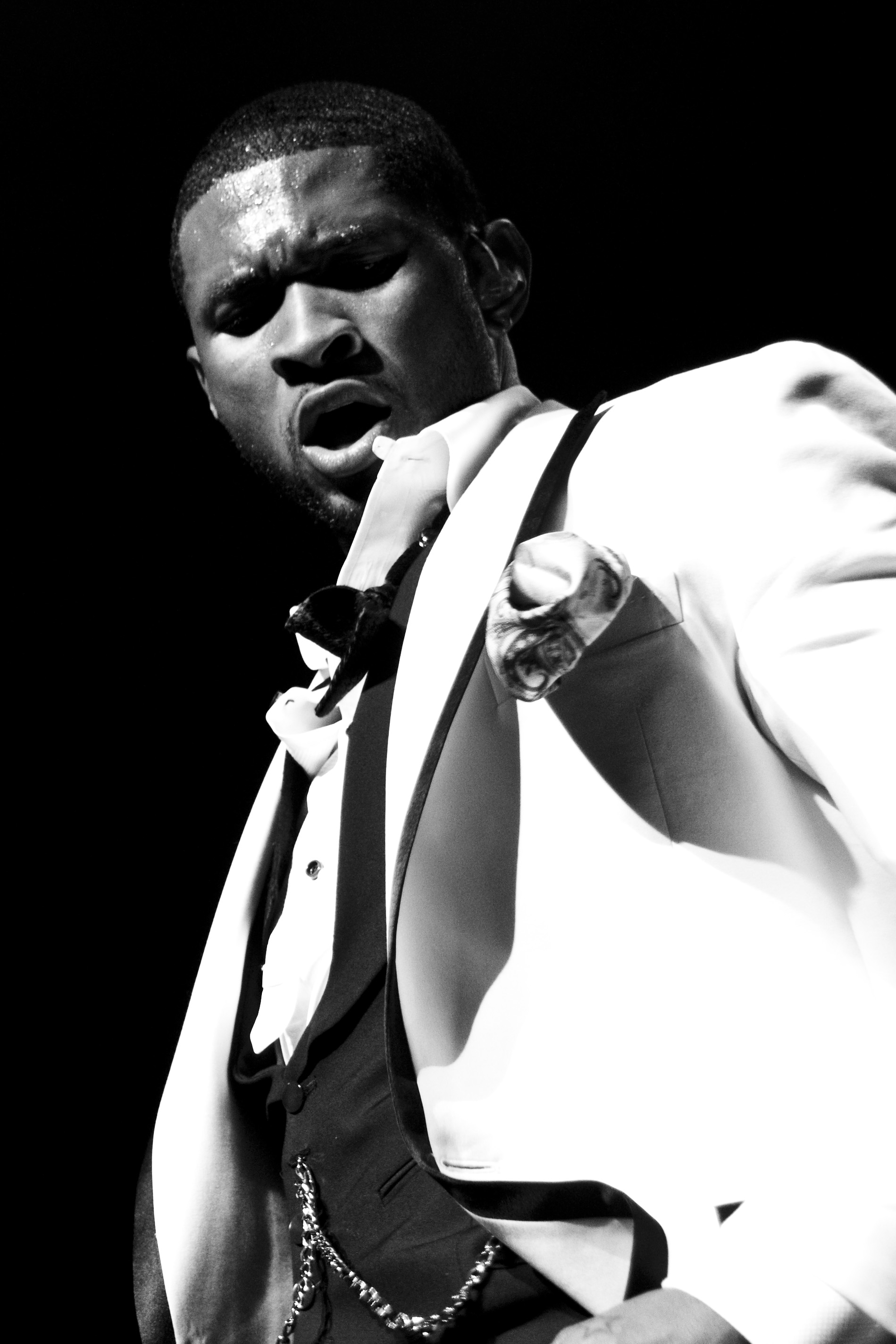
Usher

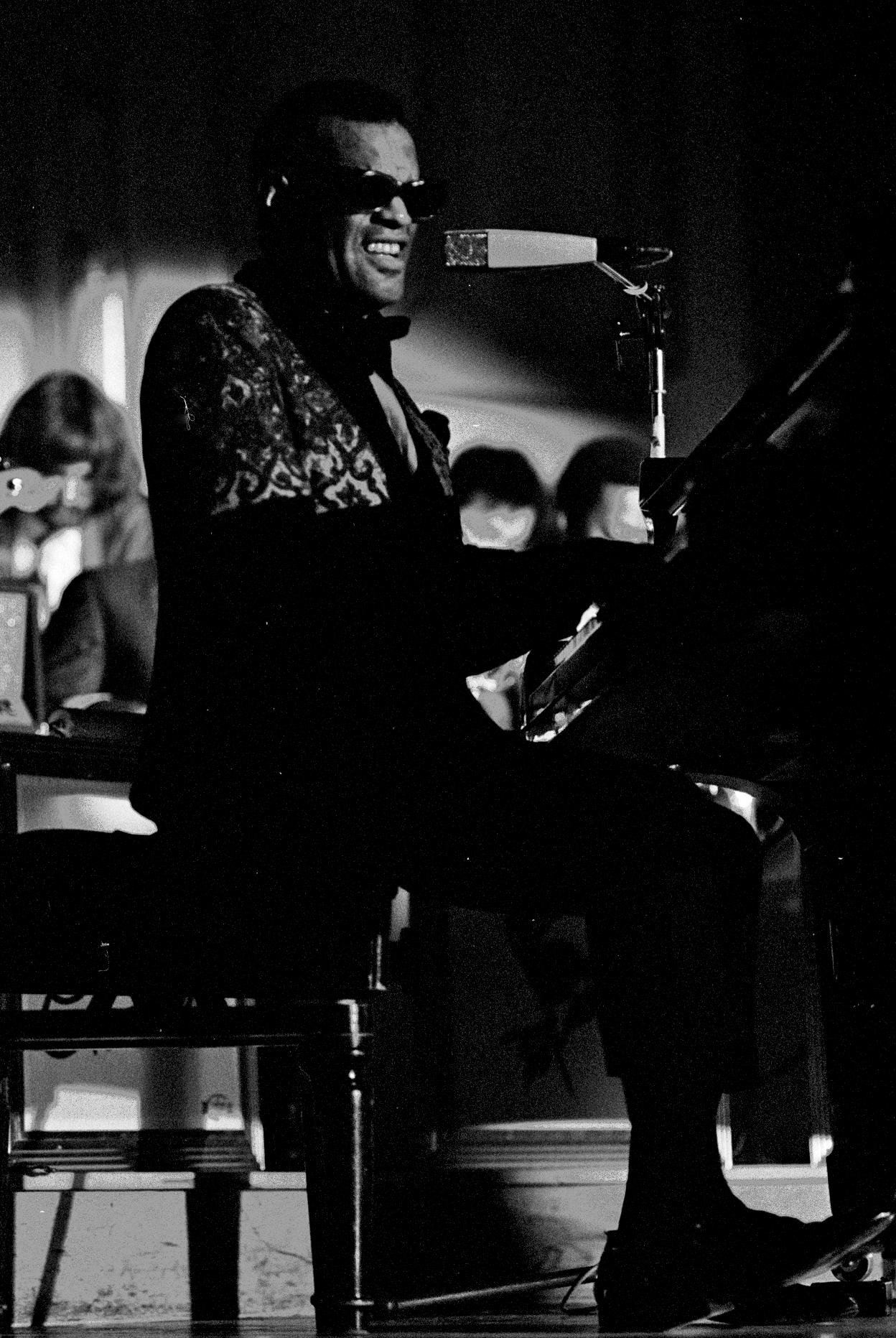
Ray Charles

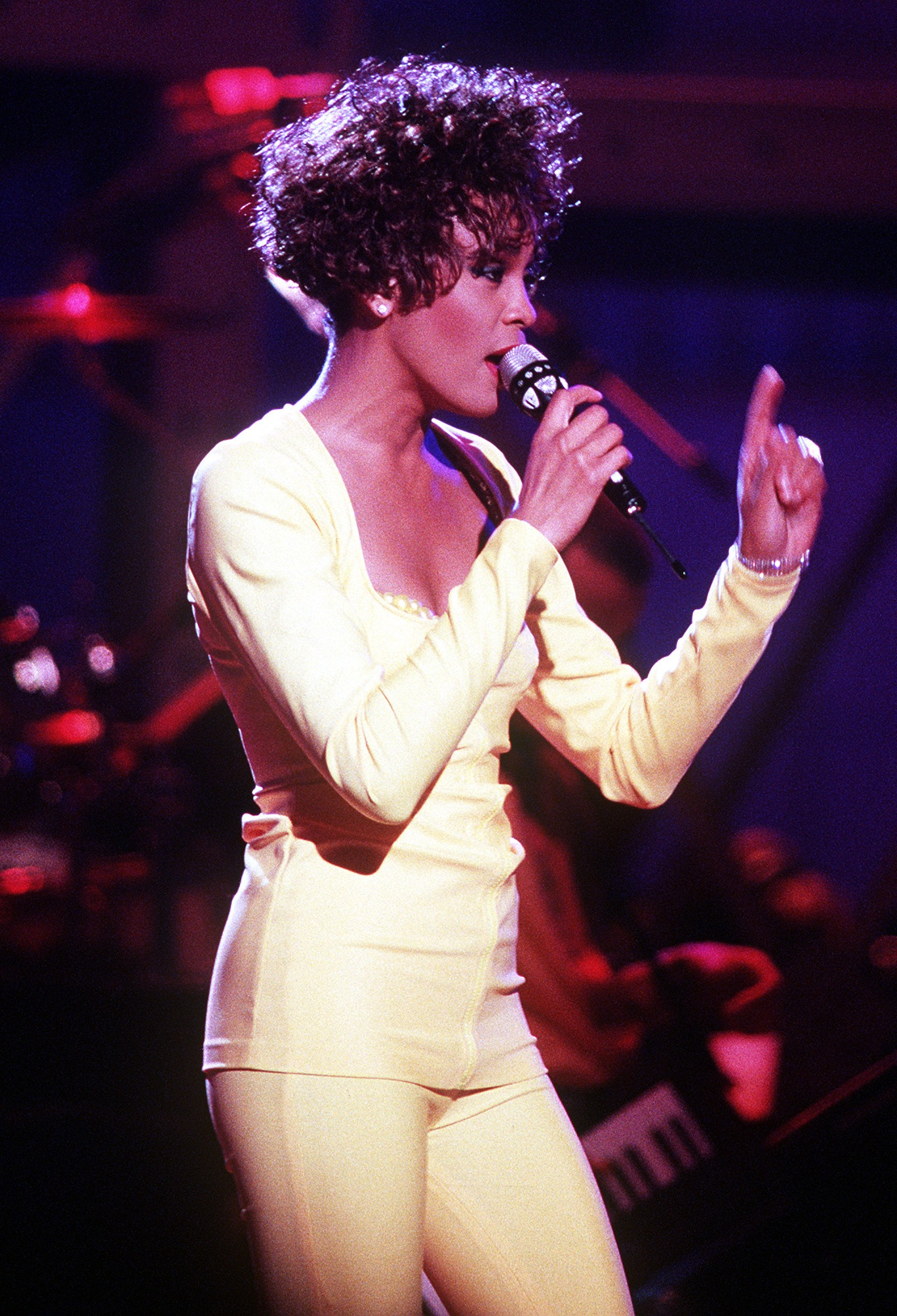
Whitney Houston

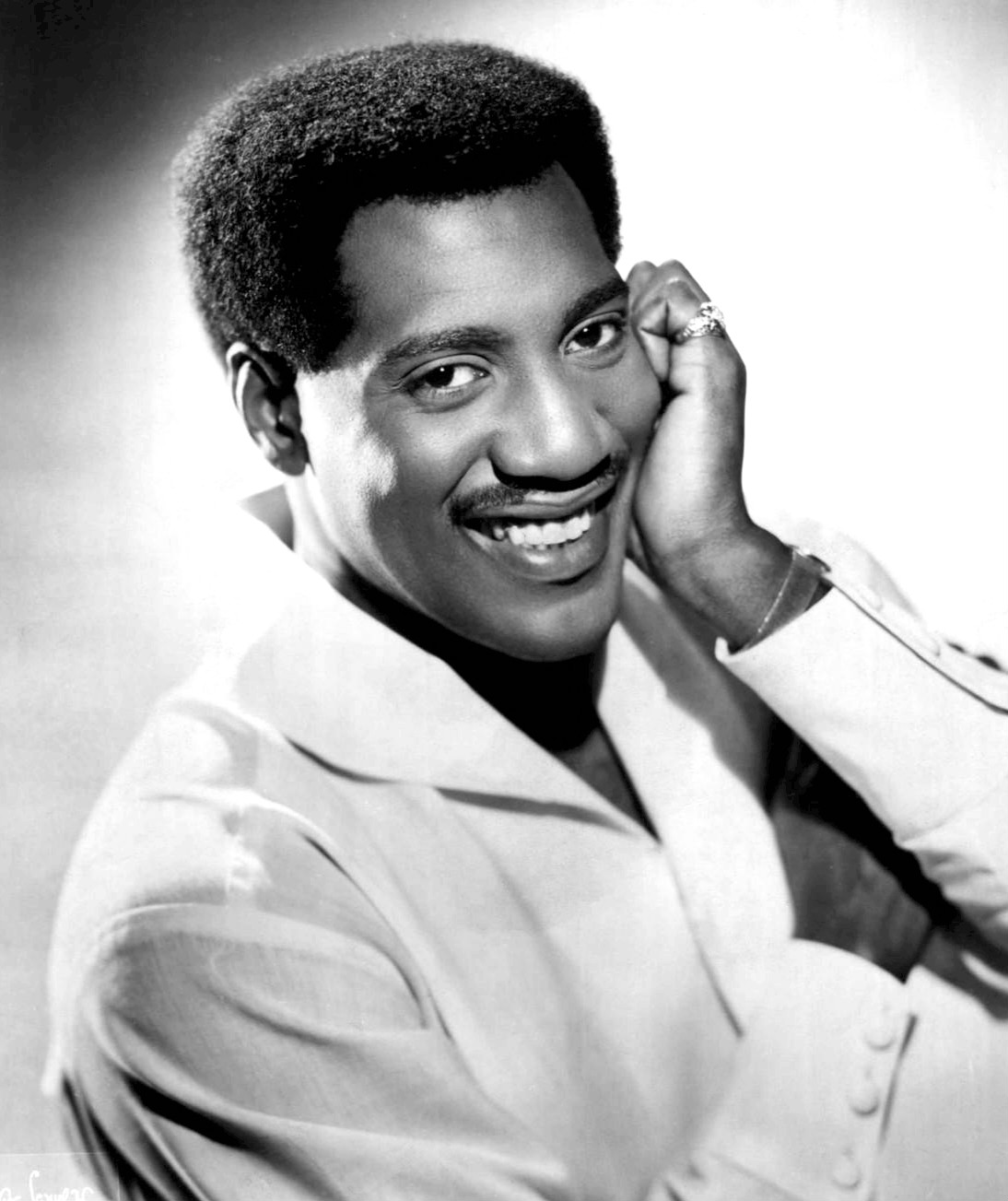
Otis Redding

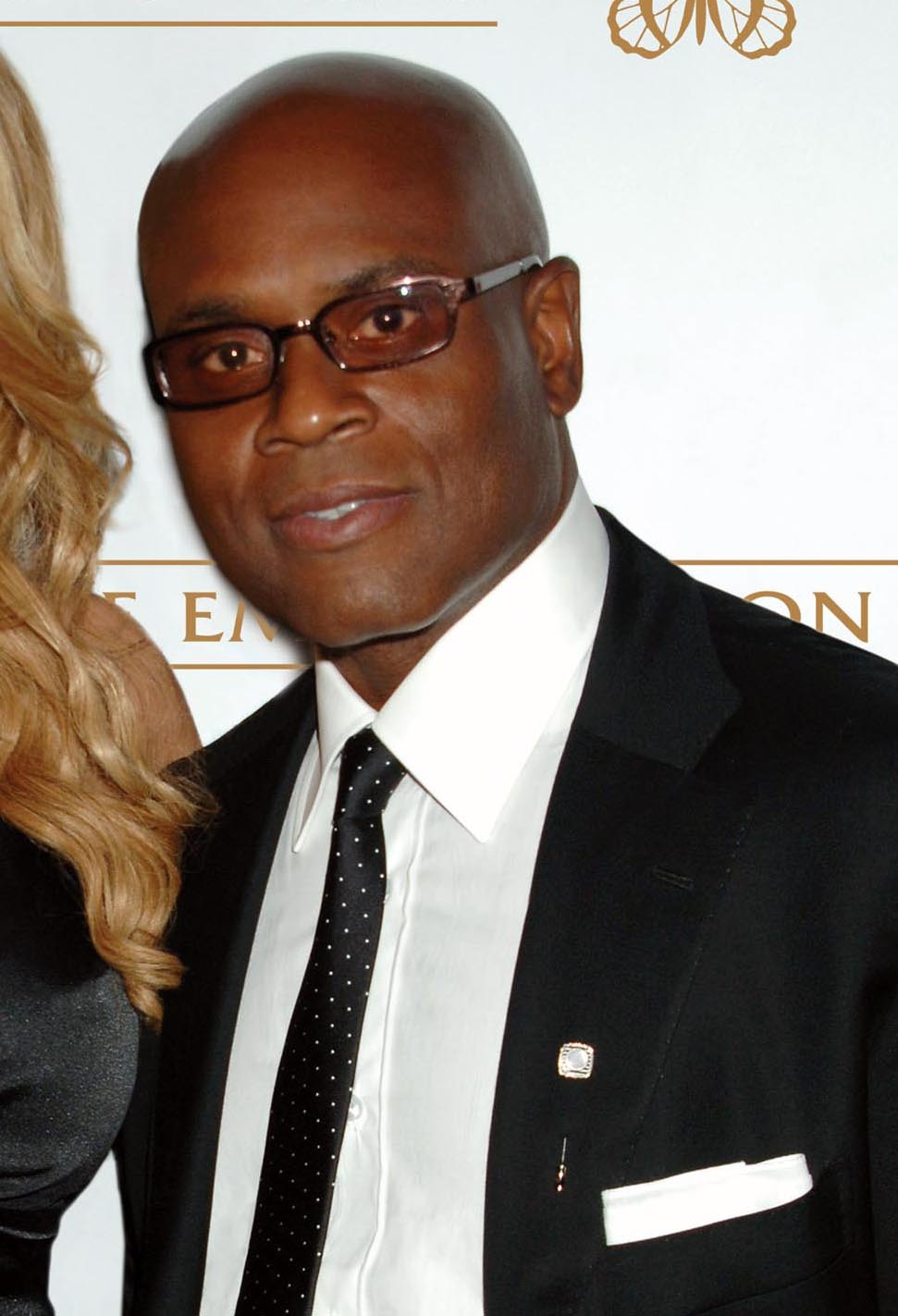
L.A. Reid

Year	Artist	Award	Reference
2015	Gregg Allman	Songwriter Award	
2015	John and Jane Barbe	Pioneer Award	
2015	Drivin' N' Cryin'	Group Award	
2015	John Huie	Non-Performer Award	
2015	Sam Moore	Performer Award	
2015	Monica Pearson	Chairman's Award	
2015	Sonny Limbaugh	Posthumous Award	
2015	Philip Walden Jr.	Posthumous Award	
2015	Tim Wilson	Posthumous Award	
2014	Danny Beard	Non-Performer Award	
2014	Bobby Byrd	Posthumous Award	
2014	Sean Costello	Posthumous Award	
2014	Frank Fenter	Posthumous Award	
2014	Wally Fowler	Posthumous Award	
2014	Jeff Foxworthy	Spoken Word Award	
2014	Eddie Horst	Posthumous Award	
2014	Lady Antebellum	Performer Award	
2014	Francine Reed	Pioneer Award	
2014	Ed Roland	Songwriter Award	
2014	Wet Willie	Group Award	
2013	Pat Alger	Songwriter Award	
2013	The Forester Sisters	Pioneer Award	
2013	Goodie Mob	Performer Award	
2013	CeeLo Green	Performer Award	
2013	Kansas	Group Award	
2013	James "Alley Pat" Patrick	Non-Performer Award	
2013	Whitney Houston	Posthumous Award	
2013	von Grey	Horizon Award	
2012	Riley Biederer	Horizon Award	
2012	Skinny Bobby Harper	Posthumous Award	
2012	Alex Hodges	Non-Performer Award	
2012	Johnny Jenkins	Posthumous Award	
2012	Gary Rossington	Songwriter Award	
2012	Robert Spano	Chairman's Award	
2012	Sugarland (Jennifer Nettles and Kristen Bush)	Performer Award	
2012	38 Special	Group Award	
2012	Bob Van Camp	Posthumous Award	
2011	Judy Argo	Posthumous Award	
2011	Toni Braxton	Performer Award	
2011	Paul Cochran	Pioneer Award	
2011	Hall Johnson	Posthumous Award	
2011	Kenny Leon	Non-Performer Award	
2011	Mother's Finest	Group Award	
2011	Jan "Mama Jan" Smith	Chairman's Award	
2011	Sonny Terry	Posthumous Award	
2010	India.Arie		
2010	The Black Crowes	Group Award	
2010	Rev. Pearly Brown	Posthumous Award	
2010	Charlie Brusco	Non-Performer Award	
2010	Paul Davis	Posthumous Award	
2010	Pete Drake	Posthumous Award	
2010	John Jared	Posthumous Award	
2010	Jennifer Larmore		
2010	Charles Wadsworth		
2009	Chris "Ludacris" Bridges		
2009	Dinah & Fred Gretsch (Gretsch Guitars)	Posthumous Award	
2009	Dottie Rambo		
2009	Hamp Swain		
2009	Keith Sweat		
2009	Widespread Panic	Group Award	
2008	Johnny L. Carson		
2008	Collective Soul		
2008	Peter Conlon		
2008	Bryan-Michael Cox		
2008	Roy Hamilton		
2008	Berry Oakley		
2008	Shakir Stewart		
2008	Third Day		
2007	Bobbie Bailey		
2007	Freddy Cole		
2007	Mylon LeFevre		
2007	Lynyrd Skynyrd		
2007	Babs Richardson		
2007	Usher		
2006	Gregg Allman	Performer Award	
2006	Dallas Austin	Non-Performer Award	
2006	Felice Bryant	Posthumous Award	
2006	Jermaine Dupri	Songwriter Award	
2006	R.E.M.	Group Award	
2005	Doug Johnson		
2005	Patty Loveless		
2005	NewSong		
2005	The Sunshine Boys	Mary Tallent "Pioneer" Award	
2004	Mattiwilda Dobbs	Mary Tallent Award	
2004	Hugh Jarrett	Non-Performer Award	
2004	Chuck Leavell	Performer Award	
2004	Mary Lou Williams	Posthumous Award	
2003	Mike Curb	Non-Performer Award	
2003	Indigo Girls	Group Award	
2003	Kenny Rogers	Performer Award	
2003	Alan Walden	Mary Tallent Award	
2002	Clarence Carter	Performer Award	
2002	The Harmoneers	Mary Tallent Award	
2002	TLC	Group Award	
2002	Tom Wright	Non-Performer Award	
2001	Roy Drusky	Mary Tallent Award	
2001	Alan Jackson	Performer Award	
2001	Ralph Peer	Posthumous Award	
2001	L.A. Reid	Non-Performer Award	
2000	The B-52's	Group Award	
2000	Little Jimmy Dempsey	Posthumous Award	
2000	Michael Greene	Non-Performer Award	
2000	Trisha Yearwood	Performer Award	
1999	Mike Clarke	Non-Performer Award	
1999	Jessye Norman	Mary Tallent Award	
1999	Gram Parsons	Posthumous Award	
1999	Travis Tritt	Performer Award	
1998	Allman Brothers Band	Group Award	
1998	Peabo Bryson	Performer Award	
1998	J. Lee Friedman	Non-Performer Award	
1998	Emma Kelly	Mary Tallent Award	
1997	Atlanta Symphony Orchestra	Group Award	
1997	William Bell	Performer Award	
1997	Dave Prater	Mary Tallent	
1997	Boots Woodall	Posthumous Award	
1996	Atlanta Rhythm Section	Group Award	
1996	Mac Davis	Performer Award	
1996	Joe Galkin	Mary Tallent Award	
1996	Rodney Mills	Non-Performer Award	
1995	Chet Atkins	Performer Award	
1995	Ray Eberle	Posthumous Award	
1995	Elmo Ellis	Mary Tallent Award	
1995	Joel Katz	Non-Performer Award	
1994	Isaac Hayes	Performer Award	
1994	Gwen Kesler	Non-Performer Award	
1994	Chuck Willis	Posthumous Award	
1993	J. R. Cobb	Non-Performer Award	
1993	Curtis Mayfield	Performer Award	
1993	Sam Wallace	Posthumous Award	
1993	Dennis Yost & the Classics IV	Group Award	
1992	Emory Gordy Jr.	Non-Performer Award	
1992	Connie Haines	Performer Award	
1992	The Lewis Family	Group Award	
1992	Ma Rainey	Posthumous Award	
1992	The Tams	Mary Tallent Award	
1991	Joseph "Cotton" Carrier	Mary Tallent Award	
1991	Roland Hayes	Posthumous Award	
1991	Lena Horne	Performer Award	
1991	Ray Whitley	Non-Performer Award	
1990	Wendy Bagwell	Mary Tallent Award	
1990	Blind Willie McTell	Posthumous Award	
1990	Ronnie Milsap	Performer Award	
1990	Chips Moman	Non-Performer Award	
1989	Lee Roy Abernathy	Mary Tallent Award	
	Fletcher Henderson	Posthumous Award	
	Gladys Knight	Performer Award	
	Harold Shedd	Non-Performer Award	
1988	Gid Tanner & the Skillet Lickers	Posthumous Award	
	Billy Joe Royal	Performer Award	
	Robert Shaw	Non-Performer Award	
	Joe Williams	Mary Tallent Award	
1987	Alex Cooley	Non-Performer Award	
	Felton Jarvis	Posthumous Award	
	Jerry Reed	Performer Award	
	Bob Richardson	Mary Tallent Award	
1986	Hovie Lister	Mary Tallent Award	
1986	George Riley Puckett	Posthumous Award	
1986	Tommy Roe	Performer Award	
1986	Phil Walden	Non-Performer Award	
1985	Bill Anderson	Performer Award	
1985	Graham Jackson	Posthumous Award	
1985	Eva Mae LeFevre	Mary Tallent Award	
1985	Zell Miller	Non-Performer Award	
1984	Buddy Buie	Non-Performer Award	
1984	Fiddlin' John Carson	Mary Tallent Award	
1984	James Melton	Posthumous Award	
1984	Little Richard Penniman	Performer Award	
1983	James Brown	Performer Award	
1983	Albert Coleman	Non-Performer Award	
1983	Harry James	Posthumous Award	
1983	Piano Red Perryman	Mary Tallent Award	
1982	Duane Allman	Posthumous Award	
1982	Boudleaux Bryant	Non-Performer Award	
1982	Brenda Lee	Performer Award	
1981	Dr. Thomas A. Dorsey	Non-Performer Award	
1981	Otis Redding	Posthumous Award	
1981	Joe South	Performer Award	
1980	Johnny Mercer	Posthumous Award	
1980	Zenas "Daddy" Sears	Non-Performer Award	
1980	Ray Stevens	Performer Award	
1979	Ray Charles	Performer Award	
1979	Bill Lowery	Non-Performer Award	

== See also ==
- List of music museums
