= Mamas and Papas/Soul Train =

Studio album by Classics IV
- Released: 1968
- Recorded: 1968
- Studio: Studio One
- Genre: Soft rock, blue-eyed soul
- Label: Imperial Records
- Producer: Bill Lowery

Classics IV chronology
Spooky (1967)	Mamas and Papas/Soul Train (1968)	Traces (1969)

Singles from Mamas and Papas/Soul Train
- 1. "Soul Train" Released: 1968; 2. "Mama's and Papa's" Released: 1968; 3. "Stormy" Released: 1968

Professional ratings
Review scores
Source	Rating
AllMusic	3/5 stars

Mamas and Papas/Soul Train is the second album by Classics IV, released in 1968 on Imperial Records. The album was reissued in 1984 by Liberty Records, with "The Girl from Ipanema" omitted from it.

The album scratched the Billboard Top LPs, peaking at No. 196. "Stormy" was a Top 5 hit on the Billboard Hot 100.

== Reception ==
The album was met with mixed reviews. Joe Viglione of AllMusic describes the album as a compilation of pop and soul acts, in which the band attempted to sound like the Mamas and the Papas. Bad Cat calls the album inconsistent, but praised the group for bringing an entertaining mix of commercial pop and blue-eyed soul.

== Track listing ==
All songs are written by Buddy Buie and J. R. Cobb, except where noted.

Side A
No.	Title	Writer(s)	Length
1.	"Soul Train"		2:40
2.	"Bed of Roses"	Buie, Cobb, Adkins	2:12
3.	"Strange Changes"		2:22
4.	"Ladies Man"	Buie, Adkins	2:15
5.	"Waves"		2:14

Side B
No.	Title	Writer(s)	Length
6.	"Stormy"		2:45
7.	"Mama's And Papa's"		2:06
8.	"Pity The Fool"	Buie, Goldsboro	2:08
9.	"It Ain't Necessarily So"	G. Gershwin, I. Gershwin	1:45
10.	"24 Hours Of Loneliness"		2:05
11.	"The Girl from Ipanema"	Jobim, Gimbel, de Moraes	2:28

== Personnel ==
Production

- Producer: Bill Lowery
- Photography: Marvin Lyons

== Charts ==
Album

Year	Chart	Position
1968	Billboard Top LPs	196

Singles

Year	Single	Chart	Position
1968	"Soul Train"	U.S. Billboard Hot 100	90
1968	"Stormy"	U.S. Billboard Hot 100	5
1968	"Stormy"	U.S. Billboard Easy Listening	26
