= Sunrella =

- Location within Gauteng Location within South Africa
- Coordinates: 25.947°S 27.935°E
- Country: South Africa
- Province: Gauteng
- Municipality: City of Johannesburg
- Time zone: UTC+2 (SAST)

Sunrella AH is an agricultural suburb north of Johannesburg, South Africa. It is located in Region A of the City of Johannesburg Metropolitan Municipality.

The area has experienced violent crime. In 2018, a man was shot and killed in a robbery after withdrawing money to pay for his wife's funeral. In 2020, a man, part of the Dagga couple, known for his activism towards the legalisation of dagga, was shot and killed in a home invasion in the locality.
