= These Arms of Mine (Otis Redding song) =

Single by Otis Redding

from the album Pain in My Heart
- B-side: "Hey Hey Baby"
- Released: October 1962
- Recorded: 1962
- Genre: Rhythm and blues, soul
- Length: 2:35
- Label: Stax/Volt
- Songwriter: Otis Redding

Otis Redding singles chronology
"Shout Bamalama" (1961)	"These Arms of Mine" (1962)	"That's What My Heart Needs" (1963)

"These Arms of Mine" is a song written by soul musician Otis Redding. Redding was at that time a member of Pat Teacake's Band, consisting of lead guitarist Johnny Jenkins, bassist Pat Teacake and vocalist/songwriter Redding, who also served as driver for Jenkins, who did not have a driver's license. Atlantic Records artist representative Joe Galkin showed interest in Jenkins and proposed to send him to a studio. On the way to a gig, Redding had the opportunity to perform the songs "Hey Hey Baby" and "These Arms of Mine" as Jenkins and house band Booker T. & the M.G.'s ended their sets earlier than scheduled.

The performance of the latter song was highly praised; Jim Stewart was so impressed that he offered Redding a contract to record for Stax Records of Memphis, Tennessee, which Redding signed soon afterward. "These Arms of Mine" became Redding's first-released Stax Records single, with "Hey Hey Baby" on its B-side. After a series of unnoticed numbers, the song "These Arms of Mine" became Redding's first successful single and sold around 800,000 copies. The song was also included in Redding's 1964 (Atlantic Records) Atco label debut album Pain in My Heart.

== Recording ==
As a member of Teacake's Band, Redding toured in the Southern United States, especially on the Chitlin' Circuit. These performance venues were safe for African American musicians during the age of racial segregation which lasted into the early 1960s. Lead guitarist Johnny Jenkins later left Teacake to become the featured artist with The Pinetoppers. Around this time, Redding met Phil Walden, the future founder of the recording company Phil Walden and Associates, and later Bobby Smith, who ran a small record label, Confederate Records. He signed with Confederate and recorded his second single, "Shout Bamalama" (a rewrite of "Gamma Lamma"), which he performed with his band "Otis and the Shooters". Wayne Cochran, the only solo artist signed to Confederate, became Pinetoppers' bass guitarist.

Around the time Walden started to look for a record label, Atlantic Records representative Joe Galkin was interested in working with guitarist Jenkins and proposed to send him to a Stax studio in Memphis. Jenkins, who attended disc jockey Hamp Swain's "The Teenage Party", saw Redding's performance with the backing band, but he was not satisfied with their performance. Subsequently, he offered Redding to help winning the contest; with his help he won several weeks in a row. On the way to a gig, Redding drove for Jenkins, as the latter did not possess a driver's license. Jenkins performed with house band Booker T. & the M.G.'s. When that set ended early, Redding had the opportunity to perform. The first song was "Hey Hey Baby", but studio chief Jim Stewart thought it sounded too much like Little Richard. The next song was "These Arms of Mine", which featured Jenkins on guitar and Steve Cropper on piano.

== Release ==
"These Arms of Mine" was released on the Volt sister label in October 1962, but charted in March the following year. The single sold more than 800,000 copies. It was included on Redding's debut album Pain in My Heart, which was released on January 1, 1964 by Stax on the Volt sister label.

== Reception ==
When Redding performed the song "These Arms of Mine" during a session, featuring Jenkins on guitar and Cropper on piano, producer Jim Stewart praised his performance and noted, "Everybody was fixin' to go home, but Joe Galkin insisted we give Otis a listen. There was something different about [the ballad]. He really poured his soul into it."

== In popular culture ==
"These Arms of Mine" was included on several soundtracks, such as The Boat That Rocked, Perfect Stranger, in the Lost episode "S.O.S.", Glory Road, EDtv, Road House, The Sapphires and most prominently in Dirty Dancing. It is also prominently featured in the TV series 12 Monkeys, including playing in the opening and closing sequence of the series and having an episode named after it.

== Charts ==
Chart	Peak position
Billboard Hot 100	85
Billboard R&B singles	20

From allmusic

== Certifications ==
Region	Certification	Certified units/sales
United Kingdom (BPI)	Silver	200,000^{‡}
United States (RIAA)	Gold	500,000^{‡}
^{‡} Sales+streaming figures based on certification alone.
