= Pain in My Heart =

Studio album by Otis Redding
- Released: March 1964
- Recorded: 1962–1963
- Genre: Soul
- Length: 30:17
- Labels: Atco; 33–161
- Producer: Jim Stewart

Otis Redding chronology
Pain in My Heart (1964)	The Great Otis Redding Sings Soul Ballads (1965)

Pain in My Heart is the debut album of the soul singer-songwriter Otis Redding. Redding recorded for Volt Records, a subsidiary of Stax Records, based in Memphis, Tennessee. Volt LPs were initially issued on the Atco label, which released this album (the singles were issued on the Volt label). The title song was written and arranged by Allen Toussaint, under the pseudonym Naomi Neville.

The album includes four successful singles, released in 1962 and 1963: "These Arms of Mine", "That's What My Heart Needs", "Security", and the title track. Since Billboard did not publish an R&B singles chart from late 1963 to early 1965, the R&B chart peaks of the latter two singles are unknown.

== Biography ==
As a member of the Pat T. Cake and the Mighty Panthers, Redding toured in the Southern United States, mostly on the Chitlin' Circuit, a string of nightclubs and dance halls hospitable to African-American musicians when racial segregation of performance venues was prevalent. Guitarist Johnny Jenkins, who helped Redding win a talent contest at the Hillview Springs Social Club 15 times in row and also at the talent show "The Teenage Party", left the band to become a featured artist with the Pinetoppers. Around this time, Redding met Phil Walden, the future founder of the recording company Phil Walden and Associates (even though without an associate), and later Bobby Smith, who ran Confederate Records, a small label. He signed with Confederate and recorded his second single, "Shout Bamalama" (a rewrite of his "Gamma Lamma"), with his band Otis and the Shooters. Wayne Cochran, the only solo artist signed to Confederate, became the Pinetoppers' bass guitarist.

At the same time, Walden started to look for a record label. Atlantic Records representative Joe Galkin was interested in working with Jenkins and around 1962 proposed to send him to the Stax studio in Memphis. On the way to a Pinetoppers studio session, Redding drove for Jenkins, as the latter did not have a driver's license. Jenkins performed with Booker T. & the M.G.'s, and when the session ended early, Redding received the opportunity to perform two songs. The first was "Hey Hey Baby", but studio chief Jim Stewart thought it sounded too much like Little Richard. Next, he sang "These Arms of Mine", which became his first single for Stax. After that performance, Redding was signed by Stax.

== Recording and release ==
Pain in My Heart includes songs from Redding's 1962–1963 sessions. Stewart signed Redding for Stax and released Redding's debut single, "These Arms of Mine", with "Hey Hey Baby" on the B-side. "These Arms of Mine" was released by Volt, a subsidiary of Stax, in October 1962, and charted in March the following year. It was one of his most successful songs, selling more than 800,000 copies.

In the 1963 session, "That's What My Heart Needs" and "Mary's Little Lamb" were recorded and cut in June 1963; the latter became one of the worst-selling singles by Redding. Rob Bowman, in his book Soulsville, U.S.A.: The Story of Stax Records, wrote that in these two songs "Otis sings with a harsh, impassioned gospel voice reminiscent of Archie Brownlee of the Five Blind Boys of Mississippi" and further reckoned the ending of the first would have made Redding "a superb gospel singer had he chosen to record in that idiom." "That's What My Heart Needs" became Redding's second single on Stax.

The title track, recorded on September, the next year, sparked some copyright issues, as it sounded like Irma Thomas's "Ruler of My Heart". After a few months, "Pain in My Heart", with the B-side "Something Is Worrying Me", peaked at number 60 on Billboard's Hot 100 chart. Rob Bowman observed that "with 'Pain in My Heart,' Otis's dynamic control is front and center as he uses his voice as a horn, swelling and decreasing in volume, swallowing syllables and worrying the word 'heart.'...It was Otis's most successful effort to date, commercially and aesthetically."

The last single, "Security", was released in April 1964 and reached number 97 on Billboard's Hot 100 chart. According to Matthew Greenwald of Allmusic, the song is "a stinging, up-tempo groover" and "showed Otis Redding stretching his funky rock & roll roots. Aided by the usual gang of Stax musicians, it's one of his tightest early records.... [T]he song could have easily succeeded as an instrumental."

The other tracks on the album are covers of popular songs: "The Dog" by Rufus Thomas, "Louie Louie" by Richard Berry, "Lucille" by Little Richard, and "Stand by Me" by Ben E. King.

Despite the alleged copyright infringement, Pain in My Heart was released on Atlantic Records' subsidiary Atco Records on March 17, 1964, and peaked at number 20 on Billboard's R&B chart and at number 85 on Billboard's Hot 100.

== Reception ==
Professional ratings
Review scores
Source	Rating
Allmusic	4/5 stars
Rolling Stone	4/5 stars
Encyclopedia of Popular Music	4/5 stars

Pain in My Heart received positive critical reception. In a retrospective review Bruce Eder of Allmusic gave the album 4 out of 5 stars, reckoning that the album "was practically a road map to Mick Jagger and any number of other would-be white soul shouters in the UK", and finding elements of hard rock in "Hey Hey Baby". He praised Redding's version of "You Send Me", considering it "the least stylized of any of his renditions of [Sam] Cooke's songs", but criticized Redding's restraint, compared to future recordings, and the "somewhat less than memorable" writing, except on "Security", "These Arms of Mine" and "That's What My Heart Needs". The reviewer concluded by saying "Redding exudes astonishing power, energy and boldness".

A review of several albums by Redding in Rolling Stone magazine observed that "[t]he title track on [Pain in My Heart] set the pattern for all his ballads to come—Otis triumphed at rendering agony. Signs of the singer's virtuosity are already apparent in the almost teasing way he lingers over some lyrics and spits out others; virtually never would he sing a line the same way twice". The review gave the album 4 out of 5 stars.

When Redding performed "These Arms of Mine" during his first session at Stax, with Jenkins on guitar and Steve Cropper on piano, producer Jim Stewart praised his performance and noted, "Everybody was fixin' to go home, but Joe Galkin insisted we give Otis a listen. There was something different about [the ballad]. He really poured his soul into it."

Cash Box described the title track as "a blueser with that funky Memphis sound and it’s treated to a heartfelt reading."

== Track listing ==
Side one
No.	Title	Writer(s)	Length
1.	"Pain in My Heart"	Naomi Neville	2:22
2.	"The Dog"	Rufus Thomas	2:30
3.	"Stand by Me"	Ben E. King; Jerry Leiber; Mike Stoller	2:45
4.	"Hey Hey Baby"	Otis Redding	2:15
5.	"You Send Me"	Sam Cooke	3:10
6.	"I Need Your Lovin'"	Don Gardner; Clarence Lewis; James McDougal; Bobby Robinson	2:45

Side two
No.	Title	Writer(s)	Length
7.	"These Arms of Mine"	Redding	2:30
8.	"Louie Louie"	Richard Berry	2:05
9.	"Something is Worrying Me"	Redding; Phil Walden	2:25
10.	"Security"	Redding	2:30
11.	"That's What My Heart Needs"	Redding	2:35
12.	"Lucille"	Al Collins; Richard Penniman	2:25

== Personnel ==
- Otis Redding – vocals
- Booker T. Jones – organ, piano
- Steve Cropper – guitar, piano
- Johnny Jenkins – guitar
- Donald Dunn, Lewis Steinberg – bass guitar
- Al Jackson Jr. – drums
- Wayne Jackson – trumpet
- Packy Axton – tenor saxophone
- Floyd Newman – baritone saxophone

== Weekly charts ==
Chart	Peak position
Billboard Pop chart	103

== Bibliography ==
- Bowman, Rob (1997). Soulsville U.S.A.: The Story of Stax Records. New York, NY: Schirmer Trade. ISBN 978-0-8256-7284-2. OCLC 36824884.
- Freeman, Scott (2002). Otis!: The Otis Redding Story. St. Martin's Press. ISBN 978-0-312-30297-9. OCLC 47443887.
- Gulla, Bob (2007). Icons of R&B and Soul: An Encyclopedia of the Artists Who Revolutionized Rhythm, Volume 1. Westport, Conn: Greenwood Press. ISBN 978-0-313-34044-4. OCLC 220310006.
- Guralnick, Peter (1999). Sweet Soul Music: Rhythm and Blues and the Southern Dream of Freedom. Back Bay Books. ISBN 978-0-316-33273-6. OCLC 41950519.
