= IHBA =

IHBA may refer to:

- International Hemp Building Association, an industry association founded in 2009
- International Hot Boat Association, which hosts the Lucas Oil Drag Boat Racing Series

== See also ==
- Institute of Human Behaviour and Allied Sciences (IHBAS or IHBA&S), a mental health and neurosciences research institute based in New Delhi, India
