= Medical, Dental and Pharmacy Act, 1928 =

South African controlled substances law

The Medical, Dental and Pharmacy Act, 1928 (Act No. 13 of 1928) was a South African law that prohibited the production, sale, and use of any "habit forming drugs." One impact of this was to restrict the use of cannabis in South Africa.

The 1928 act stated in Article 69:

No person shall smoke, or use, or shall import, manufacture, sell or supply, or possess for purpose of sale or supply to any person, any pipe, receptacle, or appliance for smoking opium, Indian hemp, or dagga or intsangu...

Per Vera D. Rubin, following this act only one license was issued for cultivating cannabis in South Africa, and one license for exporting cannabis, and neither was later renewed.
