= Cannabis in South Africa =

Situation regarding Cannabis (dagga) in the country of South Africa

Cannabis in South Africa is an indigenous plant with a rich historical, social, and cultural significance for various communities. South Africa’s cannabis policy evolution has been marked by significant shifts, particularly following decriminalisation by the Constitutional Court in 2018, and the passing of the Cannabis for Private Purposes Bill in May 2024, legalising cannabis for those 18-years-old and above.

Prior to the lifting of the prohibition of cannabis in 2018, advocates pressured the government to amend laws restricting cannabis that were first established in 1922 to allow exceptions for medical use, religious practices, and other purposes. The Afrikaans term commonly used to refer to cannabis is dagga (pronounced [ˈdaχa]), derived from the Khoikhoi word dacha, which was adopted by early European colonial settlers in the Dutch Cape Colony.

Cannabis is believed to have been introduced to Africa by early Arab or Indian traders, centuries ago. It was already in widespread use among South Africa's indigenous Khoisan and Bantu peoples before European settlement in the Cape in 1652. Additionally, it was traditionally utilized by Basotho communities to facilitate childbirth. According to author Hazel Crampton, historical Afrikaner recipes for teas and foods incorporated the use of cannabis. The plant's use was primarily associated with traditional African populations and individuals of lower economic status.

Long-term research conducted by the Medical Research Council (MRC) indicates that the number of cannabis users in South Africa was 2.2 million in 2004, which increased to 3.2 million by 2008. In 2003, Interpol ranked South Africa as the world's fourth-largest cannabis producer, and the Institute for Security Studies reported that a significant portion of cannabis seized in the United Kingdom, and a third seized globally, originated from South Africa.

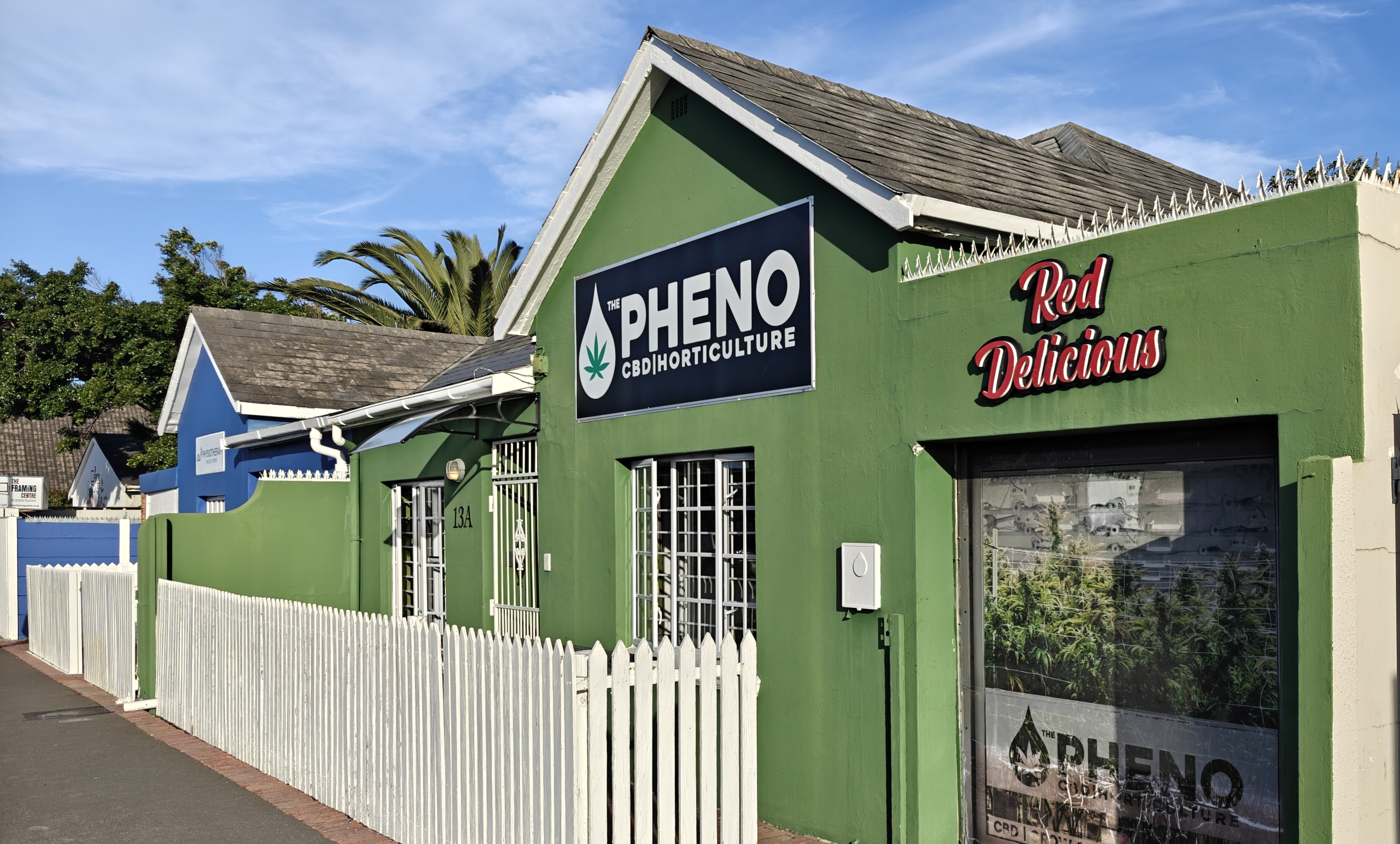
Cannabis store in Tokai, Cape Town

== History ==
The first written record of the plant in South Africa is by Jan van Riebeeck, who ordered officers of the Voorman to purchase "daccha" in Natal for trade with the Khoikhoi. The Dutch East India Company attempted to establish a monopoly on its sale, and to that end prohibited cultivation of the plant by Cape settlers from 1680. However, the ready availability of cannabis in the wild and through trade with indigenous peoples meant that there was little profit to be made. Consequently, the prohibition was lifted in 1700.

=== Provincial laws ===
Beginning in 1860, the Natal Colony began to import Indian workers (called "coolies" at the time) to supplement their labour force. These Indians brought with them the habit of consuming cannabis and hashish, which blended with local, extant African traditions. The European authorities were concerned by this practice, believing it sapped the vitality of their workers; consequently, in 1870, Natal's Coolie Law Consolidation prohibited "the smoking, use, or possession by and the sale, barter, or gift to, any Coolies whatsoever, of any portion of the hemp plant (Cannabis sativa)..."

Both the Cape and Transvaal colonies restricted the growth of the plant, which they considered a "noxious weed"; in 1891, the Cape Colony prohibited cannabis under Act 34, and the Free State outlawed dealing in cannabis in 1903. In 1908, Natal began to regulate the sale of cannabis. In the Transvaal, dagga was sold "openly and normally" by storekeepers to miners.

Although white farmers did cultivate cannabis in the 18th century and early 19th century, consumption by the farmers themselves was rare. However, even cultivation fell out of favour later in the 19th century. In 1921, "serious signs of a moral panic focusing around dagga" appeared, centred on the Western Cape. A concern developed about the "'camaraderie' which led some to lay aside race and other prejudices with regard to fellow" drug users.

=== National laws ===
In 1922, regulations were issued under an amended Customs and Excises Duty Act which criminalised the possession and use of "habit forming drugs", including dagga. Under regulation 14, the cultivation, possession, sale, and use of the plant were prohibited. The burden of proof for any defence against a charge lay with the accused; legal scholar Professor Chanock contrasted this with laws regulating alcohol at the time, which laws placed the burden of proof on the accuser; he reasoned that the cannabis regulations were applied differently because they were intended to target black people.

Following the Fifth Session of the League of Nations Advisory Committee on Traffic in Opium and Other Dangerous Drugs, it was at South Africa's wish, expressed by Secretary to the Prime Minister J. C. Van Tyen in 1923, that dagga was included in a list of prohibited narcotics, which list had hitherto been almost entirely concerned with opium and its derivatives. Cannabis was subsequently outlawed internationally in 1925.

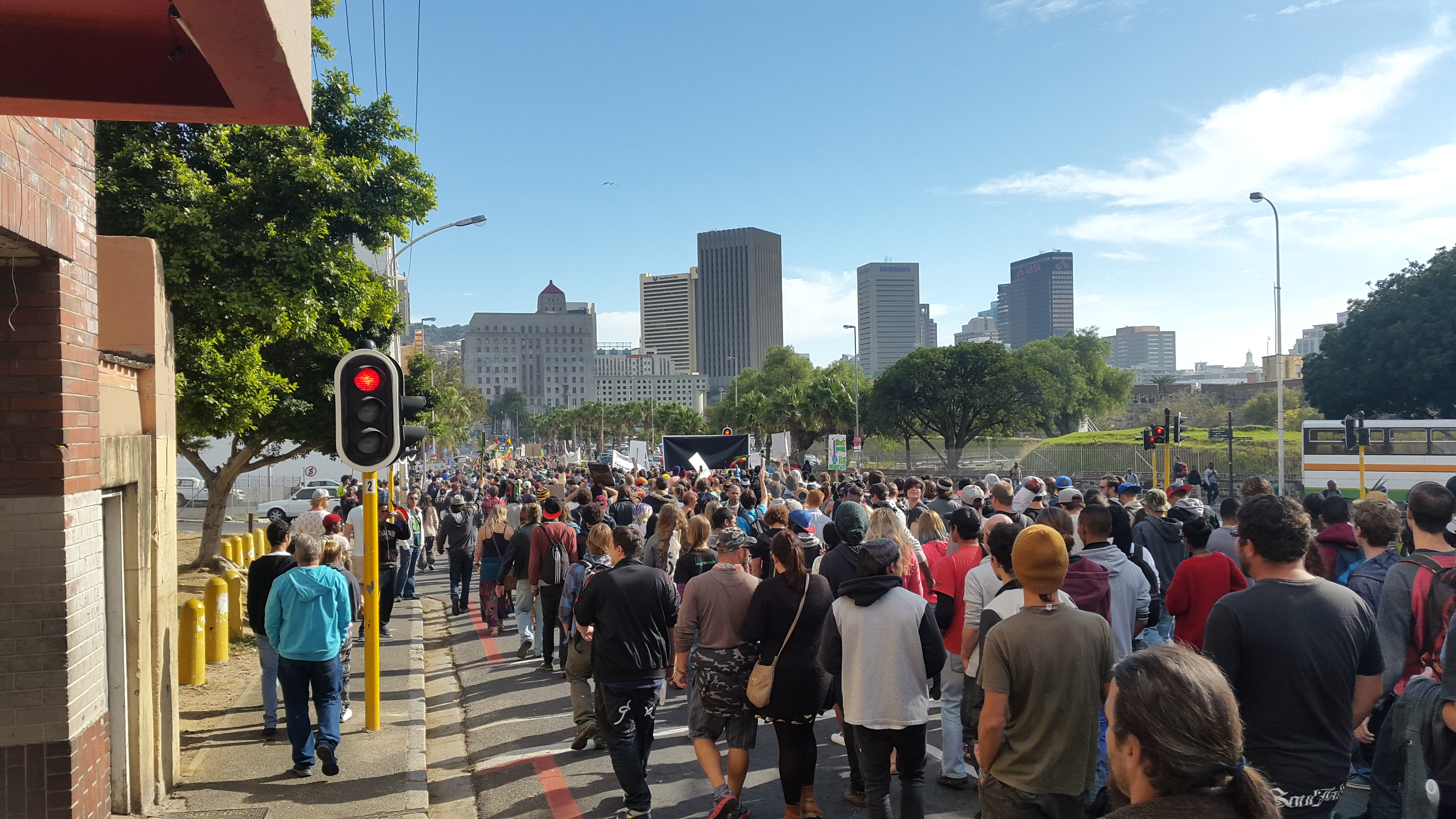
People marching in the streets of Cape Town against the prohibition of cannabis in South Africa, 9 May 2015

Cannabis was wholly criminalised in South Africa in 1928 under the Medical, Dental, and Pharmacy Act, for political and moral reasons. In 1937, the government of South Africa introduced the Weeds Act, which made the occupant or owner of a property accountable for preventing the growth of cannabis, or any other plant classified as a "weed", on the property. Concern about the extent of dagga use in South Africa continued to grow, resulting eventually in the enactment, in 1971, of the Abuse of Dependence-producing Substances and Rehabilitation Centres Act. Under the Drugs and Drug Trafficking Act of 1992, people found in possession of more than 115 grams of dagga were presumed to be guilty of dealing. However, following the adoption of the interim constitution of South Africa, courts found that this unjustifiably infringed the constitutionally enshrined presumption of innocence, and consequently invalidated those parts of the Act.

On 18 September 2018 the South African Constitutional Court decriminalized the use and cultivation of cannabis in a private space, and provided a 24-month period in which the Parliament of South Africa could amend the relevant laws, failing which the court judgement would prevail. Even though private use of cannabis has been decriminalized the buying and selling of cannabis, cannabis oil and cannabis seeds remains illegal.

== Cultivation, eradication, and bio-cultural heritage ==
=== Cultivation ===
Cannabis grows well in South Africa's climate, especially in the "dagga belt", an area including the Eastern Cape and KwaZulu-Natal provinces where, per the 2011 International Narcotics Control Strategy Report, it is a traditional crop. According to GroundUp, cannabis is "an important cash crop" that "sustains entire communities in the rural Eastern Cape", which otherwise survive in a subsistence economy. Rural farmers are typically poor and produce low quality local product that is consumed domestically by the lower class, while middle class growers produce product for the rest of the national and international marijuana market. Most of the national product is consumed domestically or regionally, but increasing amounts are seized in Europe.

In 1996, the Department of Land and Agriculture, the Tobacco and Cotton Research Institute, and the Southern African Hemp Company conducted agricultural research on the viability of farming non-psychoactive hemp strains of the plant in the North West province.

=== Eradication programs ===
The state conducted cannabis eradication programs since the 1950s. Police initially uprooted dagga plantations and burned the crops but in 1980 switched to using herbicides, which they would dispense with hand-held pumps. By the end of the 1980s, helicopters replaced ground patrols, and helicopter patrols would release herbicides aerially to destroy entire crops in minutes.

In 1990, a coalition of civil society organisations successfully lobbied government in the former Natal province to ban the herbicide paraquat from use in aerial eradication programmes. The South African Police Service (SAPS) now uses a herbicide formulation which includes glyphosate, and maintains that it is safe, posing "no threat to human, animal, or environmental health". However, a new coalition of the non-profit organisations Fields of Green For All and the Amapondo Children’s Project launched legal proceedings in 2016 to stop the SAPS from performing aerial eradications.

=== Biological and Cultural heritage ===
In South Africa, the third largest centre of biodiversity in the world, a number of Indigenous peoples and local communities have cultivated cannabis for long time and have developed special ties with the plant, including the custodianship of traditional cannabis plant varieties (genetic resources) and associated agricultural or medical skills and know-hows (traditional knowledge) which have been bioprospected for decades.

These elements are today protected against misappropriation and biopiracy by international law, such as the Nagoya Protocol to the Convention on Biological Diversity that the country has ratified or the GRATK Treaty signed by South Africa in May 2024.

Biopiracy is an ongoing issue in the country. According to the reform organisation Fields of Green for All:

there are cases of international research organisations taking advantage of small scale rural farmers, by exploiting their landrace genetics without adequate compensation or moral recognition.

== Medical use ==
In South Africa, medical cannabis products may be prescribed for any health condition, once the presiding physician determines that it could assist in treatment. Patients may request medical cannabis through authorised health practitioners who are licensed by the South African Health Products Regulatory Authority (SAHPRA). The health practitioner must apply online on their patient's behalf to SAHPRA. Once a prescription has been issued to the patient, it can be fulfilled by pharmacists registered with the South African Pharmacy Council (SAPC).

== Emerging markets ==
It is estimated that the African cannabis market will grow to be worth $7 bn by 2023, with the main stakeholders being Nigeria with $3.7bn, South Africa $1.7bn, Morocco $900m, Lesotho $90m and Zimbabwe $80m. The potential growth has acted as a motivation for legalization considering the traditionally stagnant economic growth of South Africa. A major driving force in the emerging market is European demand with Germany being the largest cannabis market in Europe.

=== Local Seed Banks ===
Besides the large overseas market which draws many investors into the new industry, the local South African market is proving to be another avenue for economic growth. The aforementioned plant, locally known as 'dagga', has had a long history in Southern Africa, dating back to the 1500's. This long history of cultivation within the area has led to the plant being socially accepted by many indigenous communities, with its acceptance spreading further within South Africa after the decimalization in 2018. This is clearly seen with the increase in hobby growers and local small-scale farmers who are curious about the plant, and its recently outlawed reputation. Before the decriminalization of Cannabis, procuring the seeds necessary to grow the plant was largely considered illegal and difficult. However, laws allowing people to grow the plant within their own homes as well as the government's mandate to not exclude the poor from the industry, has made the procurement of certified quality seeds a necessity.

=== Cannabis Clubs ===
Cannabis clubs in South Africa, commonly known as Dagga Private Clubs (DPCs), are gaining traction as a burgeoning sector focused on fostering community ties, promoting sustainable practices, and prioritizing harm reduction. These organizations typically involve small to medium-sized groups of adult individuals who collectively grow cannabis to supply the personal needs of their members. By sharing resources and expertise, these clubs maintain a self-regulated, closed-loop system where cannabis is cultivated and distributed solely among members for private, non-commercial use.

In South Africa, Cannabis Clubs currently operate in a legal grey area. The 2018 Constitutional Court decision legalized private cultivation, possession, and use of cannabis by adults for personal purposes, paving the way for the emergence of Cannabis Clubs. However, the commercial sale and distribution of cannabis remains prohibited, creating uncertainty for these clubs.

Typically, a Cannabis Club functions as a private, member-based collective where individuals can legally cultivate and exchange cannabis within the confines of the law. These clubs emphasize that they do not sell cannabis but instead provide a secure environment for members to share their personal harvests. Yet, the absence of clear regulations leaves clubs vulnerable to legal scrutiny, as authorities might view their activities as veering into illegal distribution. Until the government introduces precise legislation, Cannabis Clubs must tread carefully to stay compliant.

== Advocacy ==
The Dagga Couple (seated) with Jeremy Acton of the Dagga Party

=== Dagga Party ===
Iqela Lentsango: The Dagga Party of South Africa (more commonly known as the Dagga Party) is a South African political party founded in February 2009 by Jeremy Acton, who remains the party's leader. The Dagga Party was established to allow voters who support the legalisation of dagga to have representation in elections. The party's position is that cannabis users should have the same rights as people who use tobacco and alcohol.

=== Dagga Couple ===
Julian Stobbs and Myrtle Clarke are known as the "Dagga Couple" in South African media. In August 2010, their property was raided and they were arrested on charges of possessing and dealing in dagga. In February 2011, they argued before a magistrate's court that they had a "human right to ingest anything" they chose, provided that it did not harm them, and applied for leave to make their case before the Constitutional Court. Their case was struck from the court roll, pending the result of their constitutional challenge of the legality of cannabis prohibition.

=== Global Marijuana Marches ===
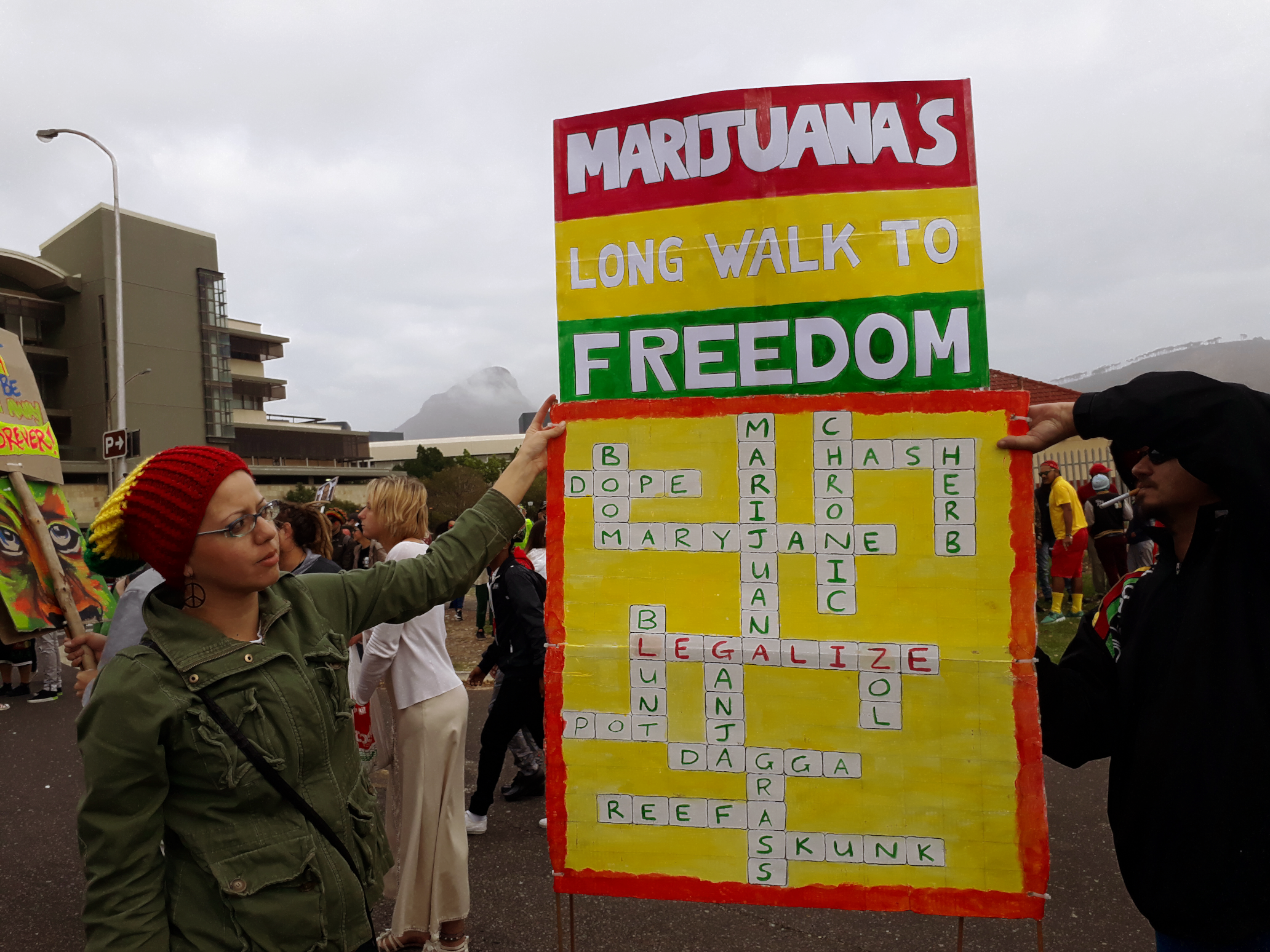
Cape Town Cannabis Walk 2017

Since 2000, as part of the Global Marijuana March and NORML initiative, Cape Town and other cities have hosted an annual pro-legalisation Cannabis Walk on the first Saturday of May each year.

About 400 people took part in 2012, a crowd of 500 in 2013, and "a few thousand" people marched in 2014/15. The participants increased to 3,000 in 2016, and to 6,000 in 2017.

=== Mario Oriani-Ambrosini ===
In February 2014, the Inkatha Freedom Party's Dr Mario Oriani-Ambrosini introduced the Medical Innovations Bill, which would legalise cannabis for medical treatment and industrial use. Under the proposed bill, with the patient's informed consent, doctors can administer unproven but harmless cancer treatments such as cannabis if other treatments are not efficacious; informed consent will shield doctors from common law liability and the requirements of their medical profession in such circumstances. Dr Oriani-Ombrosini was diagnosed with lung cancer, and had been on cannabinoid treatment in the last months leading to his death. Oriani-Ambrosini's bill was rejected by Parliament’s Portfolio Committee on Health in November 2017.

== Governmental regulatory bodies ==
=== Central Drug Authority ===
The official position of the CDA is that dagga should be decriminalised, reasoning that criminalisation has been shown to have little effect on the prevalence of drug use, and that decriminalisation could improve public health. However, the CDA does not currently support commercialisation of the plant.

In 2015, the Department of Social Development commissioned the CDA to conduct research into the feasibility of partially legalising dagga. That research is yet to be completed.

=== Medicines Control Council (MCC) ===
The South African regulatory body for drugs, the Medicines Control Council (MCC), initially classified dagga as a Schedule 7 substance, which meant that it had no medicinal value and was "illegal to cultivate, analyse, possess, research, use, sell or supply without authorisation from the Department of Health." In 2016, it published regulations providing for the use of dagga for medical reasons, and expressed a desire to reclassify "cannabinoid medication" as a Schedule 6 substance, which would make it available for medicinal use. However, the Dagga Couple noted that partial decriminalisation in 2017 has reduced the significance of the proposed change in scheduling, and have called for a more drastic reclassification of the drug.

=== Medicine Research Council ===
In January 2016, following a systematic review of scientific studies on cannabis, the Medicine Research Council concluded that there was evidence that cannabinoids could be used to treat chronic pain and spasticity in multiple sclerosis.

=== South African Health Products Regulatory Authority (SAHPRA) ===
The Medicines Control Council (MCC) was replaced by the South African Health Products Regulatory Authority (SAHPRA) in 2018. They have reclassified CBD as a Schedule 4 substance or Schedule 0 under certain criteria. Similarly, THC now falls under Schedule 6 or Schedule 0 under certain conditions.

== Other organisations ==
- In 2014, a report by the Anti-Drug Alliance of South Africa argued that the criminalisation of cannabis had "created victims rather than solutions", and recommended legalisation.
- The Police and Prisons Civil Rights Union have since 2009 recommended that dagga be legalised. They argued this would free up the police for other work, and would allow the South African government to benefit from cannabis by taxing sales of it.

== Decriminalisation ==
=== Initial Cape High Court ruling ===
On 31 March 2017, in a case brought by Gareth Prince, Jeremy Acton, and Jonathan Rubin before the Western Cape High Court, presiding Judge Dennis Davis ruled that any law disallowing the use and cultivation of cannabis by an adult in a private dwelling was unconstitutional and therefore invalid, on the grounds that such infringement of the constitutional right to privacy could not be justified. However due to appeals from the state, this decision needed to be confirmed by the Constitutional Court before taking effect. The court also ruled that, in the interim, prosecutions related to the transgression of the laws in question should be stayed. The judge further ordered that “it will be deemed to be a defence that the use, possession, purchase or cultivation of cannabis in a private dwelling is for the personal consumption of the adult accused”. The Central Drug Authority's chairperson David Bayever encouraged the Department of Social Development to appeal the ruling, citing concerns about the possibility of an increase in road accidents, and the difficulty in limiting children's exposure to the drug. After hearing all appeals in the Constitutional Court during the month of November 2017, the panel announced their decision to reserve judgment in the matter until further notice.

=== 2018 Constitutional Court ruling ===
After announcing their decision to rule on the matter, the full panel of judges convened on 18 September 2018 at the Constitutional Court in Johannesburg with Chief Justice Raymond Zondo reading out what he described as a unanimous decision. In his ruling it was stated:

- An adult person may, [sic] use or be in possession of cannabis in private for his or her personal consumption in private.
- The use, including smoking, of cannabis in public or in the presence of children or in the presence of non-consenting adult persons is not permitted.
- The use or possession of cannabis in private other than by an adult for his or her personal consumption is not permitted.
- The cultivation of cannabis by an adult in a private place for his or her personal consumption in private is no longer a criminal offense.

He placed no limits on quantities that adults would be allowed to carry, consume or grow and said that it would be up to parliament to decide once a bill was drawn up to accommodate these recommended changes. The government has been given a period of 24 months to implement the landmark ruling's findings.

=== Cannabis for Private Purposes Bill ===
First filed in 2020, the bill proposed no limits on the personal cultivation, possession, sharing and use of cannabis by adults and in private (out of sight). It makes provision for publicly possessing as well as gifting (without any exchange of remuneration) cannabis plants, seeds/seedlings and dried flowers, or the equivalents thereof. It also depicts what quantities will be considered as trafficable and commercial offences, leading to fines and/or up to 6-years and 15-years imprisonment, respectively.

During the four years of debates that followed the initial proposal, the bill was largely edited, with many controversial points withdrawn. The final version was approved early 2024 by South Africa's Parliament, and signed by the President on 28 May 2024 (on the eve of election day).
