= Steve Allin =

British author

- Born: 1955 (age 70–71)
- Occupations: author and hemp consultant
- Notable work: Author of Building with Hemp, founder of the International Hemp Building Association

Steve Allin (born 1955) is an author, teacher and pioneer in the use of hemp in construction and director of the International Hemp Building Association.

Allin begun using hemp and lime as a natural construction material in 1997 which led him to write and published Building with Hemp in 2005, the first published book on using hemp as a building system. He has contributed to The Green Building Bible and Local Sustainable Homes and has written articles for magazines Self-Build, Cannabis Culture, Construct Ireland, Energy Blitz, Hanf and New Observations Magazine. He founded the International Hemp Building Association in 2009, after hosting a symposium on the subject in Kenmare, Ireland.

He advocates the use of hemp as a construction material for its ecological production and low carbon footprint both as a material and the subsequent use, energy wise of the structure in a sustainable way and has stated.

Across the world communities and political leaders are grappling with the major issues of economy, employment and uncertain changing weather... So what are we all going to do about it? Kick the can down the road another piece?...An industrial crop is being identified as being able to provide many of the solutions to these aspects of our society but can a plant really do that? What on earth are these people talking about? Of course, the plant we are talking about is hemp, an annual crop that can be grown in just about every country on the planet and probably has been.

— Steve Allin, Can Hemp Really Be The Answer?, New Observations Art & Culture, 2017

Allin introduced hemp building to the US after holding a course in Prescott, Wisconsin in 2012. In 2013 he introduced the system to Finland when he held a course in Turku and then in Sweden in Kristianstad. He also introduced hemp building to Nepal in 2015, demonstrating the system for part of a hospital in Janakpur and again in 2017 to Costa Rica, teaching a workshop in Flamingo, Guanacaste. He is currently involved in projects to rebuild with hemp in the post-earthquake areas of Haiti and Nepal and is a senior adviser at HempToday magazine.

== Books ==
- Allin, Steve (2005). Building with Hemp. SeedPress. ISBN 978-0-9551109-0-0.
- Allin, Steve (2012). Building with Hemp 2nd Edition. SeedPress. ISBN 978-0-9551109-1-7.
- Allin, Steve (2016). Hemp Can't Save The Planet BUT It Might Save Humanity! ISBN 978-0-9551109-6-2.

== Contributor ==
- Hall, Keith. (2006). The Green Building Bible, Volume 1 [Paperback] Green Building Press. ISBN 978-1-8981300-3-1.
- Bird, Chris. (2010). Local Sustainable Homes. Transition Books. ISBN 978-1-900322-76-8.
- Allin, Steve; Anthony Cohu (2016). Hemp Building Best Practice Guide. ISBN 978-0-9551109-4-8.

== See also ==
- Bringing it Home the Movie
