= Tony Bellus =

American singer (1936–2025)

Anthony J. Bellusci (April 17, 1936 – January 21, 2025), better known as Tony Bellus, was an American vocalist and musician, whose first recording was with Shi-Fi Records in 1958. His best known recorded song is "Robbin' The Cradle", a self-composed ballad he recorded in his native Chicago in 1959.

== Early life and career ==
Bellus was born as Anthony J. Bellusci in Chicago, Illinois on April 17, 1936.

The recording of "Robbin' The Cradle" contained a number of styles and musical combinations. It combined an Italian pop singer playing an accordion à la Dick Contino, being backed with a country and rockabilly band, augmented with a background Latino vocal group.

Upon hearing Bellus perform the song in Chicago, NRC leased the master for the NRC label, and the song peaked at No. 25 on August 17, 1959, and stayed on the Billboard Hot 100 for 26 weeks, the most weeks for any Hot 100 entry all within the calendar year 1959. On April 20, 1959, Bellus performed "Robbin' The Cradle" on the Dick Clark ABC-TV weekday-afternoon program, American Bandstand. One week later on April 27 the song entered Billboard's Hot 100 chart at position No. 87, sixteen weeks later it peaked at No. 25 for one week.

Attempts at follow-ups were hampered when the original National Recording Corporation went bankrupt April 27, 1961. The company reappeared in 1962 under the aegis of Georgia theatre magnate Frederick Storey. The reorganization and a stint in the Army took the momentum from Bellus' career.

In the 1960s and 1970s, Bellus was a singing sensation throughout the Chicago area nightclub scene. He was a mainstay performer appearing nightly at Fritzel's restaurant at the corner of State and Lake Streets in downtown Chicago. Fritzel's was a personal favorite of local and visiting celebrities and dignitaries.

In the 1980s and 1990s, Bellus continued composing music, also performing at beach hotels and restaurants on the west coast of Florida, where he had relocated from the Chicago area.

The old NRC music library was purchased by Georgia music historian and producer Johnny F. Carter in 2004. Bellus returned to the NRC label with a CD release of the 1959 album that followed the success of "Robbin' The Cradle". Bellus' connection with the new NRC ended with the death of Carter in 2016 and rights for the NRC material reverted to Bellus.

Bellus was re-inventing his career through Bellusci Music Publishing Company and M.M.P. (Marathon Musical Productions), offering two new CD singles: "I Want Florida for Christmas" and "Mackinac Island", which is a remix and remastering of his 1986 45 rpm version.

== Personal life and death ==
Bellus resided in Florida with his wife Tammy, also a songwriter. Directing his attention to Christian music, he released the song "It Is Finished (e' finito)". Tony Bellus died after a long battle with cancer on January 21, 2025, at the age of 88.
