= Dagga =

Afrikaans word for marijuana

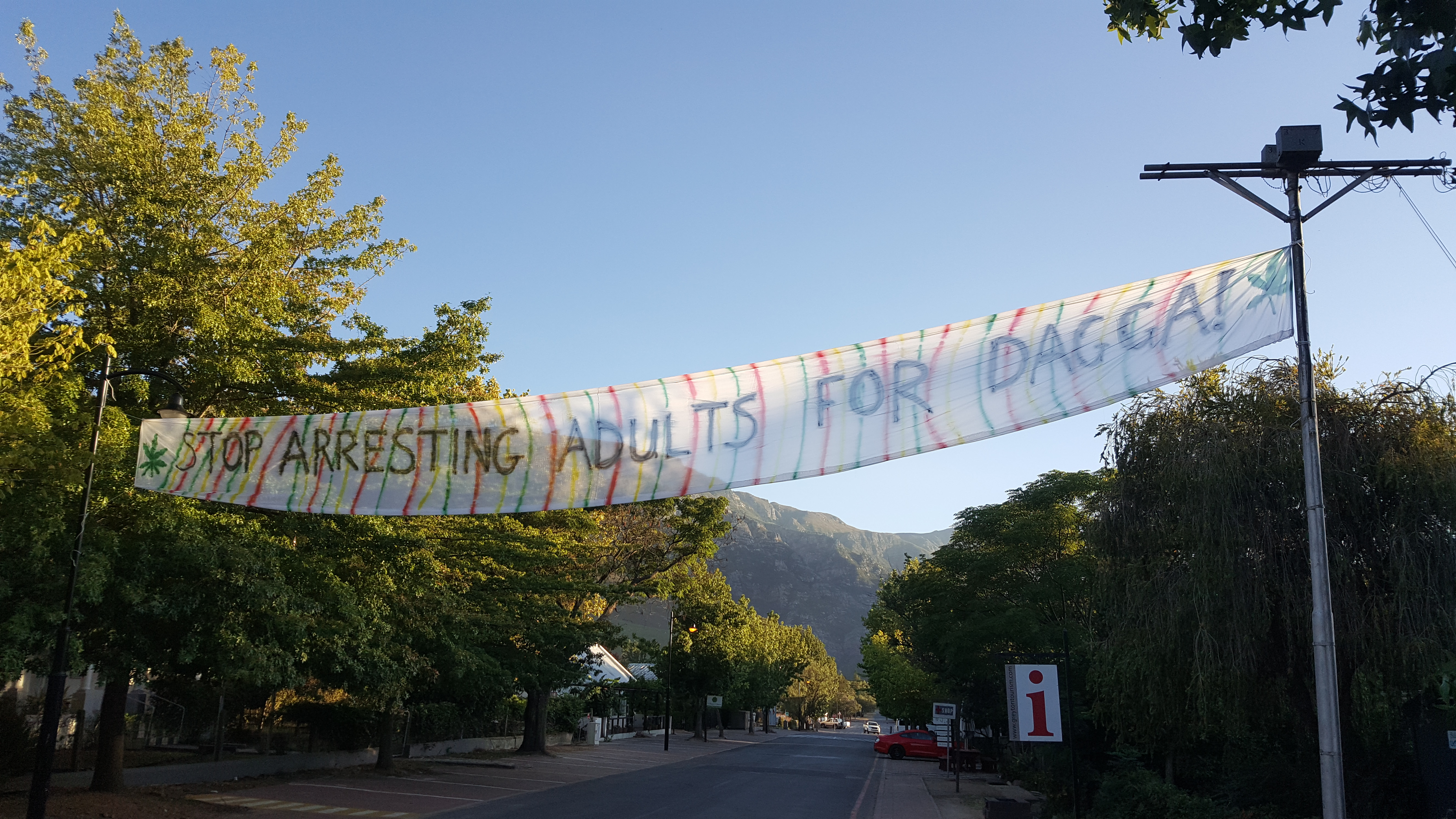
The word dagga on an anti-prohibition banner in 2018

Dagga pronunciation
Sound file of the word being spoken by a South African. The double g's are pronounced much like the Scottish "loch".

Dagga (Afrikaans pronunciation: [ˈdaχa]) is a word used in certain areas of Southern Africa to describe cannabis flower. The term, dating to the 1660s, derives from the word daxa in the Khoekhoe language used to describe the plant as well as various species of Leonotis. The leaves of specifically the Leonotis leonurus resemble the cannabis leaf and is known locally as wild dagga. The word has been spelled many different ways over time as various groups of people began using the term and some examples of these are: daggha, dacha, dacka, dagha, tagga, dachka, daga. According to the Oxford Dictionary, dagga was also used by the Khoekhoe to describe the sensation of intoxication.

== Etymology ==
While it is fairly well known that the first written use of the term was in Jan van Riebeeck’s journal in 1658 and spelled daccha, it was most likely as a reference to the indigenous "wild dagga" that has a similar leaf shape with the jagged edges. The two plants have a very different flower however and some scholars have questioned people's inability to tell them apart.

Another theory put forward by two scholars (Hahn and Lichtenstein) in 1963 proposed that the Dutch word for tobacco, tabak, which was then referred to as twak, was morphed over time into twaga and later to toaga and finally into dagga. Brian du Toit, in his book, Cannabis in Africa (1980) disagreed suggesting the Khoekhoe word daXa-b (tobacco), is the root noun from which the word dagga was derived. Their word for green is !am and when added to daXa-b it resulted in amaXa-b namely green tobacco. This theory is supported by Jean Branford, who in her 1978 book, A Dictionary of South African English, drew similar conclusions.

== 1940s–present ==
In 1948, the National Party came to power; they, like their predecessors, continued the prohibition of the plant. Being an Afrikaans political party and given that the phonetic ‘ga’ already expressed disgust in the language, they embraced the use of the word to extend criticism towards the drug and anyone that used it. This gave dagga a social stigma over time and as such, most pro-cannabis enthusiasts still refuse to use it. This has changed in more recent times as people involved in the anti-prohibition movement such as the Dagga Couple and the Dagga Party "reclaim" the word in an attempt to remind people of its history and meaning.

== See also ==
- Cannabis in South Africa
