= Hump =

Hump, The Hump, or humping may refer to:

== Biological ==
- Hump, an anatomical structure composed of muscle or fat
  - For other examples, see the list of animals with humps
- Humping, slang for sexual intercourse
  - Dry humping, a form of non-penetrative sexual activity
- Hunchback or Kyphosis, curvature of the upper spine

== Media ==
- HUMP! (film festival), an annual presentation of amateur pornography

== Music ==
- Humpin, a 1994 album by The Gap Band
- "My Humps", a 2005 song by The Black Eyed Peas

== People ==
- Nickname of Murray Humphreys, a Chicago prohibition gangster

== Places ==
- The Hump (Alberta), a summit in Alberta
- The Hump, a name given by World War II Allied pilots to part of the Himalayan mountains
- HuMP, Hundred Metre Prominence, a classification of British hills
- The Hump (Antarctica), a summit in Antarctica
- Nickname of the Humphrey Coliseum, Mississippi State University's main indoor arena

== Transport ==
- The hump in a railroad Hump yard, to classify railcars by gravity
- Speed humps, an alternative traffic calming method to Speed bumps
- Harrington Hump, a ramped system to increase the height of part of a railway platform

== See also ==
- List of animals with humps
