= The Hump (Alberta) =

Coordinates: 54°38′42″N 119°26′10″W

The Hump is a summit in Alberta, Canada.

The Hump's name comes from the Cree Indians of the area, who likened the summit to a buffalo's hump.
