= Hemp (surname) =

Hemp is a surname. Notable people with the surname include:

- David Hemp (born 1970), Bermudian cricketer
- Ducky Hemp (1862–1923), American baseball player
- Lauren Hemp (born 2000), English association footballer
- Meinhard Hemp (born 1942), German footballer
- Peyton Hemp (born 2003), American ice hockey player
- Tim Hemp (born 1974), Bermudian cricketer
- Wilfrid James Hemp (1882–1962), British archaeologist and antiquarian
