= Cannabis (disambiguation) =

Cannabis is a genus of flowering plants.

Cannabis may also refer to:

- Cannabis (drug), a psychoactive drug made from the cannabis plant, most often marijuana and hashish
- Medical cannabis, cannabis and cannabinoids prescribed by physicians for their patients
- Cannabis (film), a 1970 crime film
  - Cannabis (film score), by Serge Gainsbourg
- Cannabis (TV series), a 2016 French-language TV series
- Cannabis: The Illegalization of Weed in America, a 2019 nonfiction graphic novel by Box Brown

== See also ==
- Etymology of cannabis
- Glossary of cannabis terms
- List of names for cannabis
  - List of names for cannabis strains
- Hemp, a variety of Cannabis sativa grown specifically for industrial use
- Marijuana (disambiguation)
