= Dagga Couple =

Pro-cannabis organisation

- The Dagga Couple logo
- Motto: "I am not a criminal"
- Founders: Julian Stobbs, Myrtle Clark
- Established: 2010
- Focus: Legalization or decriminalization of cannabis in South Africa
- Location: South Africa
- Website: daggacouple.co.za

The Dagga Couple or DC is a pro-cannabis lobbyist organisation from South Africa founded by Julian Stobbs and Myrtle Clarke after the two were arrested for the possession and dealing in the substance in 2010. Rather than plead guilty, the couple decided instead to sue seven sectors of government that maintained and enforced the policy of cannabis prohibition in the country resulting in what has been described locally as the Trial of the Plant in 2017.

Stobbs was fatally shot during an armed robbery at his home in Sunrella, Gauteng on 3 July 2020. Clarke, who was with him at the time of the incident, escaped unharmed.

== History and arrest ==
Julian Stobbs, a retired Royal Navy air traffic controller and art director in the television and film industry and Kathleen (Myrtle) Clarke, a freelance art director and former school teacher were arrested after police, acting on a tip-off, raided their home in August 2010. Having more than 115 grams of cannabis (South African law dictates that anything above 115 grams is considered dealing), they were charged with possession, the intent to sell and faced a lengthy jail time if convicted. They were granted bail and released.

...we had a very heavy handed visit from the South African Police Service who, acting on a tip off, raided our property in search of a 'drug lab'. What they found was a quiet middle aged couple in their pyjamas and a quantity of dagga. We were arrested after a five-hour ordeal in our kitchen, jailed, and because we had more than 115g of the substance, were charged with dealing in dagga. We were subsequently granted bail and released.

— Clarke on their arrest

However, according to ENCA, "the two have turned their case on its head, challenging the government to legalise marijuana". They are suing seven government departments on the charges that they are upholding unlawful and unconstitutional laws. Cannabis is considered a Schedule 7 drug in South Africa, along with heroin, cocaine and methamphetamine; The Dagga Couple intend to challenge this and many other legal aspects they consider "unjust and irrational, not supported by any empirical evidence and outdated". In line with changing attitudes worldwide, they also believe cannabis does far less damage than alcohol or tobacco and that it can be used for medicinal purposes.

=== Origins of the name ===
The regional term dagga is commonly used for cannabis and is derived from the Khoikhoi word dacha, which was used by the early European colonial settlers in the Western Cape. After their arrest Stobbs and Clarke became known as "The Dagga Couple" in local media.

== Dagga in South Africa ==
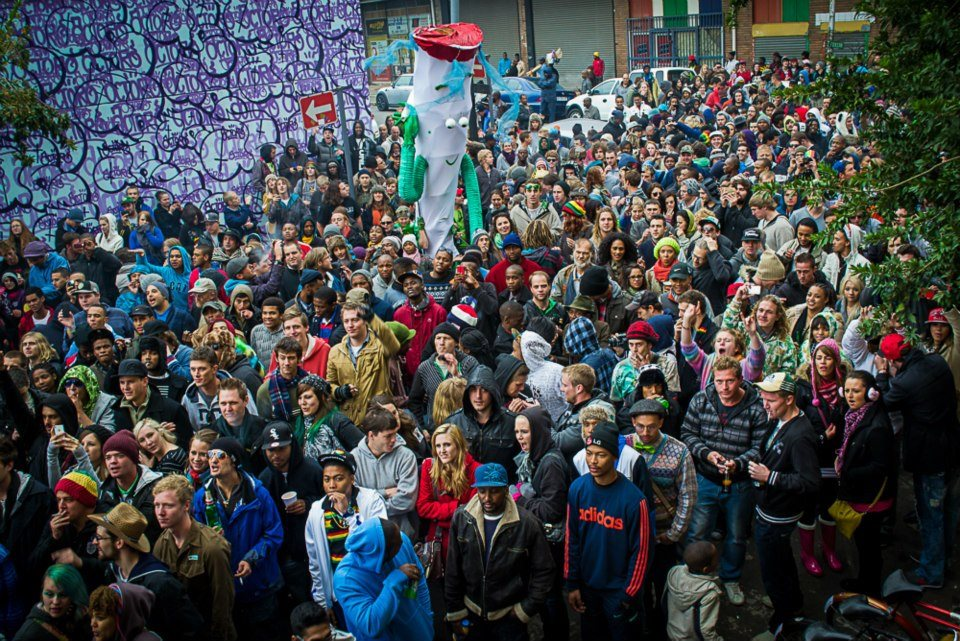
The Dagga Couple's 420 DDAY event in 2013

Cannabis is illegal for recreational and medical use in South Africa though some advocates have been pressurising the government to modify its laws, which first restricted cannabis in 1922, to allow exemptions for medical use, religious practices, and other purposes.

Cannabis is thought to have been introduced to Africa by early Arab or Indian Hindu travelers, which Bantu settlers subsequently introduced to southern Africa when they migrated southward. It was already in popular use in South Africa by the indigenous Khoisan and Bantu peoples prior to European settlement in the Cape in 1652, and was traditionally used by Basotho to ease childbirth. According to author Hazel Crampton, old Afrikaner recipes for teas and foods exist which make use of the plant. Use of the plant was associated with traditional African populations and a lower economic status.

Longitudinal research studies by the Medical Research Council (MRC) report that the number of cannabis users in South Africa was 2.2 million in 2004, and 3.2 million in 2008. In 2003, Interpol rated South Africa as the fourth-largest cannabis producer in the world, and the Institute for Security Studies reported that most cannabis seized in the UK and a third globally had South African origins.

== The Trial of the Plant ==
=== Case timeline ===
Date	Details
August 2010	Raided, arrested and charged with dealing.
August 2010	Appearance at Magistrates court. Applied to be heard in the Constitutional Court based on attached link.
May 2011	Affidavit handed in at the North Gauteng High Court on the same day as their Magistrate's Court hearing.
August 2011	Charges of possession and dealing struck off the roll at Magistrate's Court, pending the outcome of their constitutional challenge.
August 2011	Summons served to seven heads of departments.
November 2011	The defendants file their intention to defend the charges.
January 2012	The state replies to founding affidavit (see link).
July 2012	Doctors For Life apply to the Pretoria high Court to be defendant number 8 for the State in the case.
July 2017	The Trial of the Plant starts in the Pretoria High Court.
August 2017	After nearly 3 weeks of expert testimony the case is postponed to 2018 to allow the plaintiffs time to study the 4000 pages of late evidence introduced by Doctors for Life.

=== Details of legal proceedings ===
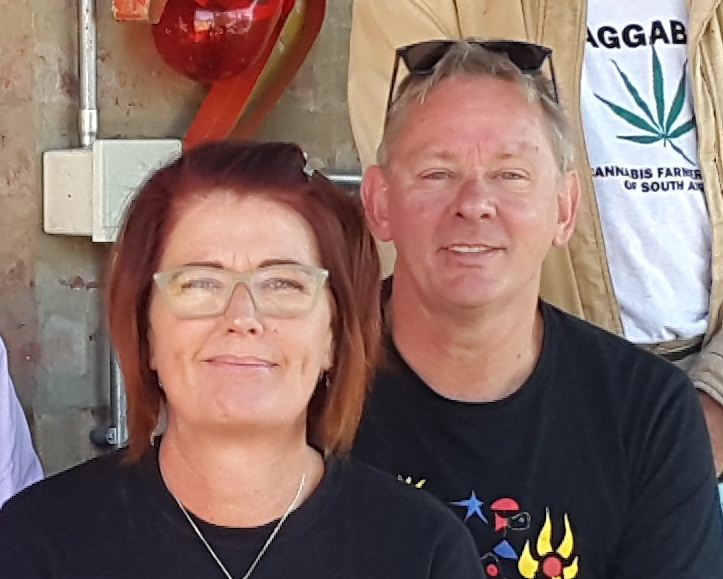
The Dagga Couple's Myrtle Clark and Julian Stobbs in 2015

The Dagga Couple are suing the following heads of government departments:

- The National Director of Public Prosecutions
- The Minister of Justice and Constitutional Development
- The Minister of Health
- The Minister of Social Development
- The Minister of International Relations and Cooperation
- The Minister of Trade and Industry
- The Minister of Police

South Africa is known for having one of the most liberal constitutions in the world and includes such clauses as the right to health and the right to self-medicate. The Dagga Couple are challenging these and other legal issues in their case at the country's highest court, The Constitutional Court. This landmark case will also challenge certain racially based laws pertaining to the plant.

=== Prince/Acton case ===
On 31 March 2017, in a case against the state brought on by Gareth Prince, Jeremy Acton, and Jonathan Ruben in the Western Cape High Court, presiding Judge Dennis Davis ruled that any law disallowing the use and cultivation of cannabis by an adult in a private dwelling was unconstitutional and therefore invalid, on the grounds that such infringement of the constitutional right to privacy could not be justified. The state appealed the decision and the case is set to be heard in the constitutional court in November 2017. The Dagga Couple applied in October of the same year to be enlisted as friends of the court to assist Prince and Acton with Clarke stating "The case brought by Prince and Acton was unique in that the matter is one of significant public interest and importance‚ invoking a consideration of a vast number of constitutional rights whilst‚ at the same time‚ all of the protagonists on one side of the argument are not represented by counsel". On 28 October 2017 this application was granted by the constitutional court of South Africa.

== Fields of Green for All ==
Registered in February 2014 and officially launched by the Dagga Couple in December 2014, Fields of Green for All is South Africa's first cannabis-based non-profit organisation aimed at assisting citizens arrested on any cannabis-related offense. By joining, anyone arrested for any cannabis related charge in South Africa will receive all the legal assistance necessary to obtain a stay of prosecution. The idea being that instead of pleading guilty and accepting a criminal record, incarceration or a suspended sentence and a fine, people are taking a stand and declaring themselves not to be criminals.

=== International actions ===
The Dagga Couple attended the United Nations Commission on Narcotic Drugs, in Vienna, Austria, on several occasions since December 2018, and took part in inter-governmental discussions (such as the High Level Ministerial Segment of the Commission on Narcotic Drugs in March 2019), policy conferences such as the International Cannabis Policy Conference in 2018, and met with representatives of the United Nations Office on Drugs and Crime and the International Narcotics Control Board.

Since May 2021, the non-profit Fields of Green for All has been granted special consultative status with the United Nations Economic and Social Council (ECOSOC), the highest status granted by the UN to NGOs. In December 2021, Fields of Green for All took part in, and submitted a statement on behalf of, an action organized by 181 non-governmental organizations addressed to Secretary-General and the INCB. Fields of Green collaborates with NGOs such as ENCOD, FAAAT, International Center for Ethnobotanical Education, Research and Service, or entities like the Berkeley Patients Group.

=== Dagga Private Clubs ===
In April 2019 Fields of Green for ALL launched the Dagga Private Clubs movement, as a local adaptation of Cannabis Social Clubs the non-profit small-scale cannabis dispensation system created in Europe.

== See also ==
- Cannabis in South Africa
- Dagga Party
- Legalisation of cannabis / Legalization of illegal drugs
- Traditional medicine
- Drug policy
