= Marijuana (disambiguation) =

Marijuana is a psychoactive drug from the cannabis. The plant itself is known by the name "marijuana".

Marijuana or Marihuana may also refer to:

- Marijuana (word)

== Film ==
- Marihuana (1936 film), an American exploitation film
- Marihuana (El monstruo verde), a 1936 Mexican film
- Marihuana (1950 film), or The Marihuana Story, an Argentine film
- Marijuana (1968 film), an anti-drug documentary
- Marijuana (2020 film), an Indian Tamil-language film

== Other uses ==
- Marihuana (novel), by Cornell Woolrich, 1941
- Marijuana (EP), by Brujeria, 2000
- "Marijuana" (song), a song by Kid Cudi from Man on the Moon II: The Legend of Mr. Rager, 2010
- "Marijuana", a song by Adéla from Prima, 2026
- Marijuana Pepsi Vandyck (born 1972), American educator

== See also ==
- Cannabis (disambiguation)
- List of names for cannabis
