= Joe Galkin =

American record producer

Joe Galkin was a Russian-born American record producer and musician, best known for his producing at Atlantic Records and his own Gerald Record label and work with Otis Redding and Phil Walden. Galkin saw the potential of Redding's "Love Twist" and purchased the masters to the song and had Atlantic release it and who persuaded Jim Stewart to permit Redding to record two songs, "These Arms of Mine" and "Hey, Hey Baby".

Galkin had migrated with his parents and siblings to Macon, Georgia, and began performing with local groups and began booking them before working for Stax Records and Atlantic Records. He was described as "a mainstay in Atlantic's southern promotion term."
