= International Hemp Building Association =

Organization of hemp manufacturers

The International Hemp Building Association (IHBA) is the largest association internationally in this sector. Members and partners of the association include architects, builders, consultants, designers, the European Industrial Hemp Association (EIHA), the Hemp Industries Association and manufacturers.

== History ==
A non-profit association founded in 2009 by director Steve Allin author and hemp building consultant, the association globally promotes and supports the production and use of all hemp based construction materials and their by-products in a sustainable and bio-regional manner.

In April 2011 professionals in the hemp building industry from around the globe were interviewed for the documentary Bringing It Home at the association's 2nd International Hemp Building Symposium, in Granada, Spain. The IHBA cooperated with the technology department of engineering sciences of Uppsala University in Sweden in 2014 on research into a study on the potential of hemp buildings in different climates.
