= Hamp Swain =

Hamp Swain, Jr. (December 3, 1929 – May 9, 2018), nicknamed "King Bee" after the Slim Harpo song "I'm a King Bee," was an American radio disc jockey, popular on WIBB AM 1280 in Macon, Georgia, starting in 1957. In 1954, he became the city's first black DJ when he began working for WBML AM 1350.

Born in Macon, he attended college for a short time before working as an insurance agent for Atlanta Life, and playing saxophone in his own band, the Hamptones, which occasionally featured high school friend Little Richard on vocals. The Hamptones performed at the Cavalcade of Jazz concert held in Los Angeles at Wrigley Field on July 10, 1949 and in San Diego's Lane Field on September 3, 1949, which were both produced by Leon Hefflin, Sr. Swain helped give James Brown his big break by being the first DJ to play "Please, Please, Please" on the radio in 1956. He also hosted "The Teenage Party," a talent competition won by local singer Otis Redding several times. Swain started his own record label in Macon in the late 1960s, Jar-Val, named after two of his children, Jarvis and Valencia.

Swain was inducted into the Georgia Music Hall of Fame on September 13, 2008. He died of natural causes on May 9, 2018, in Macon, at the age of 88.
