= National Recording Corporation =

American record label

National Recording Corporation was an American record label, established in Atlanta in 1958.

== Background ==
The company was created by disc jockey Bill Lowery. The premises were at the old Brookhaven School building.

The company recorded and pressed albums. A part of the business was shut down in 1961, but founder Lowery kept a recording studio for the company.

Artists to have recorded with the company include Joe South and Jerry Reed.

== History ==
Bill Lowery who was a producer and a group of businessmen founded the company in 1958. The first release was "The Rock-A-Round" b/w "Sweet Skinny Jenny" which was released on NRC 001. It was actually recorded at WGST. Sales from the record enabled them to set up their own studio and pressing facilities.

== Later years ==
In later years, the company was known as Southern Tracks.

== See also ==
- List of record labels
- National Recording Corporation artists
