= Bill Lowery (music producer) =

American music entrepreneur (1924–2004)

Bill Lowery (October 21, 1924 – June 8, 2004) was an American music entrepreneur and record producer.

== Early successes ==
Lowery was born in Leesville, Louisiana. He studied radio dramatics at Taft Junior College and went on to a number of radio-announcing jobs. At age 21, he was hired to direct the construction and programming of WBEJ, a radio station in Elizabethton, Tennessee.

In the early 1950s, Lowery was the top country music disc jockey in America and also was a pioneer TV host on Atlanta television. A 1951 diagnosis of cancer (which he ultimately survived) left Lowery wondering how to provide for his family, and he decided to go into the music publishing business. Although the music industry told Lowery that no music company could be based anywhere but New York, Chicago, Nashville, or Los Angeles, he believed that Atlanta could be a true music city. Together with an associate, Dennis "Boots" Woodall, Lowery formed Lowery Music Company and was involved in independent record production and promotion. Early hit songs published by Lowery Music included a string of country music hits for major labels, but two of the most notable Lowery Music songs were early rockabilly hits: "Be Bop A Lula" by Gene Vincent & His Blue Caps, and "Young Love", recorded by both Sonny James and movie actor Tab Hunter. Lowery is credited with being involved in the earliest recordings of Ray Stevens and Jerry Reed for Capitol Records.

== National Recording Corporation ==
In 1958, Lowery formed National Recording Corporation in Atlanta. To raise capital, sales of "founders' contracts" were made by a group headed by Ray Griggers. NRC initially recorded at WGST Radio studios until stock sales allowed NRC to set up its record pressing plant, record distributorship, and recording studio, with Ray Stevens, Joe South, and Jerry Reed as the staff band. Despite early hit records such as "Robbin' The Cradle" by Tony Bellus, as well as manufacturing and distribution of other labels, NRC was forced into bankruptcy in April 1961. Lowery called NRC "his only failure".

== Later years ==
Lowery died in Atlanta, Georgia, on June 8, 2004, after a four-month battle with cancer.
