= Dagga Party =

South African political party advocating cannabis legalization

- isiXhosa name: Iqela Lentsango
- Leader: Jeremy Acton
- Founded: February 2009
- Ideology: Cannabis legalisation

Website
- daggaparty.org.za

Dagga Party, formally known as Iqela Lentsango: The Dagga Party of South Africa, is a South African political party founded in 2009 by Jeremy Acton, who remains the party's leader. "Dagga" is a South African colloquial term for cannabis, the legalisation of which forms the core of the party's platform. The Dagga Party was established to allow voters who support the legalisation of dagga to have representation in elections.

The party failed to register with the Independent Electoral Commission in order to contest the 2014 and the 2019 South African general election because it could not raise the required R200,000 registration fee. However, the party entered into an alliance with African Democratic Change for 2019.

The party's position is that cannabis users should have the same rights as people who use tobacco and alcohol.

Some members of the party were responsible for bringing the case before a South African court which resulted in the partial decriminalisation of dagga in South Africa in 2018.
