= Woodstock 40 Years On: Back to Yasgur's Farm =

Live album by Various artists
- Released: August 11, 2009
- Recorded: August 15, 16, & 17, 1969
- Venues: Woodstock Festival, Bethel, NY
- Genre: Rock
- Label: Rhino Records
- Producers: Andy Zax, Mason Williams and Cheryl Pawelski

Woodstock albums chronology
The Woodstock Experience (2009)	Woodstock 40 Years On: Back to Yasgur's Farm (2009)	Woodstock – Back to the Garden: 50th Anniversary Collection (2019)

Woodstock 40 Years On: Back to Yasgur's Farm is a six-CD live box-set album of the 1969 Woodstock Festival in Bethel, New York. Its release marked the 40th Anniversary of the festival.

== Overview ==
At the time of release, Woodstock 40 Years On was the most complete collection ever released of the festival, until the 50th Anniversary box set in 2019. All the artists who performed at Woodstock are featured on the album, except for Ten Years After, The Band, and the Keef Hartley Band.

After reviewing all the multi-track tapes from Woodstock, co-producer Andy Zax selected the best songs from each of the performances, plus stage announcements, set banter, the sounds of rain, and Max Yasgur's address to the crowd.

Over the years, many of the Woodstock albums have featured "doctored" recordings in which mistakes, feedback, and bad miking were either edited or re-recorded. This set features the recordings as close to the original versions as possible in order to simulate actually being at the festival. Also for the first time, the complete and accurate set lists are included in the booklet.

== Track listing ==
Note: Stage announcements and other ambient sound recordings are indicated with italics.

=== Disc one ===
1. Richie Havens – "Handsome Johnny"
2. Richie Havens – "Freedom"
3. John Morris – Choppity choppity
4. Sweetwater – "Look Out"
5. Sweetwater – "Two Worlds" *
6. Bert Sommer – "Jennifer" *
7. Bert Sommer – "And When It's Over" *
8. Bert Sommer – "Smile" *
9. John Morris – There goes Marilyn
10. Tim Hardin – "Hang On to a Dream" *
11. Tim Hardin – "Simple Song of Freedom" *
12. John Morris – Flat blue acid
13. Ravi Shankar – "Raga Puriya-Dhanashri / Gat In Sawarital" *
14. Melanie – "Momma Momma" *
15. Melanie – "Beautiful People"
16. Melanie – "Birthday of the Sun"
17. Arlo Guthrie – "Coming into Los Angeles" ***
18. Arlo Guthrie – "Wheel of Fortune" *
19. Arlo Guthrie – "Every Hand in the Land" *
20. John Morris – All you funny people

=== Disc two ===
1. Joan Baez – "Joe Hill"
2. Joan Baez – "Sweet Sir Galahad"
3. Joan Baez – "Hickory Wind" *
4. Joan Baez featuring Jeffrey Shurtleff – "Drug Store Truck Drivin' Man"
5. John Morris – Bring Scully his asthma pills
6. John Morris – Insulin & Quill intro
7. Quill – "They Live the Life" *
8. Quill – "That's How I Eat" *
9. Chip Monck – I understand your wife is having a baby
10. Country Joe McDonald – "Donovan's Reef" *
11. Country Joe McDonald – "The "Fish" Cheer / I-Feel-Like-I'm-Fixin'-to-Die Rag"
12. Santana – "Persuasion"
13. Santana – "Soul Sacrifice"
14. John Sebastian – "How Have You Been"
15. John Sebastian – "Rainbows All Over Your Blues"
16. John Sebastian – "I Had a Dream"
17. The Incredible String Band – "The Letter" *
18. The Incredible String Band – "When You Find Out Who You Are" *
19. Chip Monck – She is lost

=== Disc three ===
1. Chip Monck – We're in pretty good shape
2. Canned Heat – "Going Up the Country"
3. Canned Heat – "Woodstock Boogie" **
4. Chip Monck – "The brown acid is not specifically too good
5. Mountain – "Blood of the Sun" ***
6. Mountain – "Theme for an Imaginary Western" ***
7. Mountain – "For Yasgur's Farm" *
8. Chip Monck – For those of you who have partaken of the green acid...
9. Jerry Garcia & Country Joe McDonald – Green acid advice
10. Grateful Dead – "Dark Star" *
11. Creedence Clearwater Revival – "Green River"
12. Creedence Clearwater Revival – "Bad Moon Rising" *
13. Creedence Clearwater Revival – "I Put a Spell on You"

=== Disc four ===
1. Janis Joplin – "Work Me, Lord"
2. Janis Joplin – "Ball and Chain"
3. Sly and the Family Stone – Medley: "Dance to the Music" / "Music Lover" / "I Want To Take You Higher"
4. Abbie Hoffman – The politics of the situation
5. The Who – "Amazing Journey" *
6. The Who – "Pinball Wizard" *
7. Abbie Hoffman vs. Pete Townshend
8. The Who – "We're Not Gonna Take It" **
9. Jefferson Airplane – "The Other Side of This Life" *
10. Jefferson Airplane – "Somebody to Love"
11. Jefferson Airplane – "Won't You Try / Saturday Afternoon"
12. Grace Slick – We got a whole lot of orange
13. Jefferson Airplane – "Volunteers"
14. Wavy Gravy – Breakfast in bed for 400,000
15. John Morris – It just keeps goin'
16. Max Yasgur speaks

=== Disc five ===
1. Joe Cocker – "Feelin' Alright" *
2. Joe Cocker – "Let's Go Get Stoned"
3. Joe Cocker – "With a Little Help from My Friends"
4. The rainstorm
5. Country Joe and the Fish – "Rock & Soul Music"
6. Country Joe and the Fish – "Love" *
7. Country Joe and the Fish – "Not So Sweet Martha Lorraine" *
8. Country Joe and the Fish – "Summer Dresses" *
9. Country Joe and the Fish – "Silver and Gold" *
10. Country Joe and the Fish – "Rock & Soul Music (reprise)" *
11. Johnny Winter – "Leland Mississippi Blues" *
12. Johnny Winter – "Mean Town Blues"
13. Blood, Sweat & Tears – "You've Made Me So Very Happy" *

=== Disc six ===
1. Crosby, Stills & Nash – "Suite: Judy Blue Eyes"
2. Crosby, Stills & Nash – "Guinnevere"
3. Crosby, Stills & Nash – "Marrakesh Express"
4. Crosby, Stills & Nash – "4 + 20"
5. Crosby, Stills, Nash & Young – "Sea of Madness" ****
6. Crosby, Stills, Nash & Young – "Wooden Ships" ****
7. The Butterfield Blues Band – "No Amount of Loving" *
8. The Butterfield Blues Band – "Love March"
9. The Butterfield Blues Band – "Everything's Gonna Be Alright"
10. Sha Na Na – "Get a Job" *
11. Sha Na Na – "At the Hop"
12. Sha Na Na – "Get a Job (reprise)" *
13. Jimi Hendrix – "The Star-Spangled Banner" / "Purple Haze" / "Woodstock Improvisation"
14. Chip Monck – Woodstock farewell

=== Bonus disc ===
1. Arlo Guthrie – "Amazing Grace" *
2. The Butterfield Blues Band – "Morning Sunrise" *
3. Sweetwater – "Why Oh Why" *
4. Quill – "Waiting for You" *

[*] Previously unreleased song
[**] Previously unreleased full-length version
[***] Previously unreleased Woodstock recording
[****] "Sea of Madness" and "Wooden Ships" are not the Woodstock versions. This has finally been restored on Woodstock: Back to the Garden.
