= Woodstock – Back to the Garden: 50th Anniversary Experience =

Live album by various artists
- Released: June 28, 2019
- Recorded: August 15–18, 1969
- Venue: Woodstock festival
- Genre: Rock
- Length: 12:41:04
- Label: Rhino
- Producers: Andy Zax; Steve Woolard; Brian Kehew

Woodstock albums chronology
Woodstock – Back to the Garden: 50th Anniversary Collection (2019)	Woodstock – Back to the Garden: 50th Anniversary Experience (2019)	Woodstock – Back to the Garden: The Definitive 50th Anniversary Archive (2019)

Professional ratings
Review scores
Source	Rating
AllMusic	4.5/5 stars
All About Jazz	4.5/5 stars
Record Collector	3/5 stars
The Second Disc	(not rated)

Woodstock – Back to the Garden: 50th Anniversary Experience is a live album by various artists, packaged as a box set of ten compact discs. Released by Rhino Records during the summer leading up to the fiftieth anniversary of the Woodstock Music and Art Fair, it contains selections from every performance at the music festival, which took place on August 15–18, 1969, in Bethel, New York. The discs also include stage announcements and miscellaneous audio material. The package contains essays by producer Andy Zax and Jesse Jarnow, details about the performers and notable festival figures, and photographs. This box set is a compilation derived from its limited edition parent box set. A smaller three-CD or five-LP sampler was also released.

== Background ==
Although expanded issue sets from the festival had appeared for the 25th anniversary in 1994 and the 40th anniversary in 2009, this set proved more ambitious both in method and scope. Producer and archivist Zax spent more than a decade putting it together from hundreds of tapes that had never been consolidated in one place. In the process of reconstructing the festival for these sets, Zax corrected for some flaws in how the music was issued earlier. To wit:

These recordings have suffered a lot of indignities over the years: bad mixes, poor mastering, vocal and instrumental overdubs, rerecordings, sweetenings, deceptive edits, fake applause, fake cricket noises, fake rain chants, fake audience members yelling along with 'The Fish Cheer,' and entirely fraudulent tracks recorded at [other locations]...

Zax, along with mix engineer Brian Kehew and mastering engineer Dave Schultz, referred to photographic documentation which allowed them to situate the performers within the mix based on where they were standing onstage. Although efforts were undertaken to limit any interference in the original sound of the tapes, Zax and the production team were able to turn the surviving mono recording by Ravi Shankar into a true stereo mix.

== Content ==
Unlike previous collations on record of music from the Woodstock Festival and like its parent box, 50th Anniversary Experience presents music from every performer and in the correct order chronologically they appeared over the course of the festival's three days. Discs one and two include all eight of the mostly folk artists who performed on the first day, starting Friday, August 15. The 14 performers from the second day, starting in the afternoon of Saturday, August 16, commence with the final performers on disc two Quill and end with the first performers on disc seven, Jefferson Airplane. The ten performers on the third and final day starting in the afternoon of Sunday, August 17, continue on the rest of disc seven through disc ten. One artist, Country Joe McDonald, appears twice having played a solo set on day two and another set with his band on day three.

Of the 162 tracks on the set, 117 are musical performances. Interspersed among the musical numbers are stage announcements comprising the remaining 45 tracks, mostly by the festival's unofficial mc's Chip Monck and John Morris. Farmer Max Yasgur, upon whose farm the festival took place, addresses the assembled crowd on day three. Also included is the 'confrontation' between Who guitarist Pete Townshend and activist Abbie Hoffman, the latter interrupting the Who's set to pontificate upon the prison sentence of White Panther John Sinclair. The edit for the performance of "The Star-Spangled Banner" into "Purple Haze" by Jimi Hendrix seems to duplicate that found on the original soundtrack album. Although not appearing at the festival, the presence of counterculture icons Bob Dylan and The Beatles is felt via songs covered in this box set — five artists sing Dylan songs, and three sing the Beatles.

== Track listing ==
=== Disc one – Richie Havens, Sweetwater, Bert Sommer, Tim Hardin ===
No.	Title	Writer(s)	Performer/Announcer	Length
1.	"Hello"		Richie Havens	1:16
2.	"From the Prison/Get Together/From the Prison"	Jerry Merrick/Chet Powers	Richie Havens	4:32
3.	"High Flying Bird"	Billy Edd Wheeler	Richie Havens	4:24
4.	"With a Little Help from My Friends"	John Lennon, Paul McCartney	Richie Havens	3:30
5.	"Handsome Johnny"	Lou Gossett, Richie Havens	Richie Havens	4:49
6.	"Freedom"	adapted by Richie Havens	Richie Havens	5:14
7.	"It seems there are a few cars blocking the road"		John Morris	0:40
8.	"Look Out"	Nansi Nevins	Sweetwater	4:04
9.	"Day Song"	Nansi Nevins	Sweetwater	1:53
10.	"Two Worlds"	Nansi Nevins	Sweetwater	6:14
11.	"Jennifer"	Bert Sommer	Bert Sommer	3:05
12.	"And When It's Over"	Bert Sommer	Bert Sommer	3:07
13.	"America"	Paul Simon	Bert Sommer	3:30
14.	"Smile"	Bert Sommer	Bert Sommer	4:15
15.	"Let's see how bright it can be"		John Morris	2:55
16.	"How Can We Hang On to a Dream"	Tim Hardin	Tim Hardin	4:06
17.	"If I Were a Carpenter"	Tim Hardin	Tim Hardin	5:19
18.	"Reason to Believe"	Tim Hardin	Tim Hardin	4:27
19.	"Misty Roses"	Tim Hardin	Tim Hardin	4:34
20.	"We're a pretty big city right now"		John Morris	3:59

=== Disc two – Ravi Shankar, Melanie, Arlo Guthrie, Joan Baez, Quill ===
No.	Title	Writer(s)	Performer/Announcer	Length
1.	"Somebody, somewhere, is giving out some flat blue acid"		John Morris	0:51
2.	"Raga Manj Khamaj"	adapted by Ravi Shankar	Ravi Shankar	17:48
3.	"Momma Momma"	Melanie Safka	Melanie	3:45
4.	"Beautiful People"	Melanie Safka	Melanie	4:01
5.	"Mr. Tambourine Man"	Bob Dylan	Melanie	2:24
6.	"Birthday of the Sun"	Melanie Safka	Melanie	3:37
7.	"It's a free concert from now on"		John Morris	1:32
8.	"Coming into Los Angeles"	Arlo Guthrie	Arlo Guthrie	3:26
9.	"Lotta freaks"		Arlo Guthrie	0:36
10.	"Wheel of Fortune"	Arlo Guthrie	Arlo Guthrie	2:30
11.	"Walkin' Down the Line"	Bob Dylan	Arlo Guthrie	4:27
12.	"Every Hand in the Land"	Arlo Guthrie	Arlo Guthrie	1:48
13.	"Let's just make the festival, not the other stuff"		John Morris	0:45
14.	"The Last Thing on My Mind"	Tom Paxton	Joan Baez	3:52
15.	"I Shall Be Released"	Bob Dylan	Joan Baez	3:47
16.	"He already had a very, very good hunger strike going"		Joan Baez	3:00
17.	"Joe Hill"	Earl Robinson, Alfred Hayes	Joan Baez	2:46
18.	"Drug Store Truck Drivin' Man"	Roger McGuinn, Gram Parsons	Joan Baez with Jeffrey Shurtlieff	2:47
19.	"That brings us fairly close to the dawn"		John Morris	0:54
20.	"I guess the reason we're here is music"		John Morris	0:38
21.	"They Live the Life"	Dan Cole, Jon Cole	Quill	8:19
22.	"That's How I Eat"	Dan Cole	Quill	5:31

=== Disc three – Country Joe McDonald, Santana, John Sebastian, Keef Hartley Band ===
No.	Title	Writer(s)	Performer/Announcer	Length
1.	"Can those of you in the back hear well?"		Chip Monck	1:47
2.	"Janis"	Joe McDonald	Country Joe McDonald	2:50
3.	"Donovan's Reef"	Joe McDonald	Country Joe McDonald	4:05
4.	"The "Fish" Cheer/I-Feel-Like-I'm-Fixin'-to-Die Rag"	Joe McDonald	Country Joe McDonald	5:08
5.	"Those wishing to be lost, those wishing to be found"		Chip Monck	0:29
6.	"Savor"	Santana	Santana	5:24
7.	"Jingo"	Babatunde Olatunji	Santana	5:17
8.	"Persuasion"	Santana	Santana	3:53
9.	"Soul Sacrifice"	Carlos Santana, Gregg Rolie, David Brown, Marcus Malone	Santana	11:55
10.	"An exciting set is understandable"		Chip Monck	0:14
11.	"How Have You Been"	John Sebastian	John Sebastian	6:01
12.	"Rainbows All Over Your Blues"	John Sebastian	John Sebastian	3:43
13.	"I Had a Dream"	John Sebastian	John Sebastian	3:37
14.	"Darlin' Be Home Soon"	John Sebastian	John Sebastian	4:27
15.	"Halfbreed Medley: Sinnin' for You/Leaving Trunk/Just to Cry/Sinnin' for You"	K. Hartley, Fred Finnegan, Peter Dines, Alex Hewitson, Henry Lowther, John Estes	Keef Hartley Band	17:57
16.	"Bring Jerry's nitroglycerin pills to the Indian Pavilion"		Chip Monck	1:58

=== Disc four – The Incredible String Band, Canned Heat ===
No.	Title	Writer(s)	Performer/Announcer	Length
1.	"Go to Mr. Lang's office right away"		Chip Monck	1:15
2.	"Invocation"	Robin Williamson	The Incredible String Band	1:42
3.	"The Letter"	Mike Heron	The Incredible String Band	5:33
4.	"Gather 'Round"	Robin Williamson	The Incredible String Band	5:06
5.	"When You Find Out Who You Are"	Robin Williamson	The Incredible String Band	9:26
6.	"If things aren't going well for you or whatever"		Chip Monck and Hugh Romney	2:46
7.	"Going Up the Country"	Alan Wilson	Canned Heat	4:46
8.	"Woodstock Boogie"	Robert Hite, Jr.	Canned Heat	29:02
9.	"Can we have a little juice on this other microphone, please?"		Bob Hite and Chip Monck	1:27
10.	"On the Road Again"	Floyd Jones, Alan Wilson	Canned Heat	10:53
11.	"It's your own trip"		Chip Monck	2:05

=== Disc five – Mountain, Grateful Dead, Creedence Clearwater Revival ===
No.	Title	Writer(s)	Performer/Announcer	Length
1.	"We'll take care of that right away"		Chip Monck	2:30
2.	"Theme from an Imaginary Western"	Pete Brown, Jack Bruce	Mountain	5:04
3.	"Long Red"	Leslie West, Felix Pappalardi, John Ventura, Norman Landsberg	Mountain	5:45
4.	"What Am I but You and the Sun (for Yasgur's Farm)"	Gail Collins, Felix Pappalardi, George Gardos, Corky Laing, David Rea, Gary Ship	Mountain	3:55
5.	"Southbound Train"	Leslie West, John Ventura, Norman Landsberg	Mountain	6:17
6.	"Open your eyes wide"		Chip Monck and Joshua White	2:29
7.	"So many people have been able to participate in such a debacle"		Ken Babbs	1:29
8.	"Mama Tried"	Merle Haggard	Grateful Dead	2:40
9.	"It's a sinister plot!"		Ken Babbs, Country Joe McDonald, et al.	4:10
10.	"Dark Star"	Robert Hunter, Jerry Garcia	Grateful Dead	19:18
11.	"High Time"	Robert Hunter, Jerry Garcia	Grateful Dead	6:17
12.	"You're carrying Janis' wah-wah pedals"		John Morris	1:54
13.	"Green River"	John Fogerty	Creedence Clearwater Revival	3:17
14.	"Bad Moon Rising"	John Fogerty	Creedence Clearwater Revival	2:14
15.	"I Put a Spell on You"	Jalacy Hawkins, Herb Slotkin	Creedence Clearwater Revival	4:24
16.	"It's going to be a very long evening"		Chip Monck	1:04

=== Disc six – Janis Joplin, Sly and the Family Stone, The Who ===
No.	Title	Writer(s)	Performer/Announcer	Length
1.	"To Love Somebody"	Barry Gibb, Robin Gibb	Janis Joplin	5:19
2.	"Kozmic Blues"	Janis Joplin, Gabriel Mekler	Janis Joplin	4:54
3.	"Piece of My Heart"	Jerry Ragovoy, Bert Berns	Janis Joplin	3:56
4.	"Music's for grooving, man"		Janis Joplin	1:34
5.	"Ball and Chain"	Willie Mae Thornton	Janis Joplin	6:27
6.	"Just in case you should get any ideas about leaving"		Chip Monck	0:41
7.	"Medley: Everyday People/Dance to the Music/Music Lover/I Want to Take You Higher"	Sylvester Stewart	Sly and the Family Stone	22:31
8.	"Are you supposed to be up there rapping? No, man"		Abbie Hoffman and stagehand	0:35
9.	"I Can't Explain"	Pete Townshend	The Who	2:24
10.	"Pinball Wizard"	Pete Townshend	The Who	2:55
11.	"I can dig it"		Abbie Hoffman, Pete Townshend	0:30
12.	"We're Not Gonna Take It"	Pete Townshend	The Who	8:59
13.	"Shakin' All Over"	Frederick Heath	The Who	4:44
14.	"My Generation"	Pete Townshend	The Who	7:12
15.	"Welcome this new day"		Chip Monck	0:54

=== Disc seven – Jefferson Airplane, Joe Cocker ===
No.	Title	Writer(s)	Performer/Announcer	Length
1.	"The Other Side of This Life"	Fred Neil	Jefferson Airplane	8:28
2.	"Somebody to Love"	Darby Slick	Jefferson Airplane	4:25
3.	"Let's play it out of tune"		Grace Slick	0:12
4.	"3/5 of a Mile in 10 Seconds"	Marty Balin	Jefferson Airplane	5:29
5.	"Won't You Try/Saturday Afternoon"	Paul Kantner	Jefferson Airplane	5:11
6.	"We got a whole lot of orange, and it was fine"		Grace Slick	0:31
7.	"Plastic Fantastic Lover"	Marty Balin	Jefferson Airplane	4:30
8.	"Volunteers"	Marty Balin, Paul Kantner	Jefferson Airplane	3:02
9.	"If you're too tired to chew, pass it on"		Hugh Romney	2:20
10.	"The roads are fairly clear now"		John Morris	1:08
11.	"This is the largest group of people ever assembled in one place"		Max Yasgur	2:35
12.	"Dear Landlord"	Bob Dylan	Joe Cocker	8:08
13.	"Feelin' Alright?"	Dave Mason	Joe Cocker	6:02
14.	"Let's Go Get Stoned"	Josephine Armstead, Nicholas Ashford, Valerie Simpson	Joe Cocker	6:54
15.	"Hitchcock Railway"	Don Dunn, Tony McCashen	Joe Cocker	6:04
16.	"With a Little Help from My Friends"	John Lennon, Paul McCartney	Joe Cocker	8:19
17.	"Isn't the rain beautiful?"		John Morris, Barry Melton, rainstorm & audience	5:36

=== Disc eight – Country Joe and the Fish, Ten Years After, The Band ===
No.	Title	Writer(s)	Performer/Announcer	Length
1.	"Rock and Soul Music"	Joe McDonald, Barry Melton, Bruce Barthol, David Cohen, Gary Hirsh	Country Joe and the Fish	2:12
2.	"Love"	J. McDonald, B. Melton, Bruce Barthol, David Cohen, Gary Hirsh, John Gunning	Country Joe and the Fish	3:03
3.	"Silver and Gold"	Joe McDonald	Country Joe and the Fish	4:48
4.	"Rock and Soul Music (reprise)"	Joe McDonald, Barry Melton, Bruce Barthol, David Cohen, Gary Hirsh	Country Joe and the Fish	12:27
5.	"Help Me"	Rice Miller, Willie Dixon, Ralph Bass	Ten Years After	15:37
6.	"I'm Going Home"	Alvin Lee	Ten Years After	12:20
7.	"Come down and say hello to us"		Chip Monck	1:33
8.	"Chest Fever"	Robbie Robertson	The Band	5:36
9.	"Tears of Rage"	Bob Dylan, Richard Manuel	The Band	5:36
10.	"This Wheel's on Fire"	Bob Dylan, Rick Danko	The Band	3:57
11.	"I Shall Be Released"	Bob Dylan	The Band	3:39
12.	"The Weight"	Robbie Robertson	The Band	4:38
13.	"We've just had a slight change in running order"		Chip Monck	0:30

=== Disc nine – Johnny Winter, Blood Sweat & Tears, Crosby Stills Nash & Young ===
No.	Title	Writer(s)	Performer/Announcer	Length
1.	"It's really a drag"		Chip Monck	0:55
2.	"Leland Mississippi Blues"	Johnny Winter	Johnny Winter	5:13
3.	"Mean Town Blues"	Johnny Winter	Johnny Winter	10:57
4.	"Johnny B. Goode"	Chuck Berry	Johnny Winter	5:26
5.	"It just doesn't seem to be necessary"		Chip Monck	1:03
6.	"More and More"	Don Juan, Vee Pea Smith	Blood, Sweat & Tears	2:57
7.	"Spinning Wheel"	David Clayton-Thomas	Blood, Sweat & Tears	4:49
8.	"Smiling Phases"	Steve Winwood, Jim Capaldi, Chris Wood	Blood, Sweat & Tears	10:08
9.	"You've Made Me So Very Happy"	Brenda Holloway, Patrice Holloway, Frank Wilson, Berry Gordy, Jr.	Blood, Sweat & Tears	4:54
10.	"Tell 'em who we are, man"		David Crosby, Stephen Stills	1:00
11.	"Suite: Judy Blue Eyes"	Stephen Stills	Crosby, Stills & Nash	8:38
12.	"Blackbird"	John Lennon, Paul McCartney	Crosby, Stills & Nash	2:45
13.	"Marrakesh Express"	Graham Nash	Crosby, Stills & Nash	2:54
14.	"Sea of Madness"	Neil Young	Crosby, Stills, Nash & Young	3:19
15.	"Wooden Ships"	David Crosby, Paul Kantner, Stephen Stills	Crosby, Stills, Nash & Young	6:45
16.	"Bummer"		CSNY et al.	1:03
17.	"49 Bye-Byes"	Stephen Stills	Crosby, Stills, Nash & Young	5:19

=== Disc ten – Paul Butterfield Blues Band, Sha Na Na, Jimi Hendrix ===
No.	Title	Writer(s)	Performer/Announcer	Length
1.	"No Amount of Loving"	Paul Butterfield	Paul Butterfield Blues Band	6:04
2.	"Love March"	Phillip Wilson, Gene Dinwiddie	Paul Butterfield Blues Band	11:04
3.	"Everything Gonna Be Alright"	Walter Jacobs	Paul Butterfield Blues Band	9:22
4.	"Test"		Chip Monck & Sha Na Na	1:21
5.	"Get a Job"	Earl Beal, Ray Edwards, William Horton, Richard Lewis	Sha Na Na	2:28
6.	"Come Go with Me"	Clarence Quick	Sha Na Na	2:32
7.	"Silhouettes"	Bob Crewe, Frank Slay	Sha Na Na	2:57
8.	"At the Hop"	Artie Singer, John Medora, David White	Sha Na Na	2:58
9.	"Duke of Earl"	Eugene Dixon, Earl Edwards, Bernice Williams	Sha Na Na	2:00
10.	"Get a Job (reprise)"	Earl Beal, Ray Edwards, William Horton, Richard Lewis	Sha Na Na	0:26
11.	"Thank you for making all this possible"		Chip Monck	1:41
12.	"Hear My Train A Comin'"	Jimi Hendrix	Jimi Hendrix	9:12
13.	"Izabella"	Jimi Hendrix	Jimi Hendrix	4:48
14.	"The Star-Spangled Banner/Purple Haze"	Francis Scott Key, John Stafford Smith/Jimi Hendrix	Jimi Hendrix	13:39
15.	"Good wishes, good day, and a good life"		Chip Monck	3:32

== Personnel ==
=== Musical artists ===
Day one

- Richie Havens — vocal, guitar; Paul 'Deano' Williams — guitar, vocal; Daniel Ben Zebulon — congas
- Sweetwater Nansi Nevins — vocal, guitar; Albert Moore — flute, vocal; August Burns — cello; Alex del Zoppo — keyboards, vocal; R.G. Carlyle — electric guitar, bongos, vocal; Fred Herrera — electric bass, vocal; Alan Malarowitz — drums; Elpidio 'Pete' Cobian — congas
- Bert Sommer — vocal, guitar; Ira Stone — electric guitar, organ, harmonica; Charlie Bilello — bass
- Tim Hardin — vocal, guitar; Richard Bock — cello; Gilles Malkine — guitar; Ralph Towner — guitar, piano; Glen Moore — bass; Muruga Booker — drums
- Ravi Shankar — sitar; Alla Rakha — tabla; Maya Kulkami — tambura
- Melanie Safka — vocal, guitar
- Arlo Guthrie — vocal, guitar; John Pilla — guitar; Bob Arkin — bass; Paul Motian — drums
- Joan Baez — vocal, guitar; Richard Festinger — guitar; Jeffrey Shurtlieff — vocal, guitar on "Drug Store Truck Drivin' Man"

Day two

- Quill Dan Cole — vocal; Phil Thayer — keyboards, saxophone, flute; Norman Rogers — guitar, vocal; Jon Cole — bass, vocal; Roger North — drums
- Country Joe McDonald — vocal, guitar
- Santana Gregg Rolie — keyboards, vocal; Carlos Santana — guitar; David Brown — bass; Michael Shrieve — drums; José Areas, Mike Carabello — timbales, congas, percussion
- John Sebastian — vocal, guitar
- Keef Hartley Band Henry Lowther — trumpet, violin; Jimmy Jewell — saxophone; Miller Anderson — guitar, vocal; Gary Thain — bass; Keef Hartley — drums
- The Incredible String Band Mike Heron — vocal, guitar, piano, various; Robin Williamson — vocal, guitar, piano, violin; Christina 'Licorice' McKechnie — organ, vocal; Rose Simpson — bass, recorder, vocal, percussion
- Canned Heat Bob Hite — vocal, harmonica; Alan Wilson — vocal, guitar, harmonica; Harvey Mandel — guitar; Larry Taylor — bass; Adolpho de la Parra — drums
- Mountain Leslie West — vocal, guitar; Steve Knight — keyboards; Felix Pappalardi — bass; Norman 'N.D.' Smart — drums
- The Grateful Dead Jerry Garcia, Bob Weir — vocals, guitars; Ron 'Pigpen' McKernan, Tom Constanten — keyboards, vocals; Phil Lesh — bass; Mickey Hart, Bill Kreutzmann — drums
- Creedence Clearwater Revival John Fogerty — vocal, guitar, harmonica; Tom Fogerty — rhythm guitar, vocal; Stu Cook — bass; Doug 'Cosmo' Clifford — drums
- Janis Joplin — vocal; Luis Gasca — trumpet; Terry Clements — tenor saxophone; Cornelius 'Snooky' Flowers — baritone saxophone, vocal; Richard Kermode — keyboards; John Till - guitar; Brad Campbell — bass; Maury Baker — drums
- Sly and the Family Stone Cynthia Robinson — trumpet; Jerry Martini — saxophone; Sly Stone — vocal, keyboards; Rose Stone — keyboards, vocal; Freddie Stone — guitar, vocal; Larry Graham — bass, vocal; Gregg Errico — drums
- The Who Roger Daltrey — vocal; Pete Townshend — guitar, vocal; John Entwistle — bass, vocal; Keith Moon — drums
- Jefferson Airplane Marty Balin, Grace Slick — vocals; Nicky Hopkins — piano; Paul Kantner, Jorma Kaukonen — guitars, vocals; Jack Casady — bass; Spencer Dryden — drums

Day three

- Joe Cocker — vocal; Chris Stainton — keyboards; Henry McCullough — guitar, vocal; Alan Spenner — bass, vocal; Bruce Rowland — drums
- Country Joe and the Fish Country Joe McDonald — vocal, guitar; Mark Kapner, Barry Melton — guitars; Doug Metzner — bass; Greg Dewey — drums
- Ten Years After Alvin Lee — vocal, guitar; Chick Churchill — keyboards; Leo Lyons — bass; Ric Lee — drums
- The Band Richard Manuel — vocal, piano, organ; Garth Hudson — organ, piano; Robbie Robertson — guitar, vocal; Rick Danko — vocal, bass; Levon Helm — vocal, drums
- Johnny Winter — vocal, guitar; Tommy Shannon — bass; John Turner — drums
- Blood, Sweat & Tears Lew Soloff, Chuck Winfield — trumpets, flugelhorns; Jerry Hyman — trombone; Fred Lipsius — alto saxophone, piano; Dick Halligan — keyboards, trombone, flute; David Clayton-Thomas, Steve Katz — vocals, guitars; Jim Fielder — bass; Bobby Colomby — drums
- Crosby, Stills, Nash & Young David Crosby, Graham Nash — vocals, guitars; Stephen Stills, Neil Young — vocals, guitars, organ; Greg Reeves — bass; Dallas Taylor — drums
- Paul Butterfield Blues Band Keith Johnson, Steve Madaio — trumpets; David Sanborn, Trevor Lawrence — saxophones; Gene Dinwiddie — vocal, tenor saxophone; Paul Butterfield — vocal, harmonica; Howard 'Buzzy' Feiten — guitar; Rod Hicks — bass; Phillip Wilson — drums
- Sha Na Na Alan Cooper, Dave Garrett, Frederick 'Dennis' Greene, Richard Joffe, Rob Leonard, Scott Powell, Donny York — vocals; Joe Witkin — keyboards; Elliot Cahn, Henry Gross — guitars; Bruce Clarke III — bass; Jocko Marcellino — drums
- Jimi Hendrix — vocal, guitar; Larry Lee — rhythm guitar; Billy Cox — bass, vocal; Mitch Mitchell — drums; Juma Sultan — percussion; Jerry Velez — congas

=== Production ===
- Andy Zax, Steve Woolard, Brian Kehew — reissue producers
- Eddie Kramer, Lee Osborne — original location recording engineers
- Dave Schulz, James Clarke, Mike Sawitzke — mastering and mixing engineers
- Suzanne Savage — project supervision
- Mike Engstrom, Shannon Ward — product and packaging managers
- Sheryl Farber, Allison Boron — editorial supervisors
- Lisa Glines, Masaki Koike — art supervision, direction, and design
- Henry Diltz, Dan Garson, Baron Wolman — photography
