= Woodstock – Back to the Garden: 50th Anniversary Collection =

Live album by various artists
- Released: June 28, 2019
- Recorded: August 15–18, 1969
- Venue: Woodstock festival
- Genre: Rock
- Length: 213:52
- Label: Rhino
- Producers: Andy Zax; Steve Woolard; Brian Kehew

Woodstock albums chronology
Woodstock 40 Years On: Back to Yasgur's Farm (2009)	Woodstock – Back to the Garden: 50th Anniversary Collection (2019)	Woodstock – Back to the Garden: 50th Anniversary Experience (2019)

Woodstock – Back to the Garden: 50th Anniversary Collection is a live album by various artists. It was recorded at the Woodstock music festival, which took place on August 15–18, 1969, in Bethel, New York. It includes 30 songs by 21 different musical artists, in order of performance, along with a number of stage announcements. It was released as a three-disc CD and as a five-disc LP on June 28, 2019.

Woodstock – Back to the Garden: 50th Anniversary Collection contains selections from the 38-CD box set Woodstock – Back to the Garden: The Definitive 50th Anniversary Archive. Another album of selections from the box set is the ten-CD compilation Woodstock – Back to the Garden: 50th Anniversary Experience.

== Song list ==
Woodstock – Back to the Garden: 50th Anniversary Collection includes these song performances:

- Richie Havens – "Handsome Johnny" (Lou Gossett, Richie Havens)
- Richie Havens – "Freedom (Motherless Child)" (traditional, arranged by Richie Havens)
- Tim Hardin – "Reason to Believe" (Tim Hardin)
- Arlo Guthrie – "Coming into Los Angeles" (Arlo Guthrie)
- Joan Baez – "Drug Store Truck Drivin' Man" (Roger McGuinn, Gram Parsons)
- Country Joe McDonald – "The Fish Cheer" / "I-Feel-Like-I'm-Fixin'-to-Die Rag" (Country Joe McDonald)
- Santana – "Jingo" (Babatunde Olatunji)
- Santana – "Soul Sacrifice" (José Areas, David Brown, Michael Carabello, Gregg Rolie, Carlos Santana, Michael Shrieve)
- John Sebastian – "Darling Be Home Soon" (John Sebastian)
- Canned Heat – "Going Up the Country" (Alan Wilson)
- Canned Heat – "On the Road Again" (Floyd Jones, Alan Wilson)
- Grateful Dead – "Dark Star" (Jerry Garcia, Mickey Hart, Robert Hunter, Bill Kreutzmann, Phil Lesh, Ron "Pigpen" McKernan, Bob Weir)
- Creedence Clearwater Revival – "Bad Moon Rising" (John Fogerty)
- Creedence Clearwater Revival – "I Put a Spell on You" (Screamin' Jay Hawkins, Herb Slotkin)
- Janis Joplin – "Kozmic Blues" (Janis Joplin, Gabriel Mekler)
- Janis Joplin – "Piece of My Heart" (Bert Berns, Jerry Ragovoy)
- Sly and the Family Stone – "Dance to the Music" / "Music Lover" / "I Want to Take You Higher" (Sly Stone)
- The Who – "We're Not Gonna Take It" (Pete Townshend)
- The Who – "My Generation" (Pete Townshend)
- Jefferson Airplane – "Somebody to Love" (Darby Slick)
- Jefferson Airplane – "Volunteers" (Marty Balin, Paul Kantner)
- Joe Cocker – "With a Little Help from My Friends" (John Lennon, Paul McCartney)
- Ten Years After – "I'm Going Home" (Alvin Lee)
- The Band – "The Weight" (Robbie Robertson)
- Blood, Sweat & Tears – "Spinning Wheel" (David Clayton-Thomas)
- Crosby, Stills, Nash & Young – "Suite: Judy Blue Eyes" (Stephen Stills)
- Crosby, Stills, Nash & Young – "Sea of Madness" (Neil Young)
- Crosby, Stills, Nash & Young – "Wooden Ships" (David Crosby, Paul Kantner, Stephen Stills)
- Butterfield Blues Band – "Love March" (Gene Dinwiddie, Phillip Wilson)
- Sha Na Na – "At the Hop" (John Medora, Artie Singer, David White)

== Personnel ==
Production

- Produced for release by Andy Zax, Steve Woolard
- Sound produced by Andy Zax, Brian Kehew
- Mixing: Brian Kehew
- Mastering: Dave Schultz
- Original 8-track and mono recordings: Hanley Sound, Inc.
- Location recording engineers: Edwin H. Kramer, Lee Osborne
- Art supervision: Lisa Glines
- Art direction, design: Masaki Koike
- Liner notes: Andy Zax, Jesse Jarnow
