= Woodstock – Back to the Garden: The Definitive 50th Anniversary Archive =

Live album by various artists
- Released: August 2, 2019
- Recorded: August 15–18, 1969
- Venue: Woodstock festival
- Genre: Rock
- Length: 36:21:52
- Label: Rhino
- Producer: Andy Zax; Steve Woolard; Brian Kehew

Woodstock albums chronology
Woodstock – Back to the Garden: 50th Anniversary Experience (2019)	Woodstock – Back to the Garden: The Definitive 50th Anniversary Archive (2019)

Woodstock – Back to the Garden: The Definitive 50th Anniversary Archive is a live album by various artists, packaged as a box set of 38 CDs. It contains nearly all of the performances from the Woodstock music festival, which took place on August 15–18, 1969, in Bethel, New York. The CDs also include many stage announcements and miscellaneous audio material. The box set also contains bonus material such as a Blu-ray copy of the director's cut of the Woodstock documentary film, a hardcover book written by concert promoter Michael Lang, and a replica of the original concert program. It was released by Rhino Records on August 2, 2019, in a limited edition of 1,969 copies.

The box set was nominated for two Grammy Awards at the 2020 Grammys, in the categories of Best Historical Album (producers Andy Zax, Steve Woolard, and Brian Kehew and mastering engineer Dave Schultz) and Best Boxed or Special Limited Edition Package (art director Masaki Koike), winning for the latter.

== Related albums ==
Two albums of selections from the box set were released by Rhino Records on June 28, 2019.

Woodstock – Back to the Garden: 50th Anniversary Experience is a ten-CD album with 162 tracks (including music and stage announcements) selected from the box set. It includes songs performed by all of the artists who played at the Woodstock festival.

Woodstock – Back to the Garden: 50th Anniversary Collection, on three CDs or five LPs, features 42 tracks selected from the box set.

== Production ==
Woodstock – Back to the Garden: The Definitive 50th Anniversary Archive presents almost all of the music of the Woodstock festival in the order in which it was performed. Not included in the 38-CD box set are two songs from Jimi Hendrix's set, as the Hendrix estate did not authorize their release. These songs, which were sung by guitarist Larry Lee, are "Mastermind" and a medley of "Gypsy Woman" / "Aware of Love". Also missing are one-and-a-half songs from Sha Na Na's set that were not captured on tape – "A Teenager in Love" and the first part of "Little Darlin'".

Before it sold out, the box set was priced at US$800.

== Critical reception ==
Hua Hsu praised the 38-CD 50th Anniversary Archive album's attention to historical detail in The New Yorker, saying "Woodstock – Back to the Garden was produced by Andy Zax and Steve Woolard. Zax, an accomplished archivist and reissue specialist, spent more than a decade putting it together from hundreds of tapes that had never been consolidated in one place. In the process of reconstructing the festival, hour by hour, Zax has destroyed some myths."

Caryn Rose, writing in Pitchfork about the 38-CD 50th Anniversary Archive album, said "[T]he true revelation of this release is simply how great the newly restored recordings sound. Zax and Kehew approached the mixing by referring to photographic documentation, which allowed them to situate the performers within the mix based on where they were standing onstage. Comparing the original soundtrack to the 2019 product is like switching from black and white to Technicolor: The compression and flatness that choked the life out of the original release is gone. The result is a sonically welcoming experience that is as immersive as you could want; it is a joy to listen to."

Stephen Thomas Erlewine, writing on AllMusic about the 10-CD 50th Anniversary Experience album, said "[Producer Andy] Zax's decision not to sweeten or fix the original tapes doesn't mean the set sounds rocky. On the contrary, the sound is vivid and alive, lending a kinetic kick to both rock bands and folk singers, yet it still sounds like a document of a specific time and place. ... [T]he whole weekend sounds exploratory and adventurous in a way that years of nostalgia have obscured."

== Track listing ==
The CDs in the Definitive 50th Anniversary Archive box set are:

Day 1:

- Disc 1 – Richie Havens
- Disc 2 – Sweetwater
- Disc 3 – Bert Sommer
- Disc 4 – Tim Hardin
- Disc 5 – Ravi Shankar
- Disc 6 – Melanie
- Disc 7 – Arlo Guthrie
- Disc 8 – Joan Baez

Day 2:

- Disc 9 – Quill
- Disc 10 – Country Joe McDonald
- Disc 11 – Santana
- Disc 12 – John Sebastian
- Disc 13 – Keef Hartley Band
- Disc 14 – The Incredible String Band
- Disc 15 – Canned Heat
- Disc 16 – Canned Heat, continued
- Disc 17 – Mountain
- Disc 18 – Grateful Dead
- Disc 19 – Grateful Dead, continued
- Disc 20 – Creedence Clearwater Revival
- Disc 21 – Janis Joplin
- Disc 22 – Sly and the Family Stone
- Disc 23 – The Who
- Disc 24 – Jefferson Airplane
- Disc 25 – Jefferson Airplane, continued

Day 3:

- Disc 26 – Joe Cocker and the Grease Band
- Disc 27 – Joe Cocker and the Grease Band, continued
- Disc 28 – Country Joe and the Fish
- Disc 29 – Ten Years After
- Disc 30 – The Band
- Disc 31 – Johnny Winter
- Disc 32 – Blood, Sweat & Tears
- Disc 33 – Crosby, Stills, Nash & Young
- Disc 34 – Butterfield Blues Band
- Disc 35 – Sha Na Na
- Disc 36 – Jimi Hendrix
- Disc 37 – Jimi Hendrix, continued
- Disc 38 – A farewell and four appendices

== Personnel ==
Production

- Produced for release by Andy Zax, Steve Woolard
- Sound produced by Andy Zax, Brian Kehew
- Compilation, assembly, editing: Andy Zax
- Mixing: Brian Kehew
- Mastering: Dave Schultz
- Original 8-track and mono recordings: Hanley Sound, Inc.
- Location recording engineers: Edwin H. Kramer, Lee Osborne
- Art supervision: Lisa Glines
- Art direction, design: Masaki Koike
- Liner notes: Andy Zax, Jesse Jarnow, Ellen Sander
