= Quill (album) =

Studio album by Quill
- Released: January 1970
- Recorded: Natural Sound Studios, 1969
- Genre: Psychedelic rock, progressive rock
- Length: 38:46
- Label: Cotillion
- Producer: Quill for SAJE XPT

Quill is the only album by the band of the same name, released in 1970 on the Cotillion Records label.

== Track listing ==
All songs composed by Jon and Dan Cole, unless otherwise noted.

1. "Thumbnail Screwdriver" – 5:22
2. "Tube Exuding" – 3:47
3. "They Live The Life" – 9:16
4. "BBY" – 4:58
5. "Yellow Butterfly" – 4:09
6. "Too Late" – 3:52 (Norm Rogers)
7. "Shrieking Finally" – 7:30

== Personnel ==
- Jon Cole: bass, vocals
- Dan Cole: vocals, percussion
- Norman Rogers: guitars
- Roger North: drums, percussion
- Phil Thayer: keyboards
