= Woodstock =

1969 music festival in Bethel, New York, US

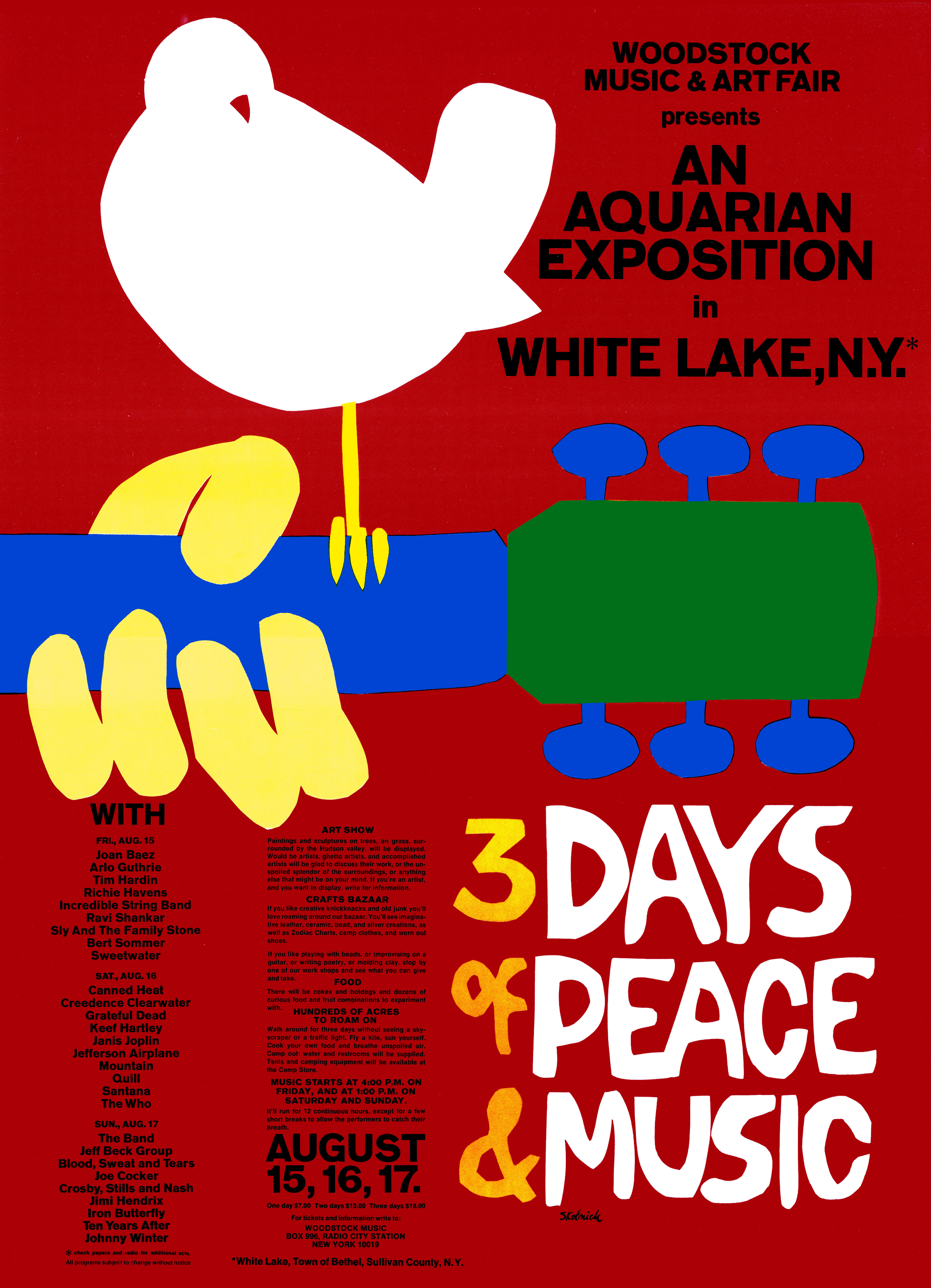
- Promotional poster designed by Arnold Skolnick. Originally, the bird was perched on a flute.
- Genre: Folk; rock; blues rock; folk rock; hard rock; jazz fusion; Latin; psychedelic rock; progressive rock; Southern rock; jam band
- Dates: August 15–17, 1969 (scheduled); August 15–18, 1969 (actual)
- Location: Bethel, New York
- Coordinates: 41°42′05″N 74°52′49″W
- Years active: 1969; 57 years ago
- Founders: Artie Kornfeld; Michael Lang; John P. Roberts; Joel Rosenman; Woodstock Ventures
- Attendance: 460,000 to 500,000 people (estimate)
- Website: www.woodstock.com

Location in the United States
Location in New York

The Woodstock Music and Art Fair, commonly referred to as Woodstock, was a music festival held from August 15 to 18, 1969, on Max Yasgur's dairy farm in Bethel, New York, 60 miles (95 km) southwest of the town of Woodstock. Billed as "an Aquarian Exposition: 3 Days of Peace & Music", it attracted an audience of more than 460,000. Thirty-two acts performed outdoors despite overcast skies and sporadic rain. It was one of the largest music festivals in history and would become the peak musical event to reflect the counterculture of the 1960s.

The festival has become widely regarded as a pivotal moment in popular music history, as well as a defining event for the silent and early baby boomer generations. The event's significance was reinforced by a 1970 documentary film, an accompanying soundtrack album, and a song written by Joni Mitchell that became a major hit for both Crosby, Stills, Nash & Young and Matthews Southern Comfort. Musical events bearing the Woodstock name were planned for anniversaries, including the 10th, 20th, 25th, 30th, 40th, and 50th. In 2004, Rolling Stone magazine listed it as number 19 of the "50 moments that changed the history of rock and roll". In 2017, the festival site became listed on the National Register of Historic Places.

== Planning and preparation ==
Woodstock was initiated through the efforts of Michael Lang, Artie Kornfeld, Joel Rosenman, and John P. Roberts. Roberts and Rosenman financed the project. Lang had some experience as a promoter, having co-organized the Miami Pop Festival on the East Coast the previous year, where an estimated 25,000 people attended the two-day event.

Early in 1969, Roberts and Rosenman were New York City entrepreneurs who were in the process of building Mediasound, a recording studio complex in Manhattan. Lang and Kornfeld's lawyer, Miles Lourie, who had done legal work on the Mediasound project, suggested that they contact Roberts and Rosenman about financing a similar but much smaller studio, Kornfeld, that Lang hoped to build in Woodstock, New York. Unpersuaded by this Studio-in-the-Woods proposal, Roberts and Rosenman counter-proposed a concert featuring the kind of artists known to frequent the Woodstock area, such as Bob Dylan and the Band. Kornfeld and Lang agreed to the new plan, and Woodstock Ventures was formed in January 1969. The company offices were located in an oddly decorated floor of 47 West 57th Street in Manhattan. Burt Cohen and his design group, Curtain Call Productions, oversaw the psychedelic transformation of the office.

From the start there were differences in approach among the four. Roberts was disciplined and knew what was needed for the venture to succeed, while the laid-back Lang saw Woodstock as a new, "relaxed" way of bringing entrepreneurs together. When Lang was unable to find a site for the concert, Roberts and Rosenman, growing increasingly concerned, took to the road and found a venue. Similar differences about financial discipline made Roberts and Rosenman wonder whether to pull the plug or to continue pumping money into the project.

In April 1969, Creedence Clearwater Revival became the first act to sign a contract for the event, agreeing to play for $10,000 (equivalent to $88,000 in 2025). The promoters had experienced difficulty in landing big-name groups until Creedence committed to play. Creedence drummer Doug Clifford later commented: "Once Creedence signed, everyone else jumped in line and all the other big acts came on." Given their 12:30 am start time and omission from the Woodstock film (at Creedence frontman John Fogerty's insistence), Creedence members have expressed bitterness over their experiences regarding the festival.

Woodstock was conceived as a profit-making venture. It became a "free concert" when circumstances prevented the organizers from installing fences and ticket booths before opening day. Tickets for the three-day event cost US$18 in advance and $24 at the gate (equivalent to about $160 and $210 today). Ticket sales were limited to record stores in the greater New York City area, or by mail via a post office box at the Radio City Station Post Office located in Midtown Manhattan. Around 186,000 advance tickets were sold. The organizers had anticipated that approximately 50,000 festival-goers would turn up.

=== Selection of venue ===
- Woodstock Music Festival Site
- U.S. National Register of Historic Places
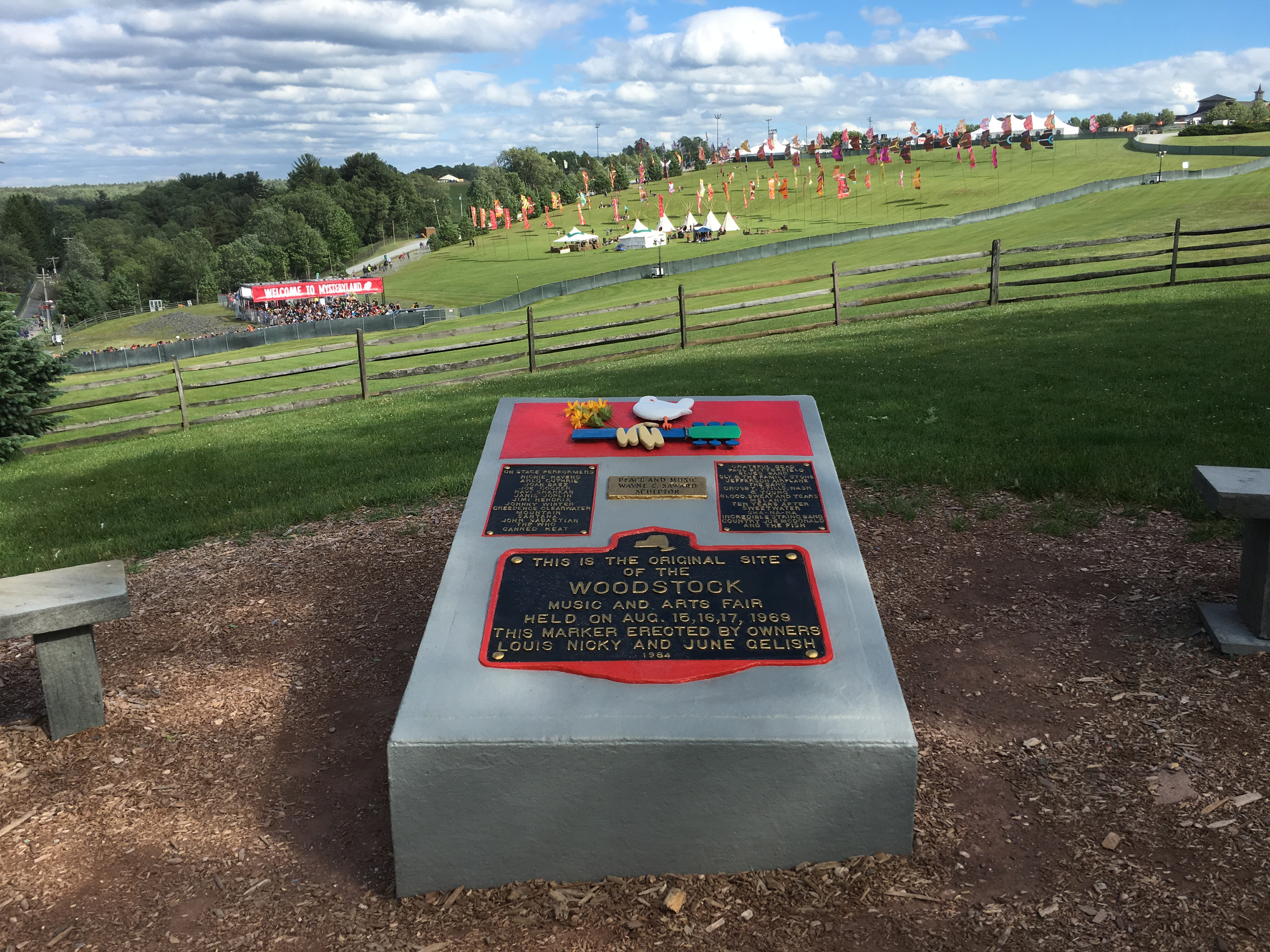
- Location: Generally West Shore, Best, and Perry roads, Bethel, New York
- Coordinates: 41°42′05″N 74°52′49″W
- Area: 300 acres
- NRHP reference No.: 100000684
- Added to NRHP: February 28, 2017

The original plan was for the festival to take place in the town of Woodstock on a site owned by Alexander Tapooz. After local residents rejected that idea, Lang and Kornfeld thought they had found another possible location at the Winston Farm in Saugerties, New York. But they were mistaken, as the landowner's attorney made clear in a brief meeting with Roberts and Rosenman. Growing alarmed at the lack of progress, Roberts and Rosenman took over the search for a venue, and discovered the 300-acre (120 ha; 0.47 sq mi; 1.2 km^{2}) Mills Industrial Park (41.4782°N 74.3641°W) in the town of Wallkill, Orange County, New York, which Woodstock Ventures leased for US$10,000 (equivalent to $88,000 today) in the Spring of 1969. Town officials were assured that no more than 50,000 would attend. Town residents immediately opposed the project. In early July, the Town Board passed a law requiring a permit for any gathering of over 5,000 people. The conditions upon which a permit would be issued made it impossible for the promoters to continue construction at the Wallkill site. Reports of the ban, however, turned out to be a publicity bonanza for the festival.

Max Yasgur's dairy farm in 1968

In his 2007 book Taking Woodstock, Elliot Tiber relates that he offered to host the event on his 15-acre (6.1 ha; 650,000 sq ft; 61,000 m^{2}) motel grounds, and had a permit for such an event. He claims to have introduced the promoters to dairy farmer Max Yasgur. Lang, however, disputes Tiber's account and says that Tiber introduced him to a realtor, who drove him to Yasgur's farm without Tiber. Sam Yasgur, Max's son, agrees with Lang's account. Yasgur's land formed a natural bowl sloping down to Filippini Pond on the land's north side. The stage would be set up at the bottom of the hill with Filippini Pond forming a backdrop. The pond became a popular skinny dipping destination. Filippini was the only landowner who refused to sign a lease for the use of his property. The organizers again told Bethel authorities that they expected no more than 50,000 people.

Despite opposition from the residents and signs proclaiming, "Buy No Milk. Stop Max's Hippy Music Festival", Bethel Town Attorney Frederick W. V. Schadt, building inspector Donald Clark and Town Supervisor Daniel Amatucci approved the festival permits, although the Bethel Town Board refused to issue the permits formally. Clark was ordered to post stop-work orders. Rosenman recalls meeting Don Clark and discussing with him how unethical it was for him to withhold permits which had already been authorized, and which he had in his pocket. At the end of the meeting, Inspector Clark gave him the permits. The stop work order was lifted, allowing the festival to proceed pending backing by the Department of Health and Agriculture, and removal of all structures by September 1, 1969.

The late change in venue did not give the festival organizers enough time to prepare. At a meeting three days before the event, Rosenman was asked by the construction foremen to choose between (a) completing the fencing and ticket booths, without which Roberts and Rosenman would be facing almost certain bankruptcy after the festival, or (b) trying to complete the stage, without which it would be a weekend of half a million concert-goers with no concerts. The next morning, on Wednesday, it became clear that option (a) had disappeared. Overnight, 50,000 "early birds" had arrived and had planted themselves in front of the half-finished stage. For the rest of the weekend, concert-goers simply walked on to the site with or without tickets. The festival left Roberts and Rosenman close to financial ruin, but their ownership of the film and recording rights turned their finances around when the Academy Award-winning documentary film Woodstock was released in March 1970.

== Festival ==
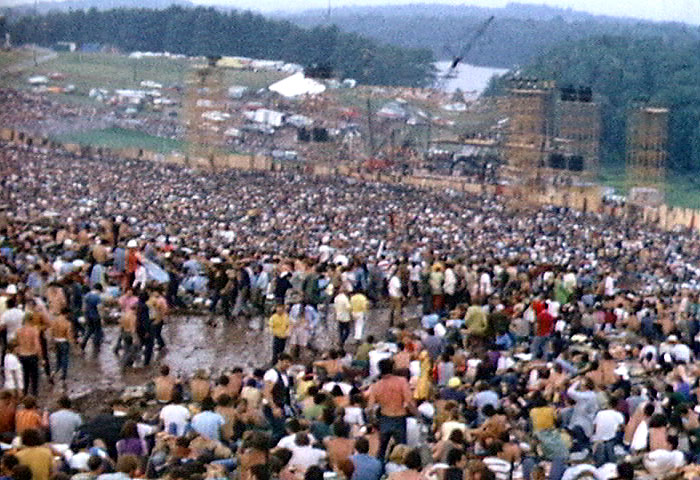
Woodstock festival site with the stage

The influx of people to the rural concert site in Bethel created a huge traffic jam. The town of Bethel did not enforce its codes, fearing chaos as crowds flowed to the site. Radio and television descriptions of the traffic jams eventually discouraged people from setting off to the festival. Arlo Guthrie made an announcement that was included in the film saying that the New York State Thruway was closed, although the director of the Woodstock museum said that this did not happen. To add to the problems and difficulty in dealing with the large crowds, recent rain had created muddy roads and fields. The facilities were not adequate to provide sanitation or first aid for the number of people attending, and hundreds of thousands found themselves in a struggle against bad weather, food shortages and poor sanitation.

The event's security was to be handled by a group of 346 off-duty New York City police officers, but the officers were forced to withdraw when they were warned that they were violating regulations against moonlighting. On the morning of Sunday, August 17, New York governor and future vice president Nelson Rockefeller called festival organizer John P. Roberts and told him that he was thinking of ordering 10,000 National Guard troops to the festival site, but Roberts persuaded him not to. Sullivan County declared a state of emergency. During the festival, personnel from nearby Stewart Air Force Base helped to ensure order and air-lifted performers in and out of the site.

Jimi Hendrix was the last to perform at the festival, taking the stage at 8:30 Monday morning after delays caused by the rain. By that point the audience numbers had fallen to about 30,000 from an estimated peak of 450,000. Many left during Hendrix's performance, having waited to catch a glimpse of him. Hendrix and his new band Gypsy Sun and Rainbows were introduced as the Experience, but he corrected this and added: "You could call us a Band of Gypsies". They performed a two-hour set, including his psychedelic rendition of the national anthem, which became "part of the sixties Zeitgeist" after it was captured in the Woodstock film.

We were ready to rock out and we waited and waited and finally it was our turn ... there were a half million people asleep. These people were out. It was sort of like a painting of a Dante scene, just bodies from hell, all intertwined and asleep, covered with mud.

And this is the moment I will never forget as long as I live: A quarter mile away in the darkness, on the other edge of this bowl, there was some guy flicking his Bic, and in the night I hear, "Don't worry about it, John. We're with you." I played the rest of the show for that guy.

— John Fogerty recalling Creedence Clearwater Revival's 12:30 a.m. start time at Woodstock

The festival was remarkably peaceful given the number of people and the conditions involved, although there were three recorded fatalities: two drug overdoses and another caused when a tractor ran over a 17-year-old sleeping in a nearby hayfield. Births were claimed to have occurred, one in a car caught in traffic and another in hospital after an airlift by helicopter, but extensive research by a book author could not confirm any births. Several miscarriages were reported (sources range from four to eight) and over the course of the three days there were 742 drug overdoses.

Max Yasgur, who owned the site, spoke of how nearly half a million people had spent the three days with music and peace on their minds. He stated, "If we join them, we can turn those adversities that are the problems of America today into a hope for a brighter and more peaceful future".

=== Sound ===
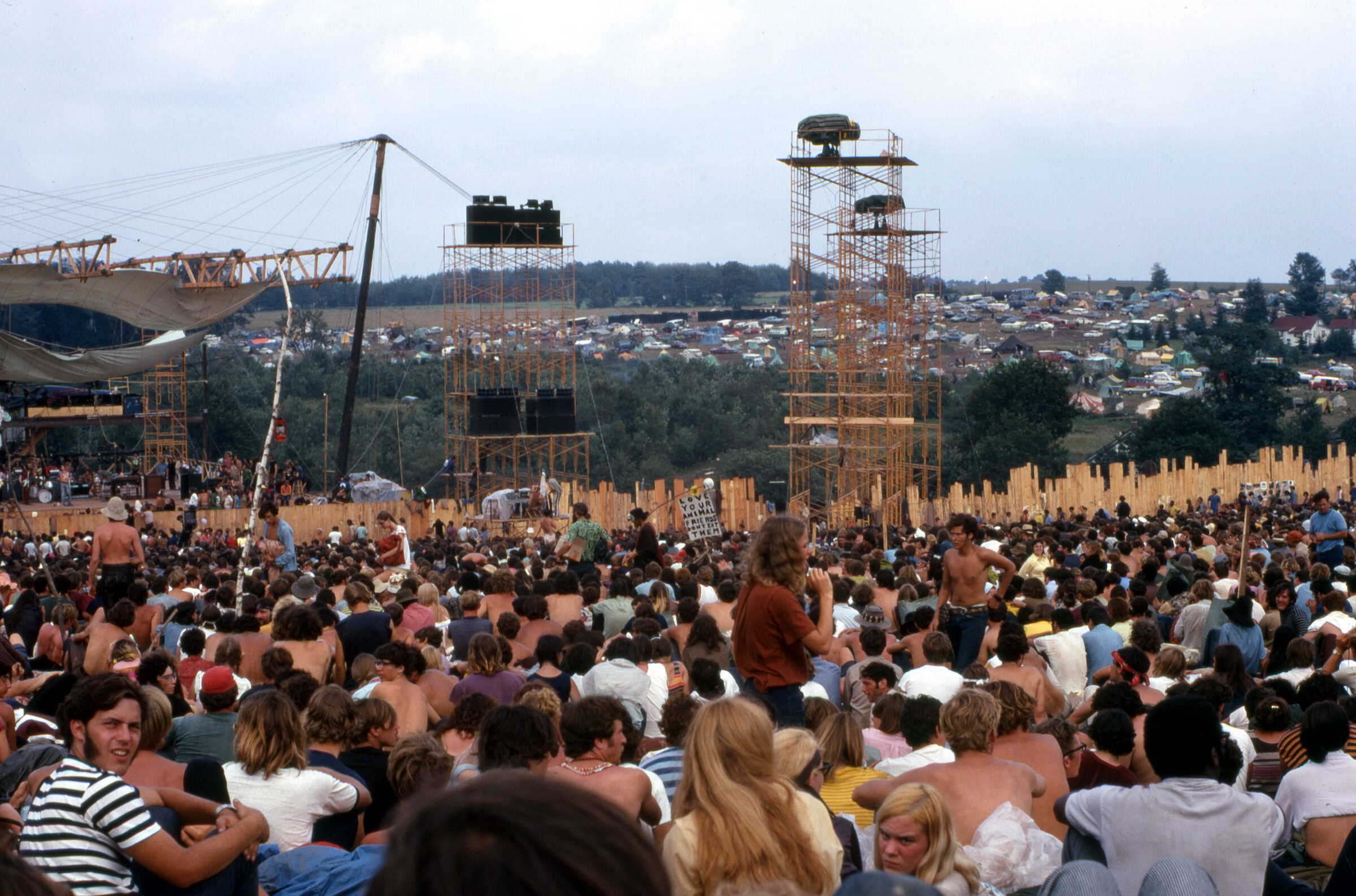
Joe Cocker performs on stage at left before crowd and huge lighting/sound towers.

Sound for the concert was engineered by sound engineer Bill Hanley. "It worked very well", he said of the event. "I built special speaker columns on the hills and had 16 loudspeaker arrays in a square platform going up to the hill on 70-foot [21 m] towers. We set it up for 150,000 to 200,000 people. Of course, 500,000 showed up." ALTEC designed marine plywood cabinets that weighed half a ton apiece and stood 6 feet (1.8 m) tall, almost 4 feet (1.2 m) deep, and 3 feet (0.91 m) wide. Each of these enclosures carried four 15-inch (380 mm) JBL D140 loudspeakers. The tweeters consisted of 4×2-Cell & 2×10-Cell Altec Horns. Behind the stage were three transformers providing 2,000 amperes of current to power the amplification setup. For many years this system was collectively referred to as the Woodstock Bins. The live performances were captured on two 8-track Scully recorders in a tractor trailer backstage by Eddie Kramer and Lee Osbourne on 1-inch Scotch recording tape at 15 ips (0.38 m/s), then mixed at the Record Plant studio in New York.

=== Lighting ===
Lighting for the concert was engineered by lighting designer and technical director E. H. Beresford "Chip" Monck. Monck was hired to plan and build the staging and lighting, ten weeks of work for which he was paid $7,000 (equivalent to $61,000 today). Much of his plan had to be scrapped when the promoters were not allowed to use the original location in Wallkill, New York. The stage roof that was constructed in the shorter time available was not able to support the lighting that had been rented, which wound up sitting unused underneath the stage. The only light on the stage was from spotlights.

Monck used twelve 1300 Watt Super Trouper follow spots rigged on four towers around the stage. The follow spots weighed 600 pounds (270 kg) each and were operated by spotlight operators who had to climb up on the top of the 60-foot-high (18 m) lighting towers.

Monck also was drafted just before the concert started as the master of ceremonies when Michael Lang noticed he had forgotten to hire one. He can be heard and seen in recordings of Woodstock making the stage announcements, including requests to "stay off the towers" and the warning about the "brown acid".

=== Artists ===
Thirty-two acts performed over the course of the four days:

Friday, August 15 – Saturday, August 16
Artist	Time	Notes
Richie Havens	5:07 pm – 5:54 pm	Was moved up to the opening performance slot after Sweetwater were stopped by police en route to the festival and other artists were delayed on the freeway.
Swami Satchidananda	5:55 pm – 6:10 pm	Gave the opening speech/invocation for the festival.
Sweetwater	6:15 pm – 7:20 pm	
Bert Sommer	7:35 pm – 8:15 pm	Received the festival's first standing ovation after his performance of Simon and Garfunkel's "America".
Tim Hardin	8:30 pm – 9:35 pm	
Ravi Shankar	12:00 am – 12:40 am	Played through the rain.
Melanie	1:00 am – 1:25 am	Sent onstage for an unscheduled performance after the Incredible String Band declined to perform during the rainstorm. Called back for two encores.
Arlo Guthrie	1:45 am – 2:25 am	
Joan Baez	3:00 am – 4:00 am	Was six months pregnant at the time.

Saturday, August 16 – Sunday, August 17
Artist	Time	Notes
Quill	12:15 pm – 1:00 pm	
Country Joe McDonald	1:00 pm – 1:30 pm	Brought in for an unscheduled emergency solo performance when Santana was not yet ready to take the stage. Joe performed again with the Fish the following day.
Santana	2:00 pm – 2:45 pm	Carlos Santana claimed he was hallucinating on mescaline throughout most of the performance.
John Sebastian	3:30 pm – 3:55 pm	Sebastian was not on the bill, but rather was attending the festival, and was recruited to perform while the promoters waited for many of the scheduled performers to arrive.
Keef Hartley Band	4:45 pm – 5:30 pm	
The Incredible String Band	6:00 pm – 6:30 pm	Originally slated to perform on the first day following Ravi Shankar; declined to perform during the rainstorm and were moved to the second day.
Canned Heat	7:30 pm – 8:45 pm	
Mountain	9:00 pm – 10:00 pm	This performance was only their third gig as a band.
Grateful Dead	10:30 pm – 11:50 pm	Their set ended after a 36-minute version of "Turn On Your Love Light".
Creedence Clearwater Revival	12:30 am – 1:20 am	
Janis Joplin with the Kozmic Blues Band	2:00 am – 3:00 am	
Sly and the Family Stone	3:30 am – 4:20 am	
The Who	5:00 am – 6:05 am	Briefly interrupted by Abbie Hoffman.
Jefferson Airplane	8:00 am – 9:40 am	Joined onstage on piano by Nicky Hopkins.

Sunday, August 17 – Monday, August 18
Artist	Time	Notes
Joe Cocker and the Grease Band	2:00 pm – 3:25 pm	Played "With a Little Help From My Friends". After Joe Cocker's set, a thunderstorm disrupted the events for several hours.
Country Joe and the Fish	6:30 pm – 7:30 pm	Country Joe McDonald's second performance.
Ten Years After	8:15 pm – 9:15 pm	
The Band	10:00 pm – 10:50 pm	Called back for an encore.
Johnny Winter	12:00 am – 1:05 am	Winter's brother, Edgar Winter, is featured on three songs. Called back for an encore.
Blood, Sweat & Tears	1:30 am – 2:30 am	Declined to participate in documentary film or soundtrack album because of dissatisfaction with the sound quality of their performance.
Crosby, Stills, Nash & Young	3:00 am – 4:00 am	An acoustic and electric set were played. Neil Young skipped most of the acoustic set.
Paul Butterfield Blues Band	6:00 am – 7:10 am	
Sha Na Na	7:30 am – 8:00 am	Their 18-year-old guitarist Henry Gross was the youngest musician to perform at the festival.
Jimi Hendrix / Gypsy Sun & Rainbows	9:00 am – 11:00 am	Performed to a last-day crowd of about 40,000 people.

=== Declined invitations or missed connections ===
- The Beatles were recording Abbey Road at the time and on the verge of breaking up. Promoter Michael Lang, realizing the Beatles were not an option, invited John Lennon and the Plastic Ono Band. Due to Lennon's position on Vietnam and 1968 drug bust in England, Richard Nixon and the U.S. government reportedly did not want him in the country. Apple Corps sent a letter to the promoters offering the Plastic Ono Band, but the letter arrived as promoters were losing the location in Wallkill, so distractions did not allow arrangements to be finalized.
- The Jeff Beck Group disbanded prior to Woodstock. "I deliberately broke the group up before Woodstock," Beck said. "I didn't want it to be preserved." Beck's piano player Nicky Hopkins performed with Jefferson Airplane.
- Blues Image agreed to appear at the Woodstock festival, according to a 2011 interview with percussionist Joe Lala. Their manager did not want them to go and said, "There's only one road in and it's going to be raining, you don't want to be there". The band instead took a gig at Binghamton.
- The Byrds were invited but chose not to participate, believing that Woodstock would be no different from any of the other music festivals that summer. There were also concerns about money. Bassist John York later said, "We had no idea what it was going to be. We were burned out and tired of the festival scene."
- Chicago had initially been signed to play at Woodstock, but they had a contract with concert promoter Bill Graham which allowed him to move their concerts at the Fillmore West. He rescheduled some of their dates to August 17, thus forcing them to back out of the concert. Graham did so to ensure that Santana would take their slot at the festival, as he managed them as well.
- Eric Clapton wanted his supergroup Blind Faith to play the festival, which occurred during their only tour, but was outvoted by the rest of the group.
- The Doors were considered but canceled at the last moment. According to guitarist Robby Krieger, they turned it down because they thought that it would be a "second class repeat of Monterey Pop Festival" and later regretted that decision. Other sources claim that lead singer Jim Morrison "hated playing large outdoor concerts and feared [...] he might be assassinated." Krieger and Doors drummer John Densmore did attend Woodstock, "though they did not perform." The Doors would later appear at the 1970 Isle of Wight Festival, and Krieger later made a guest performance with post-grunge band Creed at the ill-fated Woodstock '99.
- Donovan was denied a U.S. work visa due to a prior drug conviction.
- Bob Dylan lived in the town of Woodstock but never seriously negotiated to appear. Instead, he signed in mid-July to play the 1969 Isle of Wight Festival on August 31. He intended to travel to England on Queen Elizabeth 2 on August 15, the day that the Woodstock Festival started, but his son was injured by a cabin door and the family disembarked. Dylan and his wife Sara flew to England the following week. The Band accompanied him during his Isle of Wight appearance.
- Free was asked to perform and declined, although they did perform at the Isle of Wight Festival a week later.
- The Guess Who were invited to perform and declined, according to former band member Randy Bachman. However, vocalist Burton Cummings later confirmed that there was no such invitation.
- Iron Butterfly was booked to appear, and is listed on the Woodstock poster for a Sunday performance, but could not perform because they were stuck at LaGuardia Airport. According to Production Coordinator John Morris, "They sent me a telegram saying, 'We will arrive at LaGuardia. You will have helicopters pick us up. We will fly straight to the show. We will perform immediately, and then we will be flown out.' And I picked up the phone and called Western Union ... And [my telegram] said: For reasons I can't go into / Until you are here / Clarifying your situation / Knowing you are having problems / You will have to find /Other transportation /Unless you plan not to come.'"
- It's a Beautiful Day had a verbal agreement with Michael Lang to perform at the festival. Violinist and band leader David LaFlamme said their manager Bill Graham wanted Santana, who he also managed, to play the festival instead. Lang and Graham agreed to flip a coin to decide which band would play, Graham won, and Santana performed instead.
- Tommy James and the Shondells claimed to have declined an invitation. James stated: "We could have just kicked ourselves. We were in Hawaii, and my secretary called and said, 'Yeah, listen, there's this pig farmer in upstate New York that wants you to play in his field.' That's how it was put to me. So we passed, and we realized what we'd missed a couple of days later."
- Jethro Tull also declined. According to Ian Anderson, he knew that it would be a big event, but he did not want to go because he did not like hippies and had other concerns, including inappropriate nudity, heavy drinking, and drug use.
- Led Zeppelin were asked to perform. Their manager Peter Grant stated: "I said no because at Woodstock we'd have just been another band on the bill."
- Lighthouse declined to perform at Woodstock.
- Arthur Lee and Love declined an invitation, in part due to turmoil within the band.
- Mind Garage declined because they thought that the festival would be a minor event, and they had a higher paying gig elsewhere.
- Joni Mitchell was originally slated to perform, but canceled at the urging of her manager to avoid missing a scheduled appearance on The Dick Cavett Show. She later composed the song "Woodstock" inspired by what she saw on television.
- Essra Mohawk was scheduled to perform at the festival, but her driver took a wrong turn on the way. "We got there in time to see the last verse of the last song of the last act of the first night, and then the stage went dark before we got to it from the parking lot," she recalled in a 2009 video interview.
- The Moody Blues were included on the original Wallkill poster as performers, but they backed out after being booked in Paris the same weekend.
- Laura Nyro was invited by Woodstock creator Michael Lang to perform at Woodstock but her crippling stage fright prevented her from accepting the invitation. She would miss out on numerous gigs due to negative reception she received at the Monterey Pop Festival.
- Poco were offered a chance to perform at the festival, but their manager turned it down for a concert at a Los Angeles school gymnasium.
- Procol Harum were invited, but refused because Woodstock fell at the end of a long tour and also coincided with the due date of guitarist Robin Trower's baby.
- The Rascals were invited to play, but declined because they were in the middle of recording a new album.
- Raven turned down an invitation to play because they played at one of the Woodstock Sound-Outs the year before and it did not go well.
- Rotary Connection turned down Woodstock for a better-paying gig in Toronto.
- Roy Rogers was asked to close the festival with "Happy Trails", but he declined.
- The Rolling Stones were invited, but declined because Mick Jagger was in Australia filming Ned Kelly, and Keith Richards' girlfriend Anita Pallenberg had just given birth to their son Marlon.
- Simon & Garfunkel declined the invitation, as they were working on their new album.
- Spirit also declined an invitation to play, as they already had shows planned and wanted to play those instead, not knowing how big Woodstock would be.
- Steel Mill, Bruce Springsteen's then band, was reportedly offered a slot but was already booked.
- Steppenwolf was contacted to play Woodstock, but according to John Kay in his autobiography, turned it down as they had already played some festivals and were getting tired of dealing with them.
- Strawberry Alarm Clock declined an invitation because they did not think Woodstock would be "that big of a deal".
- Zager and Evans were invited to play Woodstock and appear on American Bandstand, but Rick Evans was injured by a drunk driver in a crash.
- Frank Zappa was then with the Mothers of Invention; he said, "A lot of mud at Woodstock ... We were invited to play there, we turned it down."

=== Media coverage ===
Magazine advertisement promoting the Woodstock Music & Art Fair's "Aquarian Exposition", to be held in Wallkill, NY

Very few reporters from outside the immediate area were on the scene. During the first few days of the festival, national media coverage emphasized the problems. Front-page headlines in the Daily News read "Traffic Uptight at Hippiefest" and "Hippies Mired in a Sea of Mud". The New York Times ran an editorial titled "Nightmare in the Catskills", which read in part, "The dreams of marijuana and rock music that drew 300,000 fans and hippies to the Catskills had little more sanity than the impulses that drive the lemmings to march to their deaths in the sea. They ended in a nightmare of mud and stagnation ... What kind of culture is it that can produce so colossal a mess?" Coverage became more positive by the end of the festival, in part because the parents of concertgoers called the media and told them, based on their children's phone calls, that their reporting was misleading.

The New York Times covered the prelude to the festival and the move from Wallkill to Bethel. Barnard Collier, who reported from the event for The New York Times, asserted that he was pressured by on-duty editors at the paper to write a misleadingly negative article about the event. According to Collier, this led to acrimonious discussions and his threat to refuse to write the article until the paper's executive editor, James Reston, agreed to let him write the article as he saw fit. The eventual article dealt with issues of traffic jams and minor lawbreaking, but went on to emphasize cooperation, generosity, and the good nature of the festival goers. When the festival was over, Collier wrote another article about the exodus of fans from the festival site and the lack of violence at the event. The chief medical officer for the event and several local residents were quoted as praising the festival goers.

Middletown, New York's Times Herald-Record, the only local daily newspaper, editorialized against the law that banned the festival from Wallkill. During the festival, a rare Saturday edition was published. The paper had the only phone line running out of the site, and it used a motorcyclist to get stories and pictures from the impassable crowd to the newspaper's office 35 miles (56 km) away in Middletown.

East Village Other reported, before Woodstock Music and Arts Fair in the 14 August 1969 issue, and after the event in the 20 August 1969 issue.

== Releases ==
=== Films ===
==== 1970 documentary ====
The documentary film Woodstock, directed by Michael Wadleigh and edited by a crew headed by Thelma Schoonmaker, was released in March 1970. Artie Kornfeld (one of the promoters of the festival) went to Fred Weintraub, an executive at Warner Bros., and asked for money to film the festival. Kornfeld had been turned down everywhere else, but against the express wishes of other Warner Bros. executives, Weintraub put his job on the line and gave Kornfeld $100,000 (equivalent to $880,000 today) to make the film. Woodstock helped to save Warner Bros. at a time when the company was on the verge of going out of business. The book Easy Riders, Raging Bulls details the making of the film.

Wadleigh rounded up a crew of about 100 from the New York film scene. With no money to pay the crew, he agreed to a double-or-nothing scheme, in which the crew would receive double pay if the film succeeded and nothing if it bombed. Wadleigh strove to make the film as much about the hippies as the music, listening to their feelings about compelling events contemporaneous with the festival (such as the Vietnam War), as well as the views of the townspeople.

Woodstock received the Academy Award for Documentary Feature. In 1996, the film was inducted into the Library of Congress National Film Registry. In 1994, Woodstock: The Director's Cut was released and expanded to include Janis Joplin as well as additional performances by Jefferson Airplane, Jimi Hendrix, and Canned Heat not seen in the original version of the film. In 2009, the expanded 40th Anniversary Edition was released on DVD. This release marked the film's first availability on Blu-ray.

==== Other films ====
Woodstock Diary was produced by D. A. Pennebaker in 1994 as a three-part TV documentary miniseries. It was intended to commemorate Woodstock's 25th anniversary and included rare performances and interviews with many of the concert's producers, including Joel Rosenman, John Roberts and Michael Lang.

Jimi Hendrix: Live at Woodstock was produced in 2005 as two-disc set that included all available footage of Hendrix's Woodstock performance in two different edits. The release also included a mini-documentary with members of Hendrix's band, and footage of a September 1969 news conference where he discussed his Woodstock set.

Taking Woodstock was produced in 2009 by Taiwanese American filmmaker Ang Lee. Lee practically rented out the entire town of New Lebanon, New York, to shoot the film. He was initially concerned with not angering the locals, but they ended up being very welcoming and willing to help. The movie is based on Elliot Tiber, played by Demetri Martin, and his role in bringing Woodstock to Bethel, New York. The film also starred Jonathan Groff as Michael Lang, Daniel Eric Gold as Joel Rosenman, and Henry Goodman and Imelda Staunton as Jake and Sonia Teichberg.

Woodstock: Three Days That Defined a Generation is a documentary by Barak Goodman, produced in 2019 by PBS. It focused on Woodstock's social and political context and contained previously unseen footage supplemented by voice-over anecdotes from people at the festival. It focused more on the scenes in the crowd (and around the country) than on the stage.

Woodstock: 3 Days That Changed Everything is another documentary film, also release in 2019, by Rich Poggioli.

Creating Woodstock was directed by Mick Richards and produced in 2019. It looked at how the festival came together, with interviews with producers clarifying some of Woodstock's myths and what it took to get many performers to attend. (Janis Joplin, for example, apparently required a personal supply of strawberries.)

=== Albums ===
==== Soundtrack albums and 25th anniversary releases ====
Two soundtrack albums were released. The first, Woodstock: Music from the Original Soundtrack and More, was a 3-LP (later 2-CD) album containing a sampling of one or two songs by most of the acts who performed. A year later, Woodstock 2 was released as a 2-LP album. Both albums included recordings of stage announcements (many by Production Coordinator John Morris, e.g., "[We're told] that the brown acid is not specifically too good", "Hey, if you think really hard, maybe we can stop this rain") and crowd noises (i.e., the rain chant) between songs. In August 1994, a third album, Woodstock Diary was released, containing music not included on the earlier two albums.

Tracks from all three albums, as well as numerous additional, previously unreleased performances from the festival (but not the stage announcements and crowd noises) were reissued by Atlantic, also in August 1994, as a four compact disc box set titled Woodstock: Three Days of Peace and Music.

An album titled Jimi Hendrix: Woodstock was also released in August 1994, featuring only selected recordings of Jimi Hendrix at the festival.

==== 30th anniversary releases ====
In July 1999, MCA Records released Live at Woodstock, an expanded, double disc set featuring nearly every song of Hendrix's performance, omitting just two pieces that were sung by his rhythm guitarist Larry Lee.

==== 40th anniversary releases ====
In June 2009, complete performances from Woodstock by Santana, Janis Joplin, Sly & the Family Stone, Jefferson Airplane, and Johnny Winter were released separately by Legacy/SME Records, and were also collected in a box set titled The Woodstock Experience.

In August 2009, Rhino/Atlantic Records issued a six-disc box set titled Woodstock 40 Years On: Back to Yasgur's Farm, which included further musical performances as well as stage announcements and other ancillary material.

In October 2009, Joe Cocker released Live at Woodstock, a live album of his entire Woodstock set. The album contains eleven tracks, ten of which were previously unreleased.

==== 50th anniversary releases ====
On August 2, 2019, the Rhino/Atlantic released Woodstock – Back to the Garden: The Definitive 50th Anniversary Archive, a massive 38 disc, 36-hour, 432-song completists' audio box set of nearly every note played at the original 1969 Woodstock festival (including 276 songs that were previously unreleased), a "CD collection [co-produced for Rhino by archivist Andy Zax] that lays the '69 fest out in chronological order, from the first stage announcements to muddy farewells." The only things missing from this 38-CD edition were two Jimi Hendrix songs that his estate did not believe were up to the required standard and some of Sha Na Na's music that missed being captured on tape. Because of various production and warehousing issues, the release of the box set was delayed, causing a backlash and dissatisfaction toward Rhino and Warner Music. More condensed versions—a ten disc deluxe set and a three disc or five LP sampler set—were also released. The full version was limited to a run of only 1,969 copies.

Also released in 2019 was Live at Woodstock, an official album of all 11 songs played by Creedence Clearwater Revival, from "Born on the Bayou" to "Bad Moon Rising" and "Proud Mary". John Fogerty had originally thought the band's performance was unworthy, but this album was finally released both on CD and as a double vinyl LP.

== Aftermath ==
Peace and Music Woodstock monument with plaques by sculptor Wayne C. Saward and erected in 1984 on the festival site (note that John Sebastian's surname is misspelled as "Sabastian" and Bert Sommer's name is missing)

In the years immediately following the festival, Woodstock co-producers John Roberts and Joel Rosenman, along with Robert Pilpel, wrote Young Men with Unlimited Capital: The Inside Story of the Legendary Woodstock Festival Told By The Two People Who Paid for It, a book about the events behind the scenes during the production of the Woodstock Festival.

Bethel voters did not re-elect Supervisor Amatucci in an election held in November 1969 because of his role in bringing the festival to the town and the upset attributed to some residents. Although accounts vary, it was decided by only a small margin of between six and fifty votes. The New York State Legislature and the Town of Bethel also enacted mass gathering laws designed to prevent any more festivals from occurring.

Approximately 80 lawsuits were filed against Woodstock Ventures, primarily by farmers in the area. The movie financed settlements and paid off the $1.4 million of debt (equivalent to $12.3 million today) Roberts and Rosenman had incurred from the festival. Max Yasgur refused to rent out his farm for a 1970 revival of the festival, saying, "As far as I know, I'm going back to running a dairy farm." Yasgur died in 1973.

In 1984, at the original festival site, land owners Louis Nicky and June Gelish put up a monument marker with plaques called "Peace and Music" by a local sculptor from nearby Bloomingburg, Wayne C. Saward.

Attempts were made to prevent people from visiting the site. Its owners spread chicken manure, and during one anniversary, tractors and state police cars formed roadblocks. Twenty thousand people gathered at the site in 1989 during an impromptu 20th anniversary celebration. In 1997 a community group put up a welcoming sign for visitors. Unlike Bethel, the town of Woodstock made several efforts to capitalize on its connection. Bethel's stance eventually changed and the town began to embrace the festival. Efforts were undertaken to forge a link between Bethel and Woodstock.

== Legacy ==
=== Woodstock site today ===
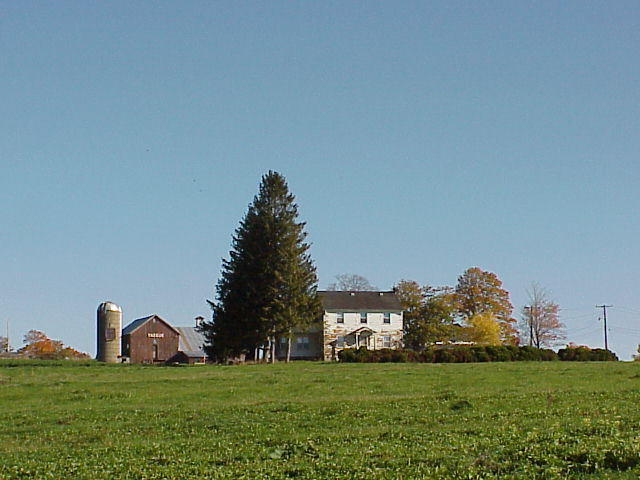
Max Yasgur's farm in 1999

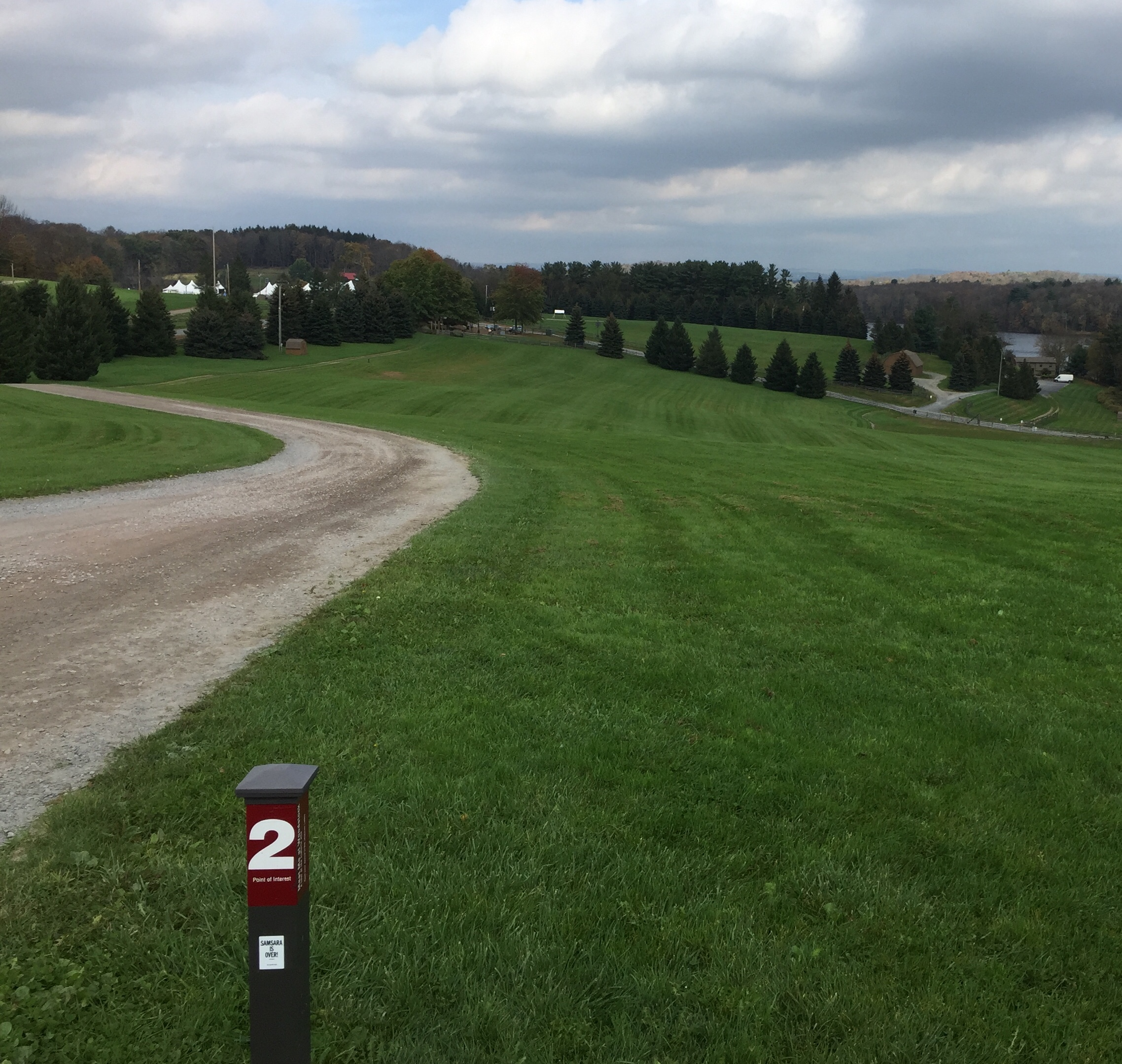
Concert site in October 2021, with stage at location of small trees at center-right rear

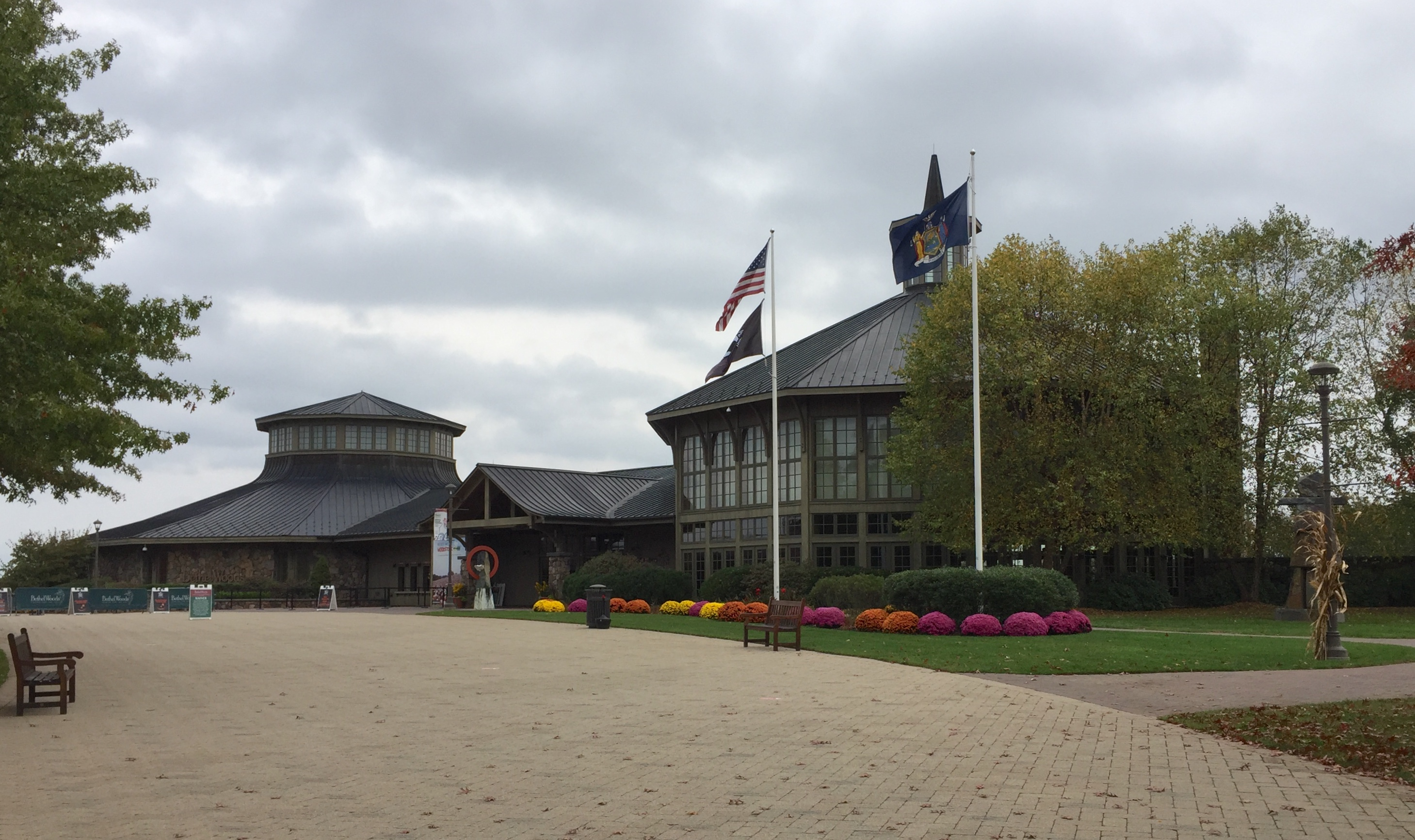
Museum at Bethel Woods

The field and the stage area remain preserved and are open to visitors as part of the Bethel Woods Center for the Arts after being purchased in 1996 by cable television pioneer Alan Gerry for the purpose. The center opened on July 1, 2006, with a performance by the New York Philharmonic on a newly constructed pavilion stage located about 500 yards (460 m) SSE of the site of the 1969 stage. (The site of the original stage is vacant except for a commemorative plaque which was placed in 1984.) In June 2008 the Bethel Woods Center opened a museum dedicated to the experience and cultural significance of the Woodstock festival.

Notable events since the opening of the center have included an August 2006 performance by Crosby, Stills, Nash & Young and the scattering of Richie Havens's ashes in August 2013.

In late 2016 New York's State Historic Preservation Office applied to the National Park Service to have 600 acres (240 ha), including the site of the festival and adjacent areas used for campgrounds, listed on the National Register of Historic Places, and the site was listed on the register in February 2017.

=== Woodstock 40th anniversary ===
There was worldwide media interest in the 40th anniversary of Woodstock in 2009. A number of activities to commemorate the festival took place around the world. On August 15, at the Bethel Woods Center for the Arts overlooking the original site, the largest assembly of Woodstock performing alumni since the original 1969 festival performed in an eight-hour concert in front of a sold-out crowd. Hosted by Country Joe McDonald, the concert featured Big Brother and the Holding Company performing Janis Joplin's hits (she actually appeared with the Kozmic Blues Band at Woodstock, although that band did feature former Big Brother guitarist Sam Andrew), Canned Heat, Ten Years After, Jefferson Starship, Mountain and headliners the Levon Helm Band. At Woodstock, Levon Helm played drums and was one of the lead vocalists with the Band. Paul Kantner was the only member of the 1969 Jefferson Airplane lineup to appear with Jefferson Starship. Tom Constanten, who played keyboard with the Grateful Dead at Woodstock, joined Jefferson Starship on stage for several numbers. Jocko Marcellino from Sha Na Na also appeared, backed up by Canned Heat. Richie Havens, who opened the Woodstock festival in 1969, appeared at a separate event the previous night. Crosby, Stills & Nash and Arlo Guthrie also marked the anniversary with live performances at Bethel earlier in August 2009.

Another event occurred in Hawkhurst, Kent (UK), at a Summer of Love party, with acts including two of the participants at the original Woodstock, Barry Melton of Country Joe and the Fish and Robin Williamson of the Incredible String Band, plus Santana and Grateful Dead cover bands. On August 14 and 15, 2009, a 40th anniversary tribute concert was held in Woodstock, Illinois, and was the only festival to receive the official blessing of the "Father of Woodstock", Artie Kornfeld. Kornfeld later made an appearance in Woodstock with the event's promoters.

Also in 2009, Michael Lang and Holly George-Warren published The Road to Woodstock, which describes Lang's involvement in the creation of the Woodstock Music & Arts Festival, and includes personal stories and quotes from central figures involved in the event.

=== Woodstock 50th anniversary ===
In May 2014, Michael Lang, one of the producers and organizers of the original Woodstock event, revealed plans for a possible 50th anniversary concert in 2019 and that he was exploring various locations. Reports in late 2018 confirmed the plans for a concurrent 50th anniversary event on the original site to be operated by the Bethel Woods Centre for the Arts. The scheduled date for the "Bethel Woods Music and Culture Festival: Celebrating the golden anniversary at the historic site of the 1969 Woodstock festival" was August 16–18, 2019. Bethel Woods described the festival as a "pan-generational music, culture and community event" (including some live performances and talks by) "leading futurists and retro-tech experts".

Michael Lang told a reporter that he also had "definite plans" for a 50th anniversary concert that would "hopefully encourage people to get involved with our lives on the planet" with a goal of re-capturing the "history and essence of what Woodstock was". On January 9, 2019, Lang announced that the official Woodstock 50th anniversary festival would take place on August 16–18, 2019 in Watkins Glen, New York.

On March 19, 2019, the proposed lineup for Woodstock 50 was announced. This included some artists who performed at the original Woodstock festival in 1969: John Fogerty (from Creedence Clearwater Revival), Carlos Santana (as Santana), David Crosby (from Crosby, Stills & Nash), Melanie, John Sebastian, Country Joe McDonald, three Grateful Dead members (as Dead & Company), Canned Heat, and Hot Tuna (containing members of Jefferson Airplane). The event was to take place at Watkins Glen International, the race track in Watkins Glen, New York, the site in 1973 for the Summer Jam at Watkins Glen which drew an estimated 600,000 people.

On April 29, 2019, it was announced that Woodstock 50 had been canceled by investors (Dentsu Aegis Network), who had lost faith in its preparations. The producers "vehemently" denied any cancellation, with Michael Lang telling The New York Times that investors have no such prerogative. After a lawsuit with original financiers, the Woodstock 50 team then announced that it had received help from Oppenheimer & Co. for financing so that the three-day event can continue to take place in August despite the original financiers pulling out. On July 31, 2019, NPR reported that the concert had finally been canceled. The Bethel Woods Center for the Arts did organize a weekend of "low-key" concerts.

=== Local economic impact ===
Woodstock still acts as an economic engine for the local economy. A Bethel Woods report from 2018 indicates that $560.82 million of spending has been generated in New York. With 2.9 million visitors since 2006 and 214,405 visitors in 2018, an equivalent of 172 full-time jobs exist as a result, which includes direct wages of $5.1 million from Bethel Woods in Sullivan County.

== In popular culture ==
As one of the biggest music festivals of all time and a cultural touchstone for the late 1960s, Woodstock has been referenced in many different ways in popular culture. The phrase "the Woodstock generation" became part of the common lexicon. Tributes and parodies of the festival began almost as soon as the festival concluded. Cartoonist Charles Schulz named his recurring Peanuts bird character (which began appearing in 1966 but was still unnamed) Woodstock in tribute to the festival. In April 1970, Mad magazine published a poem by Frank Jacobs and illustrated by Sergio Aragonés titled "I Remember, I Remember The Wondrous Woodstock Music Fair" that parodies the traffic jams and the challenges of getting close enough to actually hear the music. Keith Robertson's 1970 children's book Henry Reed's Big Show has the title character attempting to emulate the success of the festival by having his own concert at his uncle's farm.

In 1973, the stage show National Lampoon's Lemmings portrayed the "Woodchuck" festival, featuring parodies of many Woodstock performers.

Time magazine named "The Who at Woodstock – 1969" to the magazine's "Top 10 Music-Festival Moments" list on March 18, 2010.

In 2005, Argentine writer Edgar Brau published Woodstock, a long poem commemorating the festival. An English translation of the poem was published in January 2007 by Words Without Borders.

In 2017, the singer Lana Del Rey released a song, "Coachella – Woodstock in My Mind," to show her worries about the tensions between North Korea and the United States while she was at Coachella, expressing nostalgia by using the Woodstock festival as a symbol of peace.

In 2017, Portland rock band Portugal. The Man released an album titled Woodstock, inspired by a conversation between frontman John Gourley and his father after the latter discovered his ticket stub for the festival.

In August 2019, the United States Postal Service released a Forever stamp commemorating Woodstock's 50th anniversary. The stamp was designed by Antonio Alcalá, Art Director of the USPS and was first issued at the Metropolitan Museum of Art in New York City on August 8, 2019. The museum was hosting Play it Loud, an exhibit co-organized with the Rock & Roll Hall of Fame consisting of vintage rock and roll instruments, posters, and costumes. Attending the ceremony were Woodstock producers Michael Lang and Joel Rosenman. The ceremony began with a "stirring" electric guitar performance of The Star Spangled Banner by "Captain" Kirk Douglas of the Roots—"reminiscent" of Jimi Hendrix's performance at the original festival.

In 2023, a South Korean organizer officially purchased Woodstock's license and tried to hold a festival in Pocheon, but there was a lot of controversy because of insufficient preparation in the process of preparing for the festival, and it was eventually canceled.

== Gallery ==
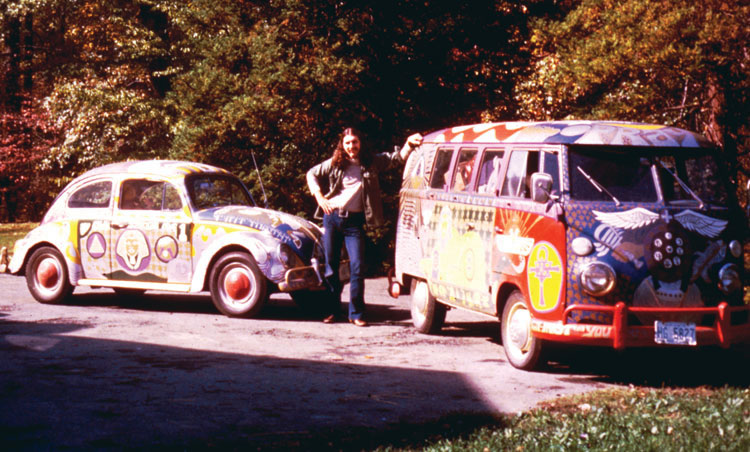
Volkswagens on their way to the festival

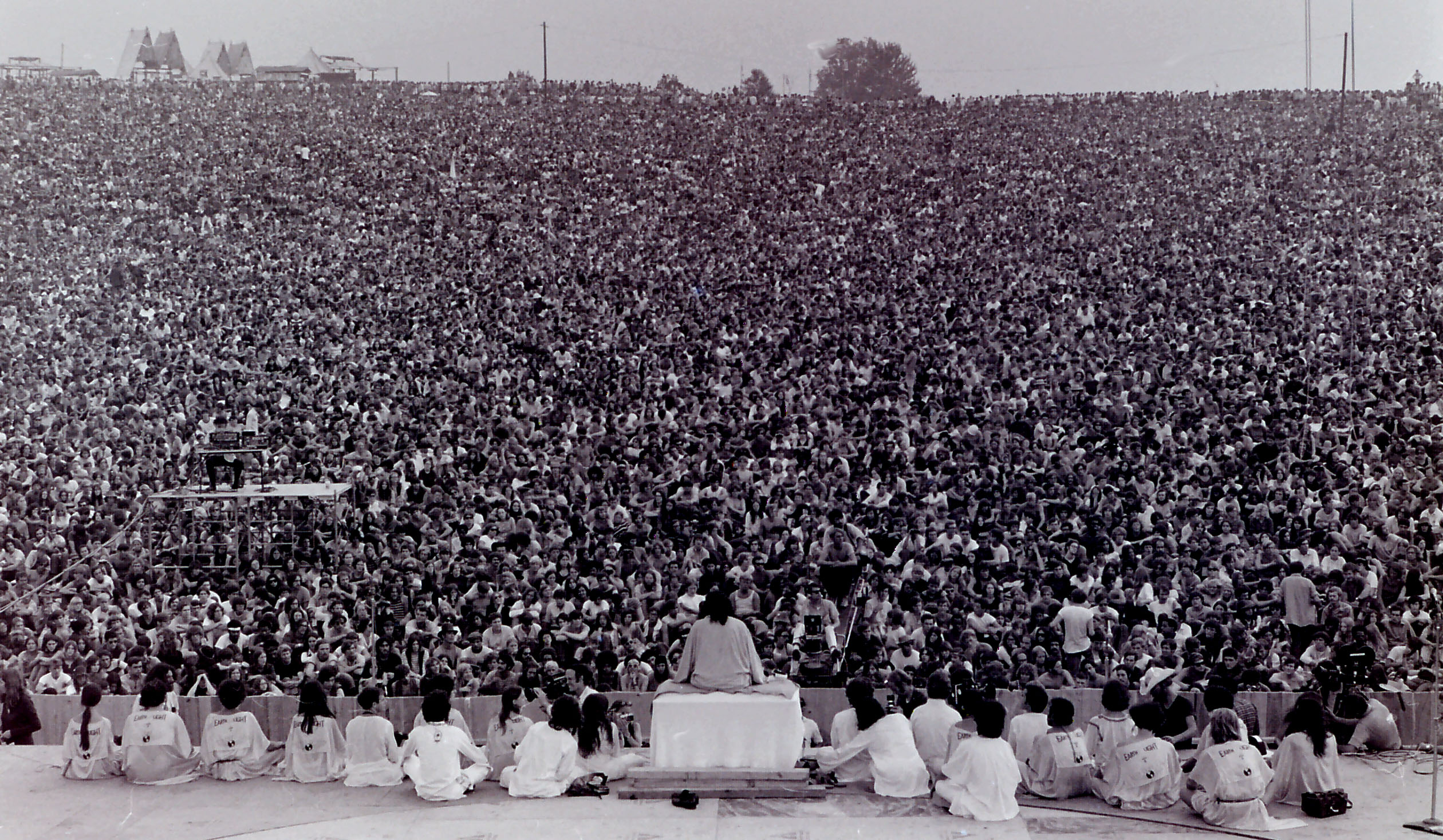
Opening ceremony at Woodstock. Swami Satchidananda giving the opening speech.

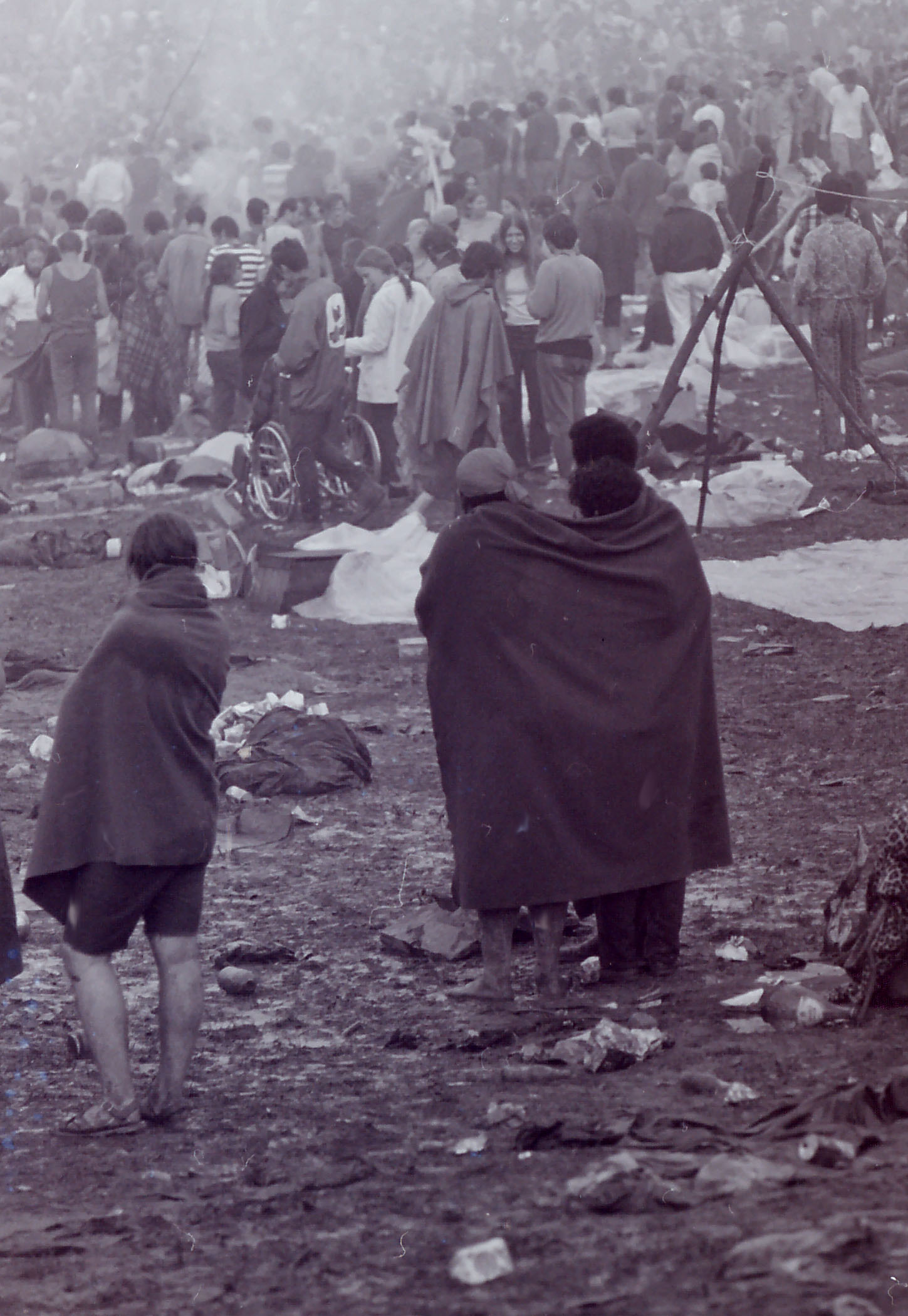
A rainy day (August 15, 1969)

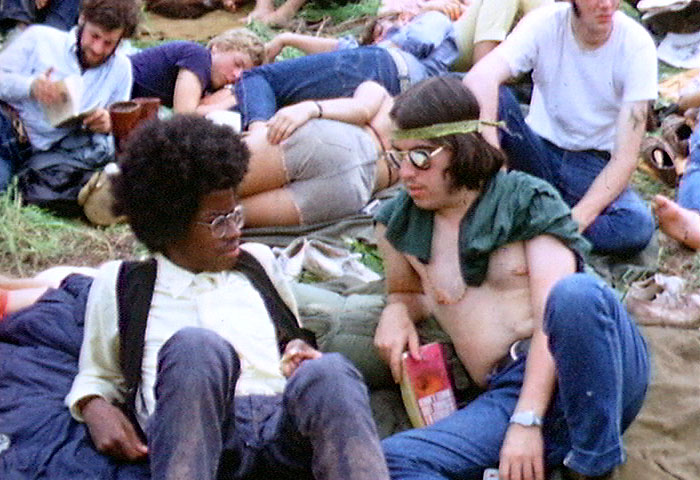
Concert attendees

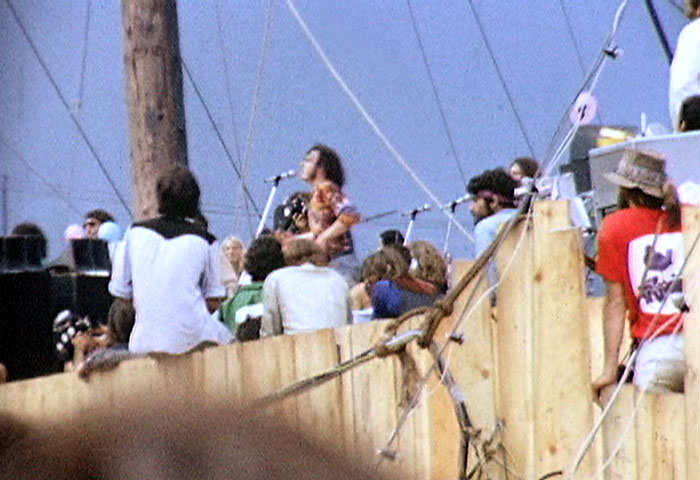
Joe Cocker and the Grease Band performing at Woodstock

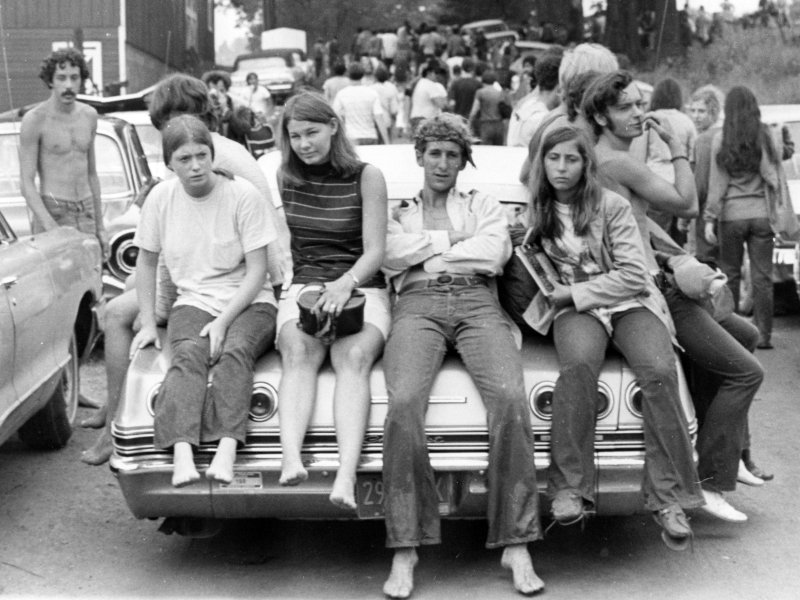
Photo taken near Woodstock on August 18, 1969

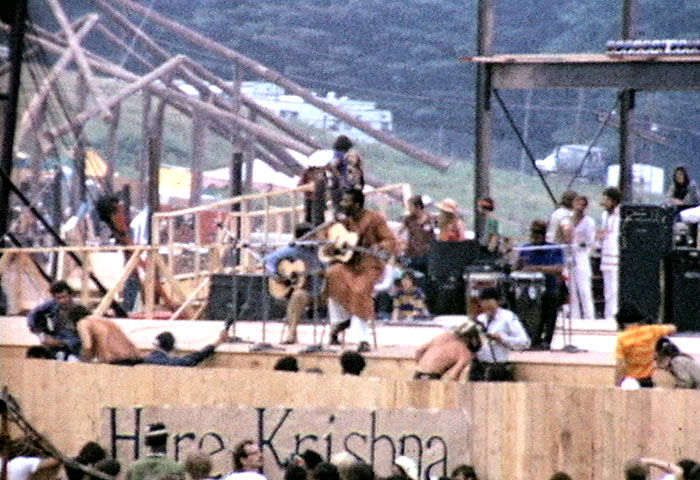
Richie Havens performing at Woodstock

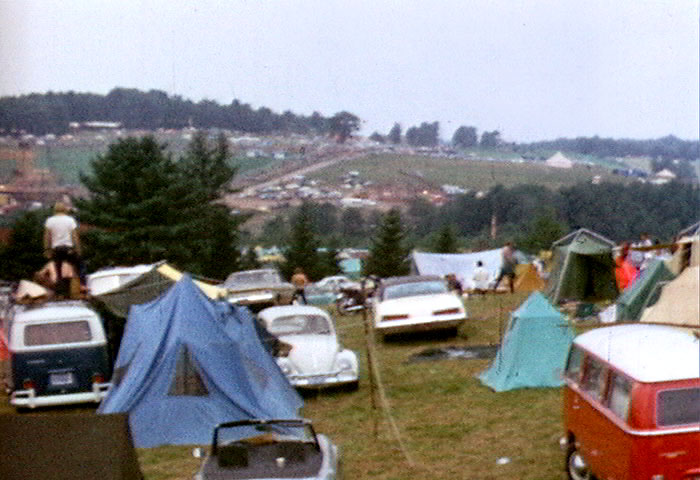
Tents and cars of spectators at Woodstock

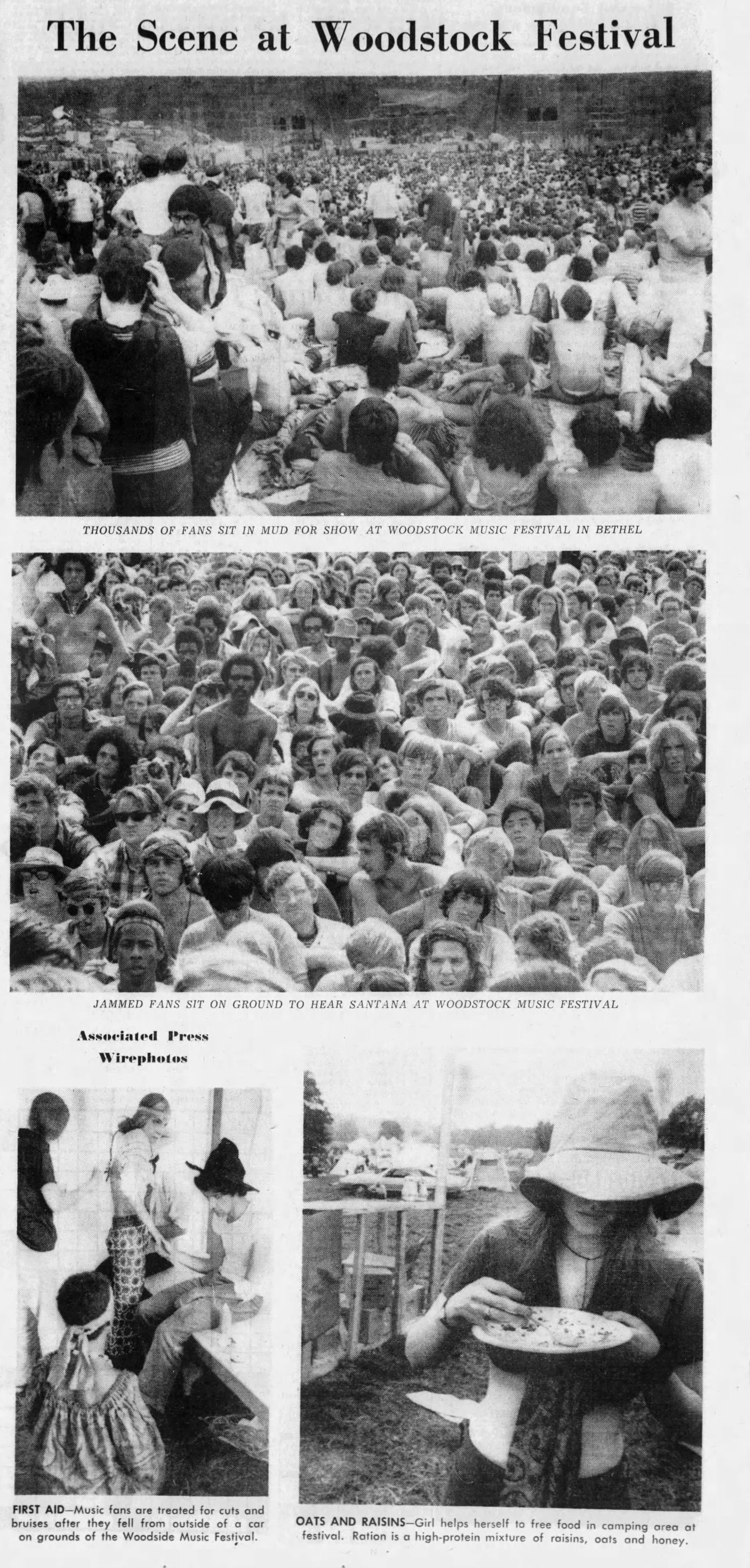
Contemporary newspaper article

== See also ==
- Harlem Cultural Festival, sometimes called the "Black Woodstock", that ran concurrently over July and August 1969
- Nambassa
- National Register of Historic Places listings in Sullivan County, New York
- Przystanek Woodstock (Woodstock Festival Poland)
- Sunbury Pop Festival
- Wattstax
- Woodstock '94, a rebooted version of the festival held in Saugerties, New York
- Woodstock '99, a rebooted version of the festival held in Rome, New York
- Peekskill riots. In the Hudson River Valley in August 1949 several performers invited to participate in an open air early afternoon concert in a country setting find a second occasion that several thousand participants find themselves with organised contrasted intent.
