= Andy Zax =

American music historian

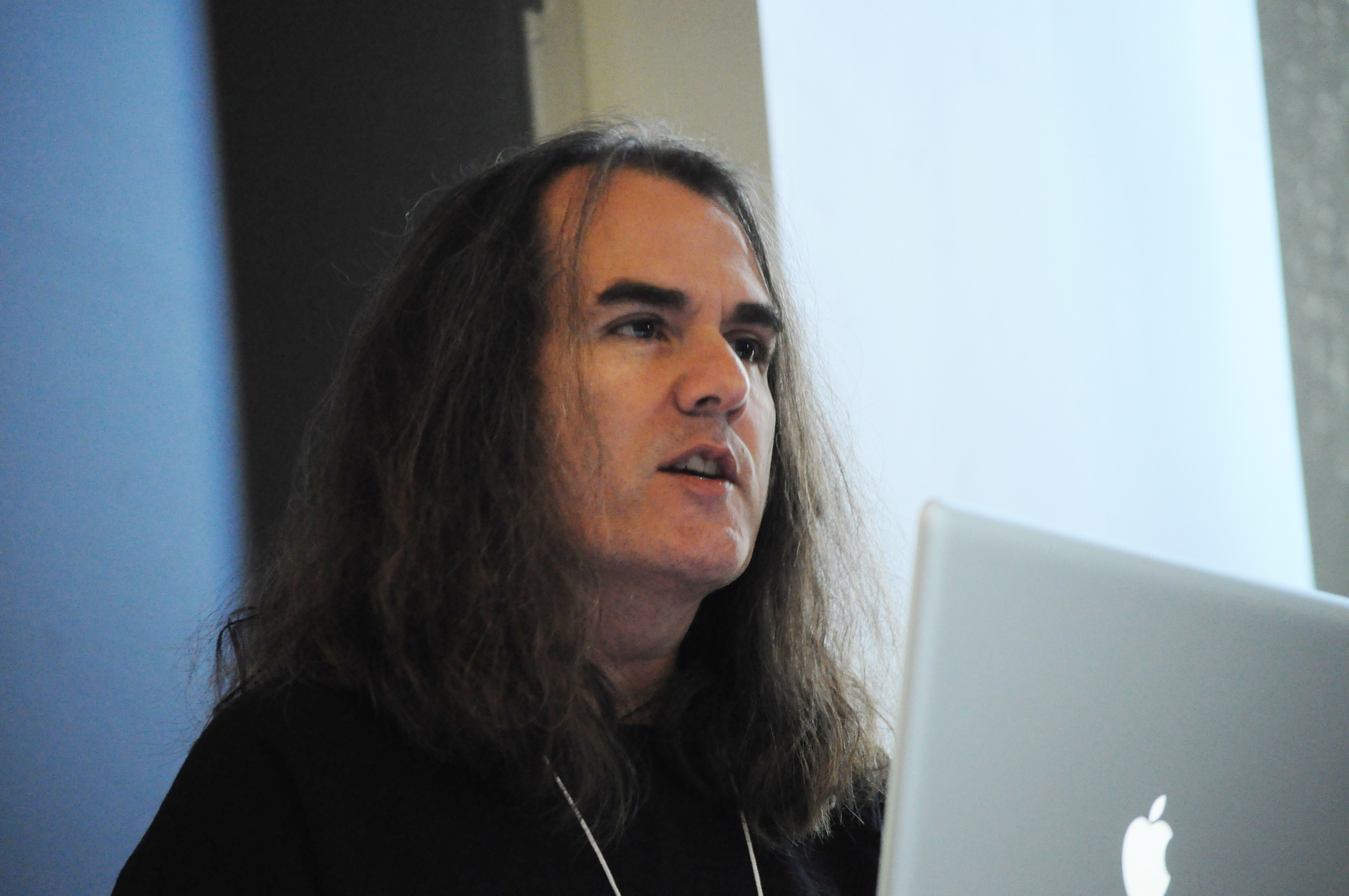
- Occupations: Music producer; music historian
- Years active: 1999–present
- Spouse: Lisa Jane Persky (m. 2008)

Andy Zax is an American music historian and a producer of music reissues.

== Early life and education ==
A Los Angeles native, Zax received a bachelor's degree from Cornell University and a Master of Fine Arts degree from USC Film School. After a year as a motion picture development executive, Zax entered the music business as a copywriter, penning advertising and liner notes for various major labels, collaborating with figures as diverse as Quincy Jones and 4AD founder Ivo Watts-Russell on detailed histories of their work, producing promotional radio specials, and writing the questions for Rhino Records' long-running annual music trivia contest, the Rhino Musical Aptitude Test.

== Music production ==
As a producer of boxed sets and archival music reissues, Zax has been responsible for restoring and remastering the catalogues of Talking Heads, Rod Stewart, Echo & The Bunnymen, Television, Little Richard, Fats Domino, Charles Wright & The Watts 103rd Street Rhythm Band, The Sisters Of Mercy, David Axelrod and Lee Hazlewood, among others. His reissues of once-obscure cult favorites such as Television's Marquee Moon, John Cale's Paris 1919, and Judee Sill and Heart Food by Judee Sill have successfully brought those albums to larger audiences that had eluded them upon their initial release, while his exploration of record company tape vaults has yielded discoveries such as the lost masters of Johnny Mathis's 1981 Chic-produced I Love My Lady. Describing his approach to musical history, Zax has said:

"I like lost causes and I like underdogs and I like people that I feel haven't gotten their due...You know, some records just weren’t of their moment. Judee Sill’s records, maybe they weren't built for 1971, '72. They do feel like they were built for 2007, 2008. That's when I noticed people were starting to really respond to them and now she feels canonical. And that thrills me. I often feel like the best moments are when you're sitting in the studio, you put the multi-track tape on, and you don't know what you’re gonna hear. You kind of feel like you've broken into the tomb and suddenly here are the answers to all of these questions. You hear it, and then have a karmic obligation to present it to the public, properly and correctly. To me, you get the reward then. All of the work that comes after is just the price you pay for getting that upfront."

As a result of his experiences working with master recordings, Zax has become an advocate on behalf of their preservation and restoration in the wake of archival disasters such as the 2008 Universal Studios fire. “You don’t have to be Walter Benjamin to understand that there’s a big difference between a painting and a photograph of that painting," he has said. "It’s exactly the same with sound recordings. The future of all of the recorded music that we have ever heard—and, for that matter, all of the recorded music that we haven’t heard yet—depends on our ability to maintain these artifacts.”

=== Woodstock ===
In late 2005, Zax visited a Warner Brothers tape storage space in Los Angeles and encountered dozens of boxes of one-inch eight-track recordings from the Woodstock Festival. "From the moment I saw those tapes", he said, "I was like, 'Oh my God, there's so much more than I'd ever thought'", he said. "It was clear to me that no one was exploring this stuff and dealing with it in totality. Here was this vast trove of material not treated correctly."

In 2009, to commemorate the 40th anniversary of Woodstock, Zax produced the boxed set Woodstock: 40 Years On: Back to Yasgur's Farm, for which he was nominated for a Grammy for Best Historical Album. Zax and engineer Brian Kehew reconstructed all three days of the Woodstock audio from the original multi-track tapes; "The way we approached all of the material was as if it was a cinéma verité documentary–the raw record of the event", Zax said. Zax was able to establish a definitive setlist for the festival, ending decades of speculation about what order the festival's artists had played in and what material they played. Stereophile concluded in September 2009 that "as the man who spent four years, from initial pitch to finished product, not to mention hours of wading through the personal [and] political muck that surrounds anything with 'Woodstock' in its title, Andy Zax has, semi-reluctantly, become the new 'Mr. Woodstock.'"

For the 50th anniversary of the festival in 2019, Zax achieved his 14-year goal of restoring the Woodstock audio in near-totality—"to reclaim an event that had not necessarily been treated well by history"—producing Woodstock – Back to the Garden: The Definitive 50th Anniversary Archive, a Grammy-winning, 38-disc, 36 hour boxed set containing a near complete reconstruction of Woodstock. Every artist performance from the festival is included in chronological order (with the exception of two songs that the Jimi Hendrix Estate decided were not up to their standards for release). "The Woodstock tapes give us a singular opportunity for a kind of sonic time travel, and my intention is to transport people back to 1969. There aren’t many other concerts you could make this argument about."

== Writing ==
In 2010, Zax created the anonymously-written Twitter account "@Discographies". Each @Discographies tweet contained a "definitive guide to an artist's body of work (studio albums only) in 140 characters". The @Discographies account quickly attracted widespread media attention and acclaim (Michael Azerrad: "@Discographies is at once rock criticism's glittering acme and the final nail in its coffin. Bravo.") and was named "Music Critic Of The Year" by the Village Voice.

Zax's writing, under his own name and the @Discographies pseudonym, has appeared in The New Yorker, Rolling Stone, The Oxford American, iPad newspaper The Daily, Exact Change, and Maggot Brain. In 2014, he received an ASCAP Foundation Deems Taylor/Virgil Thomson Award for his article about the life of composer Tupper Saussy of the Neon Philharmonic, "Scenes From The Chocolate Orchid Piano Bar". In 2025, he received a second Deems Taylor/Virgil Thomson Award for his piece "Extinctophonics: The Game Of Jim"

== Television, radio and stage ==
From 2001 to 2003, Zax co-starred on the Comedy Central game show Beat the Geeks as the show's primary "Music Geek", answering difficult questions about all forms of popular music in order to defeat the show's contestants.

From October 2006 until May 2007, Zax hosted a weekly radio program, Archives of Oblivion, described as "a treasure hunt through the scrapheap of mid-20th Century pop-culture ephemera", showcasing his record collection. He has made occasional appearances as a DJ on dublab and WFMU.

Zax was a recurring panelist on the live stage revival of What's My Line? in Los Angeles and New York City from 2004 to 2008; Los Angeles deemed his performances "fabulous.".

== Personal life ==
On January 19, 2008, he married actress Lisa Jane Persky in Beverly Hills.
