= Chip Monck =

American lighting designer (born 1939

- Born: Edward Herbert Beresford Monck; March 5, 1939 (age 87); Wellesley, Massachusetts, U.S.
- Other names: Chip Monk, Chipmonck
- Education: South Kent School
- Occupations: Lighting designer, staging designer
- Years active: 1959 – present
- Known for: Woodstock Festival
- Awards: 1975 Tony nomination for Lighting Design; 2004 Parnelli Lifetime Achievement Award
- Website: chipmonck.com

Edward Herbert Beresford "Chip" Monck (born March 5, 1939) is an American Tony Award–nominated lighting designer, most famously serving as the master of ceremonies at the 1969 Woodstock Festival.

== Early life and education ==
Monck was born in Wellesley, Massachusetts, to a mother from Nutley, New Jersey and a father from Liverpool, England. He acquired the nickname "Chip" at a summer camp on Lake Winnipesaukee, in New Hampshire. While Monck went to the South Kent School on scholarships for ice hockey and crew, he became more interested in welding and machinery, designing a potato harvester that he sold to McCormick. He began volunteering with a summer-theater group at Wellesley College, learning the basics of theatrical lighting from Greg Harney. He began auditing classes at Harvard University while working with the school's theater company.

== Early career ==
Monck began working at Manhattan's Greenwich Village nightclub Village Gate in 1959, lighting comedians and jazz and folk artists, and living in the basement apartment under the club where Bob Dylan eventually wrote "A Hard Rain's A-Gonna Fall" on Monck's IBM Selectric typewriter. He began extensive relationships with both the Newport Folk Festival and the Newport Jazz Festival, lasting eight and nine years, respectively, while continuing to work at the Village Gate. He became friends with Charles Altman of the Altman Lighting Co., repairing equipment and borrowing lighting instruments to improve the stage lighting of the Gate. He began lighting the stage of the Apollo Theater in Harlem.

In 1967, he lit the Monterey Pop Festival, which featured the first major American appearances by Jimi Hendrix and The Who, as well as the first major public performances of Janis Joplin. Monck's work can be seen in the D. A. Pennebaker film Monterey Pop. That year, he also lit The Byrds at the Hollywood Bowl and his first Rolling Stones concert. The following year, he designed the half-shell stage at the Miami Pop Festival (December 1968), called the Flying Stage, that was one of the festival's two, simultaneously operating main stages. In 1969, he worked with Crosby, Stills and Nash in Europe, and began working with concert impresario Bill Graham, renovating the Fillmore East and Fillmore West theaters.

== Woodstock ==
In 1969, he lit the concert that would define his career and make him a public figure. Monck was hired to plan and build the staging and lighting for the Woodstock Music & Art Fair's "Aquarian Exposition" music festival. Paid $7,000 for ten weeks of work, much of his plan had to be scrapped when the promoters were not allowed to use the original location in Wallkill, New York. The stage roof that was constructed in the shorter time available was not able to support the lighting that had been rented, which wound up sitting unused underneath the stage. The only light on the stage was from spotlights.

Just before the concert started, Monck was drafted as the master of ceremonies when producer Michael Lang noticed that they had forgotten to hire one. He can be heard (and seen) in recordings of Woodstock making the stage announcements, including the warning about the "brown acid".

To get back to the warning that I've received, you might take it with however many grains of salt you wish, that the brown acid that is circulating around us is not specifically too good. It's suggested that you do stay away from that. Of course it's your own trip, so be my guest. But please be advised that there's a warning on that one, okay?

== The Rolling Stones ==
Four months after Woodstock, Monck and Lang planned the Altamont Free Concert for the Rolling Stones, which also had to move from the original planned location, but this time with unfortunate consequences. Members of the Hells Angels motorcycle club were hired to provide security for the concert with terrible results. Monck confronted a member of the Angels stealing a large custom carpet that was part of the Rolling Stones stage set and lost teeth being hit in the mouth with a pool cue. He later tracked down the person and managed to trade a case of brandy for the carpet.

Monck designed an innovative method of stage lighting for the 1972 tour. The Mirror Followspot System was created after Monck felt improvements were possible regarding the inconsistency in how close followspots were to the stage as the distance varied from arena to arena. Instead of raising 3,000 pounds of lamps to overhead trusses, Monck devised an alternate system – a 40' x 8' array of Mylar mirrors. A row of spotlights sitting on the floor behind the stage bounced light off the mirrors onto the stage.

== Later career ==
In 1974, Monck was the host of Speakeasy, a short-lived rock-and-roll talk show that featured mostly chat and some live performances by acts including Tom Waits, Frank Zappa and Emerson, Lake and Palmer. Monck's persona was well known enough to be parodied as "Chick Monck" on SCTV by Tony Rosato as a marriage counselor employing strobe lights and a fog machine.

Also in 1974, he provided production services for the Muhammad Ali/George Foreman boxing match The Rumble in the Jungle, and the associated three-day music festival Zaire 74, which featured performances by James Brown, Celia Cruz and the Fania All-Stars, B.B. King, Miriam Makeba, The Spinners, Bill Withers, and Manu Dibango. Monck's work can be seen in the documentary films Soul Power (2008) and When We Were Kings (1996).

Monck served as the lighting designer for the opening and closing ceremonies of the 1984 Summer Olympics in Los Angeles, as well as consulting on the 2000 Summer Olympics in Sydney.

In 2003, Monck received the Parnelli Award for Lifetime Achievement in the concert touring industry.

As of 2011, Monck resided in the Melbourne suburb of Fitzroy, Australia concentrating on corporate and retail lighting.

In 2011, he served as the director of production of the One Great Night On Earth Festival, planned for December 1, 2012. This event was intended to raise funds to help Australians in regions devastated by natural disasters like the Black Saturday bushfires, flooding and drought.

In 2019, Monck participated in a series of Woodstock 1969 50th anniversary events at the Berklee School of Music in Boston and made additional appearances and was the subject of interviews in a wide variety of international media outlets.

In 2024, Monck's archives; his lighting documents, images, drawings, and media were accepted into the Rock and Roll Hall of Fame museum and archive in Cleveland, Ohio.
