= Bill Hanley (sound engineer) =

American sound engineer

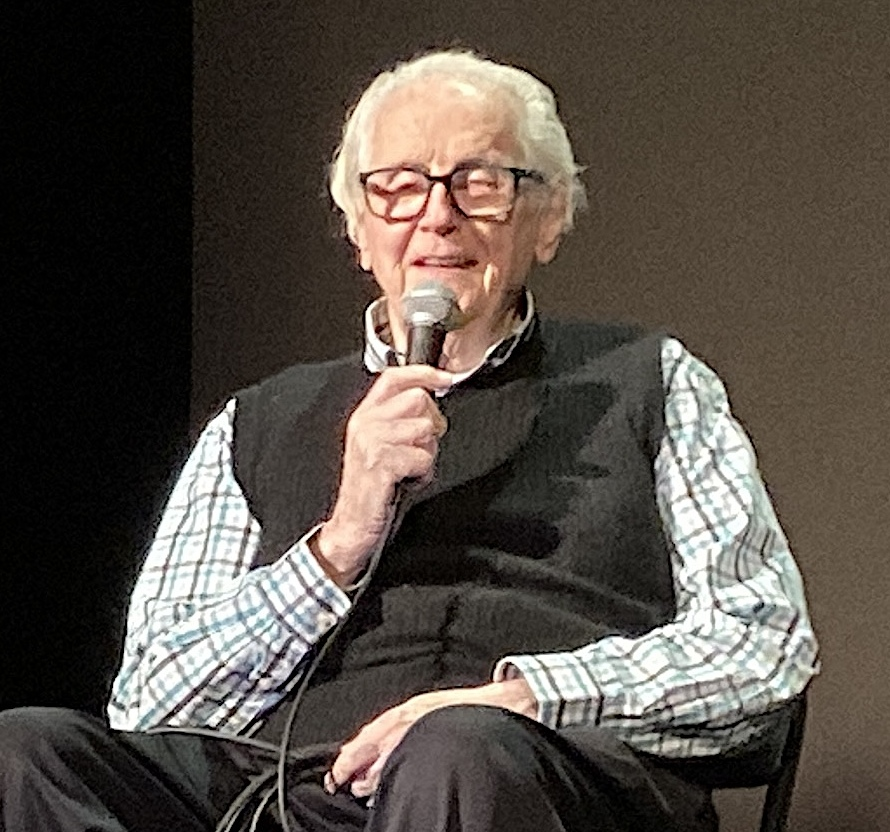
Hanley in 2024

Bill Hanley (born 1937) is an American audio engineer and is regarded as the "father of festival sound". He is most widely known as the sound engineer behind the Woodstock festival in Bethel, New York in August 1969. He was also influential in a number of other festivals. According to Michael Lang, "I was trying to find someone who could do a sound system for Woodstock, and there was no one who had ever done something like that before. Then there was this crazy guy in Boston who might want to take a shot at it."

Hanley ran the soundboard for Bob Dylan's controversial "electric" set at the 1965 Newport Folk Festival. His company also installed a sound system at Bill Graham's Fillmore East. He was also a part of the large rock Mar Y Sol festival in Puerto Rico in 1972.

In 2020, University Press of Mississippi published the book The Last Seat in the House, The Story of Hanley Sound by John Kane discussing Hanley's impact on the field of sound engineering. Kane made the book into a movie which premiered in 2024.

== See also ==
- Woodstock
- 1965 Newport Folk Festival
- Rock festival
- Audio engineer
