= Quill (band) =

American psychedelic rock band

- Origin: Boston, Massachusetts, United States
- Genres: Psychedelic rock, progressive rock, art rock
- Years active: 1967–1970
- Label: Cotillion
- Past members: Jon Cole; Dan Cole; Roger North; Norm Rogers; Phil Thayer

Quill was a rock band that played extensively throughout New England, New York, and the mid-Atlantic states in the late 1960s and gained national attention by performing at the original Woodstock Festival in 1969. The band was founded by two singer-songwriters and brothers from the Boston area, Jon and Dan Cole.

== History ==
The basic lineup included Roger North on drums, Norm Rogers on guitar and Phil Thayer on keyboard, saxophone, and flute, with Jon on bass and Dan doing the bulk of the lead vocals.

Aside from the basic roles of each member of the band, the band was able to mount a variety of instrumental and vocal configurations to play specific songs. Roger North anchored the band on the drums and percussion. The other members of the band would often switch instruments to create different sounds and effects. Jon and Norm both sang some lead vocals while Dan might be playing guitar or trombone, forming a small horn section with Phil on sax; Jon would sometimes switch to guitar with Norm playing bass; Norm was known to trot out his cello on occasion; Phil even played bass while Norm and Dan played guitar and Jon sang; everyone participated in group vocals as needed. Though Dan was the primary frontman for the band on stage, its ability to effectively and frequently change focal points and configurations was well-suited to the broad songwriting ambitions of the Coles, who were responsible for almost all of the band's material.

At Woodstock, they played the main festival stage on Saturday.

Jon Cole left several months after the album release to pursue other production projects in which he had an interest. With the assistance of New York producer Tony Bongiovi, the other four members composed enough material to produce and record a second album for Cotillion, but which the label chose not to release. The remaining four disbanded Quill late in the spring of 1970.

Jon Cole spent a couple of years more in the music world, associated with Andy Pratt (known for his hit "Avenging Annie") and Jimmy Thompson, a popular singer-songwriter/guitarist from Boston. He went on to form Mechania, a groundbreaking company focused on teaching customers how to fix their own cars and later moved to Hawaii where he became an expert in off-grid power alternatives. Cole now heads a company, Light on the Earth Systems, devoted to the spread and worldwide adoption of solar power.

Dan Cole later ran Intermedia Sound Studios. He also produced many local acts and multimedia soundtracks, including that of the first US laser light show, Lovelight, which had a long, successful run at Boston's Hayden Planetarium. Cole arranged, through Michael Lang, then Joe Cocker's manager, for the American Standard Band to become Joe's band for a series of international tours and one album. He signed an independent production agreement in 1979 with Island Records to produce ASB, who recorded two records with Island. In the early 1980s, Dan Cole left the music business to pursue a career in the high-tech production hardware/software business, spending 12 years with Sony Professional Products Group. He left the corporate world to become a private investor and management consultant, and he still writes and produces his own material in his digital studio and is currently working on an album for general release.

After Quill disbanded, Roger North had a run as the drummer for the popular folk artist Odetta and then ended up joining the post-Easy Rider version of Holy Modal Rounders, moving to Oregon with Steve Weber and the rest of the band (save Peter Stampfel, who remained in New York). He continued to perform with the HMR well into the 1980s, although he missed the opportunity to record with the band on what may be one of their best remembered efforts, Have Moicy!, a 1975 collaboration with Michael Hurley and Jeffrey Fredrick and the Clamtones. Roger went on to design the unique North Drums, still favored by some drummers lucky enough to have purchased a kit. He currently lives in Portland, Oregon and plays in the Freak Mountain Ramblers. Phil Thayer still plays locally in Deltona, Florida.

== Members ==
- Dan Cole (born 1949 in Boston, Massachusetts, US) – lead vocals
- Jon Cole (born 1947 in Boston, Massachusetts, USA) – bass guitar
- Roger North – drums
- Norm Rogers (born April 21, 1943 in Ottawa, Canada - died July 9, 2011) – guitar
- Phil Thayer – keyboards

== Discography ==
- Quill (1970)
