= High Flying Bird (song) =

Single by Judy Henske
- A-side: "Charlotte Town"
- Released: December 1963
- Recorded: 1963
- Genre: Contemporary folk, folk-rock
- Length: 2:55
- Label: Elektra
- Songwriter: Billy Edd Wheeler
- Producer: Jac Holzman

Judy Henske singles chronology
"I Know You Rider" (1963)	"High Flying Bird" (1963)	"Till the Real Thing Comes Along" (1964)

"High Flying Bird" (sometimes "High Flyin' Bird") is a song written by American folk and country singer-songwriter Billy Edd Wheeler, and first recorded by Judy Henske in 1963. It was performed and recorded by many musicians and groups in the mid and late 1960s, and was influential on the folk rock genre.

== Recordings and notable performances ==
The song's first published recording was by Judy Henske, as the B-side of her late 1963 Elektra single "Charlotte Town", and then as the title track of her second album in 1964. Critic Richie Unterberger described the song as having "an arresting minor-key melody and brooding lyrics contrasting the freedom of a bird to the singer's earthbound misery." Henske's powerful vocal was supported by acoustic guitarist John Forsha, electric guitarist Jack Marshall, Bill Montgomery on bass, and drummer Earl Palmer. Forsha reported that Henske learned the song from Wheeler, although Wheeler did not release his own version until 1967, on his album Paper Birds. Forsha said of Henske's version: "the song could be called folk-rock although that wasn't our intent. We took a country-folk song, head-arranged it, and gave it to a jazz combo." Unterberger describes Henske's recording as "incredibly influential".

The song was recorded by several other influential musicians and bands in the mid and late 1960s, some of whom amended the lyrics to place greater emphasis on the freedom of the flying bird. Recordings included those by the Au Go Go Singers featuring then-19-year-old Stephen Stills, on the 1964 album They Call Us Au Go-Go Singers; Carolyn Hester on her 1965 album At Town Hall, One; The New Christy Minstrels on their 1966 album New Kick!; and Richie Havens on his 1967 album Mixed Bag. Havens performed the song at the Woodstock Festival in 1969. The song was also recorded by We Five with the only vocal by their lead singer Beverly Bivens on their 1967 album Make Someone Happy. It was recorded by Zephyr on their third album Sunset Ride (1972), sung by Candy Givens.

Psychedelic band Jefferson Airplane recorded the track at one of their first recording sessions in December 1965; it was eventually released in 1974 as part of the Early Flight album. The band also played the song at the Monterey Pop Festival in June 1967, and their performance was included in the film Monterey Pop. Other notable versions of the song were recorded by rock band H. P. Lovecraft on their 1968 album H. P. Lovecraft II; by Boston-based psychedelic rock outfit Ill Wind on their only album Flashes in 1968; by guitarist Isaac Guillory on his 1988 album Live; and by Neil Young & Crazy Horse on their 2012 album Americana.

== Influence ==
The title of the song influenced the name of Noel Gallagher's High Flying Birds. Gallagher was listening to the song, which appeared on Jefferson Airplane's Early Flight, when he decided to "borrow" the title.
