= The Pied Piper (song) =

Single by Crispian St. Peters

from the album Follow Me...
- B-side: "Sweet Dawn My True Love"
- Released: April 1966
- Genre: Pop rock
- Length: 2:30
- Label: Decca 12359 (UK); Jamie 1320 (US); London 2512 (Canada)
- Songwriters: Steve Duboff, Artie Kornfeld
- Producer: David Nicolson

Crispian St. Peters singles chronology
"You Were on My Mind" (1965)	"The Pied Piper" (1966)	"Changes" (1966)

"The Pied Piper" is a pop song written by the American song-writing and performing duo The Changin' Times, consisting of Steve Duboff and Artie Kornfeld, who first recorded it in 1965. Their version reached #87 on the Billboard Hot 100. However, when British pop singer Crispian St. Peters recorded it, he scored a major hit during the summer of 1966. It went to #4 in the United States, #5 in the United Kingdom, and #1 in Canada.

The song's title refers to a fairy tale from German folklore, the titular character of which is The Pied Piper of Hamelin.

== Charts ==
=== Weekly charts ===
Chart (1966)	Peak position
Australia (Kent Music Report)	5
Belgium (Ultratop 50 Flanders)	2
Belgium (Ultratop 50 Wallonia)	18
Canada (RPM)	1
Ireland (RTÉ)	9
Malaysia (Radio Malaysia)	2
Netherlands (Dutch Top 40)	2
Netherlands (Single Top 100)	4
New Zealand (Listener)	2
Singapore (Radio Singapore)	8
South Africa (Springbok Radio)	1
Rhodesia (Lyons Maid)	1
UK (Disc and Music Echo)	5
UK (Melody Maker)	5
UK (New Musical Express)	5
UK (Record Retailer)	5
US Billboard Hot 100	4
US Cash Box Top 100	4
US Record World 100 Top Pops]]	2
West Germany (Media Control)	11

=== Year-end charts ===
Chart (1966)	Peak position
Belgium (Ultratop 50 Flanders)	25
Netherlands (Dutch Top 40)	21
UK (Record Retailer)	60
US Billboard Hot 100	63
US Cash Box Top 100	68

== Later uses ==
An advertisement for the first-generation Toyota Echo in Australia and New Zealand.

The song has been used in three episodes of the HBO series Silicon Valley, where it is sung karaoke by Dinesh.

== Other versions ==
- In Italy a well-known cover version was made, with the title "Bandiera gialla" ("Yellow Flag"), sung by Gianni Pettenati and becoming the theme song of a popular radio program of that era targeted to young people.
- Cher covered the song on her 1966 self-titled album.
- French singer Sheila covered the song in French, with the title "Le pipeau", in 1966.
- Rita Marley covered the song in 1967.
- Jamaican reggae duo Bob and Marcia had a Top 20 hit with their version, taking the song to UK #11 in July 1971.
- Yugoslav rock band S.T.R.A.H. released a Serbo-Croatian language garage rock cover entitled "Vođa" ("The Leader") on their 1988 EP Mesec (The Moon).
