= Bob cut =

Hairstyle

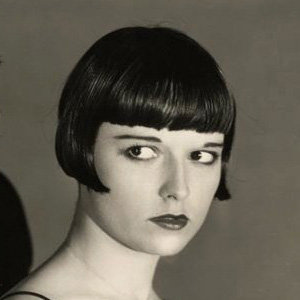
Louise Brooks styling a "shingle" bob cut in 1929

A bob cut, also known as a bob, is a short to medium length haircut, in which the hair is typically cut straight around the head at approximately jaw level, and no longer than shoulder-length, often with a fringe at the front. The standard bob cut exposes the back of the neck and keeps all of the hair well above the shoulders.

== History ==
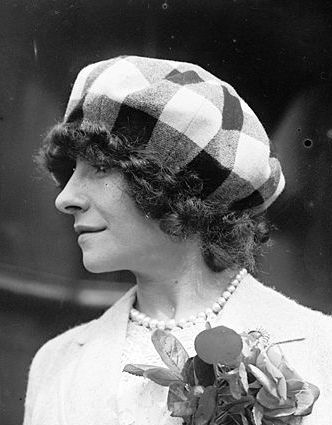
Polaire in 1910

Historically, women in the West have usually worn their hair long. Some young girls, actresses and a few "advanced" or fashionable women had worn short hair even before World War I, such as French actress Polaire, described in 1910 as having "a shock of short, dark hair", a cut she adopted in the early 1890s. The style, however, was not considered generally respectable until given impetus by the inconvenience of long hair to girls engaged in war work.

In 1909, Antoni Cierplikowski, called Antoine de Paris, a Polish hairdresser who became the world's first celebrity hairdresser, started a fashion for a short bob cut. He said it was inspired by accounts of Joan of Arc. In the 1920s, he introduced the “shingle cut”, which became popular with daring young women—the Bloomsbury set and flappers. Among his clients were world-famous female figures such as Coco Chanel, Queen Marie of Romania, Sarah Bernhardt, Greta Garbo, U.S. First Lady Eleanor Roosevelt and Brigitte Bardot.

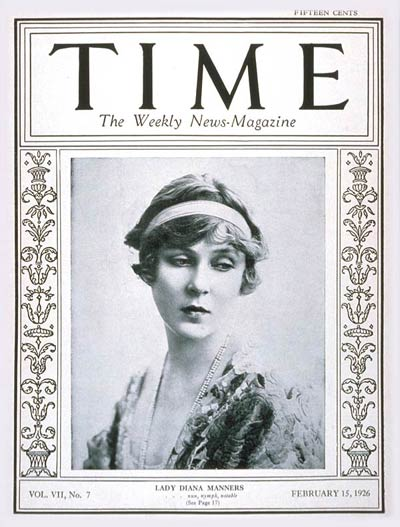
Lady Diana Cooper, Time (15 February 1926)

English society beauty Lady Diana Cooper wore bobbed hair from childhood through adulthood. It has been said that renowned dancer and fashion trendsetter Irene Castle introduced her "Castle bob" to a receptive American audience in 1915, and by 1920 the style was rapidly becoming fashionable. However, it was artist and illustrator Clara Tice who was the first public person who used it the United States. Popularized by film star Mary Thurman in the early 1920s and by Colleen Moore and Louise Brooks in the mid to late 1920s, it was still seen as a somewhat shocking statement of independence in the young women known as flappers, as older people were used to seeing girls wearing long dresses and heavy Edwardian-style hair. Hairdressers, whose training was mainly in arranging and curling long hair, were slow to realise that short styles for women had arrived to stay, and so barbers in many cities found lines of women outside their shops, waiting to be shorn of hair that had taken many years to grow.

Although as early as 1922 the fashion correspondent of The Times was suggesting that bobbed hair was passé, by the mid-1920s the style (in various versions, often worn with a side-parting, curled or waved, and with the hair at the nape of the neck "shingled" short), was the dominant female hairstyle in the Western world. The style was spreading even beyond the West, as women who rejected traditional roles adopted the bob cut as a sign of modernity. Close-fitting cloche hats had also become very popular, and could not be worn with long hair. Well-known bob-wearers were actresses Clara Bow and Joan Crawford, as well as Dutch film star Truus van Aalten.

As the 1930s approached, women started to grow their hair longer, and the sharp lines of the bob were abandoned.

=== 1960s and beyond ===
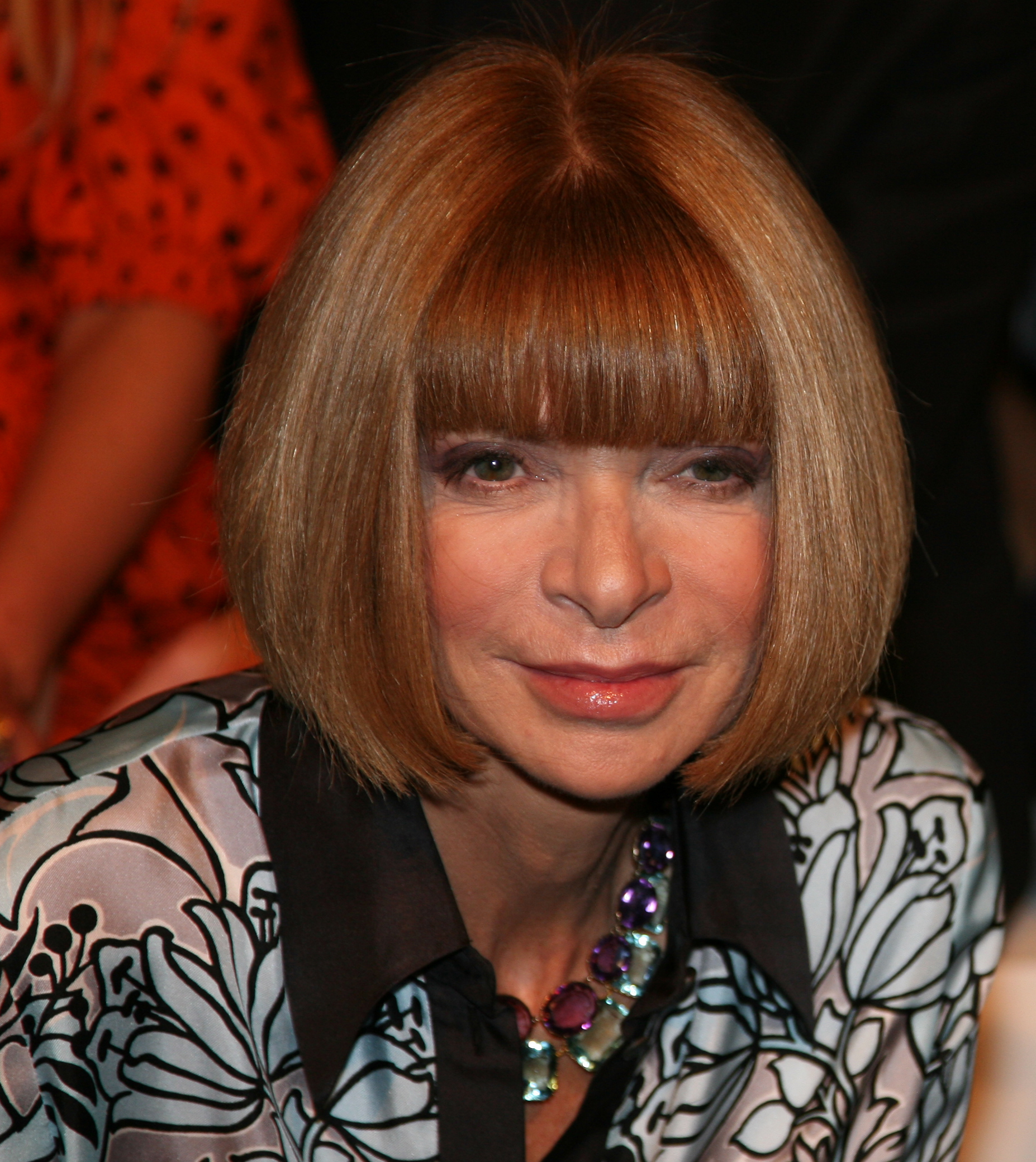
Anna Wintour with a bob haircut and a fringe/bangs

In the mid-1960s, Vidal Sassoon made it popular again, using the shape of the early bob and making it more stylish in a simpler cut. Its resurgence coincided with the arrival of the "mop top" Beatle cut for men. Those associated with the bob at that time included fashion designers Mary Quant and Jean Muir; actresses Nancy Kwan, Carolyn Jones, Barbara Feldon, Georgina Ward and Amanda Barrie; and singers as diverse as Keely Smith, Cilla Black, Billie Davis, Juliette Gréco, Mireille Mathieu and Beverly Bivens of the American group We Five. Valentina, the transgressively erotic heroine of a surreal Italian comic strip series created by Guido Crepax in 1965, sported an iconic bob inspired by actress Louise Brooks (as well as by Crepax's own wife Luisa). The bob cut was also popular with African Americans in the mid-to-late 1960s, reflected in such singing groups as Diana Ross & The Supremes and The Marvelettes.

Many styles and combinations of the "bob" have evolved since. In the late 1980s, Siouxsie Sioux, lead singer of Siouxsie and the Banshees, and Corinne Drewery, singer of Swing Out Sister, had bob cuts for a short time. Actress Melanie Griffith's character Audrey "Lulu" Hankel wore a bob wig for much of the runtime of the 1986 comedy-thriller film Something Wild. Singer Linda Ronstadt sported a very "Louise Brooks" inspired bob on the cover of two Grammy award winning albums in the late 1980s: 1987's Trio album with Dolly Parton and Emmylou Harris and her 1989 release Cry Like A Rainstorm, Howl Like The Wind. She also wears the cut in the video for her duet with James Ingram, "Somewhere Out There". Annie Potts made an appearance in the 1989 supernatural comedy film Ghostbusters II with a bob as she reprised her role as Janine Melnitz. Phoebe Cates's character Elizabeth in the 1991 black comedy film Drop Dead Fred got a bob haircut after getting part of her long black hair cut off. Anna Wintour, editor-in-chief of American Vogue since 1988, apparently had hers trimmed every day (Times 2, 10 July 2006). In the early 1990s Cyndi Lauper had a bob haircut with very unusual colors; soon afterward, the cut became identified with Uma Thurman's character of Mia Wallace in Quentin Tarantino's 1994 film Pulp Fiction. The bob went into hibernation, but eventually became popular again. Natalie Portman sported a bob haircut in the 1994 English-language French action-thriller film Leon: The Professional for her portrayal of her character Mathilda. T-Boz of TLC also had a bob haircut with very unusual colors that was asymmetrical with bangs. Also, for the first two seasons and the first two episodes of the third season of Lois and Clark: The New Adventures of Superman, the character of Lois Lane (Teri Hatcher) had a trademark bob haircut. The character of Dr. Laurel Weaver (Linda Fiorentino) from Barry Sonnenfeld's 1997 film Men in Black also sported a bob. Julianne Moore had a bob in the 1998 film The Big Lebowski for her portrayal of Maude Lebowski. Katie Volding, who played Benjamin “Ben” Cooper's little sister Angie in the 1999 Disney Channel TV movie Smart House, had a bob haircut.

=== 2000s revival ===
Rear view of the bob haircut

In 2006, the bob was adopted by Madonna and, as a move away from boho-chic, by actress Sienna Miller.

In November 2005, Canadian ice dancer Kristina Lenko was asked to join ITV1's new series, Dancing on Ice. She went to her stylist in Toronto and told him "Do whatever you like." He cut Lenko's waist-length hair into what is referred to as an A-line bob, where the hair is shorter in the back and gradually longer toward the front, with the longest pieces toward the front of the face. Later, ex–Spice Girl Victoria Beckham decided to cut her own hair into such a style, helping to raise its popularity worldwide with girls asking hairdressers for a "Pob"—Beckham's nickname Posh Spice conflated with "bob".

In 2007, Rihanna had a bob haircut in the video for "Umbrella". She has said that she was inspired by actress Charlize Theron in Æon Flux. Keira Knightley had a bob in her short TV ad for Coco Mademoiselle. Actress Christina Ricci also had a bob for live-action movie version for 60s anime series Speed Racer and later. Katie Holmes got a bob cut with bangs in 2007.

Jenny McCarthy is known for a sporting an A-line bob. Bryce Dallas Howard's character Claire Dearing sported an A-line bob in the 2015 film Jurassic World. Kate Bosworth is said to have popularized the bob in 2008. Shoulder-length bobs became popular after being sported by stars such as Heidi Klum and Jessica Alba. A shaggy version of the bob was popularized by Dianna Agron and Kate Mara.

== Types ==
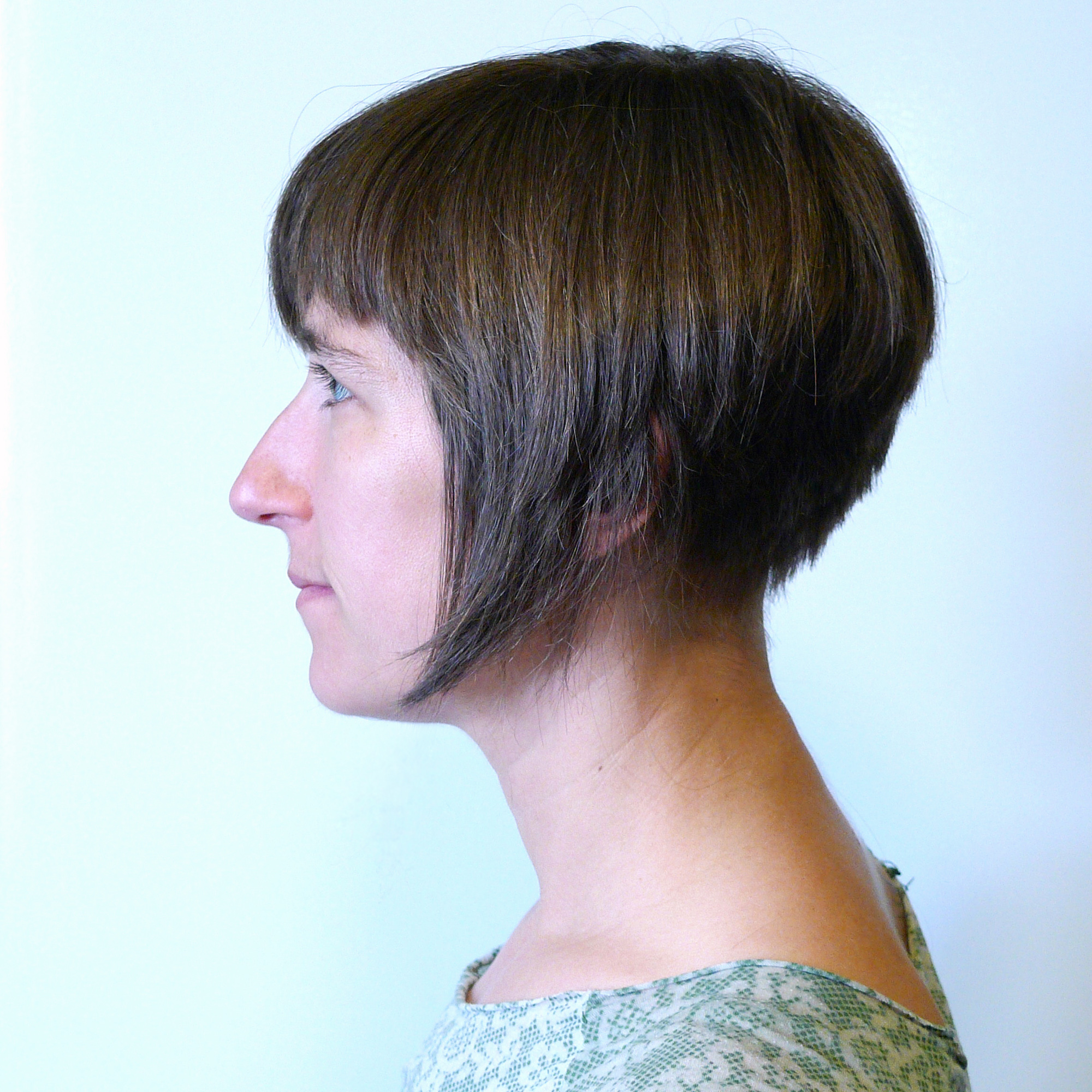
Inverted bob

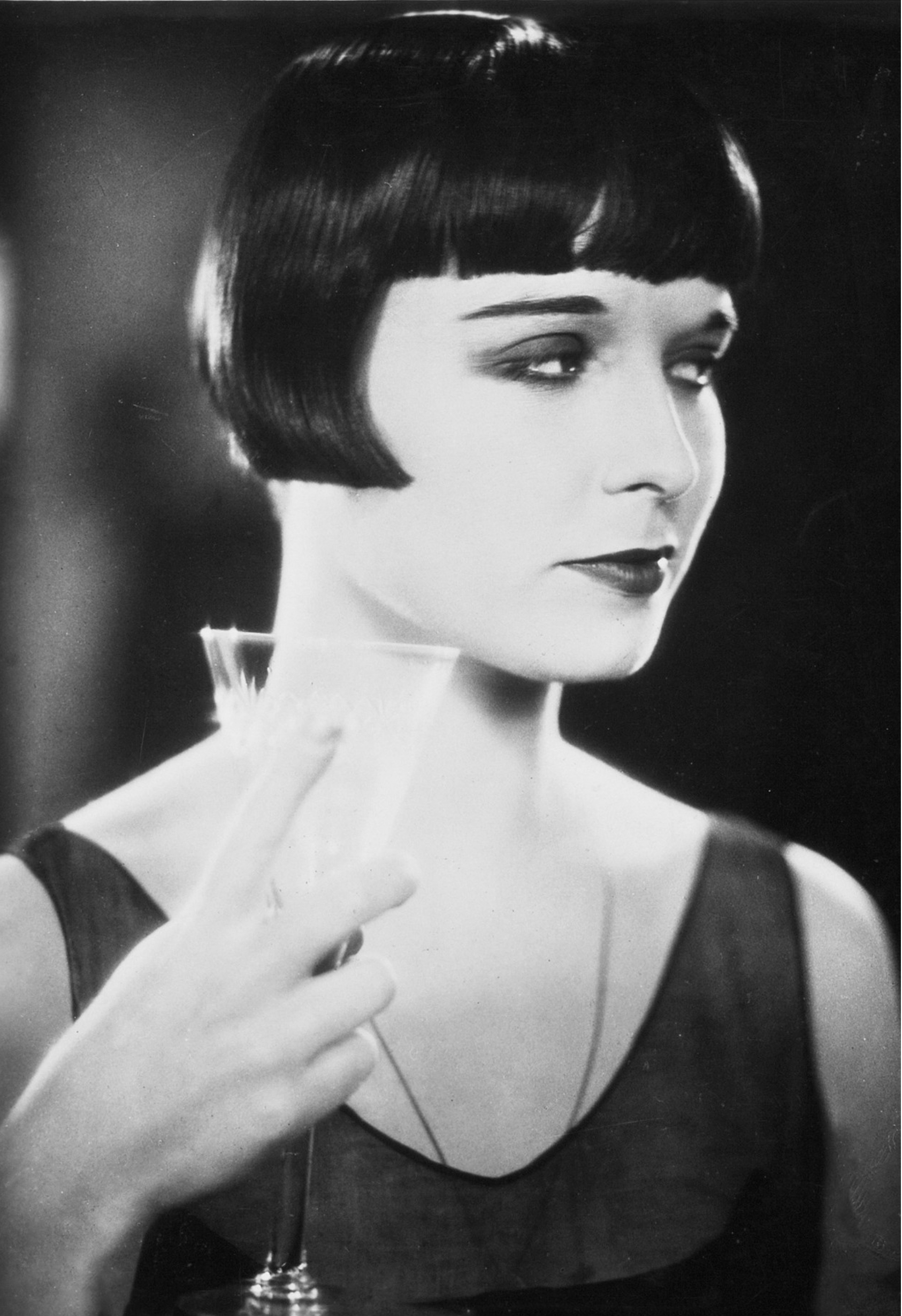
Shingle bob

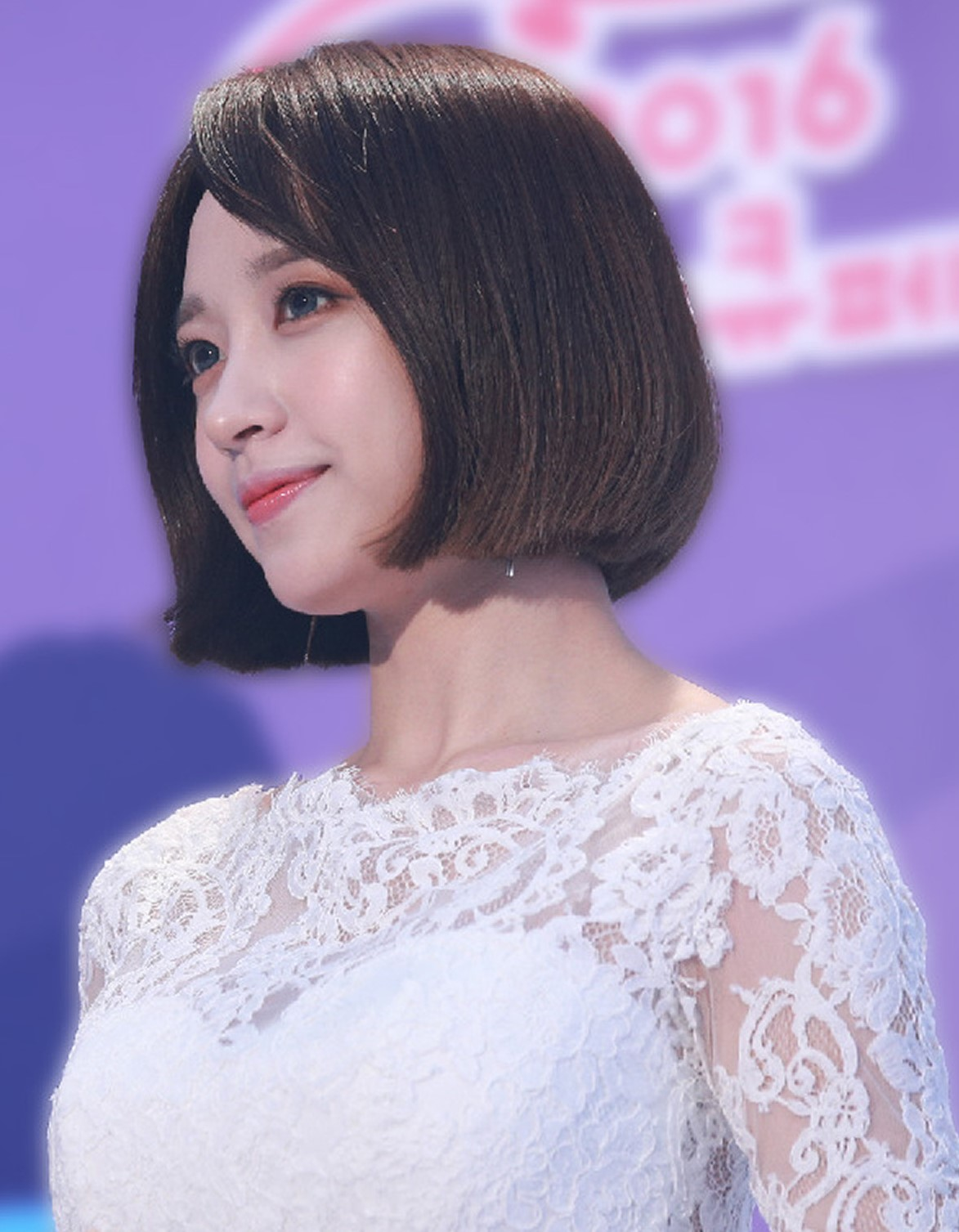
Chin-length bob
- A-line bob: A typical bob cut, with slightly longer hair in front that frames the face, typically curling under the chin.
- Buzz-cut bob: Where it is shoulder-length in the front and close-cropped at the back.
- Chin-length bob: Cut straight to the chin, with or without bangs.
- French bob: Shorter type of bob.
- Inverted bob: Similar to an A-line bob, but with stacked layers in the back. The perimeter of the cut is curved rather than being a straight line. This cut is also commonly called a "graduated bob".
- Shaggy bob: A messy bob layered with a razor.
- Shingle bob: a cut that is tapered very short in the back, exposing the hairline at the neck. The hair on the sides is formed into a single curl or point on each cheek.
- Shoulder-length bob: A blunt bob that reaches the shoulders and has very few layers.

== See also ==
- List of hairstyles
- Butterfly haircut
- "Bernice Bobs Her Hair", a 1920 short story by F. Scott Fitzgerald on the subject.
- Bobby pin
- Karen (slang), a pejorative slang term associated with a stereotypical 21st-century woman with a bob
- Lob cut
- Pageboy, a similar hairstyle, usually a bit longer than a bob
