= Djerf =

Djerf is a surname. Notable people with the surname include:

- Lise-Lotte Djerf (born 1963), Swedish archer
- Matilda Djerf (born 1997), Swedish fashion designer
- Rasmus Djerf (born 1993), Swedish ice hockey player
- Richard Djerf (1969–2025), American mass murderer
