= Follow Me... =

Studio album by Crispian St. Peters
- Released: July 22, 1966
- Genres: Folk rock, pop rock, beat
- Length: 39:57
- Label: Decca
- Producer: David Nicolson

Crispian St. Peters chronology
Follow Me... (1966)	Simply (1970)

Singles from Follow Me...
- 1. "You Were on My Mind"/"What I'm Gonna Be" Released: November 19, 1965; 2. "The Pied Piper"/"Sweet Dawn My True Love" Released: March 18, 1966; 3. "But She's Untrue"/"Your Ever Changin' Mind" Released: November 26, 1966; 4. "So Long"/"My Little Brown Eyes" Released: August 1970

Professional ratings
Review scores
Source	Rating
Allmusic	3.5/5 stars

Follow Me... is the debut album by Crispian St. Peters and was released on July 22, 1966.

The album featured four singles: "You Were on My Mind", which reached number 2 in the UK and number 36 on the American Billboard Hot 100, "The Pied Piper", which reached number 4 in the UK and number 5 in the US, "But She's Untrue", whose B-side, "Your Ever Changin' Mind", reached number 106 in the US, and "So Long", which did not chart. The song "You Were on My Mind" was originally recorded and released in 1964 by Ian & Sylvia, and was a major hit in the US when covered by the group We Five in 1965.

== Reception ==
Bruce Eder of Allmusic has characterized the album as "strangely inconsistent, crossing between upbeat folk-rock and brooding ballads", also noting the inconsistencies in St. Peters' vocal delivery.

== Track listing ==
All songs written and composed by Crispian St. Peters except where noted.

1. "Your Love Has Gone" – 3:41
2. "Jilly Honey" – 2:16
3. "When We Meet" – 3:33
4. "My Little Brown Eyes" – 2:45
5. "It's a Funny Feeling" – 1:53
6. "So Long" – 3:31
7. "You Were on My Mind" (Sylvia Fricker) – 2:43
8. "But She's Untrue" – 3:09
9. "Goodbye to You" – 2:41
10. "Willingly" – 3:45
11. "Without You" – 2:19
12. "That's the Way I Feel" – 2:22
13. "That Little Chain" – 2:36
14. "The Pied Piper" (Steve Duboff, Artie Kornfeld) – 2:33

== Personnel ==
=== Musicians ===
- Crispian St. Peters – guitar, vocals
- Alan Parker – guitar
- Big Jim Sullivan – guitar
- Dan Sandford – guitar
- Jimmy Page – guitar
- Vic Flick – guitar
- Harry Stoneham – piano, organ
- Ronnie Seabrook – bass
- Russ Stableford – bass
- Rex Bennett – drums
- Jim Lawless – percussion
- Eddie Mordue – piccolo, flute
- Don Honeywill – saxophone

=== Technical ===
- David Nicolson – producer
- Gerald Chevin – engineer
- Roger Cameron – engineer
- Tony Pike – engineer (track 6)
- Barrie Wentzell – photography
- Kit Wells – liner notes

== Charts ==
=== Singles ===
Year	Single	Country	Chart	Position
1965	"You Were on My Mind"	US	Billboard Hot 100	36
1965	"You Were on My Mind"	UK	Official Charts	2
1965	"You Were on My Mind"	AUS	Kent Music Report	45
1966	"The Pied Piper"	US	Billboard Hot 100	4
1966	"The Pied Piper"	UK	Official Charts	5
1966	"The Pied Piper"	AUS	Kent Music Report	5
1966	"The Pied Piper"	CAN	RPM Magazine	1
1966	"But She's Untrue"	AUS	Kent Music Report	33
1966	"Your Ever Changin' Mind"	US	Billboard Hot 100	106
