= Honey in the Rock =

Honey in the Rock may refer to:

- Honey in the Rock (play), a 1961 outdoor musical-drama by American playwright Kermit Hunter and composer Jack Kilpatrick
- Honey in the Rock (album), a 1973 album by Charlie Daniels
- "Honey in the Rock" (song), a 2022 song by Brooke Ligertwood and Brandon Lake
- "Honey in the Rock", a 1950 gospel song by The Blind Boys of Alabama
- Sweet Honey in the Rock, an all-woman, African American a cappella group
