= Beverly Bivens =

American singer (born 1946)

Bev Bivens
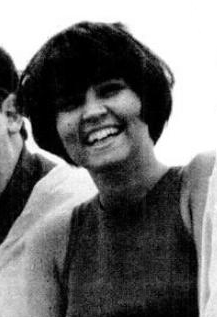
- Bivens in 1966

Background information
- Born: Beverly Ann Bivens; April 28, 1946 (age 80); Santa Ana, California, U.S.
- Genres: Folk rock, avant-garde jazz
- Occupation: Singer
- Years active: Mid to late 1960s
- Label: A&M

Beverly (Bev) Ann Bivens (born April 28, 1946 in Santa Ana, California) is the American former lead singer of the West Coast folk rock group We Five from 1965 to 1967. Since 2021 she has been the original band's last surviving member. After her marriage to jazz musician Fred Marshall and the break-up of We Five, she sang for a while with the experimental Light Sound Dimension, but by the late 1960s Bivens had largely left the music scene. After many years of relative seclusion, she sang at the opening of an exhibition in San Francisco in 2009. Her son is the saxophonist Joshi Marshall.

== Early years ==
Beverly Bivens attended Santa Ana High School, where she was a direct contemporary of actress Diane Keaton, and Orange Coast Junior College.

== Mid 1960s: We Five ==
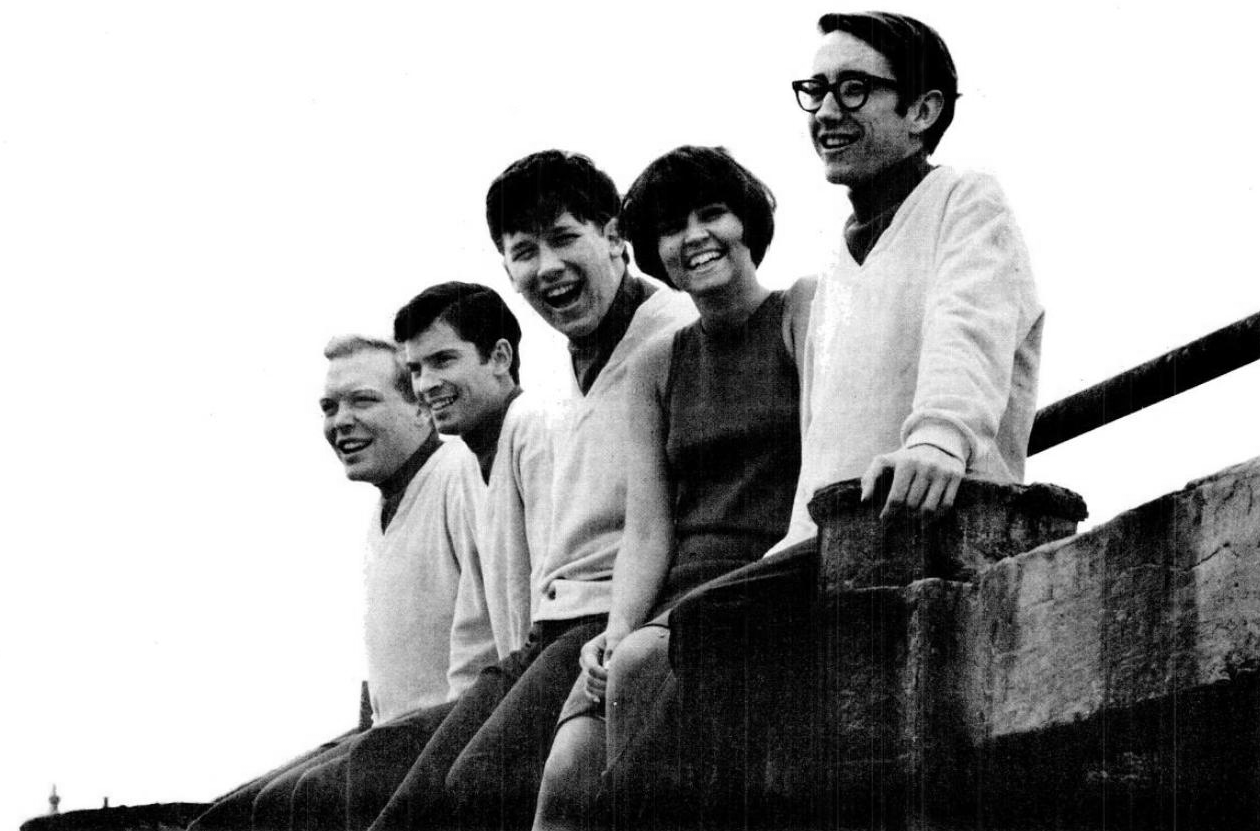
Bivens (second from right) with We Five, 1966

With the encouragement of her mother, Bivens had developed her singing voice as a child. Around 1963–64, she began performing with Mike Stewart (1945–2002) and William Jerome (Jerry) Burgan (1945–2021), who had formed a folk duo at high school and branched out into electronic music with guitarist Bob Jones (1947–2013), whom they met at the University of San Francisco. She had been recommended to Mike Stewart by Terry Kirkman, later of The Association, who was then the boyfriend of her sister Barbara. Contrary to popular belief, she did not perform backup vocals with Glen Campbell, who also played banjo, on "Desert Pete", a recording by The Kingston Trio, of which Stewart's brother John (1939–2008) was a member. The backup vocals on “Desert Pete” were performed by Sue Ellen Davies, who originally performed with The Ridgerunners but left the band after discovering she was pregnant, and was subsequently replaced by Bivens. With the addition of Pete Fullerton, the new group, initially called the Ridgerunners and for a while the Mike Stewart Quintet, became known as We Five. They recorded their first album, the highly eclectic You Were on My Mind, for A&M records in 1965 after Herb Alpert, founder of A&M, heard them at the "hungry i", a folk/night club on Jackson Street in the North Beach area of San Francisco.

=== You Were on My Mind ===
We Five's first single, from their debut album of the same name, was a reworked version of Sylvia Tyson's song "You Were On My Mind". It became one of the first folk-rock hits, reaching number three in the Billboard "Hot 100" in August 1965. Tyson (then Sylvia Fricker) says that she was unaware that her song had been covered until she heard We Five's version on a car radio while driving on Highway 101 in California. One consequence of We Five's success was that Tyson's song, which until then had been unavailable in sheet form, was published by Witmark of New York with a photograph of Bivens and We Five on the cover. However, with the British Invasion at its height, We Five's recording had only limited international success, having been covered reluctantly though successfully in Britain by Crispian St. Peters.

On October 2, 1965, We Five performed You Were on My Mind live on the ABC television show The Hollywood Palace, on which they were introduced by guest compère Fred Astaire. Video footage of this performance survives, as does that of appearances around the same time on the Jack Benny and Bob Hope shows and Shivaree. There have been some claims that Bivens did not sing on the original studio recording of You Were on My Mind and that the female voice was that of another artist. However, most sources, including We Five's Jerry Burgan in his 2014 memoir, have rejected this suggestion.

=== Subsequent singles ===
A subsequent 1965 single, Chet Powers's (aka Dino Valenti) "Let's Get Together", was a more modest commercial success, reaching number 31 on the Hot 100. The song, which had been recorded in 1964 by The Kingston Trio, became a much bigger hit in 1969 for the Youngbloods under the shortened title Get Together.

A third single, You Let a Love Burn Out, was trailed by A&M as a "3rd We Five smash in a row" on the back of a Grammy nomination for You Were on My Mind. Released early in 1966, its "twangy-oriental sound", with Bivens "really put[ting] her voice in front of the others and set[ting] the tempo for the remainder of the group" represented a significant departure of style that in various ways was to be adopted by other bands in the coming year. However, it had limited public impact, a fate shared in May 1966 by a further single, There Stands the Door (which was coupled with Somewhere, a song from the 1957 musical West Side Story). Pete Fullerton felt that with both these recordings "there was always that edge of whining".

== Influence and style ==
Bivens' voice gave We Five its distinctive and memorable sound. Almost operatic in quality, its range was described as low tenor to high soprano. Bob Jones has recalled that "Bev had this husky kind of voice, and somehow there's this old soul in there".

Bivens' performances on the album You Were On My Mind and in concert largely foreshadowed a female vocal style that by 1967 was associated with, among others, Elaine "Spanky" McFarlane, Grace Slick of the Great Society and Jefferson Airplane, and Cass Elliot and Michelle Phillips of The Mamas & the Papas. Bivens was said to have inspired Jefferson Airplane's original vocalist Signe Toly Anderson, who was already well established on San Francisco's jazz and folk scene before joining the Airplane, originally a folk-rock band, in 1965. It may be no coincidence either that Karen Carpenter, who like Bivens had a fine vocal range, was signed by Alpert to A&M with her brother Richard in 1969.

Bivens' influence was apparent too in recordings by some male bands: for example, the Turtles' single Happy Together and the Cowsills' The Rain, the Park and Other Things (both major hits in 1967). In 2002, the British newspaper The Independent described We Five as having "bridged the gap" between Peter, Paul and Mary and the Mamas and Papas; indeed, Bivens' voice and that of Mary Travers had a similar atmospheric quality, although Bivens' was the more commanding. In the latter respect. There was also a similarity with both Judith Durham of the Australian group the Seekers and Dusty Springfield, initially of the Springfields, who made their names in England in the early to mid-1960s as the lead singers of folk-oriented groups. Others whose vocal delivery has borne comparison have included in the 1960s Judy Dyble (the original lead singer of England's premier folk-rock band, Fairport Convention), Kerrilee Male and Dorris Henderson (successive lead singers of Eclection), and more recently Lavinia Blackwall of Trembling Bells and Zooey Deschanel in her recordings with M. Ward as She & Him. Jerry Burgan has also cited Stevie Nicks of the Anglo-American band Fleetwood Mac.

=== Personal interests and images ===
In 1965 Bivens' personal interests were said to be fashions, Chinese food and freedom. As regards fashion, photographs show her wearing dresses whose hemlines were well above the knee in 1965, at a time when the mini-skirt, which in England became a defining symbol of "Swinging" London, had yet to make a wide impact in America. Bivens was then 5 foot 3 inches tall, with brown hair and hazel eyes. Musicologist Alec Palao has described her as "a petite powerhouse with demurely attractive looks [and] a penchant for European style". Surviving television clips capture her rather chic mod style of dress, with bobbed hair and go-go boots. She was sometimes mistaken for the actress Barbara Feldon, co-star of the television series Get Smart, who also had a bob. Bivens' relatively brief career covered a period in which she was one of a fairly small number of female rock musicians: her classic style, at least until 1966, was in contrast to the more Bohemian look favored by contemporaries like Grace Slick or Janis Joplin.

At that time Bivens' favorite band was the Beatles, "... which is fairly obvious. I haven't really heard any that I really like besides the Beatles". Many years later, she recalled that when We Five played in Pittsburgh in late 1965 with another English band, the Rolling Stones, she had been ignored by the Stones' lead singer Mick Jagger when she had tried to introduce herself. Jerry Burgan recalled that she was shunned also by Jagger's fellow band-member Brian Jones. On another occasion, Bivens defended Peter Noone, the young lead singer of Herman's Hermits, whose apparent lack of self-control was criticized by other members of We Five, pointing out that he was only seventeen and was not in her view being managed properly.

In October 1965 KYA, a leading San Francisco radio station, used a large photographic portrait of Bivens to draw attention to its inaugural International Pop Music Awards (with the caption, "Wee One of the We Five"). Other photographs of Bivens included those of We Five taken by Lisa Bachelis (later Lisa Law), using a Leica given to her by the group's manager and producer Frank Werber (1929–2007), who also managed The Kingston Trio. We Five sometimes used Werber's home at Mill Valley to rehearse; one photograph taken there shows Bivens barefoot in a bikini top and jeans, while the group used among other things a broom in place of a microphone. Bivens appeared barefoot also on the cover of You Were On My Mind, walking along a beach in a reddish-orange tunic, accompanied by her male colleagues, all fully shod and wearing matching turtlenecks. Bivens enjoyed sunbathing: she was once admitted to hospital on tour with second degree burns after Burgan, who had been called to her room, found her in considerable pain, wearing only the lower half of a bikini.

== 1966–67: Split of We Five ==
We Five were in the vanguard of the San Francisco bands, including Jefferson Airplane and the Grateful Dead, that reached international prominence in the "Summer of Love" of 1967. However, the original band had disbanded by then. Jerry Burgan and Pete Fullerton reformed We Five. Burgan's wife, Debbie, née Graf, who sang with a group called the Legendaires and had sometimes worked with the Ridgerunners (as they then were), took over from Bivens as lead vocalist. A group known as We Five was still performing forty years later.

In his notes for We Five's second album, Make Someone Happy (1967), released after they had split (an episode that later give rise to unfounded rumours that Bivens had been killed in a road accident), satirist George Yanok observed that

"We 5 was the first "electric band" to come out of San Francisco. It predated the entire present "happening" in the Haight-Ashbury [a district of San Francisco that became the centre of "flower power"] with all its attendant trippery and hang-overs …".

Yanok asserted also that "there was nothing psychedelic or arcane about We 5's music". However, various elements of the music of the psychedelic era, notably Bivens' vocal delivery, which Yanok described as "a major reason for this [We Five's] special something", were plainly discernible in We Five's output (for example, on Let's Get Together and such tracks as If I Were Alone, Love Me Not Tomorrow, You Let A Love Burn Out and Bivens' blues solo on Judy Henske's High Flying Bird, which she has described as "like her heart song").

=== Circumstances of the split ===
The precise reasons for the break-up of the original group remain unclear, although speculation has tended to focus on Bivens. Jerry Burgan recalled that, among a number of complicating factors, some of band members, notably Mike Stewart, were "frankly in love" with her and has referred to, in his words, "an instinctive caution innate either to Beverly or to young women generally [in the mid 1960s] whose ties to social tradition were all about to unravel". The official website of the latter-day We Five explained that "Beverly turned her back on stardom to marry ... [to] explore experimental music, and become a mom". A year before her marriage, she had described touring without her boyfriend as "a big drag" and has since reflected that, by the time of the split, she was "kinda dancing" and that her husband was having an influence on her. However, there have been suggestions that differences within the group and aspects of its management were also factors. Bivens was not the only member of We Five who abandoned a performing career prematurely. Peter Fullerton left the music business altogether around 1970 to work with homeless people in the Bay Area and much later put out two albums of mostly religious music to benefit his charity, the "Truck of Love."

Despite her undoubted magnetism and the powerful effect she seems to have had on her colleagues, Bivens was, in some respects, an "outsider". She was the only female member of We Five, while the four men all went to college together: Stewart, Jones and Burgan were graduates of the University of San Francisco, and Fullerton knew Stewart and Burgan from their days at a junior college in Los Angeles County, Mt. San Antonio College. The academic background of each was recorded prominently on the sleeve of You Were On My Mind, together with the information that Bivens had attended junior college. There were other mild hints of condescension: the same sleeve notes recognised that Bivens' "unusual brilliance and vocal range is the basis of our sound" and that she was "the spark of the group", but referred also to her "genuine involvement in singing and desire to learn", while, many years later, the We Five website referred to Stewart and Burgan's having added "the sound of a female voice that was eventually to be made famous by Beverly Bivens". (This is perhaps consistent with another sleeve reference to Bivens' instrument as her throat, although it may allude also to the Ridgerunners' original female singer, Sue Ellen Davies, a coloratura whom the other members had met at Claremont High.) More generally, it was, as critic Will Hodgkinson wrote after the death of Christine McVie in 2022, "a time when it was extremely hard for women to be taken seriously in rock".

=== Issues of achievement and management ===
The original We Five, and Bivens in particular, did not fulfill their potential during their rather short career. They were managed by Frank Werber, and the production of their recordings was handled by Werber's own company, Trident, rather than by A&M Records. In a 2002 Jerry Burgan attributed the band's collapse in part to the band's management, reflecting that "the dissolution was rooted in unfocused management that permitted a very young group to have too much autonomy. We factionalized into a blues contingent, a pop contingent, and an 'I'm out of here' contingent."

Despite Herb Alpert's own recording success, A&M was a rather small record label compared (for example) to RCA, who signed We Five's local contemporaries Jefferson Airplane. The band's success was greatly hindered by the fact that their second album, with Bivens as the lead singer, was not released until late 1967, over a year after it was recorded and six months after the band's final concert in May 1967 in Winona, Minnesota. In 1968 We Five were among a number of A&M's artists included in an injunction by a Los Angeles court prohibiting the "pirating" of their recordings by a company named Superba Tapes.

We Five are sometimes dismissed as a "one hit wonder", although they actually had two charting singles and were the highest charting 1960s band from San Francisco until Creedence Clearwater Revival in 1969. Jerry Burgan spoke more kindly of the band's management in 2007, recalling that Werber "had an ability to encourage creativity and the musical process without having to direct it. While encouraging us [We Five] to write, to sing, and to play, he surrounded us with a team that shaped all of the other elements which led to our success". However, there may be a certain implication in Burgan's further observation that "we were too young to see it at the time, but I later learned to appreciate the impact he had on my life". The 2009 compilation, There Stands the Door, to which all the surviving members of the original We Five contributed recollections, was dedicated to "the late, great Frank Werber".

=== Bivens in retrospect ===
The two albums featuring Bivens were re-released as a compilation compact disc by Collectors' Choice Music in 1996 and a further compilation, with some previously unreleased recordings, including jingles for Coca-Cola, was issued in 2009 by Big Beat under the title of There Stands The Door: The Best Of We Five. Because of her short period of contemporaneous fame, Bivens has remained a rather elusive figure, but one whose voice has plainly been cherished by many who heard her in the mid-1960s. Although Mike Stewart appears to have been the "engine" of We Five, putting in extra hours to attend to arrangements of the group's material, George Yanok's notes for Make Someone Happy were perhaps revealing in that they concentrated on Bivens' centrality to We Five virtually to the exclusion of the other members: according to Yanok, she was "totally honest, gifted and possessed". Yanok also observed that We Five's music was about "fun" and that it was "unfortunate that that 'fun', in this age [i.e. 1967], has become equated with frivolity and dismissed as trivia".

Bivens' documented recording career lasted less than two years and extended to little more than two dozen tracks. Bivens, "the miniskirt-wearing, free spirit of the band", was (like Bob Jones, who was also not part of the reformed We Five) "making individual plans of [her] own". She herself has said that "A&M called, they wanted me, but I think my husband [Fred Marshall, whom she married in 1966] insisted he produce the records ... I'd been working hard for a long time and just thought I'd take a break – turned out to be a couple of decades!"

== Late 1960s: Fred Marshall and the Light Sound Dimension ==
On February 13, 1966, at the age of 19, Bivens married jazz bassist Fred Marshall (Frederick Calvin Marshall, October 4, 1938 – November 14, 2001). Marshall had worked with a number of West Coast rock bands and been a member of the Vince Guaraldi Trio which famously recorded the incidental music for television specials based on the Peanuts cartoons of Charles Schulz. Guaraldi had been an habitué of the hungry i club and Marshall's own band, the Ensemble, played at the Fillmore Auditorium in San Francisco on the same bill as Jefferson Airplane on the night in October 1966 that Grace Slick first sang as their lead vocalist.

In 1966, Marshall began to collaborate with lighting technician Bill Ham (William Gatewood Ham, born September 26, 1932), who is generally credited with creating the first psychedelic light show, a concept that originated in the "beat" era of the 1950s and became a feature of many late 1960s rock concerts. Together with Jerry Granelli, who, in addition to playing on We Five's first album, had also worked with Guaraldi and been a close associate of the songwriter and producer Sly Stone, they formed the Light Sound Dimension (which, as with the Beatles' 1967 song Lucy in the Sky with Diamonds, many were quick to notice bore the initials LSD), an "audio visual multi media group" combining lighting technology and experimental music. The LSD, which continued into the 1990s, established itself at various West Coast venues, including the San Francisco Museum of Modern Art and the Fillmore Auditorium (which, with its "omnipresent pot smoke" noted by songwriter Carole King, became known for its psychedelic posters), and appeared with, among others, Big Brother and the Holding Company and the Grateful Dead.

=== Vocal experimentation ===
After leaving We Five, Beverly Bivens sang for a while with the LSD, her work including vocal experimentation paralleling Yoko Ono's. A photograph taken backstage in 1968 at the LSD's own theater in San Francisco (which ran for about 18 months from January 1968) shows Bivens and Marshall with Ham, Granelli, saxophonist Noel Jewkes (born June 18, 1940) and Ham's assistant Robert (Bob) Fine. One observer wrote at the time that:

Using rear projection to flood a wide screen with essentially liquid images, and large speakers to project highly amplified jazz-electronic improvisations, the LSD. is an intensely dedicated, highly gifted group of light artists and musicians who carry abstract light-sound art to perhaps its ultimate in purity and concentration.

Less prosaically, Jewkes recalled the LSD as "far out ... It was a mind opening experience. We were on the cutting edge, you might say, back then".

In July 1970 Raiders of the Purple Sage, a band that included Jerry Garcia of the Grateful Dead, performed at the Matrix in San Francisco. A surviving tape reveals that they invited on stage to sing with them a lady introduced as “Bev”, who is assumed to have been Beverly Bivens.

== Family and later activities ==
=== 1970s–1980s ===
During the 1970s, Bivens appears to have done some session recording, as well as making occasional appearances on television and recording radio jingles. Until Bivens and Marshall divorced in 1978, the couple raised two children in Berkeley, California: the saxophonist Joshi Marshall, who was born in Berkeley in 1971, and a daughter, Zoe Terry Marguerite. In the 1990s Marshall played with the Marshall Arts Trio of which his father Fred Marshall (1938–2001) was also a member. In 1995 he joined Mingus Amungus, a band that drew its inspiration from the composer and bassist Charlie Mingus, and has latterly developed his own Joshi Marshall Project.

In 2014 Joshi, who has a son, Elijah Cole, with wife Leah, recalled an unorthodox childhood which was dominated by his parents' passion for music: "Everything was about music and art. It was like, you sleep here and you sleep there, and you have to be part of our trip ... But I wouldn't trade it for anything, there was so much love". An earlier publicity biography of Joshi stated that, while still at Berkeley High School in the latter half of the 1980s, he would "play in and host sessions with his mother ... and many notable jazz musicians which included saxophonist Pharoah Sanders and pianist Benny Green."

Bivens' career after leaving We Five is not well documented and, until Jerry Burgan published a memoir of the early folk-rock scene in 2014, sketchy information was derived mainly from recollections posted on the internet. Various rumours that she had died persisted for many years. These seem to have been fuelled in part by confusion with Nansi Nevins of the band Sweetwater, who was critically injured in a motor accident in 1969.

=== 1990s and early 21st century ===
Jerry Burgan reported that, when he spoke to Bivens in 1999, she was not singing professionally. After Fred Marshall died in Oakland in 2001, an obituary published in his home state of Arkansas referred to Bivens' still living in Berkeley and to his having had another partner of long standing. However, it appears that, when Marshall fell ill, Bivens stepped in to care for him. In the mid 1990s Bivens was said by Burgan to be doing up an old house. This was subsequently sold and, when Burgan saw her in 2013, she was living in "a warehouse district" between Berkeley and Richmond.

=== Re-emergence (2009) and Jerry Burgan memoir (2014) ===
Joshi Marshall recorded "special thanks" to his mother in connection with his album In the Light, released in May 2009. The sleeve notes for Big Beat's retrospective CD of We Five's recordings, released in 2009, contained several reminiscences by Bivens and, on September 24 of that year, she sang "High Flying Bird" at the opening of an exhibition, mounted by the Performing Arts Library & Museum in San Francisco, of the rock scene in the Bay area in the mid-1960s to early 1970s. Asked by an ABC reporter if the latter appearance marked a resumption of her singing career, she remarked teasingly "God, I hope so. That would be awesome".

A memoir by Burgan, touching on Bivens' years in the Ridgerunners/We Five, her impact on the early folk-rock scene and subsequent 40-year seclusion, was published in April 2014 by Rowman & Littlefield. It is clear from this that Bivens has remained very circumspect about her life since We Five, and apart from her appearance in 2009, has resisted attempts to encourage her to sing again. Even when she and Burgan visited Bob Jones during his final illness in 2013, she was unwilling to sing "High Flying Bird", which the men strummed on their guitars, an omission for which, according to Burgan, she expressed regret during the return journey. The three were, however, photographed together. Burgan died in March 2021, and Pete Fullerton in September 2021, leaving Bivens as the sole surviving member of the original We Five.

== Discography: We Five (with Beverly Bivens) ==
=== Albums ===
The tracks shown in italics were solo (S) or largely solo performances by Beverly Bivens. However, her voice dominated virtually all recordings by We Five and some others (SF) contained marked solo flourishes.

- You Were on My Mind (1965) A&M LP-111/SP-4111

1. "Love Me Not Tomorrow (S)" 2. "Somewhere Beyond the Sea" 3. "My Favorite Things" 4. "If I Were Alone" 5. "Tonight" 6. "Cast Your Fate to the Wind" (SF) 7. "You Were on My Mind 8. "Can't Help Falling in Love" 9. "Small World" 10. "I Got Plenty O' Nuttin'" 11. "Softly As I Leave You" (SF) 12. "I Can Never Go Home Again" (SF)

- Make Someone Happy (1967) A&M LP-138/SP-4138

1. "Let's Get Together" 2. "High Flying Bird (S)" 3. "Make Someone Happy" 4. "Five Will Get You Ten" 5. "Somewhere" 6. "What Do I Do Now" 7. "The First Time" 8. "Our Day Will Come" 9. "Poet" 10. "What's Goin' On" 11. "Inch Worm" 12. "You Let a Love Burn Out"

- A compact disc, combining these albums, was released by PolyGram (DPSM 5172) in 1996.
- A compilation of 22 tracks by We Five, including two from 1969 by the post-Bivens incarnation of the band and takes of Coca-Cola advertisements recorded in 1965, was released by Big Beat (CDWIKD 286) in 2009 as There Stands the Door: The Best of We Five.

=== Other ===
- Several of the tracks on We Five's two albums were released as 45 inch singles or EPs. Special issues appeared in some countries, including Spain (for example, the 1966 EP Estabas en Mi Recuerdo [You Were on My Mind], distributed by Hispavox HDA 377-02). Brazil, Japan and the Netherlands. In Taiwan, You Were on My Mind was released on red vinyl.
- The title track of You Were on My Mind was included on the first disc ("Seismic Rumbles") of a 4-CD boxed set Love Is the Song We Sing: San Francisco Nuggets 1965–1970 (Rhino Records, 2007).
- An extract from Bivens' live performance of "High Flying Bird" in San Francisco in 2009 has been posted on YouTube
