= Ewel Cornett =

American theater producer, director, actor, and composer

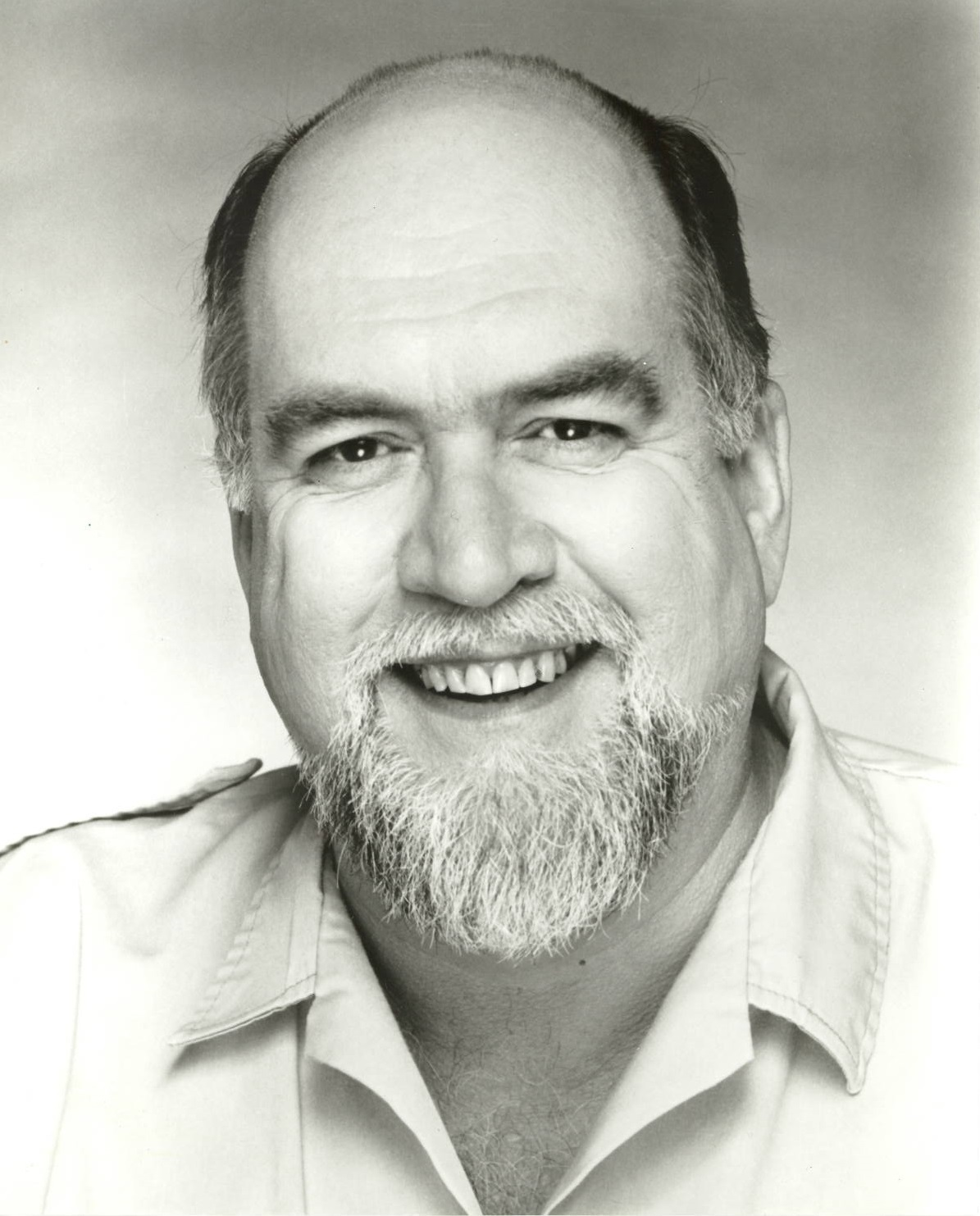
Ewel Cornett c. 1990

Ewel Cornett (1937–2002) was an American theater producer, director, actor, and composer. He is best known as the co-founder of Actors Theatre of Louisville and as a composer for various musical theater productions including Hatfields & McCoys, about the famous feud.

== Early life ==
Ewel Butler Cornett Jr. was born on January 10, 1937, in Louisville, Kentucky, the second son of Ewel Butler Cornett and Nettie Lyle Crawford.

As a young man, he sang in the choir at Crescent Hill Baptist Church, performed in summer amphitheater productions in Kentucky, including Paul Green's The Stephen Foster Story in Bardstown and Wilderness Road in Berea. He graduated from Atherton High School in 1954. He attended the University of Illinois Urbana-Champaign, first as an art major, and then as a voice performance major. A member of the university's music honors fraternity, he performed the lead role of Tarquinius in Benjamin Britten's opera, The Rape of Lucretia, as well as the lead roles in Carousel and Othello. He graduated with a Bachelor of Music degree in 1959 and moved to New York City to work as an actor.

== Acting career ==
Cornett performed on Broadway and on tour until the mid-1960s. He played the part of Sir Lionel in the second national tour of the Broadway musical Camelot in 1963–1964, where he also understudied the part of Lancelot. He played Prince DeLong in The Unsinkable Molly Brown, Al in The Most Happy Fella with Dorothy Collins, Debeque in South Pacific with Betsy Palmer, and Monsieur Bougne in Irma La Douce with Genevieve.

Off-Broadway, he played Windy/Prime Minister in Meet Peter Grant with David Hartmann; he played Wilder and served as the musical director of A Trip to Chinatown with Marvin Hamlisch. In regional theatre, he performed at Actors Theatre of Louisville (Ephraim in Desire Under the Elms and El Gallo in The Fantasticks) and Pittsburgh Playhouse (Mr. Peachum in Threepenny Opera and Captain Jim in Little Mary Sunshine). He quickly grew disillusioned with the treatment endured by actors in New York, and began early plans to return to Louisville to create his own theatre.

Cornett had a limited career as a lyric baritone, performing for the New England Opera Theatre under Boris Goldovsky, and for the Illinois Opera Theatre (Rigoletto, La bohème, Don Giovanni, Don Pasquale). He performed Stravinsky's Oedipus Rex with Leonard Bernstein for Omnibus television. He performed in Menotti’s The Labyrinth and Bach's St. Matthew Passion for NBC-TV Opera. For the Kentucky Opera, he directed Rigoletto, Cosi Fan Tutte, Madama Butterfly, Hansel & Gretel, Cavalleria rusticana, Tosca, Suor Angelica, West Side Story, The Most Happy Fella, Take Me Along, They Knew What They Wanted, Ah Wilderness!, Othello, Verdi's Macbeth, and La bohème.

In stock theatre, he served as actor, director, and/or producer for the Papermill Playhouse (New Jersey), Mineola Playhouse (Long Island), Meadowbrook Dinner Theatre, Pocono Playhouse, Kenebunkport, Orgunquit Playhouse, Skowhegan, and the Stephen Foster Drama Association.

His television directing credits include Chekhov's The Boor and the Christmas special A Village Christmas, both for CBS affiliates in Louisville, Kentucky.

== Theater production ==
In 1964, Cornett founded Actors, Inc., a regional theater in Louisville that would later merge with another to become Actors Theatre of Louisville.

Cornett was a disenchanted actor looking for new avenues to explore in expressing his artistic desires: "My life as an actor was an unhappy one. I was disgruntled with the way things were happening [in the business]." Cornett quickly abandoned New York City and arrived in Louisville with plans for hurriedly establishing a repertory theater.

In the first season of Actors, Inc., Cornett's productions of The Glass Menagerie, John Brown's Body, and Rashomon were considered critical successes. Other early productions included The Lady's Not for Burning, Desire Under the Elms, The Visit, The American Dream, The Zoo Story, Amphitryon (Plautus), Arms and the Man, The Caretaker, The Marriage Proposal, and The Boor. When Cornett's theater, Actors, Inc., merged with Richard Block's Theatre of Louisville to form Actors Theatre of Louisville in 1965, Cornett served as co-producer and co-director with Block. Unhappy with the partnership, Cornett issued an ultimatum to the board of directors of Actors Theatre of Louisville. The board narrowly voted to retain Block and accept Cornett's resignation.

Understandably, Cornett was devastated by the board's decision. Unfortunately for Cornett, his stubborn pride and impulsive decision led to his greatest blunder. […] Cornett left Louisville for West Virginia, where he enjoyed a self-described successful career. Nevertheless, he considered his brief tenure at Actors Theatre a learning experience, and he admitted that he wished he could have altered his actions.

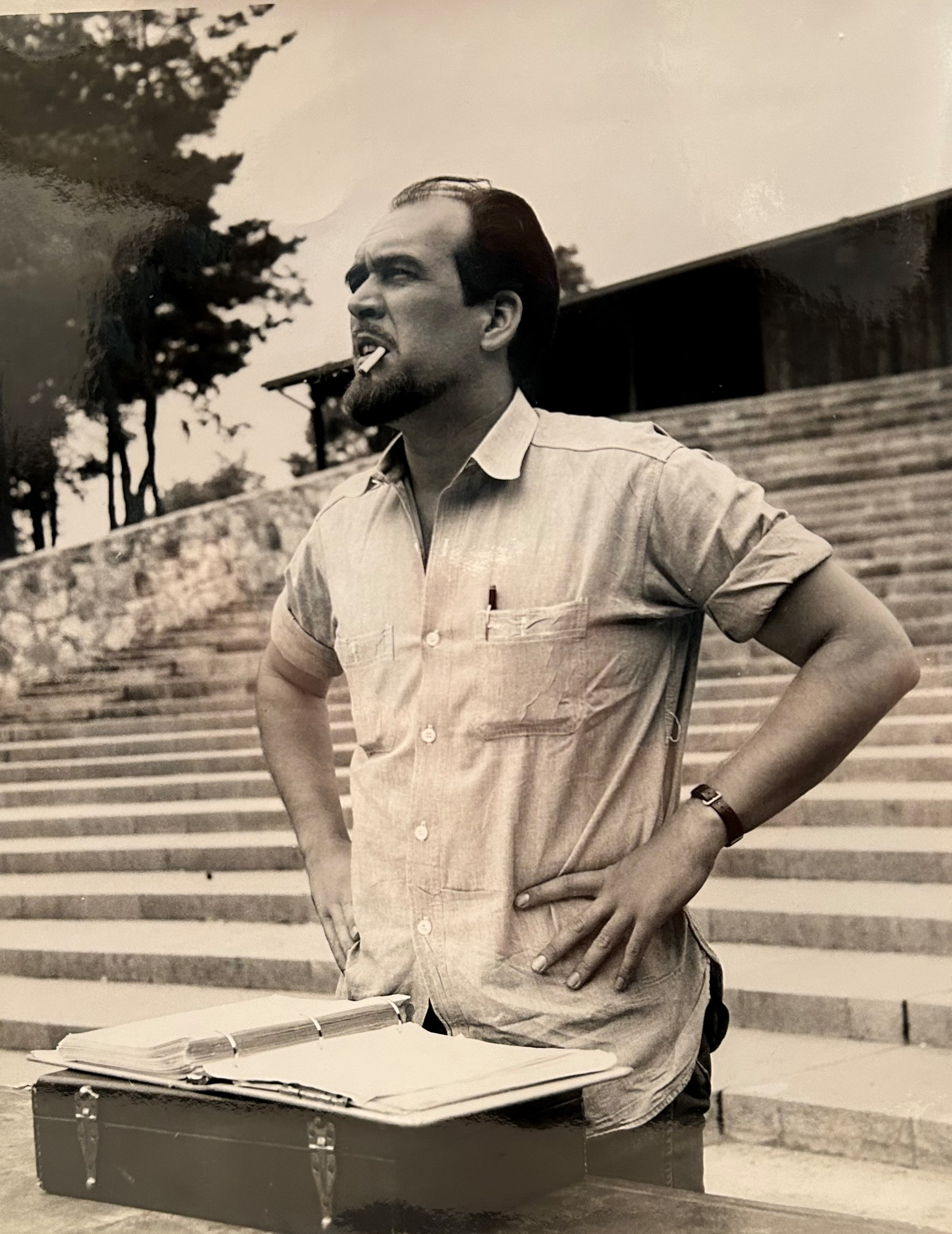
Ewel Cornett directing a play for Theatre West Virginia in 1970 at Cliffside Amphitheater in Grandview, New River Gorge National Park.

Cornett served as the producer and director of Theatre West Virginia from 1968 to 1980. He first produced the outdoor drama Honey in the Rock, which is performed annually at the Cliffside Amphitheatre at Grandview Park. He composed the music for the play Hatfields and McCoys (1970), written by Billy Edd Wheeler, for Theatre West Virginia. The show premiered on June 20, 1970, at the amphitheater at Grandview State Park in Beckley, West Virginia to positive reviews, and with ancestors of both families in the audience.

He produced and directed other performances during his seven seasons at Theatre West Virginia, including Angel Street; The Comedy of Shakespeare; The Apple Tree; I’m Herbert; She Stoops to Conquer; Romeo and Juliet; You’re a Good Man, Charlie Brown; The Fantasticks; Arms and the Man; The Boor; A Marriage Proposal; The Importance of Being Ernest; Sleuth; The Typists; The Tiger; Macbeth; Alias Mark Twain; Same Time, Next Year; The Last Meeting of the Knights of the White Magnolia; and scenes from The Taming of the Shrew; Kiss Me, Kate; and West Side Story. He also produced the world premiere of Mossie and the Strippers (1979) by Billy Edd Wheeler.

For the Children's Theatre of Theatre West Virginia, he produced and directed Androcles and the Lion, Dionysus & Company, The Emperor's New Clothes, The Firebird, Alice Underground, Circus, and The First Men in the Moon.

Cornett produced and directed the first two seasons of Young Abe Lincoln, an outdoor musical drama written by Billy Edd Wheeler, as well as Paul Green’s outdoor drama, Trumpet in the Land. He served as Executive Director of the West Virginia Italian Heritage Festival in Clarkburg, West Virginia in 1982.

== Music composition ==
Ewel Cornett composed 13 works for musical theater, including Honey in the Rock (1967) with Kermit Hunter, Hatfields and McCoys (1970) with Billy Edd Wheeler, Bar’bry & Willie (1977) with Billy Edd Wheeler, Dionysus & Company (1974) with John Benjamin and John O’Creagh, The Glass Christmas Tree (1983) with Billy Edd Wheeler, Cinderella (1985) adapted from the Brothers Grimm by Moses Goldberg, What a Way to Go (1994) with Billy Edd Wheeler and Dennis Burnside. He collaborated with author Moses Goldberg for StageOne: The Louisville Children’s Theatre to produce Jack and the Beanstalk, Little Red Riding Hood and the Three Little Pigs, and Sleeping Beauty (Dornröschen).

His unpublished compositions include the tone poem Hatfields & McCoys, which was performed by the Wheeling Symphony Orchestra in 1970, the musical John Brown (1979) with Billy Edd Wheeler, the musical John Brown's Body (1964) after Stephen Vincent Benet, as well as folk songs, art songs, and classical pieces for solo piano.

== Personal life ==
Ewel Cornett was named after his father, Ewel Butler Cornett (1906–1984), who was named after the brother of the nurse-midwife ("Miss Butler") who delivered him at a home birth in Knott County, Kentucky. According to historians at the Hindman Settlement School, Miss Butler traveled thirteen miles through the mountains on horseback to attend to the birth of Ewel Sr.

Cornett was married and divorced three times, to Barbara Lockard Zimmerman (1934–2012) in the mid-1960s, Linda Booth Cornett (1944–2004) in the early 1970s, and Marcia Atkins Graves (1949–2022) in the early 1980s. He was in a long-term relationship with Louisville theater patron Marjorie Ann Richey Shallcross (1929–2023) until his death. He had one child, Vanessa Cornett.

His mystery novel Kudzu Covers Manhattan (2005) was co-authored with Billy Edd Wheeler and published a year after his death. He was a member of the Actors' Equity Association, American Federation of Television and Radio Artists, American Guild of Musical Artists, and the American Society of Composers, Authors, and Publishers (ASCAP).

Ewel Cornett died on June 8, 2002, at age 65 from complications related to renal cell carcinoma. A celebration of his life was held at Actors Theatre of Louisville.
