= Early Flight =

Compilation album by Jefferson Airplane
- Released: February 1974
- Recorded: December 1965, November 1966, February 1970
- Studios: at RCA Victor's Music Center of the World (Hollywood); Pacific High (San Francisco); Wally Heider (San Francisco)
- Genre: Rock
- Length: 32:21
- Label: Grunt/RCA
- Producers: Rick Jarrard, Matthew Katz, Thomas Oliver

Jefferson Airplane chronology
Thirty Seconds Over Winterland (1973)	Early Flight (1974)	Flight Log (1977)

Professional ratings
Review scores
Source	Rating
AllMusic	3.5/5 stars
Christgau's Record Guide	B
The Encyclopedia of Popular Music	3/5 stars
Debaser	4/5 stars

Early Flight is a 1974 compilation album by the American psychedelic rock band Jefferson Airplane, released by the band's own Grunt Records, and distributed by RCA Records. It features previously unreleased material from 1965, 1966, and 1970 as well as both sides of a non-album 1970 single.

The first three tracks come from the recording sessions for Jefferson Airplane Takes Off which took place in December 1965 at RCA Victor's Music Center of the World recording studio in Hollywood. These tracks feature vocals by Signe Toly Anderson and Skip Spence on drums. "High Flying Bird", a folk standard by Billy Ed Wheeler, was a key number in the band's early live setlists and a version with Grace Slick on vocals can be seen in the film Monterey Pop. "Runnin' 'Round This World" had been previously released as a B-side on the "It's No Secret" single and appeared on the earliest pressings of Jefferson Airplane Takes Off before RCA deleted it, objecting to its use of the word "trips."

The closing two tracks on side one and the first track from side two come from the recording sessions for Surrealistic Pillow, which took place from October to November 1966 at RCA Victor's Music Center of the World. All three songs were played live around the time of the album's recording as heard on the archival release We Have Ignition, with "Go To Her" first attempted in the studio during sessions for the debut album; the earlier take with Signe on vocals would be included in the box set Jefferson Airplane Loves You. Former drummer Skip Spence penned "J.P.P. McStep B. Blues", which in 1969 would sometimes be played in a medley with "Wooden Ships." Tracks from the Takes Off and Surrealistic Pillow sessions appeared later as bonus tracks on the respective 2003 remasters.

"Up or Down", written by guitarist Jorma Kaukonen's brother Peter Kaukonen, comes from the early recording sessions for Bark, which took place in February 1970 at Pacific High and Wally Heider Studios before Marty Balin chose to leave the band. "Mexico" and "Have You Seen the Saucers?" had been previously released as a non-album single in 1970, but this was the first LP on which the two songs appeared. "Mexico" was author Grace Slick's rant against the anti-marijuana initiative Operation Intercept which caused it to be banned from radio in some states, while Kantner's "Have You Seen The Saucers" foreshadowed the sci-fi themes of his solo album Blows Against the Empire later that year. The latter song would also become a regular in Jefferson Starship's setlist during the mid-1970s, where bassist Pete Sears would usually take an extended solo.

== Track listing ==
Side one
No.	Title	Writer(s)	Length
1.	"High Flying Bird"	Billy Edd Wheeler	2:30
2.	"Runnin' Round This World" (from single B-side RCA #8679)	Marty Balin, Paul Kantner	2:21
3.	"It's Alright"	Kantner, Skip Spence	2:15
4.	"In the Morning"	Jorma Kaukonen	6:25
5.	"J.P.P. McStep B. Blues"	Spence	2:48

Side two
No.	Title	Writer(s)	Length
1.	"Go to Her"	Kantner, Irving Estes	3:58
2.	"Up or Down"	Peter Kaukonen	6:18
3.	"Mexico" (from single A-side RCA #0343)	Grace Slick	2:05
4.	"Have You Seen the Saucers?" (from single B-side RCA #0343)	Kantner	3:37

== Personnel ==
Jefferson Airplane

- Marty Balin – guitar, vocals
- Paul Kantner – rhythm guitar, vocals
- Jorma Kaukonen – lead guitar, vocals
- Jack Casady – bass
- Grace Slick – vocals on "J. P. P. McStep B. Blues", "Go to Her", "Mexico" and "Have You Seen the Saucers", piano on "Mexico" and "Have You Seen the Saucers"
- Spencer Dryden – drums on "In the Morning", "J. P. P. McStep B. Blues", "Go to Her", "Mexico" and "Have You Seen the Saucers"
- Signe Toly Anderson – vocals on "High Flying Bird", "Runnin' Round This World" and "It's Alright"
- Skip Spence – drums on "High Flying Bird", "Runnin' Round This World", "It's Alright" and "J. P. P. McStep B. Blues"
- Joey Covington – drums on "Up or Down", congas and bells on "Have You Seen the Saucers"

Additional Personnel

- Jerry Garcia – guitar on "In the Morning" and "J. P. P. McStep B. Blues"
- John Paul Hammond – harmonica on "In the Morning"

== Charts ==
Chart (1974)	Peak position
US Billboard 200	110

== Sources ==
- Tamarkin, Jeff (2005). Got a Revolution!: The Turbulent Flight of Jefferson Airplane. New York: Atria Books. ISBN 978-0-671-03404-7.

== Notes ==
- Early Flight (Vinyl gatefold). Jefferson Airplane. New York City: RCA. 1974. CYL1-0437.
