= S.T.R.A.H. =

Serbian and Yugoslav rock band

- Origin: Belgrade, Serbia
- Genres: Garage rock; death rock
- Years active: 1985-1991; 2016-present
- Labels: Produkcija Slovenija, Mascom
- Members: Željko Debeljević; Aleksandar Žikić; Aleksandar Timofejev; Miloš Marković
- Past members: Milutin Krstić; Saša Ristić; Nenad Ivković

S.T.R.A.H. (Serbian Cyrillic: С.Т.Р.А.Х.; trans. F.E.A.R.) is a Serbian and Yugoslav rock band formed in Belgrade in 1985.

In the several years after the formation the band performed rarely, but managed to gain cult status with its horror-influenced songs. They released one EP and disbanded at the beginning of Yugoslav Wars, while recording their debut album. In 2016 the band reunited, releasing their first full-length album in 2019.

== History ==
=== 1985–1991 ===
Inspired by American garage rock acts, Milutin Krstić (vocals), Željko Debeljević (guitar, vocals), Aleksandar Žikić (at the time a well-known music journalist, guitar), Saša Ristić (bass guitar) and Nenad Ivković (drums) formed the band S.T.R.A.H. The band chose their name after a fictional secret organization from the British comic The Steel Claw.

A year after the formation, Krstić left the band, so Debeljević took over lead vocals. The band performed rarely, but managed to gain cult status thanks to their own songs, as well as covers, one of the most successful being the song "Vođa" ("The Leader"), a cover of Crispian St. Peters' "The Pied Piper". In 1988, S.T.R.A.H. released their only release during the band's original run, the EP Mesec (The Moon), through Produkcija Slovenija record label. The EP, produced by Dušan Kojić "Koja" of Disciplina Kičme—who coined the explanation "Svako To Razume Ako Hoće" ("Everybody Can Understand It If He Wants To") for the acronym S.T.R.A.H.—featured four songs, "Mesec (Lunarni Mix)" ("The Moon ("Lunar Mix)"), "Mesec (Vampire State Dub Mix)", "Noćas" ("Tonight") and "Vudu lutka" ("Voodoo Doll"). The songs' lyrics were horror-influenced, and the album artwork featured horror images and the inscription Metus dominus unus est (Latin for "Fear Is the Only Master"). The back cover featured the logo and the address of the Count Dracula Fan Club from New York City.

After the release of the EP, Ivković was replaced by Aleksandar Timofejev. With the outbreak of Yugoslav Wars, the band disbanded while in the middle of recording their full-length début, Ristović and Debeljević emigrating to Canada.

=== Post breakup ===
Žikić continued his career as a journalist, writing for music magazines and working on television and radio. He wrote theatre plays Elvira je kul (Elvira Is Cool), Overdouz (transliteration for Overdose) and Ples aveti (The Dance of the Spectres). He wrote music books Fatalni ringišpil: Hronika beogradskog rokenrola 1959 - 1979 (Fatal Carousel: The Cronicle of Belgrade Rock 'n' Roll 1959, 1979, 1999), Mesto u mećavi: Priča o Milanu Mladenoviću (A Spot in the Blizzard: The Story of Milan Mladenović, 1999), and a book about whiskey entitled Vatra iz vode (Fire from Water, 2003). He also wrote a pull-out book Electrodeo: Almanah nove američke muzike (Electrodeo - The Almanac of New American Music), published by magazine NON.

Timofejev was a journalist on RTV Studio B, later moving to Radio B92 and eventually becoming program editor on RTV Studio B. For a time he hosted his own talk show, Timofejev.

Nenad Ivković died in a car accident on 2 July 2008.

=== 2016–present ===
In 2016, after a 25 years-long hiatus, three members of the last incarnation of S.T.R.A.H., Debeljević, Žikić and Timofejev, reunited, with new bass player, Miloš Marković "Felix" (of the band Optimal Problem). In June 2016, they played in Belgrade for the first time since 1991, at the closing of the Dok’n'Ritam musical documentary film festival. In September 2017 they had their first full concert since the reuinon, alongside fellow 1980s Belgrade garage rock band Petar Pan, in club Elektropionir in Belgrade.

In May 2019 the band released their first full-length release, the album Kvog! through Mascom record label. The album was, as the band's 1988 EP, produced by Dušan Kojić "Koja". Alongside new songs, the album featured their old previously unrecorded songs. The song "Kameleon" ("Chameleon") featured guest appearance by actress Lola Orlović on vocals.

== Legacy ==
Serbian rock band Eva Braun released a cover of the song "Noćas", recorded on their 2001 concert in Belgrade, on the 2008 compilation album Off the Record (1997–2006). The song "Mesec" was covered in 2021 by Serbian musician Miloš Ratker and released as a single.

== Discography ==
=== Studio albums ===
- Kvog! (2019)

=== EPs ===
- Mesec (1988)
