= Make Someone Happy =

Make Someone Happy may refer to:

- Make Someone Happy (Sophie Milman album), 2007
- Make Someone Happy (Lonnie Liston Smith album), 1986
- Make Someone Happy (We Five album), 1967
- "Make Someone Happy" (song), a song from the musical Do Re Mi
- "Make Someone Happy", an episode from season 5 of Thomas & Friends
