= Crispian St. Peters =

Musical artist (1939-2010)

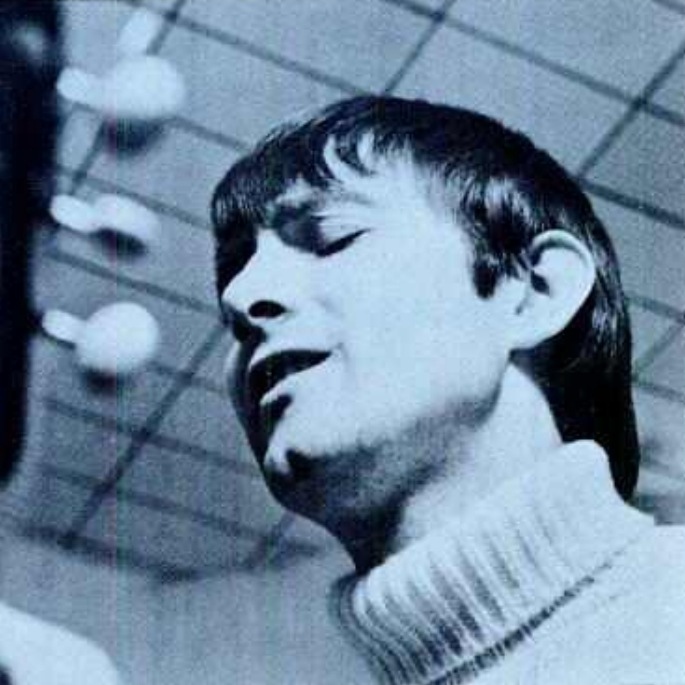

Background information
- Born: Robin Peter Smith; 5 April 1939; Swanley, Kent, England
- Died: 8 June 2010 (aged 71) Kent, England
- Genre: Pop
- Occupation: singer-songwriter
- Years active: 1956–2001
- Labels: Decca (UK), Square (UK), Jamie (US), London (Canada)
- Website: Official website

Crispian St. Peters (born Robin Peter Smith; 5 April 1939 – 8 June 2010) was an English pop singer-songwriter, best known for his work in the 1960s, particularly hit songs written by the duo The Changin' Times (comprising Steve Duboff and Artie Kornfeld), including "The Pied Piper", and Ian & Sylvia's "You Were on My Mind".

His popularity waned after he claimed he was a better performer than other well known singers and declared that he was a better songwriter than the Beatles.

== Biography ==
=== Early career ===
Robin Peter Smith was born in Swanley, Kent, and attended Swanley Secondary Modern School. He learned the guitar and left school in 1954 to become an assistant cinema projectionist. As a young man, he performed in several relatively unknown bands in England. In 1956, he gave his first live performance, as a member of The Hard Travellers. Through the late 1950s and early 1960s, as well as undertaking National Service, he was a member of The Country Gentlemen, Beat Formula Three, and Peter & The Wolves.

=== Decca label ===
While a member of Beat Formula Three in 1963, he was heard by David Nicholson, an publicist for EMI, who became his manager. Nicholson suggested he use a stage name, initially "Crispin Blacke" and subsequently Crispian St. Peters, then promoted his client as being nineteen years of age, shaving off five years from his actual age of 24. In 1964, as a member of Peter & The Wolves, St. Peters made his first commercial recording. He was persuaded to turn solo by Nicholson and was signed to Decca Records in 1965. His first two singles on this record label, "No No No" and "At This Moment", proved unsuccessful on the charts. He made two television UK appearances in February of that year, featuring in the shows Scene at 6.30 and Ready Steady Go!

In 1966, St. Peters' career finally yielded a Top 10 hit in the UK Singles Chart, with "You Were on My Mind", a song written and first recorded in 1964 by the Canadian folk duo, Ian & Sylvia, and a hit in the United States for We Five in 1965. St. Peters' single eventually hit No. 2 in the UK and was then released in the US on the Philadelphia-based Jamie Records label. It did not chart in the US until a year after his fourth release, "The Pied Piper", became known as his signature song and a Top 10 hit in the United States and the UK. Although his next single, a version of Phil Ochs' song "Changes", also reached the charts in both the UK and US, it was much less successful. In 1967, St. Peters released his first LP, Follow Me..., which included several of his own songs, as well as the single "Free Spirit". One of them, "I'll Give You Love", was recorded by Marty Kristian in a version produced by St. Peters, and became a big hit in Australia. St. Peters' album was followed by his first EP, Almost Persuaded, yet by 1970, he was dropped by Decca. "You Were on My Mind" was featured in the 1996 German film Jenseits Der Stille (Beyond Silence).

==== Claims about his talent ====
After the success of "You Were on my Mind", St Peters gave an interview to the New Musical Express claiming that he was a better song-writer than the Beatles and that his performance on stage made Elvis Presley look like the Statue of Liberty. After just one hit single, he claimed he was going to be “bigger than Presley, was more talented than Sammy Davis Jr.”, “sexier than Dave Berry” and “more exciting than Tom Jones”. These comments did not go down well in the pop music press, who began to treat him as a conceited outcast. After his fourth single flopped, work and money dried up, and he became depressed. In 1970, he was dropped by Decca and admitted to hospital suffering from a nervous breakdown.

=== Square label ===
Later in 1970, he was signed to Square Records. Under this new record deal, St. Peters released a second LP, Simply, that year, predominantly of country and western songs. Later still they released his first cassette, The Gospel Tape, in 1986, and a second cassette, New Tracks on Old Lines in 1990. His third cassette, Night Sessions, Vol. 1 was released in 1993.

Several CDs also came from this record deal, including Follow Me in 1991, The Anthology in 1996, Night Sessions, Vol. 1 in 1998, The Gospel Tape in 1999, and, finally, Songs From The Attic in 2000. He also performed on various Sixties nostalgia tours, and continued to write and arrange for others until his later ill health.

== Personal life ==
From 1969 to 1974, St. Peters was married to Collette. They had a son and a daughter.

On 1 January 1995, at the age of 55, he suffered a stroke which, along with emphysema, severely limited his music career. He announced his retirement in 2001. After 2003, he was hospitalised several times with pneumonia.

St. Peters died on 8 June 2010, after a long illness, at the age of 71.

== Discography ==
=== Albums ===
Year	Album	Record Label
1966	The Pied Piper	Jamie Records
1966	Follow Me...	Decca Records
1970	Simply	Square Records

=== Singles ===
Year	Title	Peak chart positions				Record Label	B-side	Album
Year	Title	US	UK	AUS	CAN	Record Label	B-side	Album
1965	"At This Moment"	–	–	–	–	Decca Records	"You'll Forget Me, Goodbye"	
1965	"No, No, No"	–	–	44	–	Decca Records	"Three Goodbyes"	
1966	"You Were on My Mind"	36	2	45	29	Decca Records	"What I'm Gonna Be"	Follow Me...
1966	"The Pied Piper"	4	5	5	1	Decca Records	"Sweet Dawn My True Love"	Follow Me...
1966	"Changes"	57	47	62	35	Decca Records	"My Little Brown Eyes"	
1966	"But She's Untrue"	–	–	33	–	Decca Records	"Your Ever Changin' Mind" (US No. 106)	Follow Me...
1967	"Almost Persuaded"	–	52	94	–	Decca Records	"You Have Gone"	
1967	"Free Spirit"	–	–	90	–	Decca Records	"I'm Always Crying"	
1968	"That's the Time"	–	–	–	–	Decca Records	"The Silent Times"	
1968	"Low Bad Hurting" as Country Smith	–	–	–	–	Decca Records	"No Longer Mine"	
1968	"Look into My Teardrops" (US release only)	133	–	–	–	Jamie Records	"Please Take Me Back"	Simply
1968	"Carolina"	–	–	–	–	Decca Records	"That's Why We Are Through"	
1970	"So Long"	–	–	–	–	Decca Records	"My Little Brown Eyes"	Follow Me...
1970	"Wandering Hobo"	–	–	–	–	Square Records	"Love, Love, Love"	Simply
1974	"Do Daddy Do"	–	–	–	–	Santa Ponsa Records	"Every Time You Sinned"	
1975	"Carolina"; Re-release	–	–	–	–	Route Records	"Samantha"	

== See also ==
- List of performers on Top of the Pops
- RPM number-one hits of 1966
- List of artists under the Decca Records label
