= You Were on My Mind (album) =

Studio album by We Five
- Released: 1965
- Genre: Folk
- Length: 29:36
- Label: A&M
- Producer: Frank Werber

We Five chronology
| You Were on My Mind (1965) | Make Someone Happy (1967) |

Singles from You Were on My Mind
- 1. "You Were on My Mind" Released: June 1965

You Were on My Mind is the first studio album by the folk band We Five which was released in 1965.

The title track hit #1 on the adult contemporary chart and #3 on The Billboard Hot 100. The album landed on the Billboard 200, reaching #32. The single also marked a musical transition because the single was one of the first to feature drums and the electric guitar on a folk composition.

== Reception ==
Professional ratings
Review scores
| Source | Rating |
|---|---|
| Allmusic | 3/5 stars |

Writing for Allmusic, music critic Richie Unterberger wrote of the album "The harmonies are nice, and an overlooked influence upon the early San Francisco rock scene. But the album as a whole is pretty lightweight, with nothing else in the same league as "You Were on My Mind."

== Track listing ==
1. "Love Me Not Tomorrow" (John Stewart)
2. "Somewhere Beyond the Sea" (Charles Trenet, Jack Lawrence)
3. "My Favorite Things" (Richard Rodgers, Oscar Hammerstein II)
4. "If I Were Alone" (Mike Stewart, John Stewart)
5. "Tonight" (Stephen Sondheim, Leonard Bernstein)
6. "Cast Your Fate to the Wind" (Vince Guaraldi, Carel Werber)
7. "You Were on My Mind" (Sylvia Fricker)
8. "Can't Help Falling in Love" (George David Weiss, Hugo Peretti, Luigi Creatore)
9. "Small World" (Jule Styne, Stephen Sondheim)
10. "I Got Plenty o' Nuttin'" (Dorothy Heyward, Ira Gershwin, George Gershwin)
11. "Softly, as I Leave You" (Antonio De Vita, Hal Shaper)
12. "I Can Never Go Home Again" (John Stewart)

== Charts ==
Album

| Year | Chart | Peak position |
|---|---|---|
| 1965 | Billboard Top LPs | 32 |

Singles

| Year | Single | Chart | Peak position |
|---|---|---|---|
| 1965 | "You Were on My Mind" | Billboard Hot 100 | 3 |
| 1965 | "You Were on My Mind" | Easy Listening | 1 |
