= Actors Theatre of Louisville =

Theater in downtown Louisville, Kentucky

- Formation: 1964
- Type: Regional theater
- Website: www.actorstheatre.org

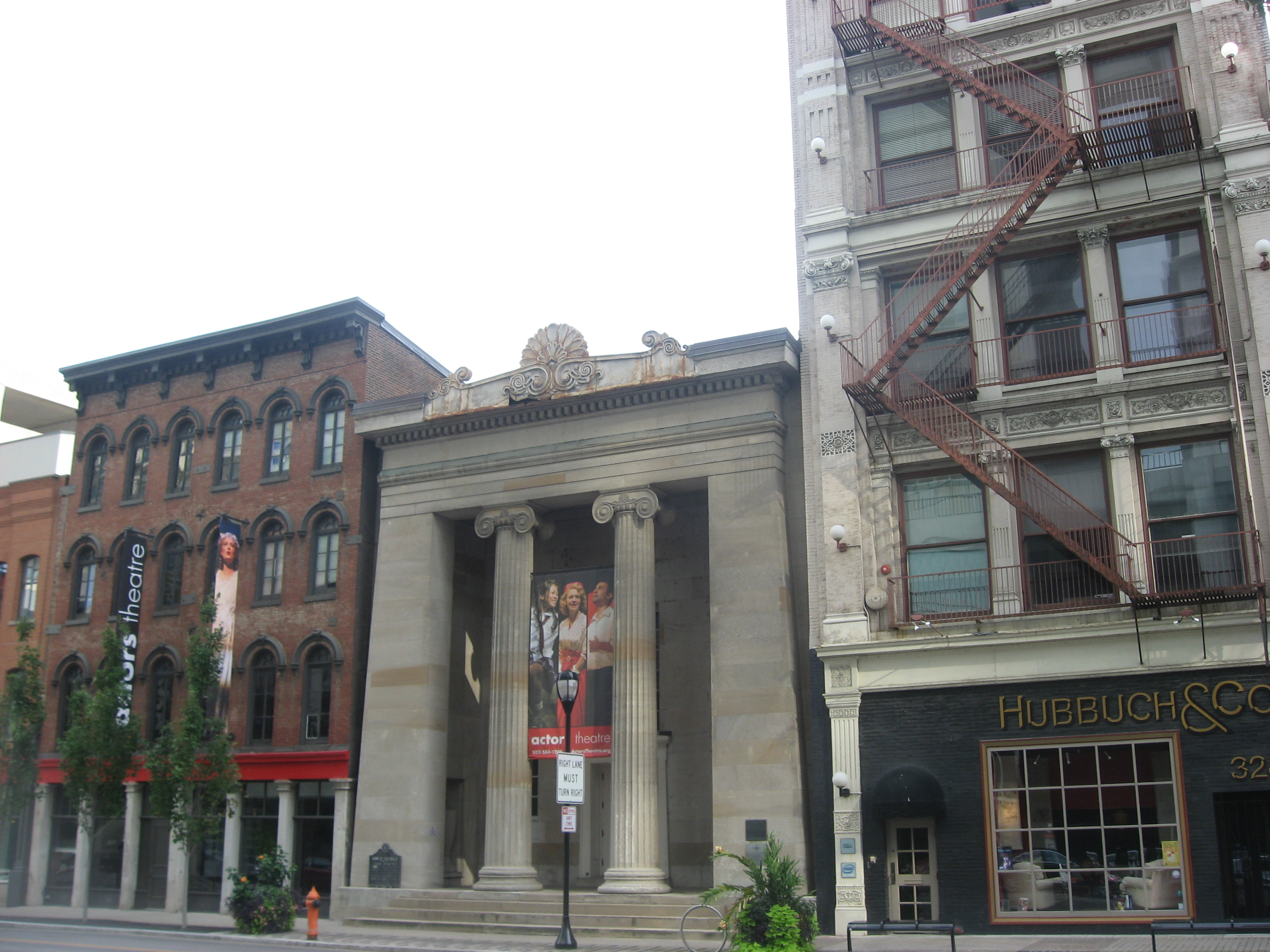
- Interactive map of Actors Theatre of Louisville
- Address: 316 West Main St. Louisville, Kentucky; United States
- Coordinates: 38°15′23.01″N 85°45′19.86″W
- Capacity: 633 (Pamela Brown Auditorium); 300 (Bingham Theatre); 124 (Victor Jory Theatre)

Actors Theatre of Louisville is a non-profit performing arts theater located in downtown Louisville, Kentucky. Actors Theatre was founded in 1964 following the merging of two local companies, Actors, Inc. and Theatre Louisville, operated by Louisville natives Ewel Cornett and Richard Block. Designated as the "State Theater of Kentucky" in 1974, in 2002 the theatre was described by the National Endowment for the Arts as "one of America's most consistently innovative professional theatre companies", with an annual attendance of 150,000.

The theatre presents almost 400 performances annually, including classics and contemporary work through the Brown-Forman Series, holiday plays, a series of free theatrical events produced by the Professional Training Company, and the Humana Festival of New American Plays. In addition, the theatre provides arts experiences to students across the region through its education department and supports a pre-professional resident training program, the Professional Training Company.

The theatre has been the recipient of a Tony Award for Distinguished Achievement, the James N. Vaughan Memorial Award for Exceptional Achievement and Contribution to the Development of Professional Theatre, and the Margo Jones Award for the Encouragement of New Plays. The theater has toured to 29 cities and 15 countries. Currently, there are more than 50 published books of plays and criticism from the theater in circulation—including anthologies of Humana Festival plays, volumes of ten-minute plays and monologues, and essays, scripts and lectures from the Brown-Forman Classics in Context Festival. Numerous plays first produced at the theatre have also been published as individual acting editions.

== Humana Festival of New American Plays ==
The Humana Festival has introduced nearly 450 plays into the American and international theatre's general repertoire, including three Pulitzer Prize winners—The Gin Game by D. L. Coburn, Crimes of the Heart by Beth Henley and Dinner with Friends by Donald Margulies—as well as Marsha Norman's Getting Out, John Pielmeier's Agnes of God, Charles Mee's Big Love, Naomi Iizuka's Polaroid Stories and At the Vanishing Point, Jane Martin's Anton in Show Business, Rinne Groff's The Ruby Sunrise, Theresa Rebeck's The Scene, Gina Gionfriddo's After Ashley and Becky Shaw, UNIVERSES' Ameriville, Rude Mechs' The Method Gun, Dan O'Brien's The Cherry Sisters Revisited, Jordan Harrison's Maple and Vine, Will Eno's Gnit, Branden Jacobs-Jenkins' Appropriate, and Lucas Hnath's Death Tax and The Christians. More than 380 Humana Festival plays have been published in anthologies and individual acting editions.

The Humana Festival draws visitors from around the world. About 36,000 patrons attend the five weeks of plays and associated events, which include a dedicated weekend for college students. Students from more than 40 colleges and universities attend. The Festival culminates in two Industry Weekends which bring together new plays, discussion panels, parties, and networking events.

== Leadership ==
In May 1969, Jon Jory, the son of stage and screen star Victor Jory was appointed the theater's new producing director. During this three decades in Louisville he produced more than 1,300 plays, increased Actors Theatre's budget from $244,000 to $8.3 million. His Louisville debut was in October 1969 with Dylan Thomas' Under Milk Wood. Former executive director, Alexander Speer, whose tenure of forty years began in 1965, became Jory's partner and led the theater's administration and operations until his retirement in the spring of 2006.

Marc Masterson was appointed the company's new artistic director in 2000. He had previously served as producing director of City Theatre in Pittsburgh. During his tenure at Actors Theatre, Masterson produced more than 200 plays and expanded and established an Education Department consisting of public outreach programs including classroom workshops, artists in the schools, increased weekday student matinées, backstage tours and professional development for teachers and community center leaders. Masterson left Actors Theatre in 2011 to become artistic director at South Coast Repertory in California.

Following a national search, Obie Award-winning director Les Waters was named artistic director on November 29, 2011, and assumed full-time duties at the theater in January 2012. A strong proponent of contemporary work and imaginative adaptations of classic materials, Waters is widely regarded as one of the most influential directors working in America today. In November 2017, Waters announced that the season would be his last. He left Louisville in summer 2018 to pursue his freelance directing career.

== Buildings ==
The original home of Actors Theatre was an open loft—the former Egyptian Tea Room—above the Taylor Trunk Company on Fourth Street in downtown Louisville. In 1965, the theater relocated to the former site of the Illinois Central Railway Station on Seventh Street and River Road. The space was transformed by Architect Jasper Ward into a 350-seat theatre. In the fall of 1969, the city announced that the train station was to be demolished to make way for a connector highway. In October 1972, the theater relocated to the newly renovated Old Bank of Louisville building on Main Street, where it remains to this day. The building that became Actors Theatre was a merging of two buildings: the 1837 James H. Dakin-designed Old Bank of Louisville (which is a National Historic Landmark) and the Myers-Thompson Display Building. In 2004 the theatre acquired a production studio at 9th and Magnolia Streets in the Old Louisville neighborhood.

== See also ==
- List of attractions and events in the Louisville metropolitan area
- Performing arts in Louisville, Kentucky
