= Butterfly haircut =

Hairstyle

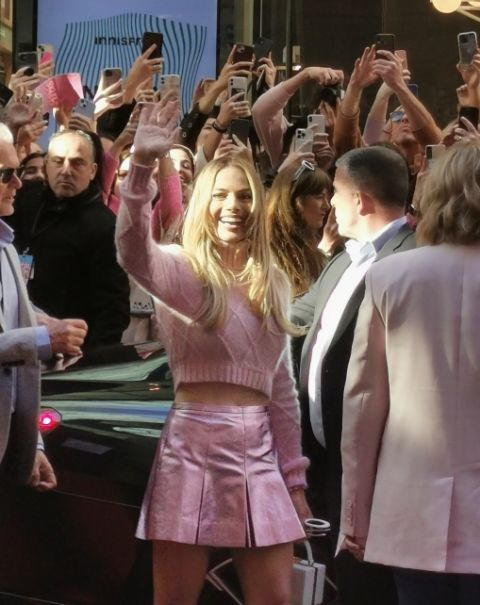
Margot Robbie wearing a butterfly cut

The butterfly haircut is a hairstyle featuring numerous layers to create volume throughout the hair. It blends shorter and longer layers throughout the hair, as well as face-framing layers. According to L'Oreal Paris, the butterfly haircut "is going to be a flattering style for most", though it works best for individuals whose hair is at least shoulder length.

The butterfly haircut was first introduced in 1950s, then arose to popularity in the 1990s and mid-2010s. It became highly popular in 2023 via TikTok and other social media platforms.

People who have worn a butterfly haircut include Shania Twain, Christie Brinkley, Matilda Djerf, and Hailee Steinfeld.

== See also ==
- List of hairstyles
