= The Changin' Times =

American songwriting and performing duo

The Changin' Times were an American songwriting and performing duo, consisting of Artie Kornfeld and Steve Duboff. Their most famous song was "The Pied Piper", which was released in 1965. They also wrote songs for other artists. "The Pied Piper" and other songs they recorded, like "Free Spirit", were covered by British singer Crispian St. Peters.

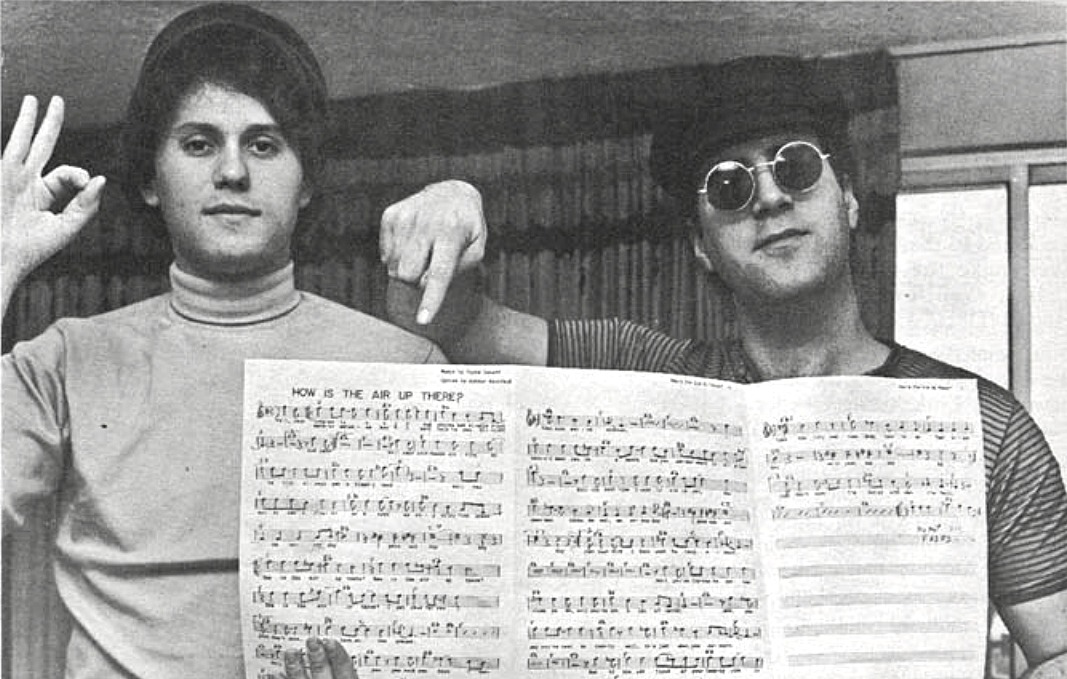
Artie Kornfeld (left) and Steve Duboff (right), circa 1965
