= Rasmus Djerf =

Swedish ice hockey player

- Born: August 5, 1993 (age 32) Valdemarsvik, Sweden
- Height: 5 ft 11 in (180 cm)
- Weight: 179 lb (81 kg; 12 st 11 lb)
- Position: Right wing
- Shoots: Left
- team Former teams: Free agent HV71
- NHL draft: Undrafted
- Playing career: 2011–present

Rasmus Djerf (born August 8, 1993) is a Swedish ice hockey player. He is currently a free agent having last played for Kalmar HC of the Hockeyettan.

He played two games in the Elitserien for HV71 during the 2012–13 Elitserien season.
