= You Were on My Mind =

"You Were On My Mind"

Single by We Five

from the album You Were on My Mind
- B-side: "Small World"
- Released: 1965
- Recorded: 1965
- Genre: Folk rock
- Length: 2:39
- Label: A&M
- Songwriter: Sylvia Fricker
- Producer: Frank Werber

We Five singles chronology
"You Were On My Mind" (1965)	"Let's Get Together" (1966)

"You Were on My Mind" is a popular song written by Sylvia Fricker in 1961. It was originally recorded by Ian & Sylvia, but better known versions were recorded by We Five and Crispian St. Peters.

== Background ==
The song was written in a bathtub in a suite at the Hotel Earle in Greenwich Village. Fricker wrote it—her first composition—in the bathroom because "it was the only place ... the cockroaches would not go".

It was originally performed by Fricker and her future husband Ian Tyson as the duo Ian & Sylvia, and they recorded it in 1963 for their 1964 album on the Vanguard label, Northern Journey. It reached No.33 on the Canadian CHUM Charts. Ian and Sylvia re-recorded the song in 1972 with their band Great Speckled Bird, reaching No. 4 on the Canadian easy listening chart.

The song was published in sheet form by M. Witmark & Sons of New York City in 1965.

== Charting cover versions ==
- In 1965, the song was covered in an up-tempo version, with slightly altered lyrics and melody, by the San Francisco folk-pop band We Five. Their recording reached No. 3 on the Billboard Hot 100 chart in September 1965 and topped the Billboard easy listening chart for five weeks. Billboard ranked the record as the No. 4 song of 1965. In Canada, this version reached No. 4. The performance by We Five is noteworthy for the gradual buildup in intensity, starting off somewhat flowing and gentle, increasing in intensity in the third stanza and remaining so through the fourth stanza. The fifth and final stanza starts off gently and concludes very intensely, ending with a series of guitar chords. The dominant voice was that of the band's lead singer Beverly Bivens.
- Barry McGuire recorded a version for his 1965 album Eve of Destruction as track no. 9.
- In the United Kingdom, Crispian St. Peters recorded the song in late 1965, and scored a No. 2 hit with it in 1966. His version was also released in the United States in 1967 and went to No. 36 on the Billboard Hot 100 and No. 29 in Canada. It was featured on his album, Follow Me...
- In Italy it was a best seller in 1966, with the title translated as Io ho in mente te (I have you on my mind), recorded by Paul Anka and, most of all, by the Equipe 84 band.
- Bobby Penn recorded a version for the 50 States Records label which was released in 1971. It made it to no. 51 on the Billboard Hot Country Singles chart.
- There was also a version by The Mike Curb Congregation in 1975.

== See also ==
- List of Billboard Easy Listening number ones of 1965
