= Make Someone Happy (We Five album) =

Studio album by We Five
- Released: 1967
- Genre: Folk
- Length: 26:32
- Label: A&M
- Producer: Frank Werber

We Five chronology
You Were on My Mind (1965)	Make Someone Happy (1967)	The Return of We Five (1969)

Make Someone Happy is the second studio album by the folk band We Five released in 1967.

The group had a top 40 hit with the Chet Powers song Let's Get Together, reaching #31 on The Billboard Hot 100. The album landed on the Billboard 200, reaching #172. The title track comes from the musical, Do Re Mi.

The group would disband after the album but would reform in 1969.

== Reception ==
Professional ratings
Review scores
Source	Rating
Allmusic	3/5 stars

Writing for Allmusic, music critic Richie Unterberger praised singer Beverly Biven's "best, gutsiest vocal" on "High Flying Bird" but wrote of the album "[We Five] try too hard to establish their versatility on this record, with fey renderings of standards like "Somewhere" and "Our Day Will Come" mixing uncomfortably with some fairly sturdy (if pop-oriented) folk-rock."

== Track listing ==
1. "Let's Get Together" (Chet Powers)
2. "High Flying Bird" (Billy Edd Wheeler)
3. "Make Someone Happy" (Jule Styne, Betty Comden, Adolph Green)
4. "Five Will Get You Ten" (Frank May)
5. "Somewhere" (Stephen Sondheim, Leonard Bernstein)
6. "What Do I Do Now?" (Bill Chadwick, Randy Sterling, Michael Stewart)
7. "The First Time" (Ewan MacColl)
8. "Our Day Will Come" (Bob Hilliard, Mort Garson)
9. "Poet" (John Stewart, Michael Stewart)
10. "What's Goin' On" (Michael Stewart)
11. "The Inch Worm" (Frank Loesser)
12. "You Let a Love Burn Out" (Randy Sterling)

== Charts ==
Album

Year	Chart	Peak Position
1967	Billboard 200	172

Singles

Year	Single	Chart	Peak Position
1967	"Let's Get Together"	Billboard Hot 100	31
