= Matilda Djerf =

Swedish influencer and entrepreneur (born 1997)

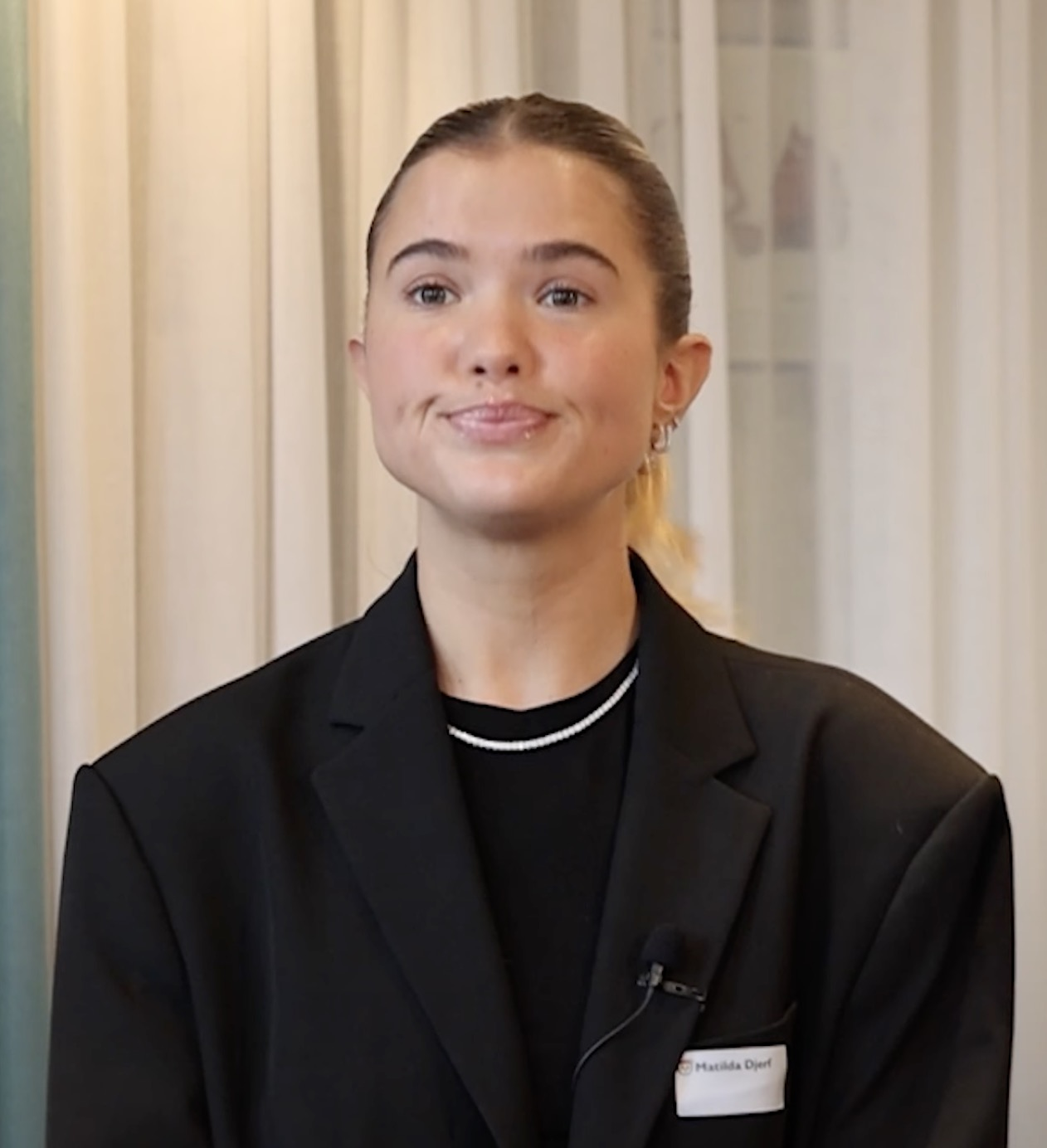
- Djerf in 2022
- Born: Matilda Saga Albertina Djerf; 8 April 1997 (age 29); Borås, Sweden
- Education: Sven Eriksonsgymnasiet
- Occupations: Influencer; fashion designer; entrepreneur
- Partner: Rasmus Johansson

Matilda Saga Albertina Djerf (born 8 April 1997) is a Swedish businesswoman and fashion designer. She is the co-founder of eponymous fashion and beauty brand Djerf Avenue.

== Early life ==
Djerf was born in 1997 in Borås in Västra Götaland County. She is the youngest among three siblings. She and her family lived in Monterey, California for two years, where she also attended school. Djerf stated that she experienced bullying while at school in California. The family returned to Sweden when Djerf was in her early teenage years.

While attending high school, Djerf gained a general interest in writing and photography, which later led to her creating a personal blog. Djerf was also the editor for her school's annual newspaper. She worked numerous jobs as a teenager, such as being employed as a salesperson at her uncle's fish store. Djerf has described in various interviews that she always disliked having a boss and working under others, and that she instead saw herself being more appropriately suited to leadership positions whereby she could enact changes and improvements in the workplace.

== Career ==
Djerf's career as a social media influencer began in 2016 during a trip to the Caribbean with her boyfriend, Rasmus Johansson. She began by sharing updates with family and friends through a blog, but her popularity grew when she started posting bikini looks on Instagram. Subsequent journeys to Bali and Australia further grew Djerf's following. Upon her return to Sweden, she decided to utilize her success on Instagram by making it her profession. Initially financing her travels through modeling assignments and brand collaborations, she gradually transitioned into a full-time influencer by 2018.

In 2019, Djerf co-founded Djerf Avenue with Johansson, who now serves as the company's CEO. The brand's debut collection, inspired by Djerf's personal style and wardrobe needs, sold out rapidly. Operating initially from her parents' apartment, the brand later expanded into office and warehouse space in Stockholm. Djerf Avenue garments are made in Italy, Portugal, and Sweden.

As of 2022, the brand is valued at $34.5 million.

In 2024, Djerf faced allegations of mistreatment of employees in Djerf Avenue. Eleven anonymous employees accused Djerf of bullying, favoritism, and body-shaming models. In addressing the controversy, Djerf issued an apology and blamed the issues on her lack of leadership skills.
