= Billy Edd Wheeler =

American singer-songwriter (1932–2024)

- Born: Billy Edward Wheeler; December 9, 1932; Boone County, West Virginia, U.S.
- Origin: Whitesville, West Virginia, U.S.
- Died: September 16, 2024 (aged 91) Swannanoa, North Carolina, U.S.
- Genres: Folk; country
- Occupations: Singer-songwriter; playwright
- Instrument: Guitar
- Years active: 1964–2012
- Labels: Kapp; United Artists; RCA; Radio Cinema; NSD

Billy Edd Wheeler (December 9, 1932 – September 16, 2024) was an American songwriter, performer, writer, and visual artist.

His songs include "Jackson" (Grammy award winner for Johnny Cash and June Carter) "The Reverend Mr. Black", "Desert Pete", "Ann", "High Flyin' Bird", "The Coming of the Roads", "It’s Midnight", "Ode to the Little Brown Shack Out Back", "Coal Tattoo", "Winter Sky", and "Coward of the County" (which inspired a 1981 television movie of the same name) and have been performed by over 160 artists including Judy Collins, Jefferson Airplane, Bobby Darin, Richie Havens, The Kingston Trio, Neil Young, Kenny Rogers, Hazel Dickens, Florence and the Machine, Kathy Mattea, Nancy Sinatra, and Elvis Presley. "Jackson" was also recorded by Joaquin Phoenix and Reese Witherspoon for the movie Walk the Line. His song "Sassafras" was covered in the folk rock era by Modern Folk Quartet and The West Coast Pop Art Experimental Band.

Wheeler was the author-composer of eight plays and musicals, a folk opera (Song of the Cumberland Gap), commissioned by the National Geographic Society, and three outdoor dramas: the long-running Hatfields & McCoys at Beckley, West Virginia, Young Abe Lincoln at Lincoln Amphitheatre, Lincoln City, Indiana, and Johnny Appleseed, at Mansfield, Ohio. He has authored six books of humor, four with Loyal Jones of Berea, Kentucky: Laughter in Appalachia, Hometown Humor USA, Curing the Cross-Eyed Mule, and More Laughter in Appalachia, and two as sole author: Outhouse Humor, and Real Country Humor / Jokes from Country Music Personalities. His first novel, Star of Appalachia, was published in January 2004, and his second, co-written with Ewel Cornett, Kudzu Covers Manhattan, in 2005. Song of a Woods Colt, a book of poetry, was published in 1969. Travis and Other Poems of the Swannanoa Valley (With Some Poems and Prayers by Dr. Henry W. Jensen) was published in 1977. He was the featured author in Appalachian Heritage magazine's 2008 winter issue, which included 16 of his original paintings. North Carolina’s Our State magazine featured him in its December 2007 issue. In 2018, Wheeler published a book of memoirs entitled Hotter Than A Pepper Sprout, a Hillybilly poet's journey from Appalachia to Yale to writing hits for Elvis, Johnny Cash & More.

== Biography ==
Wheeler was born on December 9, 1932, in Boone County, West Virginia. He graduated from Warren Wilson College in 1953, and Berea College in 1955. After serving as a student pilot in the Navy, he served as Alumni Director of Berea College. Wheeler recorded a couple of albums for Monitor Records, then from 1961 to 1962 he attended the Yale School of Drama, majoring in playwriting. With Ewel Cornett, he co-wrote the musical Hatfields and McCoys, which has been performed annually since 1970 by Theatre West Virginia in the Grandview Cliffside Amphitheatre (part of the New River Gorge National River area). He was married to the former Mary Mitchell Bannerman. They had two adult children, Lucy and Travis, and lived in Swannanoa, North Carolina.

In the 1968 book by Milt Okun Something to Sing About: the personal choices of America's folk singers, Wheeler's choice was "Turtle Dove" ("Fare Thee Well"). He died at his home in Swannanoa, North Carolina, on September 16, 2024, at the age of 91.

== Discography ==
=== Albums ===
Year	Album	Chart Positions		Label
Year	Album	US Country	US	Label
1961	Billy Edd: USA	—	—	Monitor
1962	Billy Edd and Bluegrass, Too	—	—	Monitor
1963	A New Bag of Songs	—	—	Kapp
1964	Memories of America	6	132	Kapp
1965	The Wheeler Man	—	—	Kapp
1966	Goin' Town and Country	—	—	Kapp
1967	Paper Birds	—	—	Kapp
1968	I Ain't the Worrying Kind	—	—	Kapp
1969	Nashville Zodiac	—	—	United Artists
1971	Love	—	—	RCA
1972	Some Mountain Tales About Jack	—	—	Spoken Arts
1979	Wild Mountain Flowers	—	—	Flying Fish
1995	Songs I wrote With Chet	—	—	Sagittarius
2001	Milestones (A Self Portrait)	—	—	Sagittarius
2006	New Wine From Old Vines	—	—	Sagittarius

=== Singles ===
Year	Single	Chart Positions			Album
Year	Single	US Country	US	CAN	Album
1964	"Ode to the Little Brown Shack Out Back"	3	50	3	Memories of America
1968	"I Ain't the Worryin' Kind"	63	—	—	I Ain't the Worryin' Kind
1969	"West Virginia Woman"	51	—	—	single only
1969	"Fried Chicken and a Country Tune"	62	—	—	Nashville Zodiac
1972	"200 Lbs. O' Slingin' Hound"	71	—	—	singles only
1979	"Duel Under the Snow"	94	—	—	singles only
1979	"Ring the Bells of Freedom"	—	—	—	singles only
1980	"Humperdink, the Coon-Hunting Monkey"	—	—	—	singles only
1981	"Daddy" (with Rashell Richmond)	55	—	—	singles only

== Awards ==
Wheeler was inducted into the Nashville Songwriters Hall of Fame in 2001, the West Virginia Music Hall of Fame in 2007, and the North Carolina Music Hall of Fame in 2011. He received an honorary Doctor of Humane Letters degree from his two alma maters: Berea College in 2004, and Warren Wilson College in 2011.

He has received 13 awards from ASCAP, the "Best Appalachian Poetry" from Morris Harvey College, and Billboard Magazine’s "Pacesetter Award for Music and Drama". In June 2005, Country Music Television voted "Jackson" one of the 100 Greatest Duet Songs of Country Music.

== Bibliography ==
- Song of a Woods Colt, Droke House (Anderson, SC) 1969
- Travis & Other Poems of the Swannanoa Valley, Wild Goose, Inc.
