= Honey in the Rock (play) =

Honey in the Rock is an outdoor musical-drama by American playwright Kermit Hunter and composer Jack Kilpatrick. It is the oldest American Civil War drama that continues to be performed. Honey in the Rock has been performed annually by Theatre West Virginia since 1961 at the Cliffside Amphitheatre in Grandview Park within the New River Gorge National River protected area near Beckley, West Virginia. The drama tells the story of the turbulent times during the Civil War that created the state of West Virginia.
