= Artie Kornfeld =

American singer

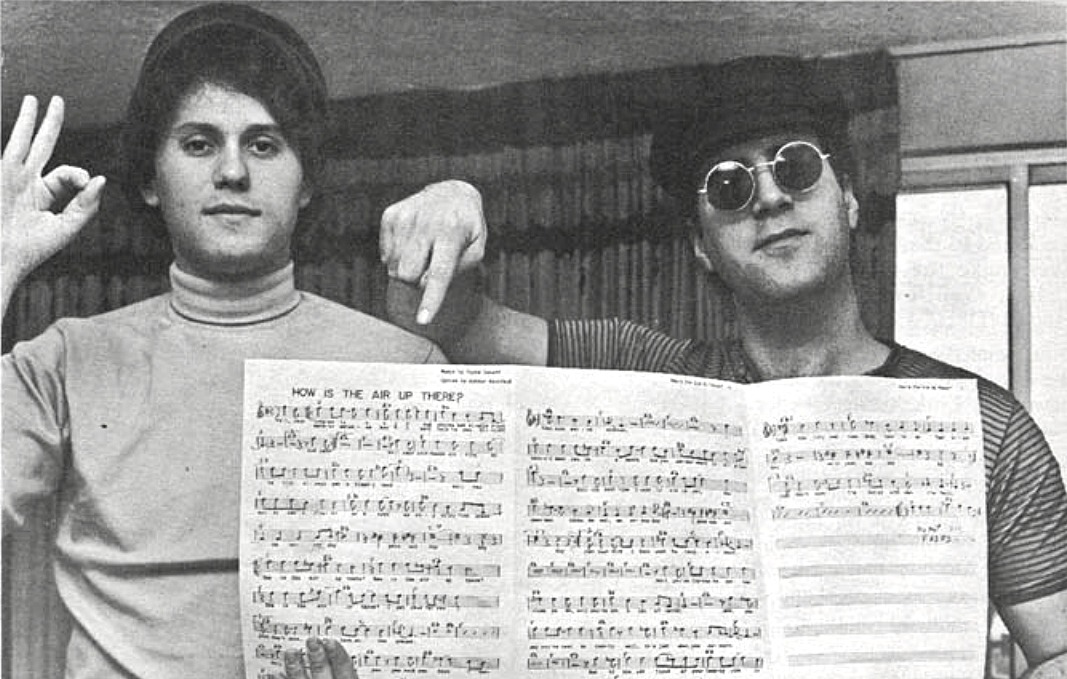
- Kornfeld (left) with songwriting and performing partner Steve Duboff
- Born: September 9, 1942 (age 84); Brooklyn, New York, U.S.
- Other name: Arthur Lawrence Kornfeld
- Occupations: Concert promoter; record producer; songwriter; musician

Arthur Lawrence Kornfeld (born September 9, 1942) is an American musician, record producer, and music executive. He is best known as the music producer promoter for the Woodstock Festival held in 1969. Kornfeld is also known for his collaborations with Artie Kaplan.

== Biography ==
Kornfeld was born on September 9, 1942 into a Jewish lower-middle-class family in Brooklyn, New York, United States.

In his early teens, when his family had moved to North Carolina, he got a job at the Charlotte Coliseum selling soda pop so he could catch acts such as Elvis Presley, Chuck Berry, and Fats Domino.

He later attended Adelphi College and American University where he would further his music career.

By 1966, Kornfeld had written over 75 Billboard charted songs and participated in over 150 albums. In 1969, Kornfeld left Capitol Records to co-create The Woodstock Music & Arts Festival, with Michael Lang .

He hosts a show, The Spirit Show with Artie Kornfeld on artistfirst.com

== Personal life ==
In 1999, Kornfeld moved to Broward County, Florida. In 2005, he moved to Delray Beach, Florida. He lives with Caroline Ornstein.

== Discography ==
=== Singles ===
- The Changin' Times – "Pied Piper" / "Thank You Babe" – Philips 40320 (1965)
- The Changin' Times – "How Is The Air Up There" – Philips 40341 (1965)
- The Changin' Times – "All In The Mind Of A Young Girl" / "Aladdin" – Philips 40401 (1966)
- The Changin' Times – "I Should Have Brought Her Home" / "Goin' Lovin' With You" – Philips 40368 (1966)
- The Changin' Times – "Free Spirit (She Comes On)" / "You Just Seem To Know" – Bell 675 (1967)
- The Artie Kornfeld Circus – "The Rain, The Park & Other Things" / "The Lonely Mermaid" – Bell 697 (1967)
- The Artie Kornfeld Tree – "Country Morning On 56th Street" / "Rock 'n Roll Babies" – Dunhill D-4259 (1970)
- Artie Kornfeld – "Island Song" / "Feel" – Neighborhood NRA-4206 (1972)

=== Albums ===
- The Artie Kornfeld Tree – A Time To Remember! – ABC/Dunhill Records – DS 50092 (1970)

== Publication ==
- The Pied Piper of Woodstock (Paperback), 196 pages; Publisher: Spirit of the Woodstock Nation, LLC (October 19, 2009); ISBN 978-0-615-32599-6
