= We Five =

American folk rock group

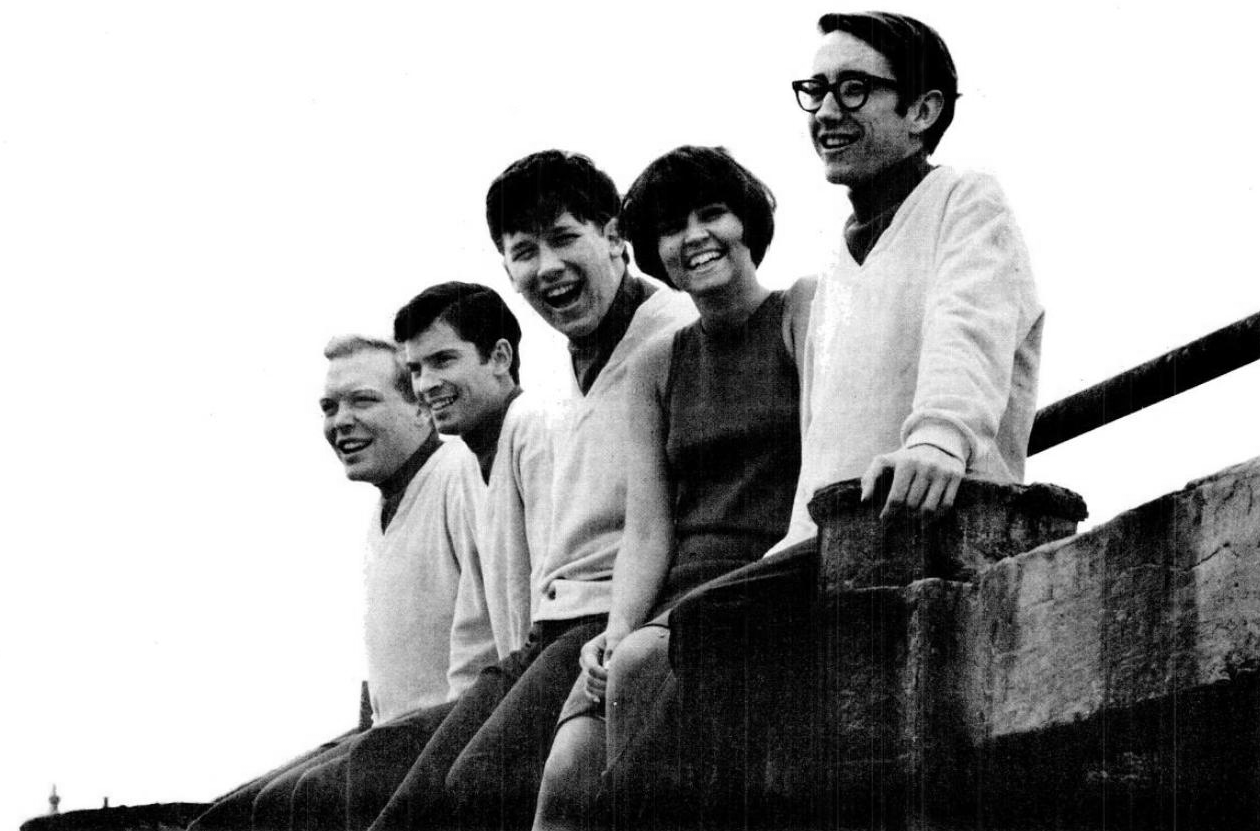
- We Five in 1966

Background information
- Origin: San Francisco, California, U.S.
- Genres: Folk rock
- Years active: 1964–1967; 1968–1970, several incarnations since then (see below)
- Labels: A&M Records, Vault
- Website: officialwefive.com

We Five was a 1960s folk rock musical group based in San Francisco, California. Their best-known hit was their 1965 remake of Ian & Sylvia's "You Were on My Mind", which reached No. 1 on the Cashbox chart, No. 3 on the Billboard Hot 100, and No. 1 on the Adult Contemporary chart. The original group split after recording their second album in 1967, but a re-formed band produced three more albums between 1968 and 1977.

== Biography ==
=== Formation and organization ===
We Five on the cover of their first album

Michael Stewart was the brother of John Stewart of The Kingston Trio and came from Claremont, California. When Michael was a student at the University of San Francisco in 1964, he formed We Five as a quartet, although it soon added another member. The group played adult rock 'n roll, pop jazz, Broadway show tunes, and Disney tunes. Stewart did all the arrangements, which ranged from "My Favorite Things", in a style which reflected Bach, to "Very Merry Un-birthday". He put in several additional hours working on arrangements after the five band members worked together for five or six hours each day.

The ensemble played acoustic guitars, electric guitar, and bass guitar and sang multi-part harmonies. The original quintet line-up, which grew out of a band called the Ridgerunners, included:

- Michael Stewart (1945–2002) (voice, 5-string banjo, 6-string acoustic guitar, 9-string electric guitar)
- Beverly Bivens (born 1946) (voice, guitar)
- Jerry Burgan (1945–2021) (voice, guitar)
- Pete Fullerton (1946–2021) (voice, acoustic and electric bass guitar)
- Bob Jones (1947–2013) (voice, guitar)

=== 1965–1970 ===
Record label A&M Records, owned by Herb Alpert, responded to the new popularity of folk and rock music by adding new artists starting in 1965 to its existing line-up of middle-of-the road material turned out by Alpert's Tijuana Brass, the Baja Marimba Band, and Brasil '66. In addition to We Five, Alpert's label released albums by Boyce and Hart, the Garden Club, and The Merry-Go-Round.

We Five's first album produced a major hit with the title tune, Stewart's re-arrangement of the Ian & Sylvia song "You Were on My Mind". Stewart made several changes to the original Sylvia Tyson composition, and the song went directly to the Billboard Top Five in 1965. It sold over one million copies, and was awarded a gold record. The group's second single was an arrangement of the popular song "Let's Get Together," written by Chester Powers, who performed under the name Dino Valenti. It reached No. 31 on the Billboard Hot 100 (and was later a Top Five hit and a million-seller for The Youngbloods as "Get Together").

In February 1966, We Five was nominated for a Grammy for Best Performance By A Vocal Group (for "You Were on My Mind"), against the Beatles among others, but they lost the award to the Anita Kerr Quartet. They were also the first commercial folk-rock artists to record music for Coca-Cola. The group added John Chambers as a touring drummer, so that it could tour behind its hit.

After completing their second album, Make Someone Happy, later in 1966, lead singer Beverly Bivens decided to leave the group. To continue, We Five replaced Bivens with Debbie Graf Burgan (wife of guitarist Jerry Burgan) and added a full-time drummer in Mick Gillespie for live performances. That same year, the band turned down an opportunity to record John Stewart's song "Daydream Believer", which went on to be an international hit for The Monkees.

We Five was among the artists included in a preliminary injunction issued by the Los Angeles Superior Court in April 1968. The edict prohibited bootlegging of A&M artists, including the Tijuana Brass and The Sandpipers. The action was directed against Superba Tapes, Inc., of Lancaster, California. The company had copied tapes of the recordings and sold them to the public without paying royalties to the artists.

The group would record two albums with Debbie Burgan singing lead, Return of the We Five (1969) for A&M and Catch the Wind (1970) for Vault. Neither album came close to the success of the earlier Bivens material. In 1970, Stewart, Jones and Fullerton all quit We Five, breaking up the original band.

=== Subsequent events ===
After We Five split up, Debbie Graf and Jerry Burgan kept a version of the group going through 1977. This group recorded another album in 1977, Take Each Day as It Comes for AVI Records before also disbanding. From 1977 through 1981, Jerry and Debbie performed as "The Burgans", supported by bassist Paul Foti.

Various versions of the band featuring the Burgans remained together for the next 30 years. The Burgans in March 2009 contributed an original song, "For Old Times," to an online-novel-with-music-tracks entitled "Alt. Country," scheduled to appear on the website of author Alan Rifkin.

Bob Jones was also a member of the current version of the band, which is now officially known as "We Five Folk Rock Revival." He died from pancreatic cancer on July 24, 2013. Later editions of the band also included Frank Denson, who went on to write music for television shows, including Magnum, P.I., Tales of the Gold Monkey, and Blossom; plus between 1968 and 1970 the drummer Mick Gillespie.

Pete Fullerton left the music business in 1970 to minister to the homeless and needy: he is the founder of the California-based organization "Truck of Love".

Michael Stewart appeared in occasional reunions with We Five from 1978 to 1989. He became a record producer (most notably for Billy Joel) and a pioneering developer of MIDI music software. He died on November 13, 2002, at age 57 as a result of "a long illness." Stewart's son, musician Jamie Stewart, has alleged several times that his father in fact died by suicide, though this has been unconfirmed.

In 2009, after many years of seclusion, Beverly Bivens sang at the opening of an exhibition, mounted by the Performing Arts Library & Museum in San Francisco, of the rock scene in the Bay area in the mid-sixties to early seventies.

There Stands the Door - The Best of We Five was released by Big Beat Records (CDWIKD 286) in 2009. The compilation included selections from both albums plus several unreleased recordings by the original group. This collection takes its name from the We Five single which Jerry Burgan observes just missed the raga rock trend.

Wounds to Bind: A Memoir of the Folk-Rock Revolution, a reminiscence by Jerry Burgan incorporating the birth of folk rock and the original band's subsequent collapse, with co-author Alan Rifkin and a foreword by Sylvia Tyson, was published in April 2014 by Rowman & Littlefield.

Jerry Burgan (born William Jerome Burgan on February 3, 1945) died on March 29, 2021, at age 76.

Pete Fullerton (born Clive Avon Fullerton on February 6, 1946, in Pomona, California) died on September 28, 2021, at age 75.

Beverly Bivens is the sole surviving member of the original group.

== Discography ==
=== Albums ===
Year	Album	Billboard 200	Record Label
1965	You Were on My Mind	32	A&M Records
1967	Make Someone Happy	172	A&M Records
1969	The Return of the We Five	—	A&M Records
1970	Catch the Wind	—	Vault Records
1977	Take Each Day as It Comes	—	Avi Records
2009	There Stands the Door: The Best of the We Five	—	Big Beat Records
"—" denotes releases that did not chart.

=== Singles ===
Year	Title	Peak chart positions				Record Label	B-side	Album
Year	Title	US Hot 100	US AC	CAN	AUS	Record Label	B-side	Album
1965	"You Were on My Mind"	3	1	4	16	A&M Records	"Small World"	You Were on My Mind
1965	"Let's Get Together"	31	—	5	—	A&M Records	"Cast Your Fate to the Wind"	Make Someone Happy
1966	"You Let a Love Burn Out"	—	—	—	—	A&M Records	"Somewhere Beyond the Sea"	Make Someone Happy
1966	"There Stands the Door"	116	—	—	—	A&M Records	"Somewhere"	Make Someone Happy
1966	"The First Time"	—	—	—	—	A&M Records	"What's Goin' On"	Make Someone Happy
1967	"High Flying Bird"	—	—	—	—	A&M Records	"What Do I Do Now?"	Make Someone Happy
1969	"Walk on By"	—	—	—	—	A&M Records	"It Really Doesn't Matter"	The Return of the We Five
1970	"Never Going Back"	—	—	—	—	Vault Records	"Here Comes the Sun"	Catch the Wind
1971	"Catch the Wind"	—	—	—	—	Vault Records	"Oh Lonesome Me"	Catch the Wind
1973	"Natural Way"	—	—	—	—	MGM Records	"Seven Day Change"	
1973	"Rejoice"	—	—	—	—	Verve Records	"Bandstand Dancer"	
"—" denotes releases that did not chart or were not released in that territory.

== See also ==
- List of bands from the San Francisco Bay Area
