= Taking Woodstock: A True Story of a Riot, a Concert and a Life =

Memoir (2007) film (2009)

- Author: Elliot Tiber, Tom Monte
- Publisher: Square One Publishers, Inc.
- Publication date: 2007

Taking Woodstock: A True Story of a Riot, a Concert and a Life is a memoir describing the origins of the 1969 Woodstock Festival by Elliot Tiber with Tom Monte. It was published in 2007 by Square One Publishers, Inc., and was adapted into a film of the same name by James Schamus, Ang Lee's long time writing/producing partner. It was released in August 2009. Tiber is portrayed in the film by Demetri Martin.

The book describes Tiber's involvement, as a young gay man, with the riots at the Stonewall Inn in New York City, and his key role in bringing the Woodstock festival to Bethel, New York.

== Before Woodstock ==
Tiber begins by describing his early years, and his awakening sexuality and alienation from his parents. He was born Eliyahu Teichberg to Jewish immigrant parents in Bensonhurst, Brooklyn. His father was born in Austria, and his mother was from Russia. His father was a roofer. Tiber attended a Brooklyn yeshiva. He graduated from Hunter College with a Bachelor of Fine Arts.

In 1955, while Tiber was attending college, his parents bought a dilapidated boarding house in White Lake, which is located at the intersection of Route 55 and 17B, a major intersection in White Lake, which is in the town of Bethel, New York. The area, part of the Borscht Belt, was in decline in the 1960s, and his parents struggled to meet their mortgage payments. The property was soon expanded into a motel. Tiber chose to live in New York City and spend his weekends with his parents in Bethel.

After graduating from college, Tiber got an apartment in Greenwich Village and became a display designer and decorator at the W. & J. Sloane department store on New York's Fifth Avenue. He also painted murals at upscale New York apartment buildings.

Tiber is gay, and he lived what he describes as a double life, pretending to be straight during his weekends helping his parents in Bethel, while living an openly gay life in New York City. The book describes the difficulties and traumas experienced by gays in the 1950s and 1960s. He describes being beaten up and robbed by youths who targeted him because of his homosexuality. He also describes encounters with celebrities, including Marlon Brando, Wally Cox, Rock Hudson, Truman Capote and Tennessee Williams. Hudson is described as lying nude and comatose at an upscale party, where he was subjected to sexual acts by guests.

Gays tended to quietly accept their fate at the time, Tiber says, but that all changed after the Stonewall riots, which occurred at a bar in Greenwich Village on June 28, 1969. Tiber describes being present at the Stonewall bar as the riots commenced, and he describes the experience as a liberating one that changed his life.

Tiber became president of the Bethel Chamber of Commerce, and he unsuccessfully sought a New York City clientele by inviting an acting troupe to the motel, and establishing an "underground cinema." He describes how he became friendly with Max Yasgur, who operated the largest farm in the area and had his own brand of dairy products.

== Woodstock ==
Every year, Tiber sponsored a rock festival at which six to ten local bands would perform. As head of the chamber of commerce, he had the authority to grant himself an official town permit allowing him to conduct the annual music and arts festival. When Tiber learned that the town of Walkill had decided not to allow the Woodstock festival to be held there, Tiber telephoned Woodstock organizer Michael Lang and told him that he had a valid permit to hold a rock festival, and fifteen acres to hold it in. Lang flew over immediately in a helicopter and met with him.

Lang was unimpressed with the motel property, so, according to Tiber's account, he told him about Yasgur's farm, which was located nearby, and drove with him to meet with Yasgur.

The book describes how the El Monaco became the headquarters for the Woodstock organizers, and how Tiber became the exclusive ticket agent for the festival and held a press conference at the motel. He describes in detail the strong opposition to the festival from local residents, some of whom created a human wall to try to stop young people from coming to the festival.

Tiber claims in the book that he was approached on several occasions by underworld characters, some of whom made threats, and that he and his parents had to physically fend them off, with the help of a transvestite named Velma. He also describes rowing out into the middle of White Lake, near the festival site, to pay off underworld characters.

Tiber was only able to come to the festival once, during which he had an LSD trip, and describes how the entire experience of Woodstock changed his life.

== Aftermath ==
Tiber left Bethel shortly after the festival and became a set designer for movie studios in California. His father died shortly afterwards and his mother died in 2006. The motel became an Italian restaurant and was later torn down.

== Factual accuracy ==
Lang has disputed Tiber's account of the initial meeting with Max Yasgur, and said that he was introduced to Yasgur by a real estate salesman Tiber referred him to. Lang says that the salesman drove Lang, without Tiber, to Yasgur's farm. Sam Yasgur, son of Max Yasgur, agrees with Lang's version, and says that his mother, who is still alive, says Max did not know Tiber. Artie Kornfeld, a Woodstock organizer, has said he found out about Yasgur’s farm from his own sources.

== Critical reaction ==
Publishers Weekly called the book an "occasionally improbable yet thoroughly entertaining tale."

== Film adaptation ==
Tiber met director Ang Lee at a San Francisco TV station, where Lee was promoting a film. The Los Angeles Times reported that "Tiber thrust his autobiography 'Taking Woodstock' into Lee's hands and pitched himself and his book as a kind of bookend to The Ice Storm, Lee's film about suburbanites wrestling with the hangover of the 1960s." Lee showed the book to Focus Features Chairman James Schamus, who has written most of his films. Lee said, "It seems like it's random occurrence, but that randomness happens all the time. I chose to do it and I connect with the material. I think that's fate." Schamus wrote the screenplay for the film adaptation of the book.
