= Yasgur =

Yasgur is a surname. Notable people with the surname include:

- Max Yasgur (1919–1973), American farmer
- Sam Yasgur (1942–2016), American lawyer
