= Taking Woodstock =

- Theatrical release poster
- Directed by: Ang Lee
- Screenplay by: James Schamus
- Based on: Taking Woodstock by Elliot Tiber; Tom Monte
- Produced by: James Schamus; Ang Lee; Celia Costas
- Starring: Demetri Martin; Paul Dano; Dan Fogler; Henry Goodman; Jonathan Groff; Emile Hirsch; Eugene Levy; Jeffrey Dean Morgan; Imelda Staunton; Liev Schreiber
- Cinematography: Eric Gautier
- Edited by: Tim Squyres
- Music by: Danny Elfman
- Distributed by: Focus Features
- Release date: August 28, 2009
- Running time: 120 minutes
- Country: United States
- Language: English
- Budget: $30 million
- Box office: $10 million

Taking Woodstock is a 2009 American historical musical comedy-drama film about the Woodstock Festival of 1969, directed by Ang Lee. The screenplay by James Schamus is based on the memoir Taking Woodstock: A True Story of a Riot, a Concert and a Life by Elliot Tiber and Tom Monte. The film premiered at the 2009 Cannes Film Festival, and opened in New York and Los Angeles on August 26, 2009, before its wide theatrical release two days later. It received mixed reviews and was a box office failure.

== Plot ==
Set in 1969, the film is based on the true story of Elliot Tiber, an aspiring Greenwich Village interior designer whose parents, Jake and Sonia, own the small dilapidated El Monaco Resort in White Lake, in the town of Bethel, New York. A hippie theater troupe, The Earthlight Players, rents the barn, but can barely pay any rent. Due to financial trouble, the motel may close. Elliot pleads with the local bank not to foreclose on the mortgage and Sonia delivers a tirade about her struggles as a Russian refugee. The family is given until the end of the summer to pay up.

Elliot plans to hold a small musical festival and has obtained a $1 permit from the town's chamber of commerce (of which he is also the president). Upon hearing the Woodstock Festival organizers face opposition against the originally planned location, he offers his permit and the motel accommodations to organizer Michael Lang. A neighbor, Max Yasgur, provides his nearby farmland; they agree on a $5,000 fee, but after realizing how many people will attend, Yasgur demands $75,000, which the organizers reluctantly accept. Elliot comes to agreement about the fee for the motel more smoothly. Initial objections by his mother quickly disappear when she sees the cash paid in advance.

Elliot and Yasgur encounter some expected opposition. The local diner refuses to continue serving Elliot, inspectors target the motel (and only his) for building code violations, and some local boys paint a swastika and hate words on the motel. However, resistance quickly dissolves in the tidal wave of peace and love (and commerce) brought to the area. The Tiber family works hard serving the massive influx of visitors and become wealthy in the process. A cross-dressing veteran, Vilma, is hired as a security guard. Elliot also struggles with hiding his homosexuality from his family, when he connects romantically with one of the event organizers staying at the motel.

On the concert's first day, Elliot, his father, and Vilma hear the music begin in the distance. Elliot's father, transformed and enlivened by all the new life in town, tells Elliot to go watch the concert. Elliot hitches a ride through the peaceful traffic jam on the back of a benevolent state trooper's motorcycle and arrives at the event. He meets a hippie couple, who invite him to join them on an LSD trip in their VW Bus a short distance from the crowd. Elliot initially has trouble relaxing but gradually melts into a psychedelic union with them. When they finally emerge after sundown, Elliot watches the vast crowd and brilliant lights of the distant concert ripple with harmonious hallucinatory visuals that swell into serene white light.

Elliot returns home from his liberating experience and has breakfast with his parents. He suggests to his mother that they now have enough money to replace him, but she cannot bear to release him. Elliot storms out, facetiously suggesting his mom eat the hash brownies Vilma has just offered. After another beautiful day at the festival, during which his Vietnam veteran friend, Billy, appears to overcome his post-traumatic stress disorder, Elliot returns home to find his parents laughing and cavorting hysterically, having eaten Vilma's hash brownies. The once-brittle family (particularly Sonia) is united in joy and delirious affection.

The next morning, however, Sonia inadvertently reveals that she has secretly saved $97,000 in cash in the closet's floorboards. Elliot is upset that his mother hid this while he used his own savings to help his parents.

After the final day of the concert, Elliot decides to move to California. He packs up his things and says farewell to his father, who encouraged him to strike out on his own. As Elliot pays one last visit to the concert and looks out over the muddy desolation of the Yasgur farm, Lang rides up on horseback and they marvel at how despite the obstacles, the event was a success. Lang mentions his next big project: staging a truly free concert in San Francisco with the Rolling Stones.

== Cast ==
- Demetri Martin as Elliot Teichberg/Tiber, who volunteered his family's motel to be the home base for Woodstock concert organizers which would take place on a nearby farm
- Imelda Staunton as Sonia Teichberg
- Henry Goodman as Jake Teichberg
- Liev Schreiber as Betty von Vilma, hired security.
- Jonathan Groff as Woodstock organizer Michael Lang
- Eugene Levy as Max Yasgur, who owns the nearby farm
- Emile Hirsch as Billy, a recently returned Vietnam vet
- Paul Dano and Kelli Garner as a hippie couple in a VW attending the concert
- Jeffrey Dean Morgan as Dan, Billy's brother and in opposition to the festival
- Adam Pally as festival co-organizer Artie Kornfeld
- Mamie Gummer as Tisha, Lang's assistant
- Dan Fogler as Devon, a local theater troupe head
- Skylar Astin as John P. Roberts, who bankrolled the Festival and co-organizer of Woodstock
- Adam LeFevre as Dave
- Richard Thomas as Reverend Don
- Kevin Chamberlin as Jackson Spiers
- Darren Pettie as Paul, the construction worker Elliot is attracted to
- Katherine Waterston as Penny
- Sondra James as Margaret
- Damian Kulash (uncredited) as a guitar-playing hippie
- Stefano Da Frè as Young Man #2

== Production ==
Principal photography took place from August to October 2008 in New Lebanon, New York and East Chatham, New York, located in Columbia County, New York.

== Factual accuracy ==
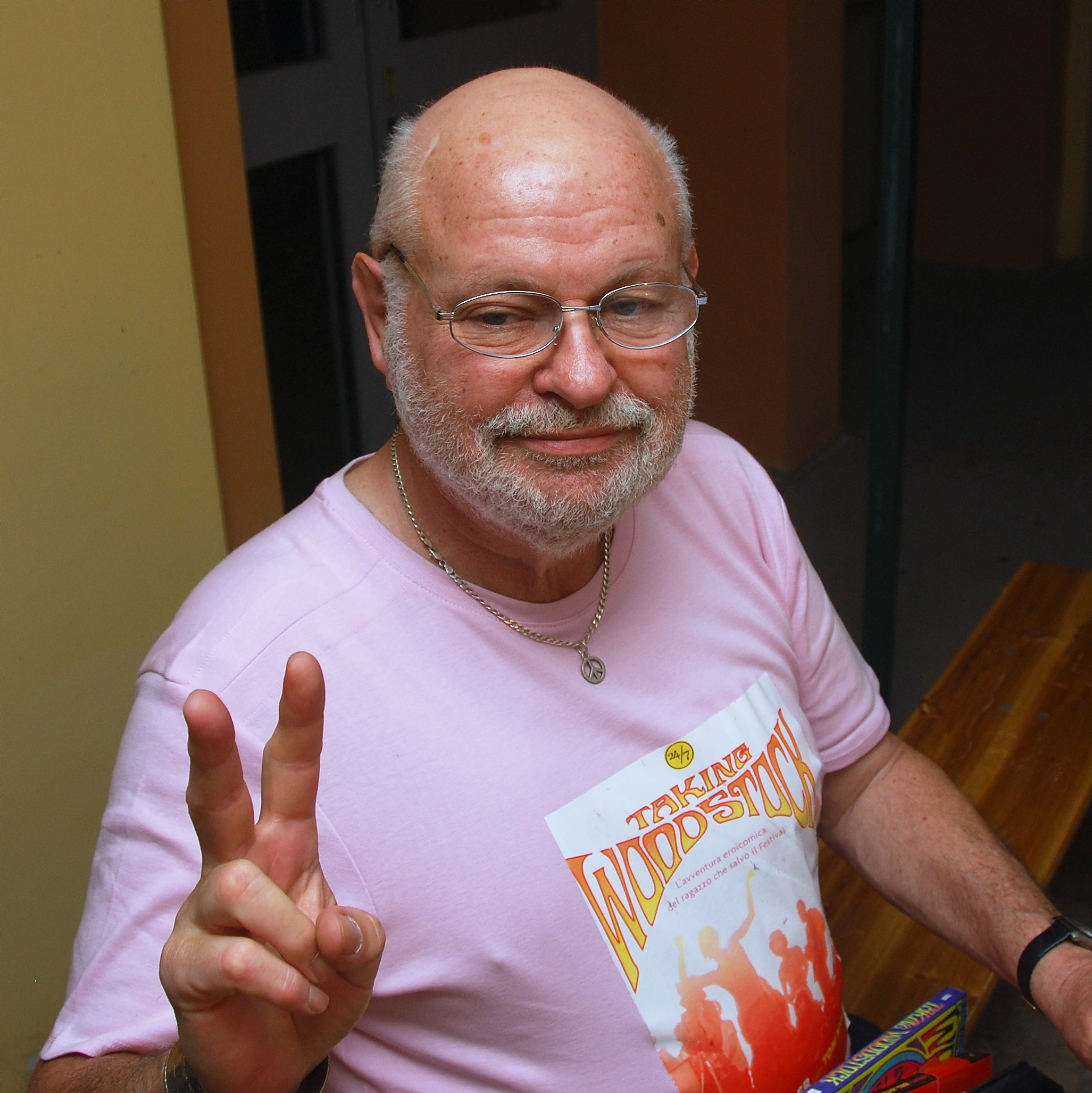
Elliot Tiber is the author of the memoir on which the movie is based (Bologna, June 2009).

Michael Lang has disputed Tiber's account of the initial meeting with Max Yasgur, and said that he was introduced to Yasgur by a real estate salesman. Lang says that the salesman drove him, without Tiber, to Yasgur's farm. Sam Yasgur, son of Max, agrees with Lang's version, and says that his mother, who is still alive, says Max did not know Tiber. Artie Kornfeld, a Woodstock organizer, has said he found out about Yasgur's farm from his own sources.

== Release ==
=== Box office ===
Taking Woodstock grossed $3,457,760 during its opening weekend, opening at #9. After five and a half weeks in theaters, on October 1, 2009, the film's total domestic box office gross was $7,460,204 with an overseas take of $2,515,533. The film grossed $9,975,737 worldwide, thus making the film, from an estimated $30 million budget, a box office bomb.

=== Critical reaction ===
The film maintains a 48% average on Rotten Tomatoes based on 179 reviews for an average rating of 5.4/10. The site's consensus states: "Featuring numerous 60s-era clichés, but little of the musical magic that highlighted the famous festival, Taking Woodstock is a breezy but underwhelming portrayal." It currently holds a score of 55% on Metacritic.

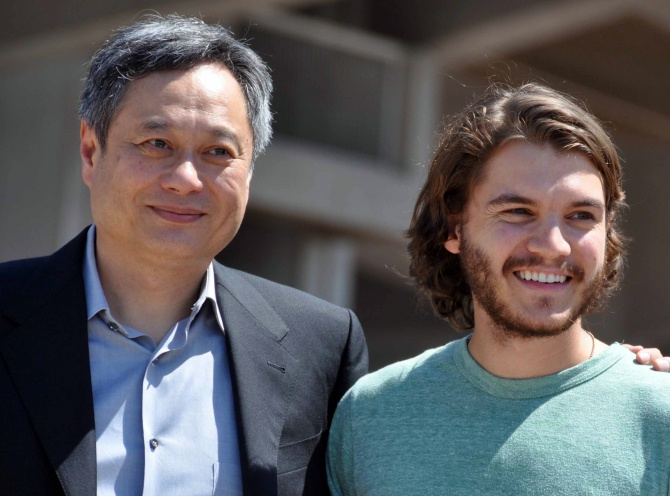
Director Ang Lee and actor Emile Hirsch promoting the film at the 2009 Cannes Film Festival.

Roger Ebert at the Chicago Sun-Times wrote: "... Lee and writer James Schamus aren't making a historical pastiche. This is a comedy with some sweet interludes and others that are cheerfully over the top, such as a nude theatrical troupe living in Elliot’s barn, and Vilma, his volunteer head of motel security, a transvestite ex-Marine played by Liev Schreiber. How does Schreiber, looking just as he usually does except for a blond wig and a dress, play a transvestite? Completely straight. It works."

Michael Phillips at the Chicago Tribune gave it 3 out 4 stars saying "Screenwriter James Schamus doesn’t do anything as stupid as shove Elliot back in the closet, but this is no Brokeback Catskills Mountain. It’s a mosaic – many characters, drifting in and out of focus – stitching the story of how the peace-and-music bash fell together as it bounced in the haphazard planning stages from its originally scheduled Wallkill, New York, location to a cow pasture in White Lake. (Eugene Levy, working hard to restrain his natural comic ebullience, plays the dairy farmer, Max Yasgur.)"

Stephen Holden at The New York Times liked the film, which he described as a "likable, humane movie" and "a small, intimate film into which is fitted a peripheral view of the landmark event". He pointed out that "Taking Woodstock pointedly shies away from spectacle, the better to focus on how the lives of individuals caught up by history are transformed ...the movie explicitly connects Woodstock to the gay-liberation movement and the Stonewall riots, which took place two months earlier that summer."

Melissa Anderson in The Village Voice wrote: "Ang Lee’s facile Taking Woodstock proves that the decade is still prone to the laziest, wide-eyed oversimplifications ... little music from the concert itself is heard. On display instead are inane, occasionally borderline offensive portrayals of Jews, performance artists, trannies, Vietnam vets, squares, and freaks."

Slate wrote: "After the long middle section building up to the actual Woodstock, the movie's treatment of the event is maddeningly indirect. No one's asking for a song-by-song re-enactment of the concert, but Lee's refusal to focus even for a moment on the musical aspect of the festival starts to feel almost perverse, as if he's deliberately frustrating the audience's desire."

=== Awards and nominations ===
Taking Woodstock lost when it was nominated for the GLAAD Media Award for "Outstanding Film – Wide Release" during the 21st GLAAD Media Awards to A Single Man.

== Home media ==
The DVD and Blu-ray were released on December 15, 2009. Special features include an audio commentary with director Ang Lee and writer/producer James Schamus, deleted scenes, and a featurette: Peace, Love, and Cinema. The Blu-ray features all the DVD features with additional deleted scenes, and another featurette: No Audience Required – The Earthlight Players.

== See also ==
- Woodstock, a 1970 concert film
- List of films featuring hallucinogens
