= COMAC (disambiguation) =

Comac is the Commercial Aircraft Corporation of China.

COMAC or Comac may also refer to:

== Places ==
- Commack, New York, United States of America; a hamlet in Suffolk County, Long Island; formerly spelled as Comac
- Comac, Akokan, Niger; a mine

== People ==
- Commander, Military Airlift Command (COMAC), a position in the USAF; see List of United States Air Force four-star generals
- Commissioner for Administrative Complaints (COMAC), Office of the Unofficial Members of the Executive and Legislative Councils, Government of Hong Kong, British Empire

=== Persons ===
- Linda Comac, co-author of the 1992 book Sharks Don't Get Cancer
- Comac Sharvin, an Irish golfer at the 2014 and 2015 European Amateur Team Championship

== Groups, organizations ==
- Comac (youth movement) ("Change, Optimism, Marxism, Activism, Creativity"), a Belgian socialist student movement
- Comac Society (est. 1789), Commack Methodist Church and Cemetery, Commack, New York, USA; a Methodist society
- COMAC (French: Comité Militaire d'Action, lit. 'Committee for Military Action'), one of the organs of the French Resistance during World War II in France

== Other uses ==
- IBM 9900 Special Index Analyzer or COMAC (Continuous Multiple Access Comparator); see List of IBM products
