= Elliot Tiber =

American artist, professor, and screenwriter (1935–2016)

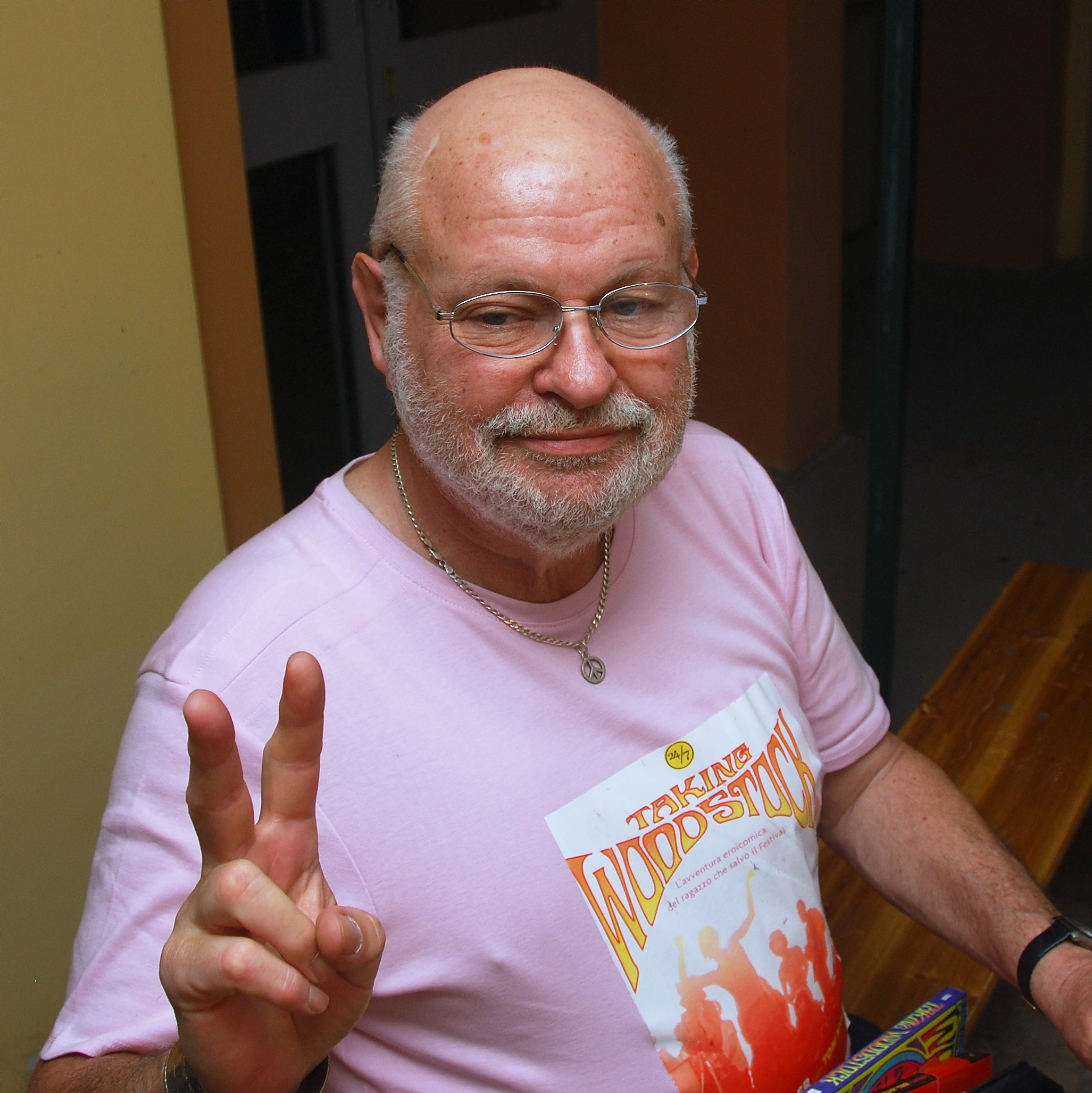
- Born: Eliyahu Teichberg; April 15, 1935; Bensonhurst, Brooklyn, New York
- Died: August 3, 2016 (aged 81); Boca Raton, Florida
- Education: Brooklyn College; Hunter College (BFA); Pratt Institute (MFA)

Elliot Michael Tiber (born Eliyahu Teichberg; April 15, 1935 – August 3, 2016) was an artist, professor, and screenwriter who wrote a memoir about the Woodstock Festival held in Bethel, New York in 1969. He claimed responsibility for the relocation of the festival after a permit for it was withdrawn by the zoning board of a nearby town.

Tiber's 2007 memoir Taking Woodstock, written with Tom Monte, was adapted into a film of the same name by Ang Lee. The film opened in the United States in August 2009. In the film, Tiber is portrayed by comedian Demetri Martin.

== Early and personal life ==
Tiber was born as Eliyahu Teichberg, in Bensonhurst, Brooklyn, New York. His family moved to White Lake in Bethel in 1955 where they acquired a rooming house that they expanded into a motel, called the El Monaco Motel, at the intersection of New York Route 17B and New York Route 55 near the southeast shore of White Lake. He was Jewish. He changed his name before enrolling in college.

Tiber graduated from Midwood High School in Brooklyn, and attended Brooklyn College and received a BFA from Hunter College. He was in the MFA program at Pratt Institute.

Tiber died in August 2016 at the age of 81 in Boca Raton, Florida from complications of a stroke.

== Taking Woodstock ==
In his book Taking Woodstock: A True Story of a Riot, a Concert and a Life, Tiber says he was present at the Stonewall Riots on June 28, 1969, and that he had a part in bringing the Woodstock Festival to Bethel, New York on August 15–17, 1969.

Tiber said he led a closeted life in Bethel in the early 1960s as he spent time managing his parents' El Monaco Motel, serving as president of the Bethel Chamber of Commerce, and, at the same time, participating in the gay scene in New York, where he lived.

According to Taking Woodstock, Tiber read that Wallkill, Orange County, New York had on July 15, 1969–30 days before the music festival was to start—pulled the plug on the planned Woodstock Festival at the Mills Industrial Park northeast of Middletown, New York.

Tiber says in the book that he had a permit for the White Lake Music and Arts Festival, a planned chamber music event at his motel. He contacted Michael Lang on or about July 18 and pitched the idea of having the festival on 15 acres (61,000 m^{2}) along the edge of White Lake by the motel.

According to Taking Woodstock, when Lang said the motel property was too small, Tiber introduced the Woodstock festival producers to dairy farmer Max Yasgur, and helped facilitate the deal.

Lang, however, says that Tiber referred him to a local real estate salesman, and that the salesman drove Lang, without Tiber, to Yasgur's farm. Sam Yasgur, son of Max Yasgur, agrees with Lang's version, and said that his mother, who is still alive, said that Max did not know Tiber. Artie Kornfeld, a Woodstock organizer, has said he found out about Yasgur's farm from his own sources.

The motel later became an Italian restaurant before being torn down in 2004. It is now marked by a clock tower welcoming people to White Lake.

Tiber left Bethel shortly after Woodstock and soon moved to Los Angeles, where he became a movie set designer.

== Screenwriter ==
His 1970s book, Rue Haute, was made into a French-language film directed by his domestic partner, André Ernotte. It was Belgium's entry for the 49th Academy Awards Best Foreign Language Film in 1977. The book was released in English in the United States in 1977 under the name High Street.

== Teaching career ==
He taught creative writing at New School University, fine art at Hunter College, and art design history at the New York Institute of Technology.

== Books ==
- High Street, Avon (1977)
- Taking Woodstock: A True Story of a Riot, a Concert and a Life (with Tom Monte), Square One Publishers (June 15, 2007), ISBN 0-7570-0293-5.
- Palm Trees on the Hudson (2010)
- After Woodstock, Square One Publishers (March 2, 2015), ISBN 0-7570-0392-3.
