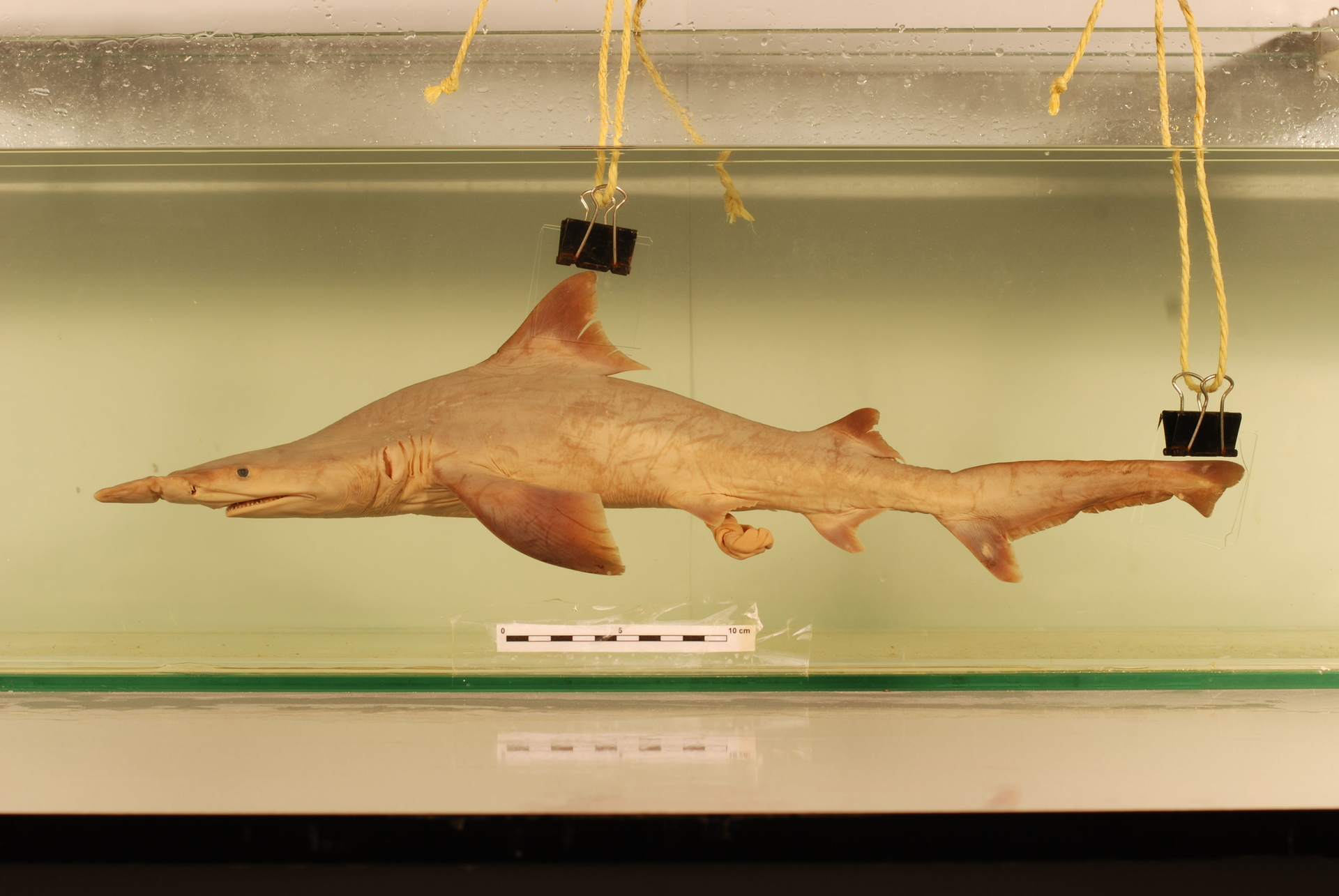

Conservation status
- Critically Endangered (IUCN 3.1)

Scientific classification
- Kingdom: Animalia
- Phylum: Chordata
- Class: Chondrichthyes
- Subclass: Elasmobranchii
- Division: Selachii
- Order: Carcharhiniformes
- Family: Carcharhinidae
- Genus: Carcharhinus
- Species: C. oxyrhynchus

Binomial name
- Carcharhinus oxyrhynchus (J. P. Müller & Henle, 1839)
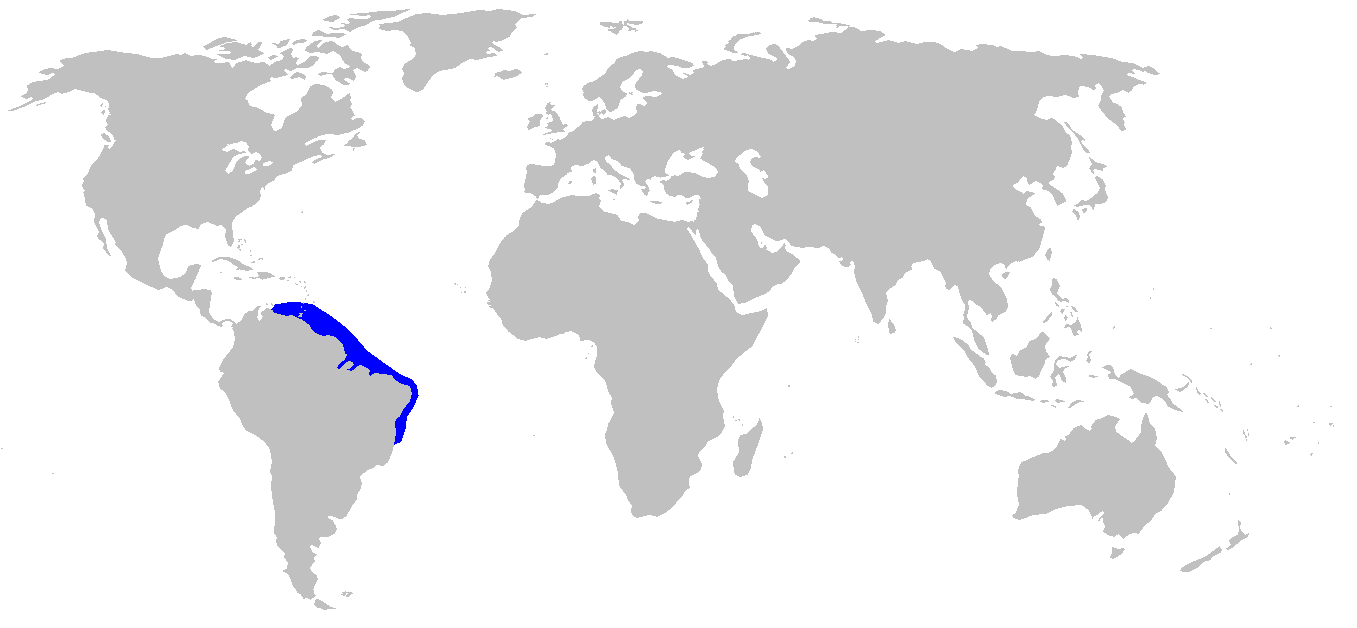
- Range of the daggernose shark

Synonyms
- Carcharias oxyrhynchus Müller & Henle, 1839; Isogomphodon oxyrhynchus

= Daggernose shark =

Species of shark

The daggernose shark (Carcharhinus oxyrhynchus) is a little-known species of requiem shark, in the family Carcharhinidae. It inhabits shallow tropical waters off northeastern South America, from Trinidad to northern Brazil, favoring muddy habitats such as mangroves, estuaries, and river mouths, though it is intolerant of fresh water. A relatively small shark typically reaching 1.5 m (4.9 ft) in length, the daggernose shark is unmistakable for its elongated, flattened, and pointed snout, tiny eyes, and large paddle-shaped pectoral fins.

Daggernose sharks are predators of small schooling fishes. Its reproduction is viviparous, with females giving birth to 2–8 pups every other year during the rainy season; this species is capable of shifting the timing of its reproductive cycle by several months in response to the environment. Harmless to humans, the daggernose shark is caught for food and as bycatch in artisanal and commercial fisheries. Limited in range and slow-reproducing, it has been assessed as Critically Endangered by the International Union for Conservation of Nature in light of a steep population decline in recent years. The current population is believed to be extremely low, with no more than 250 individuals believed to be in existence as of 2023. Indeed, it may even be in reproductive collapse, in which case it will likely become extinct in the near future.

== Taxonomy and phylogeny ==
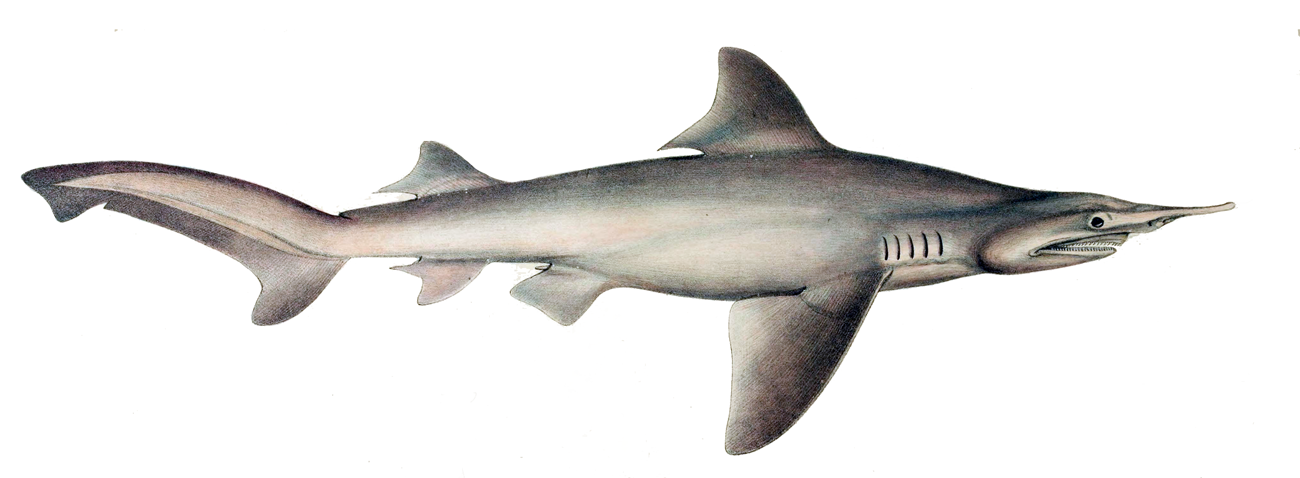
The illustration that accompanied Müller and Henle's original description.

The first scientific description of the daggernose shark, as Carcharias oxyrhynchus, was published by German biologists Johannes Peter Müller and Friedrich Gustav Jakob Henle in their 1839 Systematische Beschreibung der Plagiostomen. They chose the specific epithet oxyrhynchus, from the Greek oxys ("sharp" or "pointed") and rhynchos ("nose"). In 1862, American ichthyologist Theodore Gill coined the genus Isogomphodon for this species, from the Greek isos ("equal"), gomphos ("nail" or "peg"), and odous ("tooth"). However, Isogomphodon was subsequently relegated to being a synonym of Carcharhinus, until it was resurrected by shark authority Stewart Springer in 1950.

In 2023, a phylogenetic study found the daggernose shark to be deeply nested within the genus Carcharhinus, as the sister species to the smalltail shark (C. porosus), another western Atlantic Carcharhinus species. The unusual elongated snout, which is shared by no other species within Carcharhinus, was found to be a derived trait adapted to living in the muddy, clouded waters produced by the plume of the Amazon River. For this reason, the species was reclassified as Carcharhinus oxyrhynchus.

An extinct apparent relative, †Carcharhinus acuarius (Probst, 1879) (formerly Isogomphodon acuarius), has been identified from the Middle Eocene (45 Ma) of Germany on the basis of similar teeth. However, this clashes with phylogenetic estimates which have found the divergence of the daggernose and smalltail sharks to only date to the Middle Miocene.

== Distribution and habitat ==
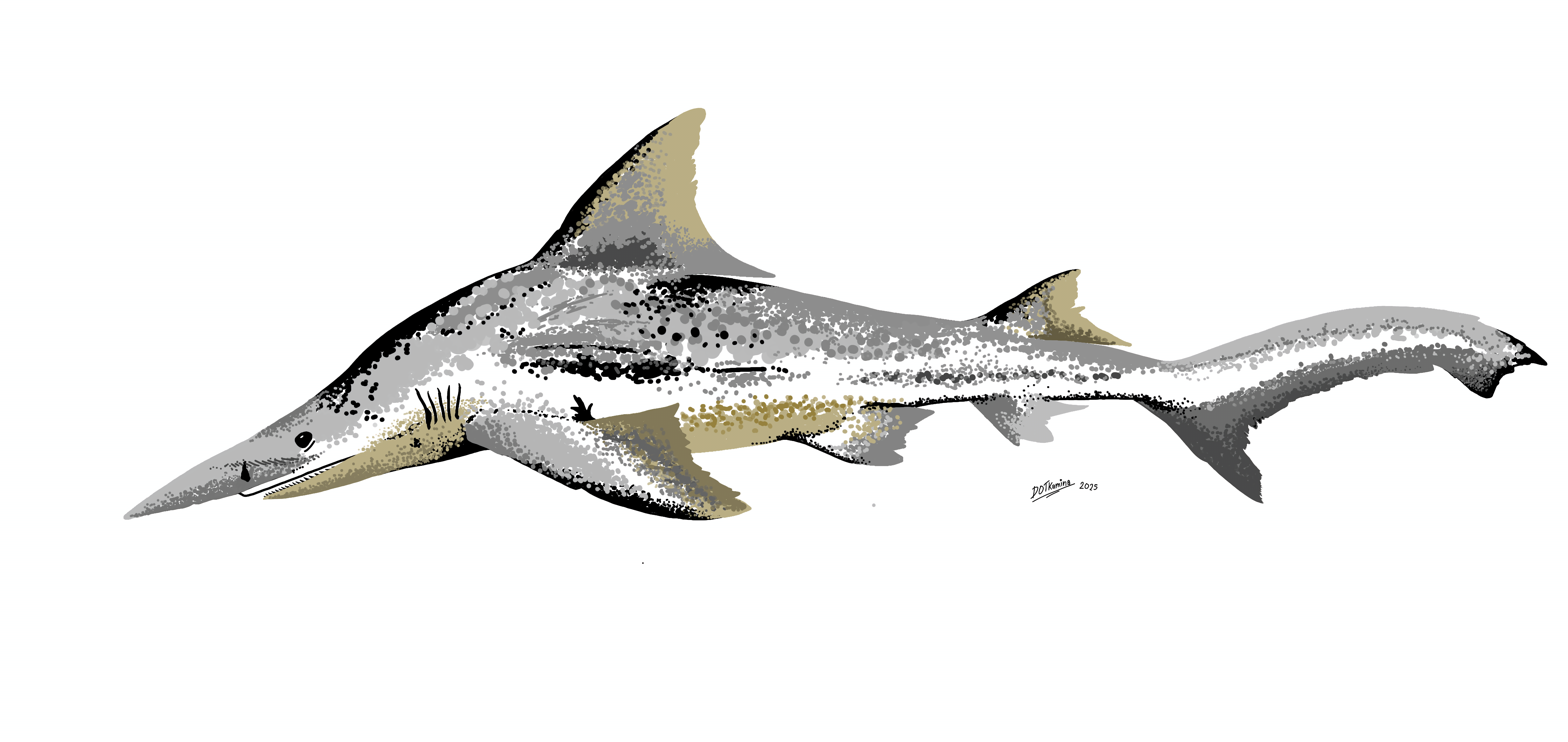
Illustration of daggernose shark.

The daggernose shark is found along the northeastern coast of South America, off Trinidad, Guyana, Suriname, French Guiana, and northern Brazil. It reportedly occurs as far south as Valença in the central Brazilian state of Bahia, though fishery surveys have not detected this species in the area and it is apparently unknown to local fishermen.

An inhabitant of coastal waters at a depth of 4–40 m (13–131 ft), the daggernose shark prefers highly turbid waters and decreases in number with increasing water clarity. Females tend to be found at greater depths than males. Its range encompasses a wide continental shelf with a humid tropical climate, extensive mangroves, and draining by numerous rivers including the Amazon. Water salinity in this area ranges from 20 to 34 ppt, while the tidal amplitude can measure up to 7 m (23 ft). Daggernose sharks are most common over shallow muddy banks and in estuaries and river mouths. It seems to be intolerant of low salinity, moving inshore during the dry season (June to November) and offshore during the rainy season (December to May). This species is not known to make long-distance movements, though some local seasonal movements are possible.

== Description ==
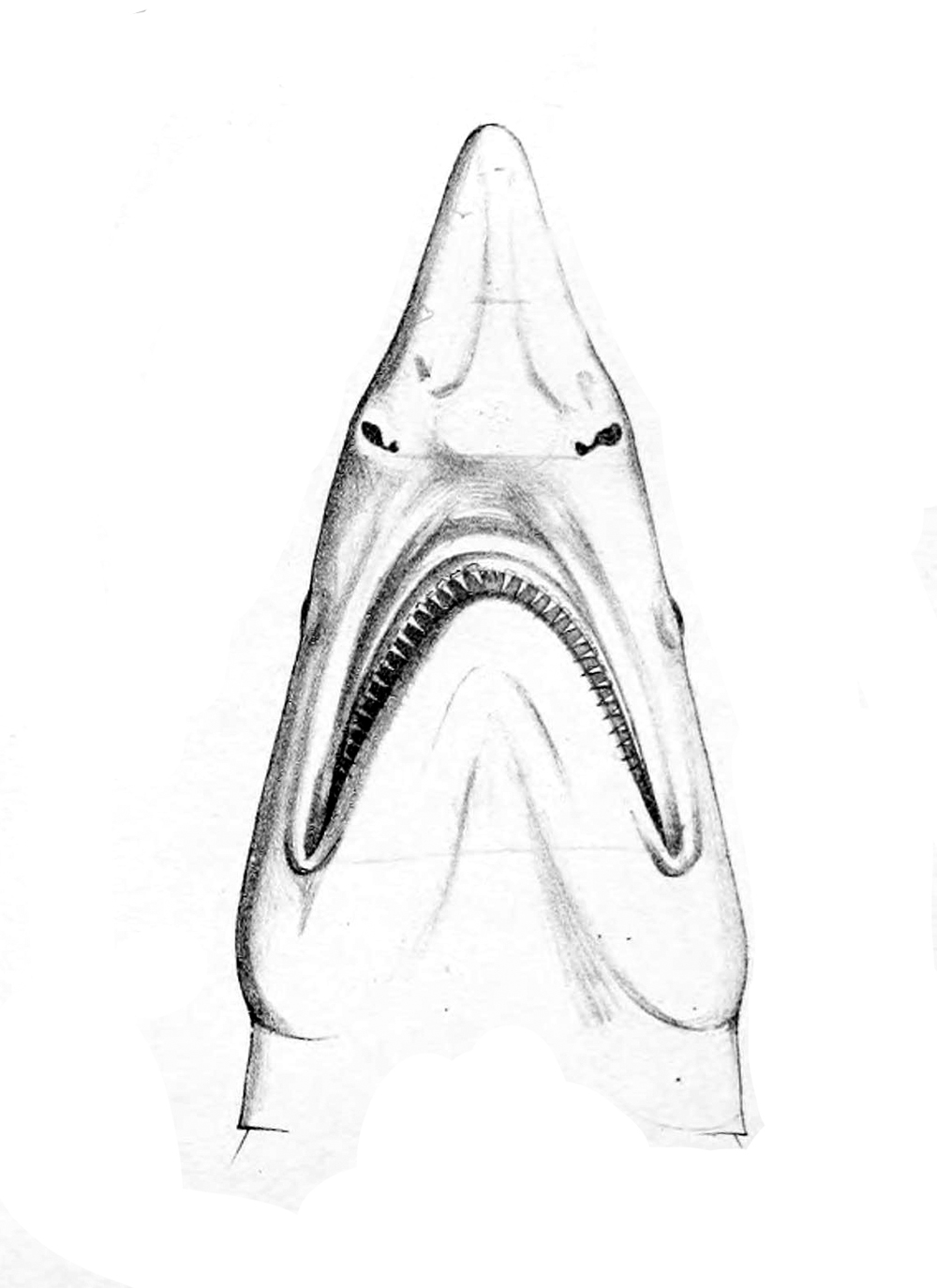
Ventral view of head.

As its common name suggests, the daggernose shark has a very long, flattened snout with a pointed tip and an acutely triangular profile from above. The eyes are circular and minute in size, with nictitating membranes (a protective third eyelid). The nostrils are small, without prominent nasal skin flaps. There are short but deep furrows at the corners of the mouth on both jaws. The tooth rows number 49–60 and 49–56 in the upper and lower jaws respectively. Each tooth has a single narrow, upright cusp; the upper teeth are slightly broader and flatter than the lower teeth, with serrated rather than smooth edges.

The body is robustly built, with large, broad, paddle-like pectoral fins that originate under the fifth gill slit. The first dorsal fin originates over the posterior half of the pectoral fin bases. The second dorsal fin is about half as tall as the first and located over or slightly ahead of the anal fin. The anal fin is smaller than the second dorsal fin and has a deep notch in the rear margin. The caudal fin has a well-developed lower lobe and is preceded by a crescent-shaped notch on the upper side of the caudal peduncle. The coloration is a plain gray above, sometimes with a brownish or yellowish cast, and lighter below. Males attain a length of 1.4 m (4.6 ft) and females 1.6 m (5.2 ft). There are unsubstantiated records of individuals 2.0–2.4 m (6.6–7.9 ft) long. The maximum known weight is 13 kg (29 lb).

== Biology and ecology ==
The dominant shark species within the daggernose shark's range are the smalltail shark (Carcharhinus porosus) and the bonnethead (Sphyrna tiburo). Its elongated snout and tiny eyes are likely consequences of living in murky sediment-laden waters, reflecting an adaptive emphasis on electroreception and other rostral senses rather than vision. The snout bears a superficial similarity to the goblin shark (Mitsukurina owstoni), some Apristurus catsharks, and the long-nosed chimaeras, all found in the deep sea. With long jaws and numerous small teeth, the daggernose shark is well-suited for capturing the small schooling fishes that comprise most of its diet. Known prey taken include herring, anchovies, catfish, and croakers.

The daggernose shark is viviparous; once the developing embryos exhaust their supply of yolk, the depleted yolk sac is converted into a placental connection through which the mother delivers sustenance. Females give birth to litters of 2–8 pups every other year, following a year-long gestation period. There is no correlation between female size and number of offspring. Mating and parturition take place over a roughly six-month period from the beginning to the end of the rainy season. However, the daggernose shark is capable of shifting the timing of its reproductive cycle by at least four months, possibly in response to varying environmental conditions. Females move into shallow coastal nurseries to give birth; one important nursery exists off Brazilian state of Maranhão.

Newly born daggernose sharks measure 38–43 cm (15–17 in) in length. Males mature at 103 cm (41 in) long, corresponding to an age of 5–6 years, while females mature at 115 cm (45 in) long, corresponding to an age of 6–7 years. The lifespan of males has been measured at up to 7 years, and females 12 years; extrapolating from growth rates suggest that the largest known males and females may be 12 and 20 years old respectively.

== Human interactions ==
The daggernose shark poses little danger to humans due to its small size and teeth. This shark is caught in small numbers by subsistence fishers in Trinidad, Guyana, Suriname, and French Guiana. It also comprises about one-tenth of the catch of a northern Brazil floating gillnet fishery targeting Serra Spanish mackerel (Scomberomorus brasiliensis) and Acoupa weakfish (Cynoscion acoupa), which operates in estuaries during the dry season. This shark is often found in markets, but is not highly regarded as a food fish. The International Union for Conservation of Nature (IUCN) has assessed this species as Critically Endangered, as it has a limited distribution and is highly susceptible to overfishing due to its low reproductive rate. The daggernose shark has declined over 90% over the past decade off Brazil, and similar declines have likely also occurred elsewhere in its range as fishing pressure in the region continues to grow more intense. The IUCN has urgently recommended the implementation of conservation schemes and the expansion of fishery monitoring for this species. Evidence also points to this species being on the verge of or already in reproductive collapse.

== See also ==
- List of sharks
