= Square One Publishers =

American publishing company

- Parent company: Globe Pequot Publishing Group
- Founded: 2000
- Founder: Rudy Shur
- Country of origin: United States
- Headquarters location: Garden City Park, New York
- Publication types: Books
- Fiction genres: Adult non-fiction
- Official website: www.globepequot.com/imprint/square-one/

Square One Publishers is an American publishing company founded in 2000 by Rubin "Rudy" Shur, a former Avery Publishing president. Shur is the Chief Executive Officer. Their offices are located on Herricks Road in Garden City Park, New York.

In April 2016, Square One Publishers acquired Ocean Publishing, located in Flageler Beach, Florida, with the intent to keep the Ocean Publishing name as an imprint. Later that year, Square One Publishers acquired the rights to five novels by James Misko, marking the entry into fictional titles.

As of 2026, Square One is a trade imprint of Globe Pequot Publishing Group.

== Partial bibliography ==
- The Acid Alkaline Food Guide, Susan Brown & Larry Trivieri (2013) ISBN 978-0757003936
- Bushido, The Way of the Samurai, Yamamoto Tsunetomo, Translated by Justin F. Stone and Minoru Tanaka, 2003, ISBN 0-7570-0026-6
- Dressed to Kill: The Link between Breast Cancer and Bras, Sydney Ross Singer and Soma Grismaijer (2017) ISBN 978-0757004629
- How Smart Is Your Baby?, Glenn Doman & Janet Doman (2006) ISBN 978-0757001949
- How to Read a Person Like a Book, Gerard Nierenberg, Henry Calero, & Gabriel Grayson (2010) ISBN 978-0757003141
- Love Tactics, Thomas McKnight & Robert Phillips (2002) ISBN 978-0757000379
- Pat Cooper: How Dare You Say How Dare Me!, Rich Herschlag (2010) ISBN 978-0757003639
- Pea in a Pod, Linda Goldberg (2011) ISBN 978-0757003479
- Suicide by Sugar, Nancy Appleton (2008) ISBN 978-0757003066
- Taking Woodstock: A True Story of a Riot, a Concert and a Life, Elliot Tiber with Tom Monte (2007) ISBN 0-7570-0293-5
- After Woodstock: The True Story of a Belgian Movie, an Israeli Wedding, and a Manhattan Breakdown, Elliot Tiber (2015) ISBN 0-7570-0392-3
- Talking With Your Hands, Listening With Your Eyes, Gabriel Grayson (2003) ISBN 978-0757000072
- The Urban Treasure Hunter, Michael Chaplan (2004) ISBN 978-0757000904
- What You Must Know About Vitamins, Minerals, Herbs & More, Pamela Wartian Smith (2007) ISBN 978-0757002335

== See also ==
- Doubleday, Page & Company
- Dover Publications
