= Avery Publishing =

Book publishing imprint of the Penguin Group

- Parent company: Penguin Random House
- Founded: 1976
- Founder: Rudy Shur and Lee Solomon
- Country of origin: United States
- Headquarters location: New York City
- Publication types: Books
- Official website: penguin.com

Avery Publishing is a book publishing imprint of the Penguin Group, headquartered in New York City, in the United States.

== Description ==
Avery was founded as an independent publisher in 1976 by childhood friends Rudy Shur and Lee Solomon. It was purchased by Penguin in 1999. Their offices were located at one time in Garden City, New York, home to other publisher's offices.

Penguin merged the Gotham Books and Hudson Street Press imprints into Avery in 2015.

As of 2014, the president was veteran publisher William Shinker.

=== Etymology ===
The name of Avery Publishing is a nod to Avery Avenue in Flushing, Queens – the street on which Shur and Solomon grew up.

== Partial bibliography ==
- Foods That Heal: A Guide to Understanding and Using the Healing Powers of Natural Foods, Bernard Jensen (1989) ISBN 0895294052
- Confessions of a Kamikaze Cowboy: A True Story of Discovery, Acting, Health, Illness, Recovery, and Life, Dirk Benedict (1991) ISBN 0895294796
- Dressed to Kill: The Link between Breast Cancer and Bras, Sydney Ross Singer and Soma Grismaijer (1995) ISBN 0895296640, 9780895296641
- When Enough is Enough: A Comprehensive Guide to Successful Intervention, Candy Finnigan (2008) ISBN 978-1583332979
- Sharks Don't Get Cancer, I. William Lane (1992)
- NeuroTribes, Steve Silberman (Samuel Johnson Prize, 2015)

== See also ==
- Doubleday, Page & Company
- Dover Publications
- Square One Publishers
