= Demetri Martin. Person. =

- Country of origin: United States
- Original language: English

Original release
- Network: Comedy Central
- Release: January 14, 2007

Demetri Martin. Person. is a 2007 Comedy Central special featuring comedian Demetri Martin. It was directed by Jay Karas and filmed at The Paramount Theatre in Austin, Texas. It first aired on January 14, 2007, and a DVD was released by Paramount Home Video and Comedy Central on September 4, 2007.

== Segments ==
=== Intro ===
Martin sings a song about himself while walking backstage and showing his ambidextrous skills.

=== Large Pad/Findings ===
Martin uses his Large Pad to show some research or "Findings" with his Pointer. Among the topics discussed are "How Short a Person Is vs. How Drunk a Person Is and How Funny It Is", "Breakdown of Hummer Owners", "How Funny I Find Farts by Location", "Flow Chart Of Clowns", "People Who Live in Glass Houses Shouldn't Throw Stones", "Pony Tail Locations", "A Pie Chart About Procrastination" (actually an empty circle), "The Cuteness of a Girl vs. How Interested I Am in Hearing About How Intuitive Her Cat Is", "My Ability To Draw Mountains Over Time", "State Shapes", "Half Full vs. Half Empty Based on Contents of Glass", and "Pillow Fights".

=== Hey Porcupines ===
In this animation made by Martin using felt and chalkboards, Martin thinks about porcupines.

=== The Jokes with Piano ===
Martin plays some blues on the piano and sings some one liners. This is also the introduction of the recurring theme of "unnecessary bells".

=== The Jokes with Guitar and Harmonica ===
Martin tells some jokes while playing guitar and harmonica.

=== Art ===
Martin showcases some of his funny drawings accompanied by music on piano and harmonica.

=== Mythical Creatures ===
In this animated segment, Martin plays Professor Irwin Glands, a professor in "mythozoology". He discusses some lesser known mythical creatures, such as the "Vertimaid", the "Zebratard", and the "RexFidoBuster".

=== Getting the Harmonica the Cool Way ===
Martin is about to tell some jokes accompanied by his guitar when he realizes he doesn't have the harmonica rack around his neck and left it on top of the piano, so he gets up out of his chair and gets it "the cool way".

=== Where My Jokes Go ===
Similar to the end of his Comedy Central Presents special where he talked about where his jokes came from, Martin discusses/hypothesizes where his jokes go while some friends and relatives of his act them out. In between, he tells some more jokes.
