= Dean (film) =

- Theatrical release poster
- Directed by: Demetri Martin
- Written by: Demetri Martin
- Produced by: Giles Andrew; Elliott Watson; Jessica Latham; Demetri Martin; Charles James Denton
- Starring: Demetri Martin; Kevin Kline; Gillian Jacobs; Rory Scovel; Christine Woods; Ginger Gonzaga; Peter Scolari; Briga Heelan; Reid Scott; Mary Steenburgen
- Cinematography: Mark Schwartzband
- Edited by: Josh Salzberg
- Production companies: Honora; Abbolita Productions
- Distributed by: CBS Films (United States); Universal Pictures (International)
- Release dates: April 16, 2016 (Tribeca Film Festival); June 2, 2017 (United States)
- Running time: 93 minutes
- Country: United States
- Language: English
- Budget: $950,000
- Box office: $254,536

Dean is a 2016 American comedy-drama film written and directed by Demetri Martin and produced by Honora Productions. The film stars Martin, Gillian Jacobs and Kevin Kline. Martin plays the title character, Dean, who is a published cartoon artist who draws in a simple style with felt pen and Bristol board. The drawings in the film are done by Martin.

The film premiered at the Tribeca Film Festival on April 16, 2016 and was released in the United States on June 2, 2017. It received mixed to positive reviews.

== Plot ==
Dean lives in Brooklyn and has recently lost his mother. His father, Robert, is having difficulty adjusting to being alone. Dean's ex-fiancée Michelle tries to give back the ring, as Dean has "un-proposed", but he refuses.

Dean's best friend from college Brett is getting married, and is actually the "second best" man behind Kevin. Dean's cat-obsessed friend Eric has also come from Los Angeles for the wedding. At the wedding, Dean's ex distracts him, and he drops the wedding ring. At the reception, Dean begins his best man speech, but gets interrupted by Kevin, who tries to assault him.

The next morning, Dean's dad announces he is selling the house. To postpone, Dean uses an excuse of an LA trip to meet with an ad agency who want to use his drawings. Frustrated by Dean's lack of engagement, his father has already brought in realtors Carol and Patrick, who he incorrectly assumes are married. Later Robert sees Carol's online dating profile on her PC, and he uses it to flirt with her.

Meanwhile the advertising agency puts Dean off by their idea to use his work in a deodorant ad. Dean excuses himself and leaves. Calling his LA friends, including Becca and Eric, he goes to a party, where he meets Nicky. He is immediately attracted to her and pursues her clumsily, despite her friend Jill blocking him. He gives Nicky his number, written on small notebook paper in a "twentieth-century way."

As Dean is flying out, Nicky's text invites him to the beach, so he gets off the plane and heads to meet her. Finding each other, they go to dinner. He kisses her at the end of the night. After an unsuccessful meetup with Nicky and Jill at an art gallery, Nicky tells Dean that she and Jill are going to San Francisco, and he asks if he and Eric can tag along. Just before a hike, Eric gets a call about a cat emergency and insists on flying home immediately.

Robert and Carol have been dating in New York. Returning from a play, Carol invites him to her apartment for coffee, but he declines because he is "still married." Meanwhile, Nicky spends the night with Dean, where he confesses he thinks he is in love with her, then mentions the failed engagement and his mother dying. In the morning, Nicky leaves him a "twentieth-century style" letter at the front desk, apologizing for not telling him she is separated from a current husband.

Dean returns to New York and finishes his book. Robert now lives in an apartment in the city. Dean apologizes for not being there, and finally reconciles with his dad. Dean sends a message and signed copy of his book to Eric, telling him of what he's learned about loss and healing. Robert sees Carol walking in his neighborhood, and they walk on together.

== Cast ==
- Demetri Martin as Dean Anderson
- Kevin Kline as Robert Anderson
- Gillian Jacobs as Nicky Hoey
- Rory Scovel as Eric
- Christine Woods as Michelle
- Ginger Gonzaga as Jill
- Peter Scolari as Patrick
- Briga Heelan as Becca
- Reid Scott as Brett Smith
- Mary Steenburgen as Carol
- Barry Rothbart as Kevin
- Nancy Lenehan as Mom's Voice
- Beck Bennett as Trevor
- Andrew Santino as Chad
- Kate Berlant as Naomi

Comedian H. Jon Benjamin has an uncredited cameo as a phone salesman.

== Reception ==
On review aggregator Rotten Tomatoes, the film holds an approval rating of 67% based on 48 reviews, with an average rating of 6.13/10. The site's critical consensus reads, "Dean's light touch with heavy themes -- and a talented cast led by writer-director-star Demetri Martin -- help compensate for the familiar story's narrative drift." On Metacritic, the film holds a score of 58 out of 100, based on 19 critics, indicating "mixed or average" reviews.

Based in part on Martin's own experience losing his father at age 20 to kidney cancer that may have been caused by a nearby Superfund site, Dean received the prize for Best Narrative Feature from the Tribeca Film Festival in 2016, and the Tribeca jury praised the film for "breathing new life into a well-worn genre." John DeFore of The Hollywood Reporter noted that the film, a story of grief, generally feels less meta than Martin's comedy work, and he opined that Martin effectively pulls the audience "along for the ride." He continues, "If grief dramedies are as much a rite of passage as romantic rebounds, it's exciting to imagine what Martin's next step as a filmmaker will look like." Critiques of the film focused on the movie's similarity to others in the genre, at some points failing to differentiate itself from its more successful influences.

It ran four weeks in theaters, with a limited distribution. Although not a box-office bomb, it did not recoup the original investment in the theatrical run.
