= Demetri Martin =

American comedian, actor, artist, musician, writer, and humorist (born 1973)

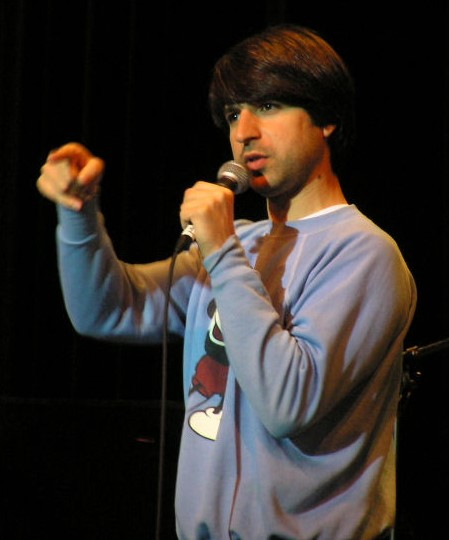
- Martin performing in April 2007
- Born: May 25, 1973 (age 53); New York City, U.S.
- Education: Yale University; New York University
- Spouses: Jen Martin (m. 1998; div. 2000) Rachael Beame (m. 2012)
- Children: 2

Comedy career
- Years active: 1997–present
- Medium: Stand-up; television; film
- Genres: Surreal humor; musical comedy; sketch comedy; alternative comedy; observational comedy; wit/word play
- Subjects: Everyday life; American culture
- Website: demetrimartin.com

Demetri Evan Martin (Greek: Δημήτριος Ευάγγελος Μάρτιν, Dimitrios Evangelos Martin; born May 25, 1973) is an American comedian, actor, writer, director, cartoonist, filmmaker, and musician. He was a contributor on The Daily Show, where he was the Senior Youth Correspondent from 2005 to 2008. In stand-up, he is known for his deadpan delivery, playing his guitar for jokes, and his satirical cartoons. He hosted and starred in Comedy Central sketch series Important Things With Demetri Martin (2009–2010). Martin has appeared in several films such as Taking Woodstock (2009) and made his directorial debut in Dean, which he also starred in. He starred as Ice Bear in Cartoon Network's We Bare Bears and is currently the narrator of its prequel spinoff We Baby Bears.

== Early life ==
Martin was born into a Greek-American family in New York City on May 25, 1973, the son of Lillian (1951–2019), a dietician, and Greek Orthodox priest Dean C. Martin (1948–1994). His grandparents migrated from Sparta and Crete. He grew up in Toms River, New Jersey, and has a younger brother named Spyro and a younger sister named Christene. Martin was an altar boy at church and credited his exposure to humor to his time attending as an altar boy. He credits Woody Allen and Steven Wright as major comedic influences. He was also part of a Hellenic Dance Troupe in New Jersey. As a teenager, he worked at his family's diner in Beachwood near the Jersey Shore. He attended Toms River High School North and graduated in 1991.

Martin graduated from Yale University in 1995 with a B.A in History. During his time there, he wrote a 224-word poem as a project for a fractal geometry class, which became a well-known palindromic poem. He was also a member of the Anti-Gravity Society, whose members juggle objects on Sunday evenings on Yale's Old Campus.

Although Martin was admitted to Harvard Law School, he instead decided to attend New York University School of Law upon receiving a full scholarship. Martin withdrew from law school before the start of his final year, opting to pursue comedy over obtaining his Juris Doctor degree.

== Career ==
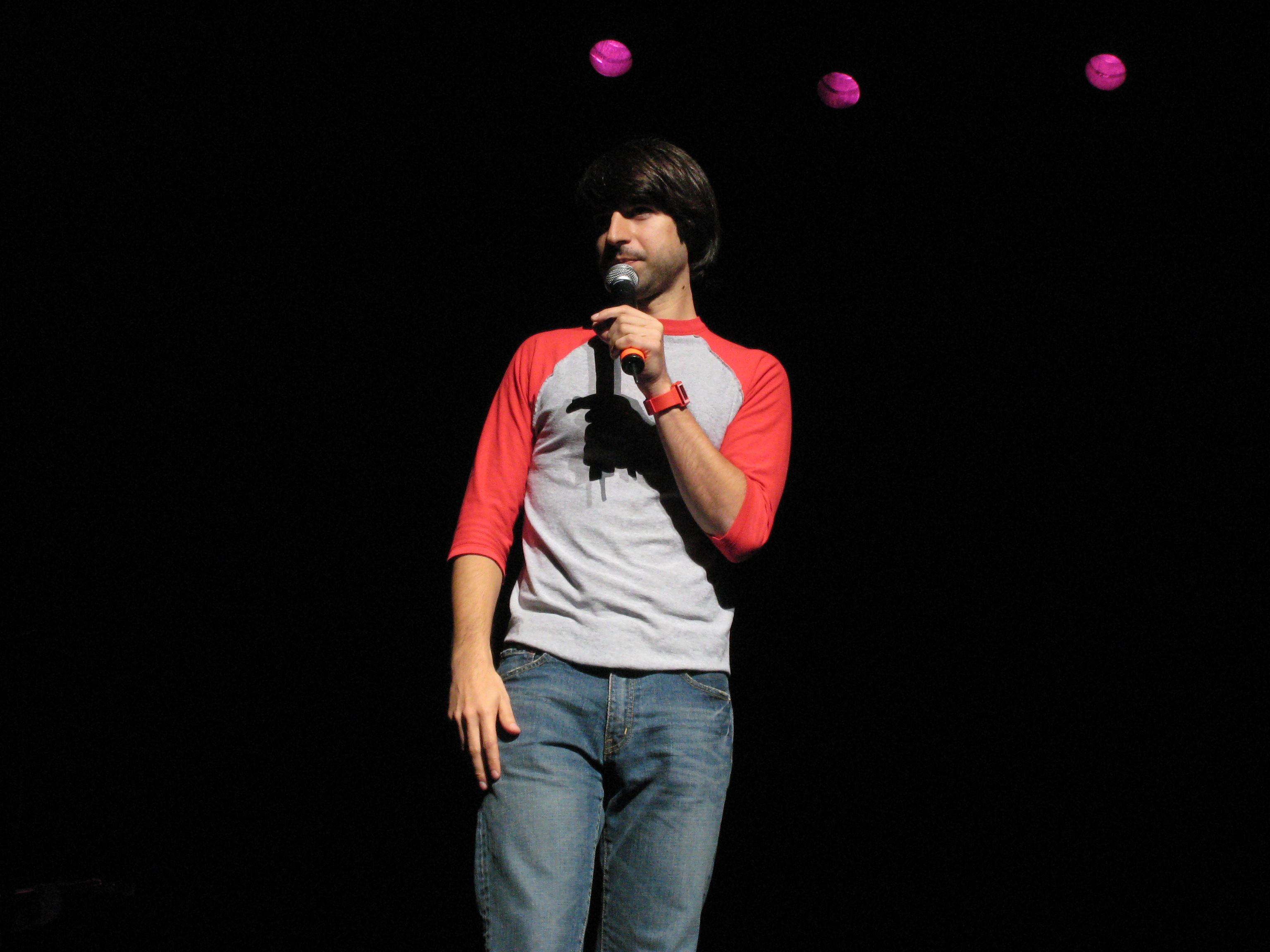
Martin doing standup in 2007

Shortly after leaving law school, Martin started performing stand-up in the summer of 1997. He became an intern on The Daily Show around 1997 between the first and second seasons and in 2001 he had a set featured on the NBC late night stand-up comedy showcase Late Friday. In 2001, Martin caught his first big break in stand-up comedy when he appeared on Comedy Central's stand-up showcase Premium Blend. At the 2003 Edinburgh Festival Fringe he won the Perrier Award with his show If I.... The show was turned into a BBC television special in 2004. From 2003 to 2004, Martin wrote for Late Night with Conan O'Brien. In 2004, Martin had his own Comedy Central Presents stand-up special. His special was divided into three parts. In the first, he performed in a traditional stand-up comedy fashion. In the second segment, he used humorous drawings as visual aids, which would serve either as the punchline or a background. During the third segment, he played the guitar and put on a pseudo-play where he would strum his guitar while alternating between playing harmonica and talking; some of his comedian friends, wearing fairy and dragon costumes, acted according to the story he was telling, detailing the magical land from where his jokes came. Martin's mother and grandmother also appeared.

Starting in late 2005, he was credited as a contributor on The Daily Show, on which he appeared as the named "Senior Youth Correspondent" and hosted a segment called "Trendspotting". He used this segment to talk about so-called hip trends among youth such as hookahs, wine, guerilla marketing and Xbox 360. A piece about social networking featured his profile on Myspace. Martin officially became the Youth Correspondent on "The Daily Show", calling his segment "Professional Important News with Demetri Martin". He left The Daily Show in 2014. Before starting at The Daily Show, he was offered to audition for Saturday Night Live but turned it down due to the seven year commitment.

He has recorded a comedy album titled These Are Jokes, which was released on September 26, 2006. This album also features Saturday Night Live member Will Forte and stand-up comedian Leo Allen. In 2007, he starred with Faryl Millet, a comedian and actress better known for her show Fancy Nancy's Funny Hour, in a Fountains of Wayne music video for "Someone to Love" as Seth Shapiro, and Millet as Beth Mackenzie. Both of them are characters in the song. He also starred in the video for the Travis single "Selfish Jean", in which he wears multiple T-shirts with lyrics written on them. On September 2, 2007, Martin appeared on the season finale of the HBO series Flight of the Conchords. He appeared as a keytar player named Demetri. He also had a part in the movie The Rocker (2008) starring Rainn Wilson. Martin played the part of the videographer when the band in the movie was making their first music video.

In 2009, he hosted and starred in his own television show called Important Things With Demetri Martin on Comedy Central. Later in June, it was announced his show had been renewed for a second season. The second season premiered, again on Comedy Central, on February 4, 2010. Martin has stated that Important Things will not return for a third season. Prior to completing work on his second season, Martin starred in the comedy-drama film Taking Woodstock (2009), directed by Ang Lee, which premiered at the 2009 Cannes Film Festival. In the film Martin plays Elliot Tiber, a closeted gay artist who has given up his ambitions in the city to move upstate and help his old-world Jewish family run their Catskill Mountains motel. The film is based on the book written by Tiber. On April 25, 2011, Martin released his first book, titled This Is a Book. Martin played a small role in the 2011 film Contagion.

Martin sold his movie concept Will to DreamWorks, and is expected to play a key supporting role. He will play the lead in the film Moon People, a pitch that he sold to Columbia Pictures. He also signed a blind script deal with CBS in October 2010 to produce, write, and star in his own television series. After CBS was shown the pilot for the series, they decided not to air it.

On October 2, 2012, Martin released his second comedy album entitled Demetri Martin. Standup Comedian.

Martin voices Ice Bear in the Cartoon Network series We Bare Bears, and the narrator in its spin-off series We Baby Bears. He wrote, directed, edited, and starred in the 2016 film Dean.

== Comedic style ==
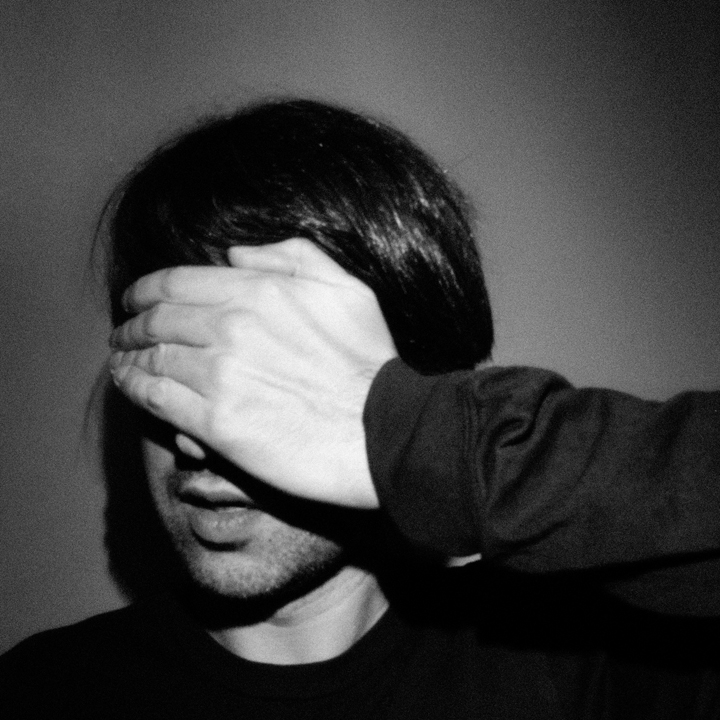
Martin in 2012

Martin is known for being an unconventional stand-up comic. He uses one-liners and drawings on a "large pad", as well as accompanying his jokes with music on either guitar, harmonica, piano, keyboard, glockenspiel, toy bells, ukulele, or tambourine, sometimes all at once. His style is often compared to Mitch Hedberg. He has cited comedian Steven Wright as an important influence (both use deadpan one-liners in their acts) as well as The Far Side cartoonist Gary Larson and Woody Allen. He has submitted cartoons to the New Yorker magazine at its invitation – and had them rejected.

Martin plays instruments on stage and has music playing in the background of his performances as a way of preventing editing of his performances to better fit for television. However, Martin has also confessed a desire to evolve his comedic style. "I love one-liners, I love jokes...but I also want to talk about how I feel. I want to talk about below-the-neck stuff. It's hard, if that's not where your head goes, it's hard to get comedy out of that...[But] I want to dig deeper, I want to connect in a different way with the audience."

== Personal life ==
According to a July 2011 interview on the podcast WTF with Marc Maron, Martin had a short-lived marriage with a former high school classmate named Jen. They began dating after high school and got married when he was at NYU Law School and she was attending NYU Medical School. This relationship was further analyzed in his one-man show Spiral Bound.

On June 1, 2012, Martin married his long-time partner Rachael Beame in Santa Monica, California. They currently reside in Los Feliz, California.

Martin has anaphylactic reactions to seafood, poultry, nuts and certain legumes.

== Works ==
=== Albums & specials ===
- If I (2004)
- These Are Jokes (2006)
- Person (2007)
- Standup Comedian. (2012)
- Live (At The Time) (2015)
- The Overthinker (2018)
- Demetri Deconstructed (2024)

=== Television shows ===
- Important Things with Demetri Martin (2009–2010)

=== Books ===
- This Is a Book, April 2011, ISBN 978-0446539708.
- 19 1/2 Stories, 2017

=== Art collections ===
- Point Your Face at This, March 2013, ISBN 978-1455512058.
- If It's Not Funny It's Art, September 2017 ISBN 978-1538729045.

=== Films ===
- Dean (2016)

== Filmography ==
| Year | Title | Role | Notes |
|---|---|---|---|
| 2002 | Late Show with David Letterman | Himself | Guest |
| 2002 | Analyze That | Personal Assistant | Credited as Demitri Martin |
| 2003 | Jimmy Kimmel Live | Himself | Guest |
| 2003 | Last Call with Carson Daly | Himself | Guest |
| 2004 | Comedy Central Presents: Demetri Martin | Himself | |
| 2004 | 12:21 | Himself | Short film Writer |
| 2004 | Late Night with Conan O'Brien | Himself | Writer |
| 2005 | Invite Them Up | Himself | Writer |
| 2007 | Someone to Love | Seth Shapiro | Fountains of Wayne music video |
| 2007 | Flight of the Conchords | Demetri | Episode: "The Third Conchord" |
| 2008 | The Rocker | Kip | |
| 2009 | Paper Heart | Himself | |
| 2009 | Post Grad | Ad Exec | |
| 2009 | Taking Woodstock | Elliot Tiber | |
| 2011 | Take Me Home Tonight | Carlos | |
| 2011 | Contagion | Dr. David Eisenberg | |
| 2011 | Conan | Himself | Guest |
| 2013 | In a World... | Louis | |
| 2014–2021 | Lunchables | Jackie | Commercials |
| 2015 | House of Lies | Ellis Hightower | |
| 2015–2019 | We Bare Bears | Ice Bear | Main role |
| 2015 | The Last Time You Had Fun | Will | |
| 2015 | Sequoia | Steve | |
| 2016 | Dean | Dean | Writer, director, producer |
| 2016 | Our Fascinating Planet | Ted Rimmarniet | Funny or Die go90 series, later on YouTube |
| 2016 | New Girl | Juror 237B / Gary Garcia | Season 5, episode 10: "Goosebumps Walkaway" |
| 2020 | Crank Yankers | Himself | Season 5, episode 19: "Adam Carolla, Illiza Shlesinger & Demetri Martin" |
| 2020 | We Bare Bears: The Movie | Ice Bear | TV film |
| 2022–present | We Baby Bears | Narrator | |
| 2022 | Weird: The Al Yankovic Story | Tiny Tim | |
| 2026 | Hoppers | Birds | Voice |

== Awards and nominations ==
| Year | Award | For | Category | Result | Other notes |
|---|---|---|---|---|---|
| 2003 | Perrier Comedy Award | If I | | Won | At the Edinburgh Festival Fringe |
| 2004 | Emmy Awards | Late Night with Conan O'Brien | Outstanding Writing for a Variety, Music, or Comedy Program | Nominated | Shared with Mike Sweeney (head writer), Chris Albers, Jose Arroyo, Andy Blitz, Kevin Dorff, Daniel J. Goor, Michael Gordon, Brian Kiley, Michael Koman, Brian McCann, Guy Nicolucci, Conan O'Brien, Allison Silverman, Robert Smigel, Brian Stack, Andrew Weinberg |
| 2005 | Writers Guild of America Award | Late Night with Conan O'Brien | Comedy/Variety (Including Talk) – Series | Won | Shared with Mike Sweeney (head writer), Chris Albers, Jose Arroyo, Andy Blitz, Kevin Dorff, Daniel J. Goor, Michael Gordon, Brian Kiley, Michael Koman, Brian McCann, Guy Nicolucci, Conan O'Brien, Allison Silverman, Robert Smigel, Brian Stack, Andrew Weinberg |
| 2006 | Barry Award | Dr. Earnest Parrot Presents Demetri Martin | | Won | Award for best show at the Melbourne International Comedy Festival |
