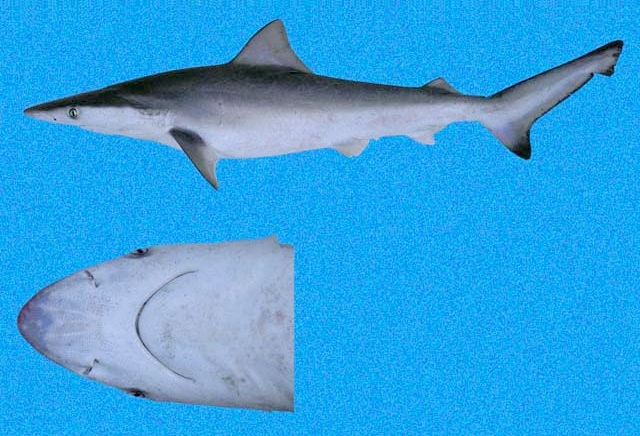

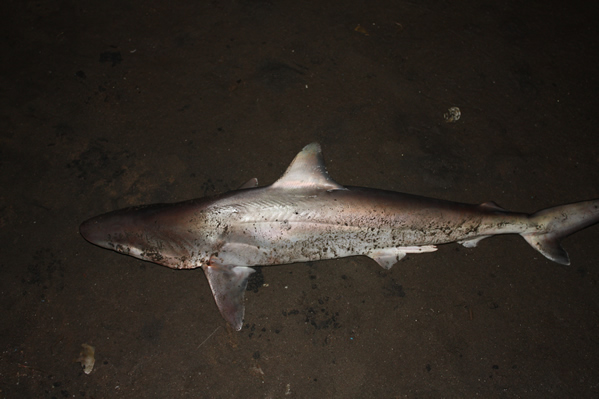

Conservation status
- Critically Endangered (IUCN 3.1)

Scientific classification
- Kingdom: Animalia
- Phylum: Chordata
- Class: Chondrichthyes
- Subclass: Elasmobranchii
- Division: Selachii
- Order: Carcharhiniformes
- Family: Carcharhinidae
- Genus: Carcharhinus
- Species: C. cerdale

Binomial name
- Carcharhinus cerdale C. H. Gilbert, 1898
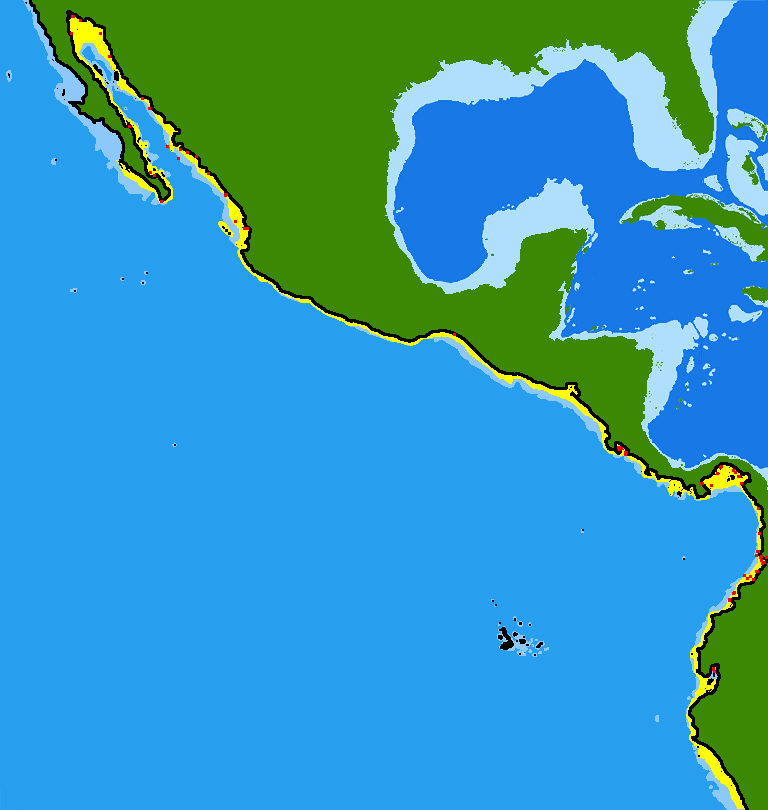

= Pacific smalltail shark =

Species of shark

The Pacific smalltail shark (Carcharhinus cerdale) is a species of requiem shark, in the family Carcharhinidae. It was described in 1898, but later mistakenly merged with Carcharhinus porosus. The mistake was corrected in 2011.

It is relatively small with skin of a light-brownish color, and it can be found in the Pacific Ocean. Not much is known about this species, and no attacks on humans from this animal have been recorded. It resembles the copper shark and a sand tiger shark, yet it is much smaller than both. It also has a small, slender body, and five gills in front of its pectoral fins.

== Diet ==
The Pacific smalltail shark feeds on rays, fish, and small invertebrates. Some adults even feed on the young of other sharks.
