= Dressed to Kill (book) =

Book by Sydney Ross Singer and Soma Grismaijer

- First edition cover
- Author: Sydney Ross Singer, Soma Grismaijer
- Language: English
- Genre: Nonfiction
- Publisher: Avery Publishing Group/Penguin Putnam (first edition); Square One Publishers (second edition)
- Publication date: 1995 (first edition), 2018 (second edition)
- Publication place: United States
- Media type: Print (Paperback)
- Pages: 192 (first edition), 188 (second edition)
- ISBN: 0-89529-664-0 (first edition); ISBN 978-0-7570-0462-9 (second edition)
- Dewey Decimal: 616.99/449071 20
- LC Class: RC280.B8 S53 1995

Dressed to Kill is a 1995 book by Sydney Ross Singer and Soma Grismaijer that claims wearing bras causes breast cancer. According to the authors, the restrictive nature of a brassiere inhibits the lymphatic system, leading to an increased risk of breast cancer. The book's claims are considered unfounded by the scientific community, and researchers have criticized the authors' methodology as faulty. Major medical organizations, including the National Institutes of Health and the American Cancer Society, have found no evidence that bra-wearing increases breast-cancer risk.

== Background ==
Singer and Grismaijer argued that bra-wearing might cause breast cancer because of a purported effect on lymphatic circulation. They believed that constriction from tightly worn bras inhibited the proper functioning of the lymphatic system and led to a buildup of fluid within the breast tissue. According to the authors, bra-induced constriction of the breast lymphatic vessels could concentrate unnamed, hypothetical toxins within the breast tissue, which might ultimately lead to cancer.

In Dressed to Kill, Singer and Grismaijer claim to have examined the bra-wearing attitudes and behaviors of over 4,700 US women in 5 major cities, and that half of the women questioned had had breast cancer. Women who had had breast cancer were asked about their bra-wearing habits prior to their diagnosis of cancer. The data presented in the book have never been published in a peer-reviewed journal, and researchers identified a number of methodological flaws in the authors' claims.

After publishing Dressed to Kill, Singer and Grismaijer wrote Get It Off!, another book about the dangers of wearing bras, and a series of other books in which they claim that sleeping on a tilted bed can prevent Alzheimer's disease and impotence; that frequent defecation and urination can prevent many conditions such as prostate enlargement and menopausal symptoms; and that high blood pressure is a "major medical scam" because "blood pressure measurements can be whatever the doctor wants them to be."

== Scientific reception ==
Medical and scientific bodies have generally not supported the book's claims about bras and breast cancer:

- The National Cancer Institute (US) states that bras have not been shown to increase a woman's risk of breast cancer.
- The American Cancer Society states, "There are no scientifically valid studies that show wearing bras of any type causes breast cancer."
- The U.S. National Institutes of Health states, "Breast implants, using antiperspirants, and wearing underwire bras do not raise your risk for breast cancer."
- In 2000, as a follow-up to misreporting of a UK study, British health professionals stated that bras cause no increase in breast cancer risk.
- A study conducted by the Fred Hutchinson Cancer Research Center found "no aspect of bra wearing, including bra cup size, recency, average number of hours a day worn, wearing a bra with an underwire, or age first began regularly wearing a bra, was associated with risks" of breast cancer. The study included detailed studies of women's lifestyle and bra-wearing habits and found no correlation between bra use and cancer.

The authors' proposal that bras block the lymphatic system which leads to accumulated toxins and cancer was likewise contradicted by scientific study. The National Institutes of Health examined cancer rates among women who had their underarm lymph nodes removed as part of melanoma treatment: "The surgery, which is known to block lymph drainage from breast tissue, did not detectably increase breast cancer rates, the study found, meaning that it is extremely unlikely that wearing a bra, which affects lymph flow minimally if at all, would do so."
