= Standup Comedian =

Release
- Original network: Comedy Central
- Original release: October 2, 2012

Standup Comedian is a 2012 Comedy Central special featuring comedian Demetri Martin. It was directed by Ryan Polito and filmed at the Skirball Center for the Performing Arts in New York City, New York. It first aired on October 2, 2012. A DVD and CD were released by Comedy Central and Comedy Central Records on October 2, 2012.

== Segments ==
=== Intro ===
Martin plays guitar as a black and white animated line drawing forms guitar strings, his signature simple caricature with an exaggerated nose, as well as his name and the title of the special. He thanks the audience for clapping and directly acknowledges the camera to thank anyone who is clapping at home before briefly discussing his tour. Martin segues from talking about his tour into some travel-related jokes. In his usual style, most of the jokes are observational comedy, though in this special, they tend to be more extended than his typical one-liners unrelated to the jokes that precede and follow them. Subject matter includes pronouns, names, and introductions.

=== Surprise party and training bra ===
Martin begins the segment with a joke about surprise parties, stating "I came home and you emerged from my furniture. You don't have to tell me how to feel." He also exchanges "surprise" with other emotions. Other subjects in this segment include cigarettes, the afterlife, dalmatians and cows, prunes, training bras, and sex.

=== Large Pad ===
Martin uses his hallmark Large Pad to perform jokes with illustrations in this segment. The first non-blank page of the pad is titled "Drawings". He displays a product design for a "Baby Silencer", a device that connects a funnel over a baby's mouth to headphones, which would show it how loud it's being and silence it. The joke is followed by a drawing of an engagement ring, which he refers to as a "Girlfriend Silencer". The next joke consist of three graphs with identical curves. The Y-axis is labeled "Fun" and the X-axis is labeled "Good At". The titles of the graphs, respectively, are "Karaoke", "Skiing", and "Reading Aloud In Class", and the graph shows that while it is somewhat entertaining to watch people who are slightly above average at these tasks perform them, it is awful to watch when the performers are average or slightly below average, but wildly entertaining to watch when the performers are profoundly untalented. When the curve takes this turn, he says "something magical starts to happen". Several other drawings utilize the infographic style, including bar graphs, diagrams, and flow charts. The next drawing depicts a Wet Floor sign and Martin observes that this sign has both a warning and a scenario. The next drawing is of a question mark, followed by jokes about the invention of the symbol. Next, he diagrams and explains the dynamic of a love triangle, followed by a diagram of polygamy, an orgy and a schematic of a "Morgy", a term Martin coined to describe a Mormon orgy. The next drawings accompany jokes about various frozen treats, such as ice cream and popsicles. He additionally shows number comparisons between cats and teeth. He also shows a drawing of an "updated elevator button". The last page in the Large Pad says "An End".

=== Alligator Goodbye - Automatic Dispensers ===
This segment begins with Martin asking audience members if they want to talk about anything, a tactic he often uses in his standup shows to incorporate improvisation and "make comedy instead of performing comedy". He hears "old people" and "crocodiles", and does more stand up based on these subjects. Some of the first one-liners in his performance appear in this segment. Other joke subjects include how saying your age before or after a statement can change its effect, the origin of the phrase "okie dokie", canine attire, and automatic bathroom appliances.

=== Some Flyers ===
Martin showcases some flyers he made to post on coffee shop bulletin boards. These include flyers that say "Learn to Play Guitar and/or With My Balls", "Tutor for Avelible", "Not Missing: Dog", "So you want to learn how to play Saxophone? I CAN STOP YOU", "Free Time Machine: Call Me Two Weeks Ago", "Tambourine Lessons", "Man with Van (and fetish)", "Free Tiny Strips of Paper", and "←- That flyer is bullshit".

=== Skipping Color Scheme and Live/Nude ===
Martin resumes regular standup on subjects including skipping, color schemes, and an advertisement for a strip club with the headline "Live Nude Girls".

=== Guitar jokes ===
The last statement in the special involves Martin playing guitar and harmonica while telling jokes. Though this method of "scoring" his jokes was intended to be used only for his Comedy Central Presents special to keep the editing team from disrupting the way he planned to tell his jokes, audiences have come to expect this segment as a regular part of his live shows. Subjects of this segment include anti-aging cream, telemarketing, bubble wrap, eyebrows, and rice milk, followed by a mini chorus of Martin repeating the phrase "rice titties".

== Bonus ==
=== Audio commentary ===
The running time of the audio commentary for this special is only 2 minutes and 45 seconds. The commentary is not intended to be taken seriously, and its short length is meant as a joke, which is evident when Martin runs out of things to say about the special shortly after the intro. Martin mostly states obvious facts such as "The stand up special is titled Standup Comedian" while the title is onscreen, "This is the beginning" as the title screen cuts to the beginning of the special, and "I'm about to tell a bunch of jokes that I prepared for the special." He eventually resorts to describing his outfit before cutting the commentary short.

=== Audio commentary commentary ===
The concept behind the audio commentary commentary is that Martin was asked to do a commentary on the commentary explaining why it was so short, though he faces the same difficulties that presented themselves with the first commentary, being that he cannot find anything to say. The confusion arising from layered audio of Martin's voice in the special, his voice-over in the commentary, and his other voice-over in the commentary commentary add to the comedic value. The audio commentary commentary runs for 2 minutes and 29 seconds.

=== Rejected concepts from the Comedy Special ===
This segment is an animated, tongue-in-cheek demonstration of some ideas Martin supposedly proposed for the special, which were rejected by Comedy Central. The first concept is called "Hovering Comedy", which involved Martin and the audience hovering during the show using tiny jet propulsion. The second concept is called "Fire (Concept)", which involves incorporating pyrotechnics into the special. The third concept is called "Mobile Device Concept", which would utilize a mobile phone on a stool on the stage showing a live feed of Martin's stand up from another room as a play on the rule against audience members using mobile devices in theaters. The fourth concept is called "Rotating Stage", using a stage that rotates over both the x and y axes.

=== A ~~Joke~~ Sad Confession ===
Martin plays sad music over a clip of a joke from the special about never having sex in high school, to give it a different tone.

=== A ~~Joke~~ Premise For a Crappy Animated Movie ===
Similar to the previous bonus feature, Martin plays whimsical music over a joke from the special about cows and dalmatians to make it seem like a movie trailer.

=== A ~~Joke~~ Scene From an Ominous, Grammar-Based Murder Mystery ===
Similar to the previous two bonus features, Martin plays sinister music over a joke from the special about silent letters to make it seem like the plot of an unconventional murder mystery.
