= Shark cartilage =

Pseudoscientific diet supplement

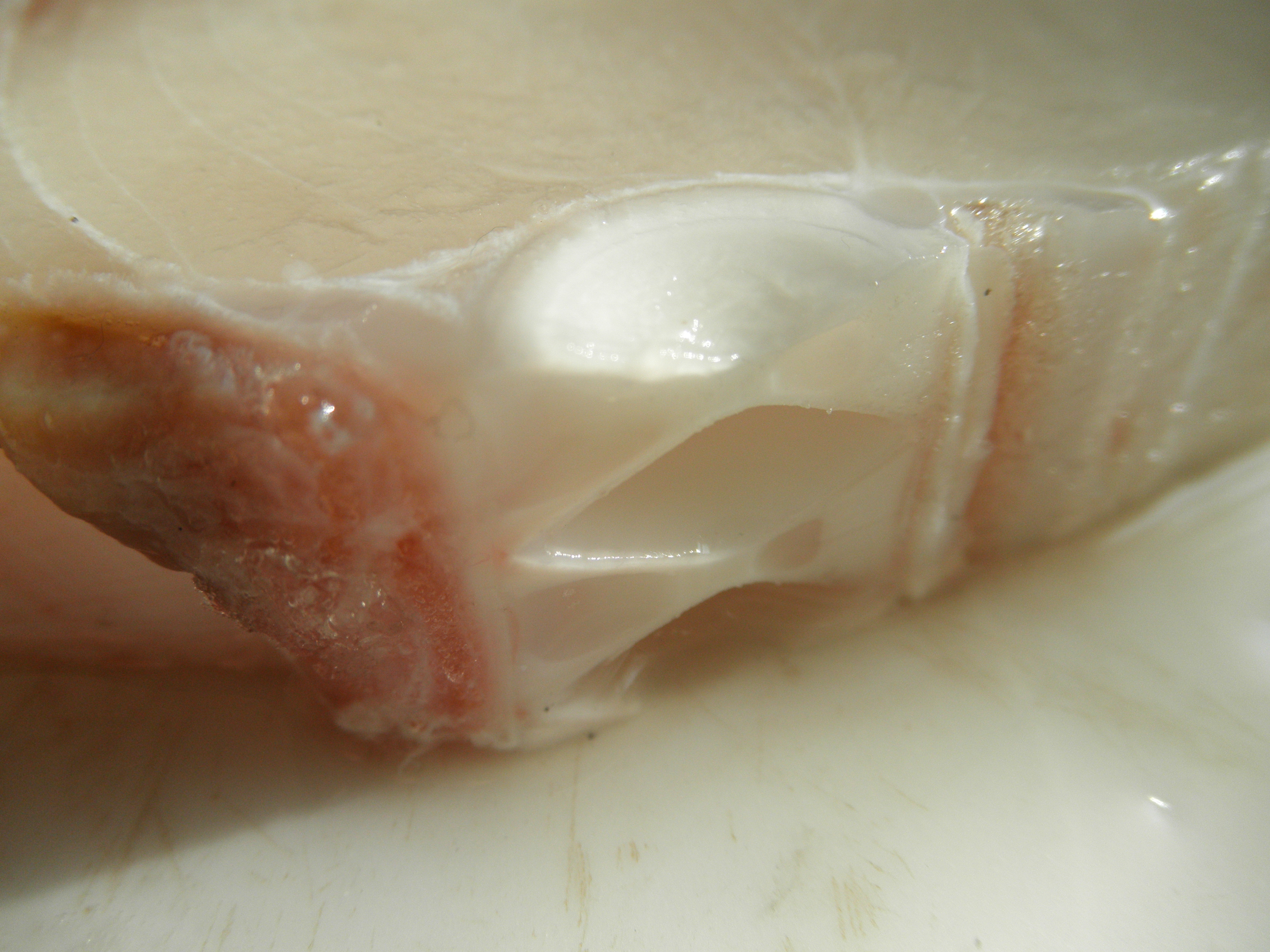
Raw steak of blue shark showing a cross section of shark cartilage.

Shark cartilage is a dietary supplement made from the dried and powdered cartilage of a shark skeleton. Shark cartilage is marketed under numerous brand names, with advertising that it may prevent various illnesses, including cancer.

There is no scientific evidence that shark cartilage is useful in treating or preventing cancer or other diseases. Controlled trials have shown no benefit to shark cartilage supplements. Common side effects of taking shark cartilage supplements include nausea, gastrointestinal upset, and hypercalcemia.

Shark cartilage supplements are marketed using the misconception that sharks do not get cancer, a myth that was as popularized by the 1992 book Sharks Don't Get Cancer. In the United States, the Federal Trade Commission has taken legal action against such fraudulent promoters.

Tumors of different kinds, some metastatic, have been found in a number of species of sharks. The first shark tumor was recorded in 1908. Scientists have since discovered 40 benign and cancerous tumors in 18 of the 1,168 species of sharks. Scarcity of studies on shark physiology has perhaps allowed the myth to be accepted as fact for so many years. Multiple cancers in sharks, including tumors in shark cartilage, were documented by Gary Ostrander and his colleagues from the University of Hawaii in research published in 2004.

The ongoing consumption of shark cartilage supplements has been linked to a significant decline in shark populations and the popularity of these supplements has been described as a triumph of pseudoscience and marketing over scientific evaluation.

== Lack of evidence for effectiveness ==
Manufacturers of shark cartilage supplements provide anecdotal testimonials from those who claim to have experienced relief from arthritis symptoms and pain, as a result of taking shark cartilage supplements.

Opponents cite existing studies of shark cartilage on a variety of cancers that produced negligible to non-existent results in the prevention or treatment of cancer. Most notable among these was a breast-cancer trial conducted by the Mayo Clinic that stated that the trial "was unable to demonstrate any suggestion of efficacy for this shark cartilage product in patients with advanced cancer." The results of another clinical trial were presented at the 43rd annual meeting of the American Society of Clinical Oncology. In that study, sponsored by the National Cancer Institute, "researchers did not find a statistical difference in survival" between patients receiving shark cartilage and those taking a placebo. Scientific evidence does not support the efficacy of shark cartilage nor the ability of effective components to remove cancer cells. The fact that people believe eating shark cartilage can cure cancer shows the serious potential impacts of pseudoscience.

Detractors also claim that previous beliefs in regards to sharks and cancer have been overturned, as forty-two varieties of cancer have now been discovered in sharks and related species. Also, some opponents feel that non-existent (or even limited) results do not justify the rampant over-fishing of some endangered species of sharks, further threatening their extinction.

== Legal action and penalty ==
In the summer of 2004, Lane Labs-USA, Inc., a manufacturer of a shark cartilage supplement and skin cream, was ordered to cease the promotion of its products, as they had not conducted any research to support their claims, much less assessed the products for side effects. The US Federal Trade Commission ordered Lane Labs to "pay restitution to all of its customers from September of 1999 to the present" (2000), and penalized the company with a $1 million judgment.

== See also ==
- List of unproven and disproven cancer treatments
- Shark finning
