= Sharks Don't Get Cancer =

Book by I. William Lane and Linda Comac

Sharks Don't Get Cancer: How Shark Cartilage Could Save Your Life
- Author: I. William Lane, Linda Comac
- Publisher: Avery Publishing
- Publication date: 1992

Sharks Don't Get Cancer (subtitle: How Shark Cartilage Could Save Your Life) is a 1992 book written by I. William Lane and Linda Comac and published by Avery Publishing. Despite its title, the book does not claim that sharks never get cancer, only that they rarely do so, a fact which has been known since the first malignancy was found in a shark specimen in 1908. Lane and Comac further claimed that this was because shark cartilage contained cancer-fighting elements, and so that powdered shark cartilage is an effective treatment for cancer and numerous other conditions. However, there is no scientific evidence that shark cartilage is useful in treating or preventing cancer or any other disease. In 1996, Lane co-authored another book on the same subject, entitled Sharks Still Don't Get Cancer.

== Background ==
Lane became interested in the potential health benefits of shark cartilage after watching a CNN story about a study in Science that found that shark cartilage inhibited blood vessels from growing toward tumors.

== Publicity ==
After Sharks Don’t Get Cancer was published, Lane's claims received further publicity from segments on 60 Minutes in 1993. One of these segments featured Lane and some Cuban physicians and patients who had participated in a clinical trial on the effectiveness of shark cartilage for terminal cancer.

== Reaction from scientists ==
After Lane's writings regarding sharks and cancer became well-known, scientists became concerned about the clinical trials he had been conducting in Cuba and Mexico. It also later became known that the cartilage product Lane was testing in these trials was made by the company Lane Labs, which was run by his son, Andrew Lane. Robert S. Langer, a co-author of the 1983 study showing that shark cartilage inhibited the growth of blood vessels toward tumors, along with Judah Folkman, a professor of surgery at Harvard Medical School, said in an interview that Lane was "inappropriately using our published work and our names to imply that we support his claims." A 2004 paper in Cancer Research said that even if sharks did rarely get cancer, as Lane claims, "cancer incidence is irrelevant to the use of crude extracts for cancer treatment."
