= White Lake, Sullivan County, New York =

White Lake
- Hamlet and CDP
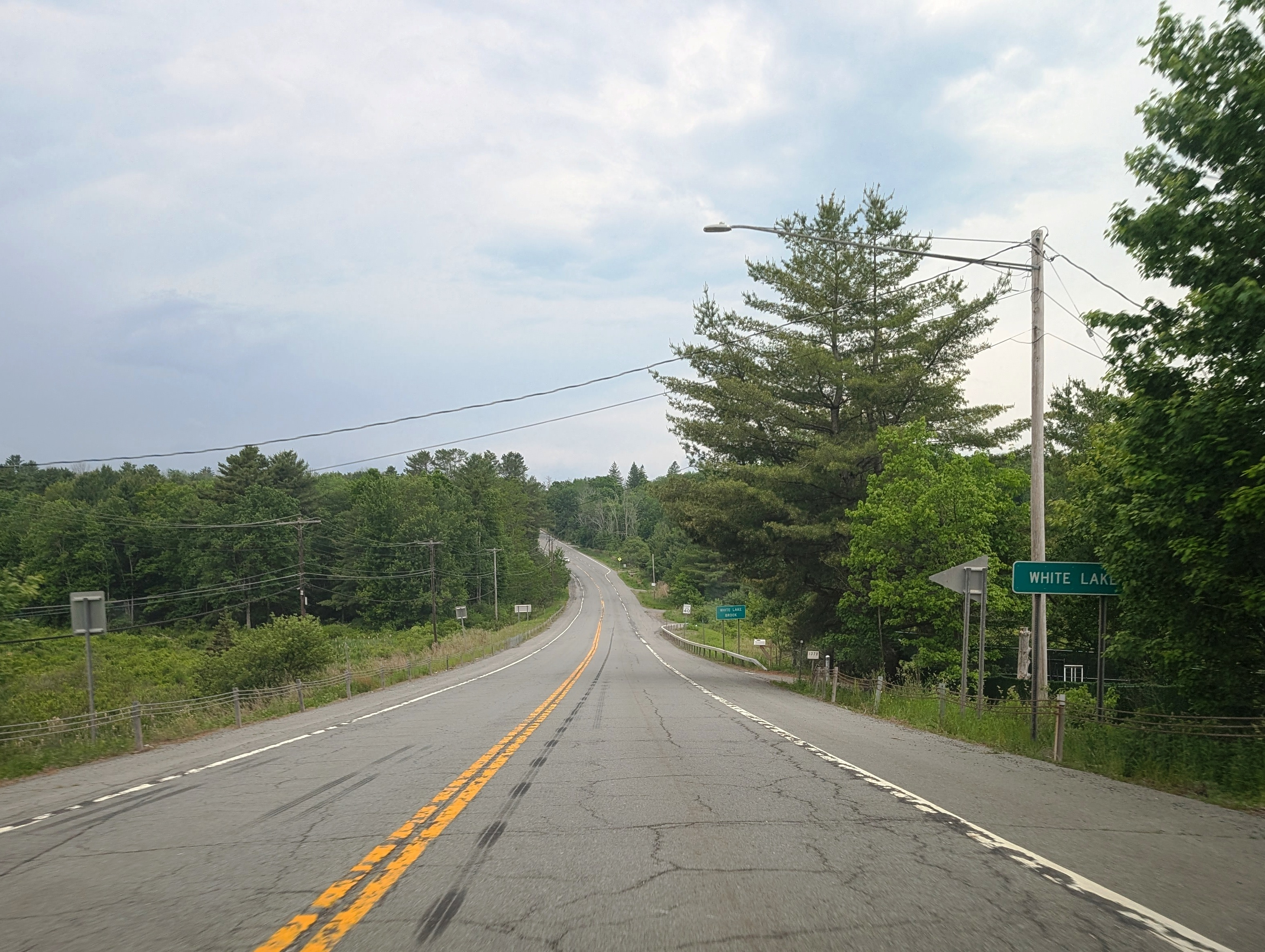
- NY 17B westbound entering White Lake

- Location within the state of New York
- Coordinates: 41°40′28″N 74°49′44″W
- Country: United States
- State: New York
- County: Sullivan
- Time zone: UTC-5 (Eastern (EST))
  - Summer (DST): UTC-4 (EDT)
- ZIP codes: 12786

White Lake is a hamlet (and census-designated place) in the town of Bethel, Sullivan County, New York, United States, on the southeastern shore of a lake of the same name. It was the closest community to the Woodstock Music and Art Fair in 1969.

The community has a post office. Its population in 2000 was reported at 665 and it is the largest community in the town of Bethel. The Bethel Town Hall is also located in the community.

The lake is reported to be the deepest lake (80 feet (24 m)) in Sullivan County. Residents in the 19th century claimed that the biggest brook trout in the world (8 pounds, 14 ounces) was caught in the lake in 1843.

According to local lore, its Native American name was Kauneonga—meaning lake with two wings (the lake has a figure 8 layout resembling wings). The White Lake name is said to have come from the white sand beaches on its shores and white bottom. The northern portion of White Lake, formerly known as North White Lake, is now called Kauneonga Lake.

== History ==
A saw mill and grist mill were established at the outlet of the lake circa 1804. In 1811, a hotel was established in the community, starting a long history of it becoming a resort.

The History of Sullivan County reports, "Physicians frequently send invalids to recover health from its life giving qualities. Instances of recovery almost incredible might be given: so that those who wish to combine rare scenery with healthiness of climate, a sojourn during the summer-months is desirable."

Writer Alfred B. Street extolled its virtues in his poem "White Lake", which includes these lines:

Hark! like an organ's tones, the woods
To the light wind murmurs wake;
The voice of the vast solitudes
Is speaking to the lake

The New York Times in 1903 wrote, "The railroad station for White Lake is either Liberty or Monticello. A picturesque drive over the Shawangunk Mountains brings one to this beautiful lake. The hotels which are on both sides are among the best in Sullivan County. At this place all aquatic sports may be indulged in."

In the late 19th century, large grand hotels, including the White Lake Mansion House, were built on the shores. In the early 20th century, grand hotels gave way to bungalow style motels as it became a popular Borscht Belt destination, with more than 24 hotels and camps catering to Jews. Among these hotels was the Fur Workers' Resort (later White Lake Lodge, then Camp Hi-Li) which was initially aimed at furriers. The furriers gave it up after discovering that summer was the busiest season for them.

In the 1960s with the Borscht Belt declining various people made attempts to revitalize the area including an attempt by the Monticello Raceway to have harness racing on the frozen lake in the winter.

=== Woodstock ===
In 1969, Elliot Tiber, whose parents owned the dilapidated El Monaco Motel on Route 17B, received a permit from the town of Bethel to stage a music festival on the motel grounds. When in July 1969 Wallkill refused to issue a permit for the Woodstock Festival, Tiber suggested they use his permit for the concert at the motel. Since the space was too small, the producers then staged the festival on the farm of Max Yasgur, approximately three miles northwest of White Lake.
