= Sam Yasgur =

American lawyer

- Born: Samuel S. Yasgur; January 9, 1942; Mamaroneck, New York, U.S.
- Died: June 23, 2016 (aged 74); Charles County, Maryland, U.S.
- Education: Cornell University; University of Chicago Law School
- Occupations: Attorney, author
- Known for: Sullivan County Attorney; Son of Woodstock Festival land owner Max Yasgur

Samuel Stephen Yasgur (January 9, 1942 – June 23, 2016) was an American attorney and Sullivan County, New York official. He was the son of Max Yasgur, who leased land on his 600 acres (2.4 km^{2}) dairy farm in Bethel, New York for the Woodstock Music and Art Festival in August 1969. Yasgur said that his "consultations with his father" played a crucial role in the concert coming to Bethel. He grew up on his father's farm, and was a graduate of Cornell University and the University of Chicago Law School.

Yasgur was a 27-year-old assistant district attorney in Manhattan when his father allowed the Woodstock festival to take place on his land. The concert had just been barred from taking place at the Orange County town of Wallkill, New York. The Woodstock Festival took place from August 15 to 18, 1969.

Yasgur went on to become an attorney at Hall Dickler, and also served as Westchester County Attorney and Sullivan County Attorney.

Yasgur wrote a book about his father, Max B. Yasgur: The Woodstock Festival’s Famous Farmer, which was self-published in August 2009.

Yasgur died in 2016 from bone cancer.
