= Max Yasgur =

American farmer (1919–1973)

- Yasgur at Woodstock in 1969, which was held on part of his dairy farm in Bethel, New York
- Born: Max Bernard Yasgur; December 15, 1919; New York City, U.S.
- Died: February 9, 1973 (aged 53); Marathon, Florida, U.S.
- Education: New York University
- Occupation: Farmer
- Years active: 1949−1971
- Known for: Leasing a field of his farm for the purpose of holding the Woodstock festival
- Political party: Republican
- Children: Sam, Lois

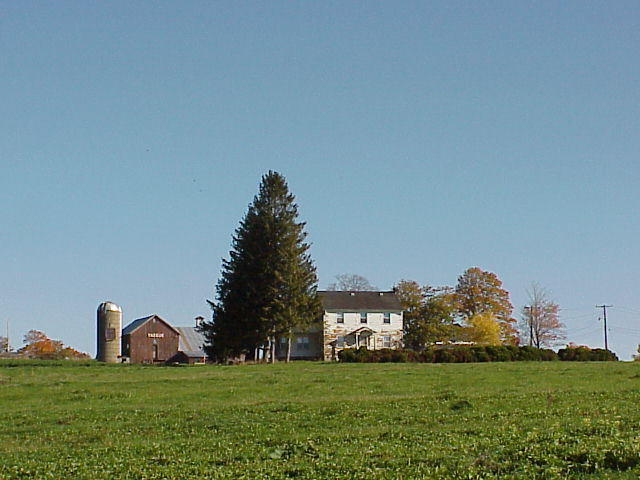
Yasgur's farm at 27 Yasgur Rd in Cochecton, New York, in 1999

Max Bernard Yasgur (December 15, 1919 – February 9, 1973) was an American farmer. He was the owner of the 600-acre (240 ha) dairy farm in Bethel, New York, where the Woodstock Music and Art Fair was held on August 15–18, 1969. He sold his farm in 1971 and retired to Florida, where he died in 1973.

== Personal life and dairy farming ==
Yasgur was born in Manhattan, New York City, to immigrants Samuel and Bella (née Feder) Yasgur. Sam had been born in Minsk, now in Belarus, and Bella had been born in Poland. Max was raised with his brother Isidore (1926–2010) on the family's farm (where his parents also ran a small hotel) and attended New York University, studying real estate law.

By the late 1960s, he was the largest milk producer in Sullivan County, New York. His farm had 650 cows, mostly Guernseys.

At the time of the festival in 1969, Yasgur was married to Miriam (Mimi) Gertrude Miller Yasgur and had a son, Sam (1942–2016) and daughter, Lois (1944–1977). His son was an assistant district attorney in New York City at the time.

Yasgur was a conservative Republican. Nevertheless, he felt that the Woodstock festival could help tame the generation gap. Yasgur showed disapproval towards the treatment of the counterculture movement, . Woodstock promoter Michael Lang considered Yasgur to be his "hero", even though in many ways he was "the antithesis" of what the Woodstock festival stood for. Yasgur spoke openly and often about why he agreed to allow the festival to take place at his farm.

== Woodstock Festival ==
After area villages Saugerties (located about 40 miles (64 km) from Yasgur's farm) and Wallkill declined to provide a venue for the festival, Yasgur leased one of his farm's fields for a fee that festival sponsors later said was $10,000. Soon after agreeing to host the event, he began to receive both threatening and supporting phone calls (which could not be placed without the assistance of an operator because the community of White Lake, New York, where the telephone exchange was located, still used manual switching). While many calls were critical of his decision, the helpful calls outnumbered the threatening ones.

Opposition to the festival began soon after the festival's relocation to Bethel was announced. Signs were erected around town, saying, "Local People Speak Out Stop Max's Hippie Music Festival", "No 150,000 hippies here", and "Buy no milk".

Yasgur was 49 at the time of the festival and had a heart condition. He said at the time that he never expected the festival to be so large, but that "if the generation gap is to be closed, we older people have to do more than we have done."

Yasgur quickly established a rapport with the concert-goers, providing food at cost or for free. When he heard that some local residents were reportedly selling water to people coming to the concert, he put up a big sign at his barn on New York State Route 17B reading "Free Water." The New York Times reported that Yasgur "slammed a work-hardened fist on the table and demanded of some friends, 'How can anyone ask money for water?'" His son Sam recalled his father telling his children to "take every empty milk bottle from the plant, fill them with water and give them to the kids, and give away all the milk and milk products we had at the dairy."

At the time of the concert, friends described Yasgur as an individualist who was motivated as much by his principles as by the money. According to Sam Yasgur, his father agreed to rent the field to the festival organizers because it was a very wet year, which curtailed hay production. The income from the rental would offset the cost of purchasing thousands of bales of hay.

Yasgur also believed strongly in freedom of expression, and was angered by the hostility of some townspeople toward "anti-war hippies". Hosting the festival became, for him, a "cause".

On the third day of the festival, just before Joe Cocker's early afternoon set, Yasgur addressed the crowd:

"I'm a farmer. I don't know how to speak to twenty people at one time, let alone a crowd like this. But I think you people have proven something to the world — not only to the Town of Bethel, or Sullivan County, or New York State; you've proven something to the world. This is the largest group of people ever assembled in one place. We have had no idea that there would be this size group, and because of that you've had quite a few inconveniences as far as water, food, and so forth. Your producers have done a mammoth job to see that you're taken care of... they'd enjoy a vote of thanks. But above that, the important thing that you've proven to the world is that a half a million kids — and I call you kids because I have children that are older than you are — a half million young people can get together and have three days of fun and music and have nothing but fun and music, and I – God bless you for it!"

His speech was met with a massive cheer from the audience.

== After Woodstock ==
Several of the performers at the festival had arranged to send thank-you gifts, flowers, and letters to Yasgur for allowing use of the farm.

Many of Yasgur's neighbors turned against him after the festival, and he no longer felt welcome at the town's general store, but he never regretted his decision to allow the concert on his farm. The local postmaster reportedly turned against the Yasgurs, so they opted to change their address from Bethel to Cochecton, another nearby town. On January 7, 1970, he was sued by his neighbors for property damage caused by the concert attendees. However, the damage to his own property was far more extensive and, over a year later, he received a $50,000 settlement to pay for the near-destruction of his dairy farm. He refused to rent out his farm for a 1970 revival of the festival, saying, "As far as I know, I'm going back to running a dairy farm".

In 1971, after having gotten tired of dealing with his neighbors, Yasgur sold the 600-acre (240 ha) farm to Charles and June Gelish, and moved to Marathon, Florida, where, a year and a half later, he died of a heart attack at the age of 53. He was given a full-page obituary in Rolling Stone magazine, one of the few non-musicians to have received such an honor.

In 1997, the site of the concert and 1,400 acres (570 ha) surrounding it was purchased from Charles and June Gelish by Alan Gerry for the purpose of creating the Bethel Woods Center for the Arts. In August 2007, the 103-acre (42 ha) parcel that contains Yasgur's former homestead, about three miles (5 km) from the festival site, was placed on the market for $8 million by its owner, Roy Howard.

In June 2024, during a record heatwave, a fire totally destroyed an iconic barn on the grounds. A total of 21 fire companies responded. At the time of Yasgur's death in 1973, his net worth was estimated to be around $5 million (approximately $36.3 million in 2025), mostly from the sale of his farm for $1,000 per acre.

== In popular culture ==
- Joni Mitchell's song "Woodstock", made famous by Crosby, Stills, Nash & Young (also covered by Matthews Southern Comfort, Richie Havens, James Taylor, Eva Cassidy, Chelsea Wolfe, and Brooke Fraser), has a line about "going down to Yasgur's Farm".
- Mountain (who were also at the concert) recorded a song shortly after the event entitled "For Yasgur's Farm".
- The Beastie Boys 1989 album Paul's Boutique samples Yasgur's Woodstock speech on the track "Car Thief".
- The progressive rock band Moon Safari has a song titled "Yasgur's Farm" on their album Blomljud.
- Yasgur is portrayed by Eugene Levy in Ang Lee's film Taking Woodstock.
- Yasgur's son Sam wrote a book about him called Max B. Yasgur: The Woodstock Festival's Famous Farmer, in August 2009.

== See also ==
- Michael Eavis, British farmer who has hosted the Glastonbury Festival since 1970
