= Woodstock 50 =

2019 cancelled American music festival

- Original Woodstock 50 promotional poster
- Dates: August 16–18, 2019 (canceled)
- Founders: Michael Lang
- Website: woodstock.com

Woodstock 50 was a cancelled music festival originally scheduled to be held on August 16–18, 2019 at the Watkins Glen International racetrack in New York and later the Merriweather Post Pavilion in Maryland. The event was intended as a commemoration of the 50th anniversary of the Woodstock Music & Art Fair, a landmark festival that was held August 15–18, 1969, in Bethel, New York. The event faced numerous challenges, including permit and production issues, venue relocations, and artist cancellations. The festival was reduced from three days to one day shortly before it was canceled on July 31, 2019.

The planned lineup featured a mix of contemporary and original Woodstock performers, including the Killers, Jay-Z, Miley Cyrus, Santana, Dead & Company, Imagine Dragons, and many others.

In June 2020, the organizers filed a lawsuit against Dentsu Aegis and Amplifi Live, alleging sabotage. Woodstock 50 co-creator Michael Lang died on January 8, 2022.

== Overview ==
Artists initially announced for the Woodstock 50 lineup included the Killers, Imagine Dragons, Halsey, Miley Cyrus, Robert Plant, the Raconteurs, Cage the Elephant and Janelle Monáe. The lineup also included several musical acts that had performed at the original 1969 festival, such as Dead & Company (featuring three members of the Grateful Dead), John Fogerty (with Creedence Clearwater Revival in 1969), Santana, David Crosby (with Crosby, Stills & Nash in 1969), Melanie, John Sebastian, Hot Tuna (featuring two members of Jefferson Airplane), Canned Heat and Country Joe McDonald (lead singer of Country Joe and the Fish in 1969).

Woodstock 50 and its lineup were officially announced in March 2019 but tickets were not released for sale on a previously scheduled date. In late April 2019, a financial backer claimed the festival had been canceled, which was disputed by organizers. Conflicting media reports ranged from allegations of financial and legal difficulties to an inability to secure proper permits from local officials. In May, a judge ruled that the financiers had no right to cancel the festival, allowing the event to proceed as planned. The festival was to take place at the Watkins Glen International racetrack but in June 2019 the venue announced the event would no longer be held there. The concert's location was moved to Merriweather Post Pavilion in Maryland on July 25. The next day, all of the artists who had been initially announced as part of the festival's lineup were released from their contracts.

== Background ==
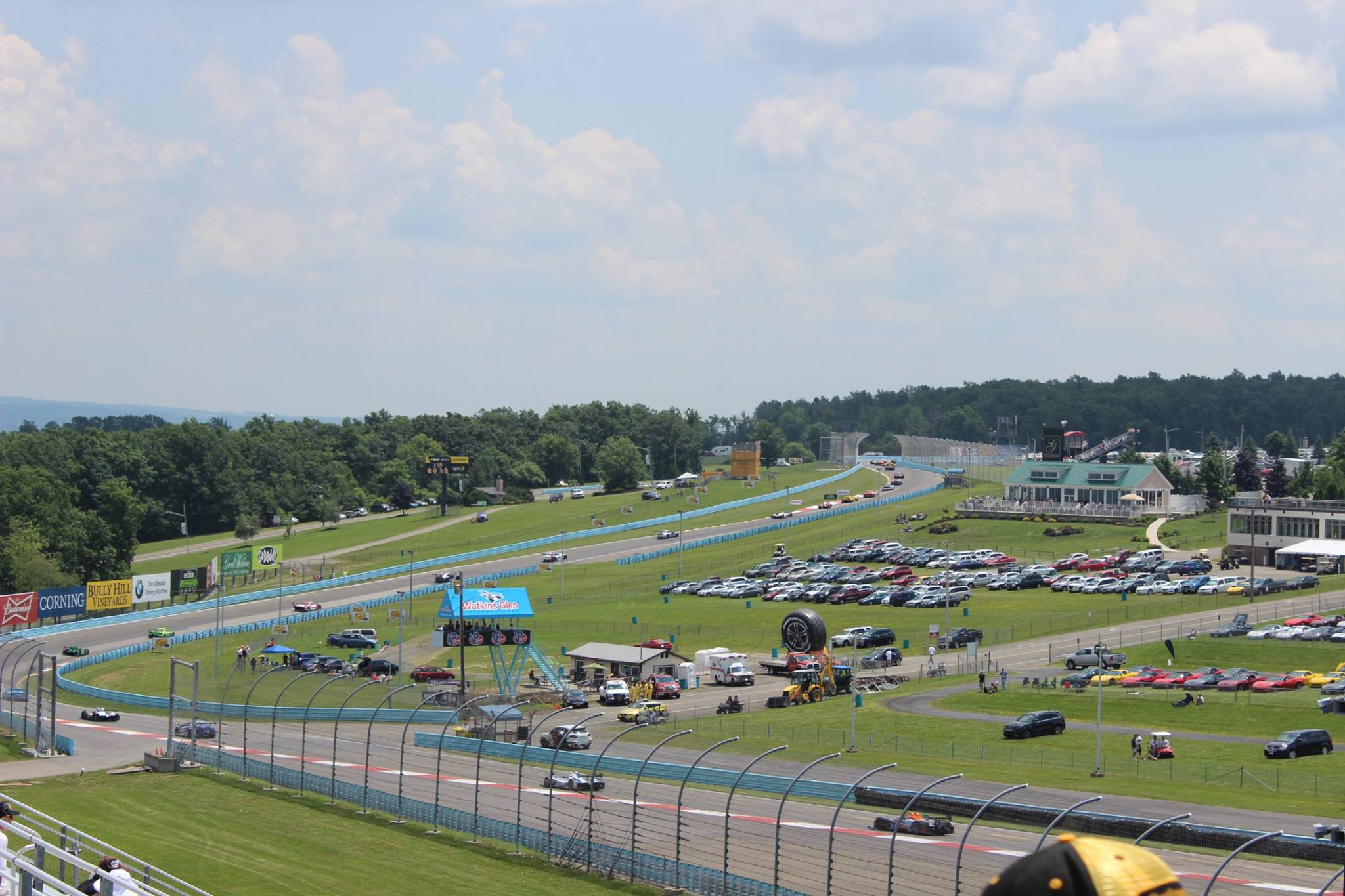
Part of the Watkins Glen International racetrack (pictured in 2014), the original planned venue of the festival.

Woodstock's co-creator Michael Lang helped organize Woodstock 50. Since 2014, Lang had been planning to hold a 50th anniversary Woodstock festival in 2019. He began negotiating with Japanese investment firm Dentsu Aegis Network in late 2018 to arrange funding for Woodstock 50. Lang was hired as a consultant by Woodstock 50 LLC, a production company founded by hoteliers Greg Peck and Susan Cronin, and a separate entity from Lang's company Woodstock Ventures. This arrangement was made so Lang could avoid a conflict of interest with Woodstock Ventures, which owns the rights to the Woodstock brand. Woodstock 50 LLC and Lang entered into a partnership with Dentsu Aegis in December 2018, and licensed the rights to use the Woodstock name from Woodstock Ventures. The investment firm was contracted to contribute about $49.1 million to fund the festival, based on Lang's initial estimated attendance number of 150,000 people.

In January 2019, Lang confirmed that he would be organizing a fourth three-day Woodstock festival that would take place in August in Watkins Glen, New York. The Watkins Glen International racetrack was chosen as the festival location. In August 2018, a festival organized by the rock band Phish that was to be held at the racetrack was canceled by New York Department of Health officials one day before it was scheduled to begin due to water quality and safety issues following several days of flooding in the Finger Lakes region. Lang said he planned for a separate water supply to be brought into the Woodstock 50 site to avoid these issues. Billboard reported that promoters and agents had tried to persuade Lang to seek another venue because the site was too far away from hotels and was seen as a risky location following the circumstances of Phish's cancellation the previous year.

In selecting artists for the festival's lineup, Lang planned to book popular contemporary artists alongside musical acts who had appeared in the lineup of the original 1969 Woodstock festival. In early documents, Lang named several potential headliners for Woodstock 50, including Lady Gaga, Bruno Mars, Beyoncé, My Morning Jacket, Bruce Springsteen, Stevie Wonder, Phish, Kendrick Lamar, Green Day, and Drake, none of whom would appear in the announced lineup. Lang had also sought Paul McCartney, Billy Joel, and a reunited Led Zeppelin as headlining performers, but with the exception of Led Zeppelin singer Robert Plant, none of those artists appeared in Woodstock 50's final lineup. Joan Baez told Rolling Stone she had been approached to perform at the festival but had turned the offer down.

The festival's lineup was announced on March 19, 2019. The Black Keys were announced as part of the lineup but pulled out of the festival on April 5 due to a scheduling conflict. Black Keys drummer Patrick Carney later explained that the band decided to cancel because they had just returned from a hiatus, and "We realized that we didn’t want our first show back to be in front of 150,000 people in a field without any control." Following the lineup announcement press conference, Dentsu Aegis privately expressed concern that organizers had spent too much money on acquiring artists other than those that had been previously considered.

A second Woodstock 50th anniversary event, held at the Bethel Woods Center for the Arts—the site of the original 1969 festival—was also scheduled for August 2019. The lineup for the three-day concert program included John Fogerty and Santana, both of whom were included in the Woodstock 50 lineup, as well as Ringo Starr, Arlo Guthrie, Edgar Winter, the Doobie Brothers, Blood, Sweat & Tears, Tedeschi Trucks Band, and Grace Potter. Lang was not involved with the Bethel concert and filed a cease-and-desist notice against its organizer Live Nation for promoting it as a rival event to his Woodstock 50 festival. The Bethel concerts were held as planned on August 16–18.

== Production issues ==
=== Ticketing and permit delays ===
Tickets for the Woodstock 50 festival were supposed to go on sale on April 22, 2019, but no tickets were made available on that date. At that date, the organizers had yet to receive a mass gathering permit from the New York State Department of Health. A New York state health regulation forbids advertising for large, overnights events that do not have a permit, which delayed the sale of tickets. A mass gathering permit for the festival had been submitted on April 15 but the Department of Health had not approved it at that time.

=== First cancellation and change of investors ===
On April 29, investors Dentsu Aegis Network announced it was no longer funding the festival and that the event had been canceled. Officials from Schuyler County, New York also confirmed the cancellation. Dentsu Aegis ceased its involvement after the organizers reduced the capacity of the festival grounds from 100,000 people to 75,000 to accommodate campers. Later that day, the festival organizers disputed the cancellation in a statement to the Poughkeepsie Journal and announced they would be seeking a "legal remedy." Lang also stated on his Facebook page that, despite the loss of their financial backer, the Woodstock 50 organizers would continue to plan the festival and seek new investors, and the festival would go ahead as planned. (Note: Michael Lang: "We are committed to ensuring that the 50th anniversary of Woodstock is marked with a festival deserving of its iconic name and place in American history and culture. Although our financial partner is withdrawing, we will of course be continuing with the planning of the festival and intend to bring on new partners. We would like to acknowledge the State of New York and Schuyler County for all of their hard work and support. The bottom line is, there is going to be a Woodstock 50th Anniversary Festival, as there must be, and it’s going to be a blast!")

Superfly, a production partner of the Woodstock organizers, pulled out of the festival on May 1, also citing changes to the festival's capacity as a reason for its withdrawal. Before their departure, Superfly had estimated 65,000 people as the safest maximum capacity at Watkins Glen, which was a lower estimate than either Dentsu Aegis or Lang had previously considered. Once they received further information of the terrain on the race-track property, they revised their maximum capacity estimate down to 61,000, and stated they would not continue to work on the festival if the festival planned to exceed that number.

As result of Dentsu Aegis's withdrawal, none of the scheduled artists were obliged to play at the event because they had contracts through either Dentsu or Amplifi Live rather than the Woodstock promoters. Representatives from two major talent agencies told Billboard Dentsu Aegis' decision may have voided the artists' contracts and it was unlikely their clients would be performing at the festival. Following the company's announcement, Dead & Company removed Woodstock 50 from the tour itinerary on their website. John Fogerty told Rolling Stone he was disappointed by the announcement and surprised the festival had not secured permits sooner, saying. "You got the sense there was some shakiness to this whole thing".

Billboard reported on May 6 that CID Entertainment would be producing the festival and that for the event to proceed, Lang would need about $30 million by May 10 and a mass gathering permit from the New York Department of Health. Lang also accused Dentsu Aegis of illegally removing $17 million from the festival's bank account, blocking the April 22 ticket sale and attempting to cancel the event without his consent. Lawyers for the Woodstock organizers requested an injunction against Dentsu Aegis in a New York court on May 9, seeking the return of the disputed $17 million. Amplifi Live filed a counter-claim against Lang on May 13, arguing they had the right to take over the festival and cancel it due to Lang's contractual breaches and logistical misrepresentation.

A judge in New York Supreme Court ruled in favor of the Woodstock organizers on May 15 and found that Dentsu Aegis had no legal right to cancel the festival, allowing the event to proceed. The judge also ruled that the organizers were not entitled to the $17.8 million that had been removed from the festival's bank account. On May 17, Oppenheimer Holdings was announced as the festival's new financial backer. Following the court ruling, Lang announced that three-day passes to the festival would cost around $400 and that a limited quantity of limited single-day passes would be available, a change from earlier plans in which only three-day passes would be sold.

=== Loss of original venue ===
Watkins Glen International announced on June 10 it had canceled the contract for the Woodstock 50 festival and that the event would no longer be held at the racetrack. The festival had lost its booking at the racetrack because organizers had missed a $150,000 payment. The same day, CID Entertainment announced it would also be pulling out of the festival. A representative for the festival subsequently told Associated Press the organizers were in talks with another venue to host the event.

In late June, the Woodstock organizers applied for a permit to hold a smaller festival at Vernon Downs horse racing track in Vernon, New York. The organizers were refused the permit on July 9. The organizers' third appeal was denied by the Vernon planning board on July 16.

=== Relocation to Maryland and loss of artist lineup ===
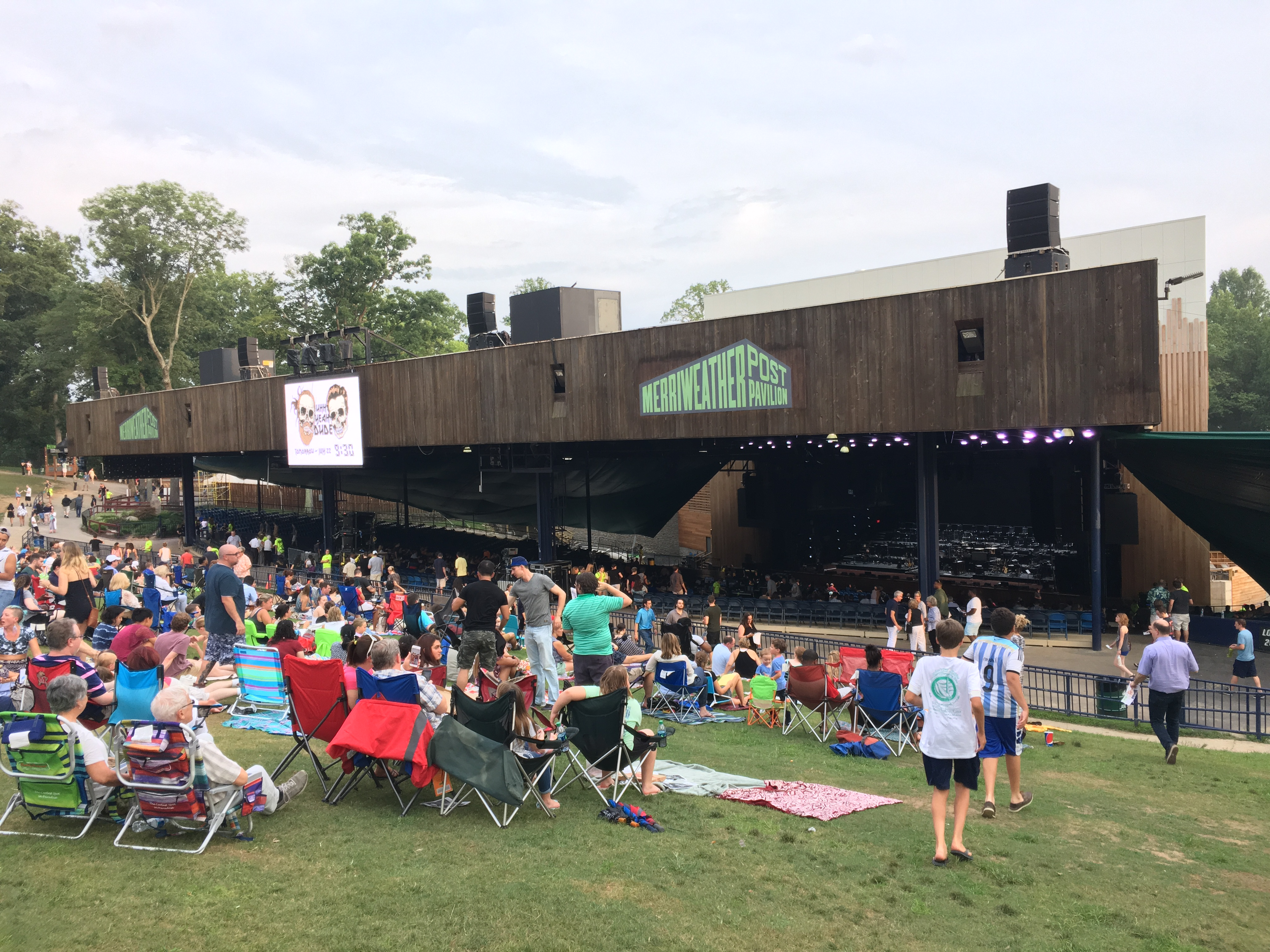
The festival was to be held at the Merriweather Post Pavilion (pictured in 2017) in Columbia, Maryland.

Bloomberg News reported on July 25 that the Woodstock organizers had moved the festival to Merriweather Post Pavilion, a venue with a smaller capacity than either of the planned New York sites, in Columbia, Maryland. Known as "Woodstock 50 Washington", the festival would act as a fundraiser for non-profit organizations involved with voter registration and climate change. Instead of being a ticketed event as originally planned, the festival would be free and concertgoers would be encouraged to donate to charitable causes. Seth Hurwitz, co-founder of Merriweather Post Pavilion operator IMP, said his venue would host the festival if organizers presented them with a lineup. A concert headlined by the Smashing Pumpkins was scheduled to take place at the venue on August 17. Woodstock 50 would have been reduced from three days to one.

Jay-Z and John Fogerty withdrew from the Woodstock 50 lineup shortly after the move to Maryland was announced. On July 26, the promoters released all of the remaining artists on the lineup from their contracted appearances at the relocated festival. The organizers informed artists of the relocation and contract release in a letter that also requested they still perform at the festival and reminded them of the payment they had received from Dentsu Aegis. In the following days, Dead & Company, Country Joe McDonald, John Sebastian, Santana, the Lumineers, the Raconteurs, Pussy Riot, and Miley Cyrus announced they would not be appearing at the relocated festival. Several artists withdrew because they had already scheduled other concerts in the Mid-Atlantic region around the festival weekend and the relocation to Merriweather Post Pavilion conflicted with the radius clauses for some of those events. A representative for the Zombies told Variety that the band still planned to perform at Woodstock 50. On July 30, 17 days before the festival's planned start date, Woodstock 50 organizers had not submitted a permit application to hold an event at Merriweather Post Pavilion.

=== Final cancellation ===
On July 31, the organizers of Woodstock 50 announced the cancellation of the event. In a press release, representatives said, "unforeseen setbacks made it impossible to put on a festival we imagined with the great line-up we had booked and the social engagement we were anticipating". Lang told media he blamed Dentsu Aegis for the festival's failure and that he was considering further legal action against the firm. Despite the cancellation, Lang said he hoped to hold a smaller fundraising event at Merriweather Post Pavilion in late 2019 but was not sure it would bear the Woodstock name.

In June 2020, the organizers of Woodstock 50 filed a lawsuit with the New York Supreme Court against Dentsu Aegis and Amplifi Live. In the suit, the organizers accused the two firms of sabotaging the event by announcing its cancelation in April 2019. Lang died on January 8, 2022.

== Planned line-up ==
Each artist on the Woodstock 50 lineup was paid an advance and the remainder of the payment was held in escrow until performance or the cancellation of the festival. Alongside the official announcement that the event would not proceed, the organizers suggested the artists donate at least 10 percent of their earnings to HeadCount, a non-profit organization that promotes voter registration. Lang was criticized for trying to make the artists feel guilty. Prior to July 26, 2019, when remaining artists withdrew en masse from the event and organizers released them from their contracts, the lineup for the festival was to have included:

August 16

- The Killers
- Miley Cyrus (Note: Cyrus canceled her appearance on July 30.)
- Santana (Note: Santana canceled their appearance on July 30.)
- The Lumineers (Note: The Lumineers canceled their appearance on July 30.)
- The Raconteurs (Note: The Raconteurs canceled their appearance on July 30.)
- Robert Plant and the Sensational Space Shifters
- Nathaniel Rateliff and the Night Sweats
- John Fogerty (Note: Fogerty canceled his appearance on July 25.)
- Run the Jewels
- The Head and the Heart
- Maggie Rogers
- Michael Franti & Spearhead
- Bishop Briggs
- Anderson East
- Akon
- Princess Nokia
- John Sebastian (Note: Sebastian canceled his appearance on July 29.)
- Melanie
- Grandson
- Fever 333
- Dorothy
- Flora Cash
- Larkin Poe
- Brian Cadd
- Ninet Tayeb

August 17

- Dead & Company (Note: Dead & Company canceled their appearance on July 27.)
- Chance the Rapper (Note: Chance the Rapper never formally canceled his appearance, but Woodstock 50 did not appear on his 2019 tour itinerary when dates were released on July 29.)
- The Black Keys (Note: The Black Keys canceled their appearance on April 5 due to a "scheduling conflict".)
- Sturgill Simpson
- Greta Van Fleet
- Portugal. The Man
- Leon Bridges
- Gary Clark Jr.
- Edward Sharpe and the Magnetic Zeros
- David Crosby and Friends (Note: Crosby told Rolling Stone that he had canceled his appearance after the move to Vernon Downs was nixed, but did not make his cancelation public.)
- Dawes
- Margo Price
- Nahko and Medicine for the People
- India.Arie
- Jade Bird
- Country Joe McDonald (Note: McDonald canceled his appearance on July 29.)
- Rival Sons
- Emily King
- Soccer Mommy
- Sir
- Taylor Bennett
- Amy Helm
- Courtney Hadwin
- Pearl
- John-Robert
- IAMDDB

August 18

- Jay-Z (Note: Jay-Z officially canceled his appearance on July 26. Lang later stated that Jay-Z had privately canceled his performance after the festival lost its original Watkins Glen location.)
- Imagine Dragons
- Halsey
- Cage the Elephant
- Brandi Carlile
- Janelle Monáe
- Young the Giant
- Courtney Barnett
- Common
- Vince Staples
- Judah & the Lion
- Earl Sweatshirt
- Boygenius
- Reignwolf
- The Zombies
- Canned Heat
- Hot Tuna
- Pussy Riot (Note: Pussy Riot canceled their appearance on July 30.)
- Cherry Glazerr
- Leven Kali
- The Marcus King Band
- Victory
- Hollis Brown
- John Craigie
- Amigo the Devil
- Liz Brasher
