= A Man Called Destruction (book) =

2014 biography of Alex Chilton

A Man Called Destruction: The Life and Music of Alex Chilton, from Box Tops to Big Star to Backdoor Man
- First edition cover
- Author: Holly George-Warren
- Cover artist: David Godlis (photographer)
- Language: English
- Genre: Biography
- Publisher: Penguin Books
- Publication date: 2014
- Publication place: United States
- Media type: Print (Hardcover)
- Pages: 384 pp (1st ed., hardcover)
- ISBN: 978-0-698-15142-0 1st ed., hardcover

A Man Called Destruction: The Life and Music of Alex Chilton, from Box Tops to Big Star to Backdoor Man is a 2014 biography of musician Alex Chilton, written by Holly George-Warren.

== Summary ==
Alex Chilton's musical career began in October 1966, when the 15-year-old joined a band that would later be named The Box Tops. As their lead vocalist, he recorded "The Letter", one of the biggest hits of 1967.

In 1971, Chilton formed the influential power pop group Big Star, a critically acclaimed but commercially unsuccessful band known for its harmonies and jangling guitars. Chilton's subsequent solo career on small labels drew an intense following among indie and alternative rock musicians.

According to The New York Times, George-Warren's biography addresses questions about Chilton's "wildly different incarnations as a cult figure" whose life and career confounded even the people closest to him, resulting in "a fascinating story, but also an exceptionally knotty one".

== Author ==
Holly George-Warren is the author of over a dozen books, including New York Times bestsellers The Road to Woodstock (with Michael Lang), Public Cowboy #1: The Life and Times of Gene Autry, and Punk 365. She has written for Rolling Stone, The New York Times, The Village Voice, and Entertainment Weekly, and was the editorial director of Rolling Stone Press for eight years. She is a two-time Grammy Award nominee.

== Critical reception ==
The New York Times wrote, "Ms. George-Warren's account is overly intense in its cut-by-cut chronology of his recording career. Yet the man comes through the minutiae, and he's a man whose story needed to be told."

According to Los Angeles Times critic Randall Roberts, "Warren's deep research examines the arc of Chilton's life, uncovers periods of intense focus in famed Memphis studios, including disturbing scenes of a lover's blood on the mixing board and others of Chilton's own blood in bathtubs during suicide attempts." Roberts stated, "It's a credit to Warren's unflinching tone that the Chilton of Destruction is a charismatic, oft-frustrating man unwilling to kowtow to anything or anyone... You'll never hear his music the same way again."
