= Swan Lake, New York =

- Hamlet and CDP
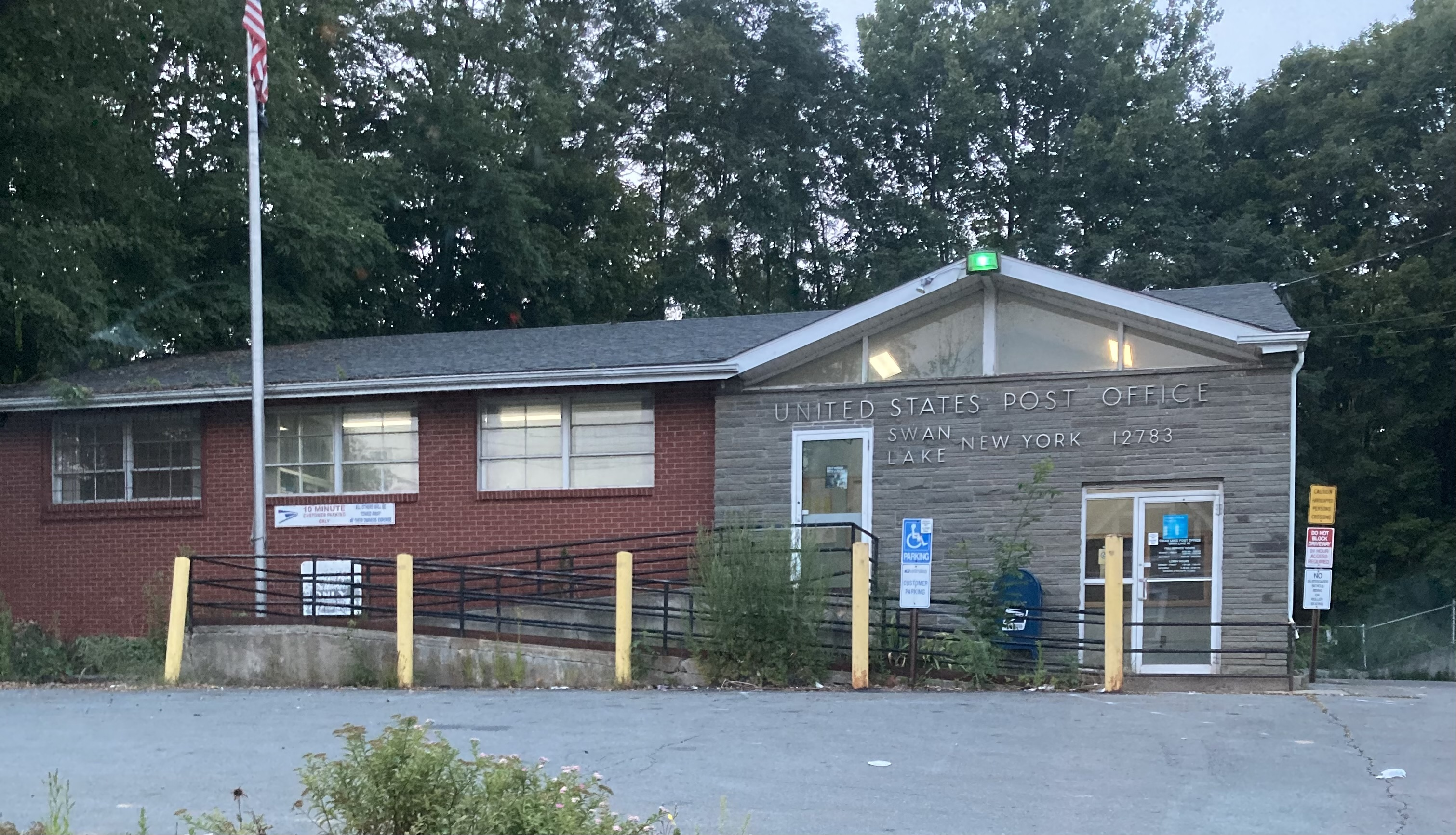
- Swan Lake Post Office

- Location within New York Location within the United States
- Coordinates: 41°45′02″N 74°46′41″W
- Country: United States
- State: New York
- County: Sullivan
- Elevation: 1,345 ft (410 m)
- Time zone: UTC-5 (Eastern (EST))
  - Summer (DST): UTC-4 (EDT)
- ZIP code: 12783
- Area code: 845
- GNIS feature ID: 966887

Swan Lake (formerly Stevensville) is a hamlet and census designated place in the town of Liberty, Sullivan County, New York, United States. As of the 2020 census, Swan Lake had a population of 372. The lake inside the town is also named Swan Lake.

A hotel and tourist industry was founded in Swan Lake in the 1880s.

== History ==
Swan Lake was originally called Stevensville, named after the Stevens brothers who built a large sole leather tannery there. The tannery was in existence until about 1873.

Since the 1880s the Swan Lake area has been noted for its hotel and tourist industry. Many of the local farm girls found jobs there in the early 1900s.

Alden S. Swan arrived there from New York about 1895 and by the time of his death in 1917 owned much of the land and all of the lake. The name was changed to Swan Lake in January 1927.

The Swan estate was purchased by Siegel and Kretchmer and the Siegels went on to build the Commodore and Stevensville the latter developing into a large sprawling hotel run by the Dinnerstein family.

== Geography ==
The community is located along New York State Route 55, 3.9 miles (6.3 km) south-southwest of Liberty, located at the eastern end of a lake called "Swan Lake".

== Historic Buildings ==
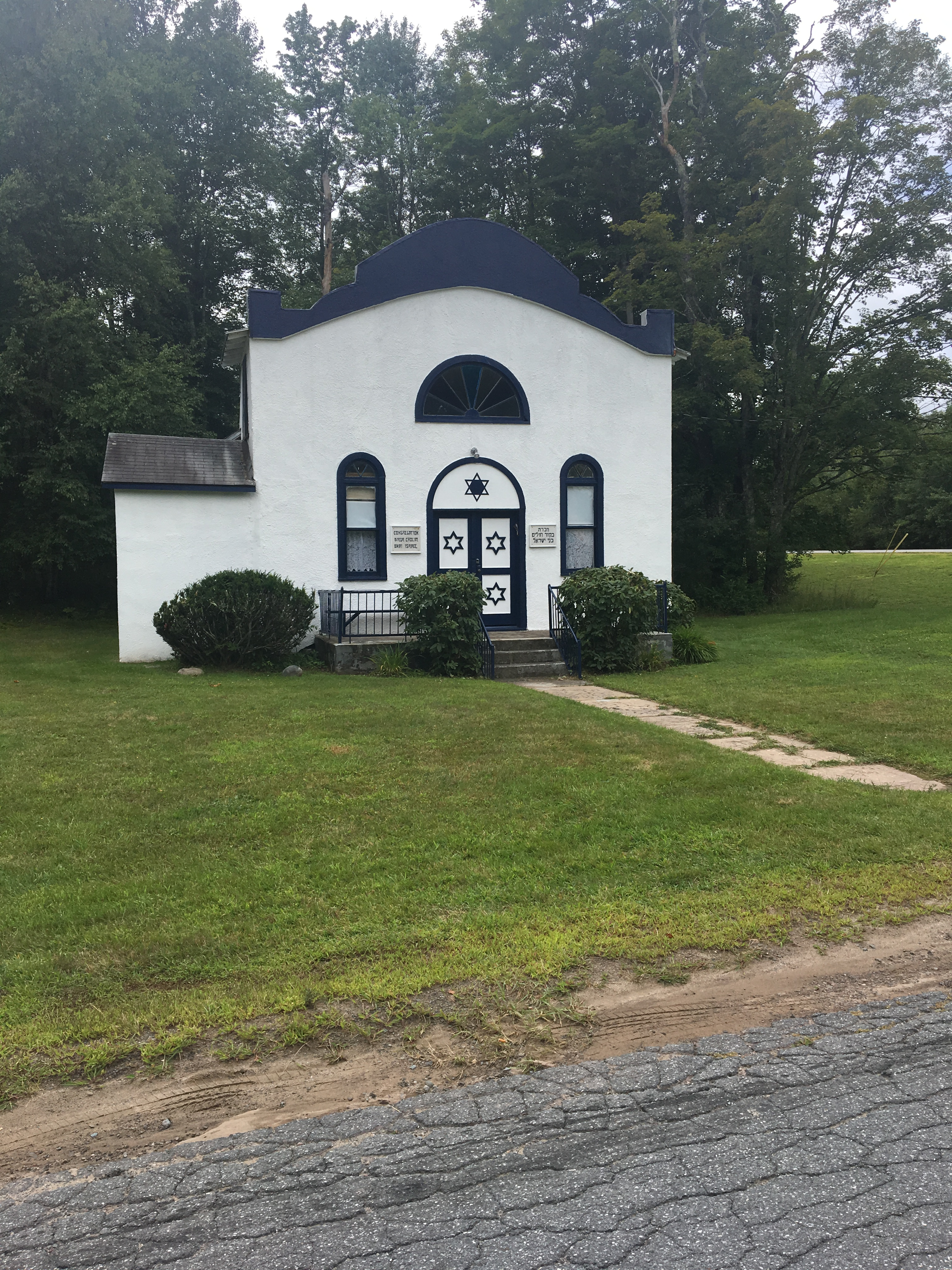
Bikur Cholim B'nai Israel Synagogue

The Bikur Cholim B'nai Israel Synagogue in Swan Lake is listed on the National Register of Historic Places.

== Parks and recreation ==
The town of Bethel Pool and Park is located in Swan Lake.

The lake also known as Swan Lake inside the town is known for its fishing. It has been known to have ice fishing tournaments during the winter months. The lake in Swan Lake known as Swan Lake is known to have chain pickerel, bluegill, crappie, smallmouth bass, largemouth bass and bullhead catfish. The ecology of the lake is of note as the Catskills area is known for its long cultural ties to fishing. The lake is 326 acres in size.

Swan Lake Park is openfrom May 1st to September 30th each year. It has basketball and tennis courts and is along the shore of the lake in Swan Lake. The park has one of the doves from the Sullivan County dove trail that commemorated the 50th anniversary of the Woodstock Music Festival. The Borscht Belt Marker Project erected a sign in the park to commemorate the towns history regarding the Borscht Belt.

The Moshini Stone Castle is a small park garden within the town near the lake.

To celebrate the 50th anniversary of the Woodstock Music Festival, Sullivan County made a dove trail that features painted doves by local artists throughout the county. Swan Lake presently has two of the doves. The first dove is located in Swan Lake Park and was originally at a local restaurant that closed down, and the other is located at the Domes at Catskills on Kelly Bridge Road in Swan Lake.

== Infrastructure ==
Swan Lake post office opened in 1849.

The Swan Lake Fire Department is a volunteer fire department with around 30 members.

== See also ==
- New York State Route 55
- New York State Route 17B
