= Rosenman =

Rosenman is a surname. Notable people with the surname include:

- Howard Rosenman (born 1945), American film producer
- Joel Rosenman (born 1942), founder of Woodstock
- Leonard Rosenman (1924–2008), American film, television and concert composer
- Samuel Irving Rosenman (1896–1973), American lawyer, judge, activist and speechwriter

== See also ==
- Rosenman & Colin, a defunct American law firm
- Katten Muchin Rosenman, an American law firm
