= Lake Superior State Park =

State park in Sullivan County, New York

- Location within New York
- Type: State park
- Location: 342 Dr Duggan Road; Bethel, New York
- Nearest city: Smallwood, New York
- Coordinates: 41°40′19″N 74°52′48″W
- Area: 1,410 acres (5.7 km^{2})
- Operator: Sullivan County; Palisades Interstate Park Commission; New York State Office of Parks, Recreation and Historic Preservation
- Visitors: 11,135 (in 2014)
- Open: All year
- Website: Lake Superior State Park

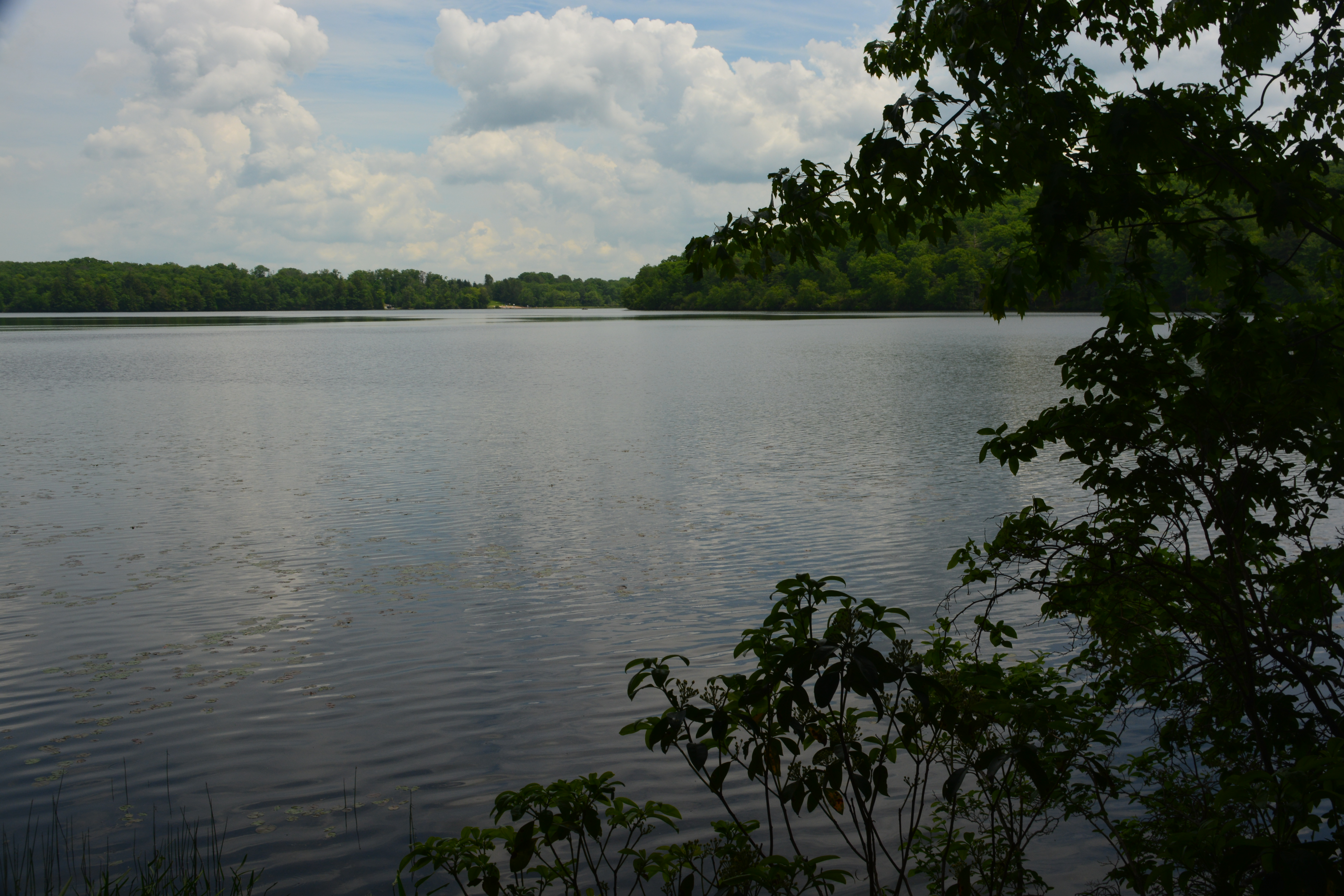
Lake Superior in Bethel, New York

Lake Superior State Park is a 1,410-acre (5.7 km^{2}) state park located on Lake Superior, in the town of Bethel in Sullivan County, New York. The park is operated by the Sullivan County Department of Public Works under a long-term license from the Palisades Interstate Park Commission.

== Park description ==
Lake Superior State Park offers picnic tables, volleyball courts, and a food concession. A swimming beach is open on weekends and holidays from Memorial Day until late June, with daily swimming available from the last week of June through Labor Day. A boat launch is available for boats, but gas-powered motors are not permitted.

Big game hunting, fishing, and ice fishing is permitted within season for individuals possessing valid hunting and fishing licenses.

== See also ==
- List of New York state parks
