= Mediasound Studios =

Former American independent recording studio

Mediasound
- Company type: Recording studio
- Industry: Music
- Founded: June 1, 1969; 57 years ago in New York City, United States
- Founders: Harry Hirsch, Bob Walters
- Headquarters: 311 West 57th Street, New York City, U.S.

Mediasound was an American independent recording studio facility located at 311 West 57th Street in New York City established in 1969 by Harry Hirsch and Bob Walters with financial backing from Joel Rosenman and John P. Roberts.

== History ==
The studio was founded by former JAC Recording engineer Harry Hirsch and Bob Walters, with financial backing from Joel Rosenman and John Roberts. The search for a suitable location for the studio began in 1968 and resulted in the acquisition of the former Manhattan Baptist Church building.

Originally conceived as an 8-track studio, the concept was expanded to a 24-track state-of-the-art facility, increasing the budget from $100,000 to $700,000, and the studio opened in June 1969 with the former church's large wooden front door and 2,000 square foot main room with high ceilings and stained glass windows.

Sessions at Mediasound ranged from commercial jingles and movie soundtrack work to album projects, with the studio hosting a wide variety of artists in the 1970s, including Barry Manilow, Kool & the Gang, Stevie Wonder, Frankie Valli, Lou Reed, Gloria Gaynor, Engelbert Humperdinck, Ramones, and Blondie. Additionally, most of the music for Sesame Street was recorded at Mediasound, as a standing session was booked at 9 am with engineer Fred Christie for years.

Session musicians who worked at Mediasound included Paul Shaffer, Bob Babbitt, Allan Schwartzberg, Will Lee, and Marcus Miller. Numerous recording engineers worked at Mediasound, including Bob Clearmountain, Tony Bongiovi, Godfrey Diamond, Ramona Jan, Michael Barbiero, Michael Delugg, Harvey Goldberg, Ron Saint Germain, Liz Saron Milner, Michael Brauer, Don Wershba, Ed Stasium, Robert Margouleff and Malcolm Cecil, among others.

Harry Hirsch left Mediasound in 1973, and would go on to later found Sound Mixers, GRP Records' corporate studio, and Sound Tracks. In 1977, Bob Walters left to co-found Power Station with Tony Bongiovi. Joel Rosenman continued to oversee daily operations, with John Roberts overseeing finances for the studio.

In 1983, the studio was bought by Michael Hektoen, who managed it until it closed in the 1990s.
