= Bethel Woods Center for the Arts =

Performing arts center and museum

Coordinates: 41°41′50″N 74°52′40″W

- Bethel Woods
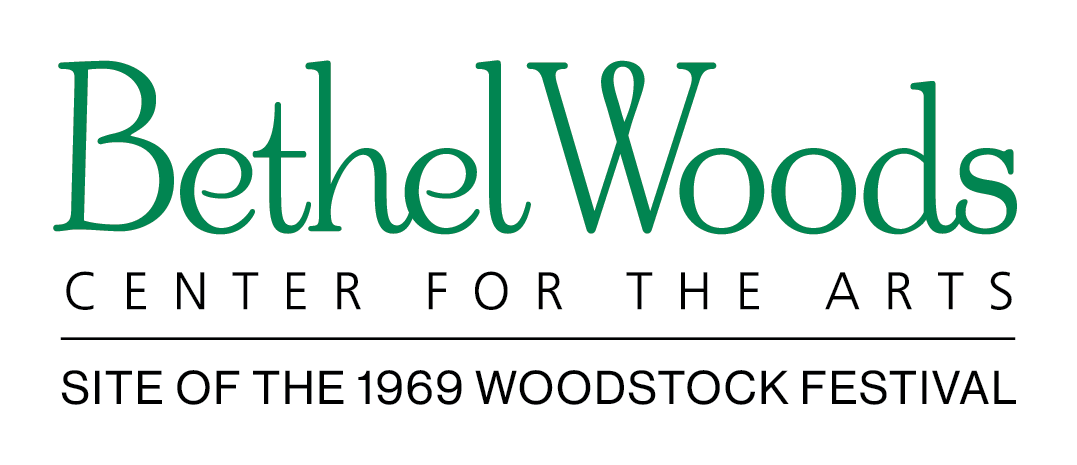

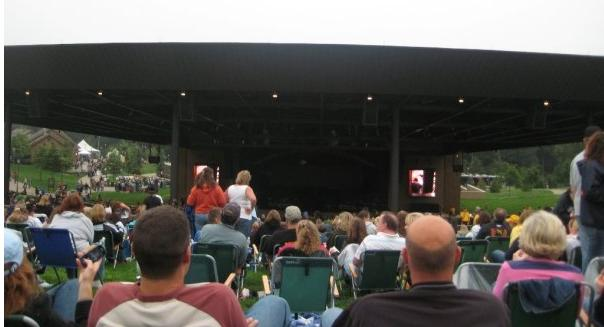
- View of the pavilion from the lawn prior to a concert
- Interactive map of Bethel Woods Center for the Arts
- Address: 200 Hurd Road
- Location: Bethel, New York
- Seating type: Reserved, lawn
- Capacity: 15,000
- Type: Outdoor amphitheatre

Construction
- Groundbreaking: 2004
- Opened: July 4, 2006
- Cost: $150 million

Website
- www.bethelwoodscenter.org

The Bethel Woods Center for the Arts is an amphitheatre, performing arts center and museum located at the site of the 1969 Woodstock Music & Art Fair in Bethel, New York. Located approximately 90 miles (140 km) from New York City, the 800-acre (3.2 km^{2}) site includes a 15,000-seat outdoor concert venue, a 1,000-seat outdoor terrace stage, an intimate 440-seat indoor hall, and the Museum at Bethel Woods. Concerts run June through September and feature many types of music genres.

== History ==
In 1996, Alan Gerry, a longtime Liberty, New York, resident and founder of Cablevision Industries, created a not-for-profit organization named the Gerry Foundation with the intent of revitalizing the economy of Sullivan County, which had faced severe hardships following the collapse of the Borscht Belt tourism industry of the Catskills. That same year, the Foundation purchased the original 37-acre (0.15 km^{2}) Woodstock festival field and hundreds of acres surrounding it, with eventual plans for an arts center.

In 1998, the Foundation hosted a three-day festival on the site named "Day in the Garden", and in 1999 hosted a four-day celebration of the 30th anniversary of the original Woodstock.

Planning for the arts center, designed by architectural firm DLR Group, began in 2002, and construction on the $150 million project started two years later. The amphitheatre opened on July 4, 2006, with a performance by the New York Philharmonic. On August 13, 2006, Crosby, Stills, Nash & Young performed before 16,000 fans at the new center, 37 years after their historic performance at Woodstock. For their encore, they performed the song "Woodstock".

The on-site museum, exploring the 1969 Woodstock festival and the culture of the 1960s, opened in June 2008.

In 2012, Bethel Woods was spun off from the Gerry Foundation into its own 501(c)(3) public nonprofit. The next year, the site opened a conservatory dedicated to expanding youth and teen education programs.

== Venues ==
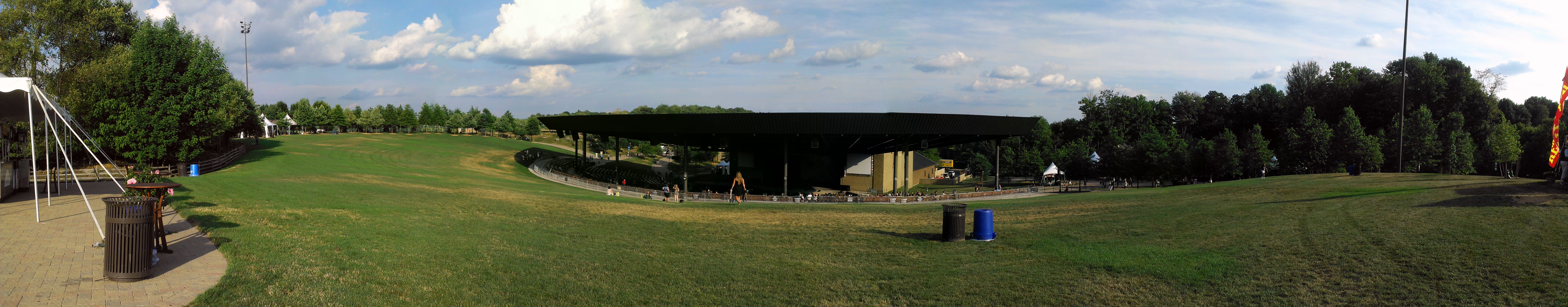
Lawn area prior to a show

Bethel Woods features a 7,500-square-foot (700 m^{2}) main stage called The Pavilion, with 4,500 covered seats and a natural sloping lawn that can accommodate up to 10,500 people. The outdoor Terrace Stage, near the museum, has space for up to 1,000 people, and the Woodstock Festival Field can accommodate up to 30,000 people. Other venues at the center include 440-seat indoor Event Gallery, the 132-seat Museum Theatre, The Market Sheds event space, and two classrooms.

== The Museum at Bethel Woods ==
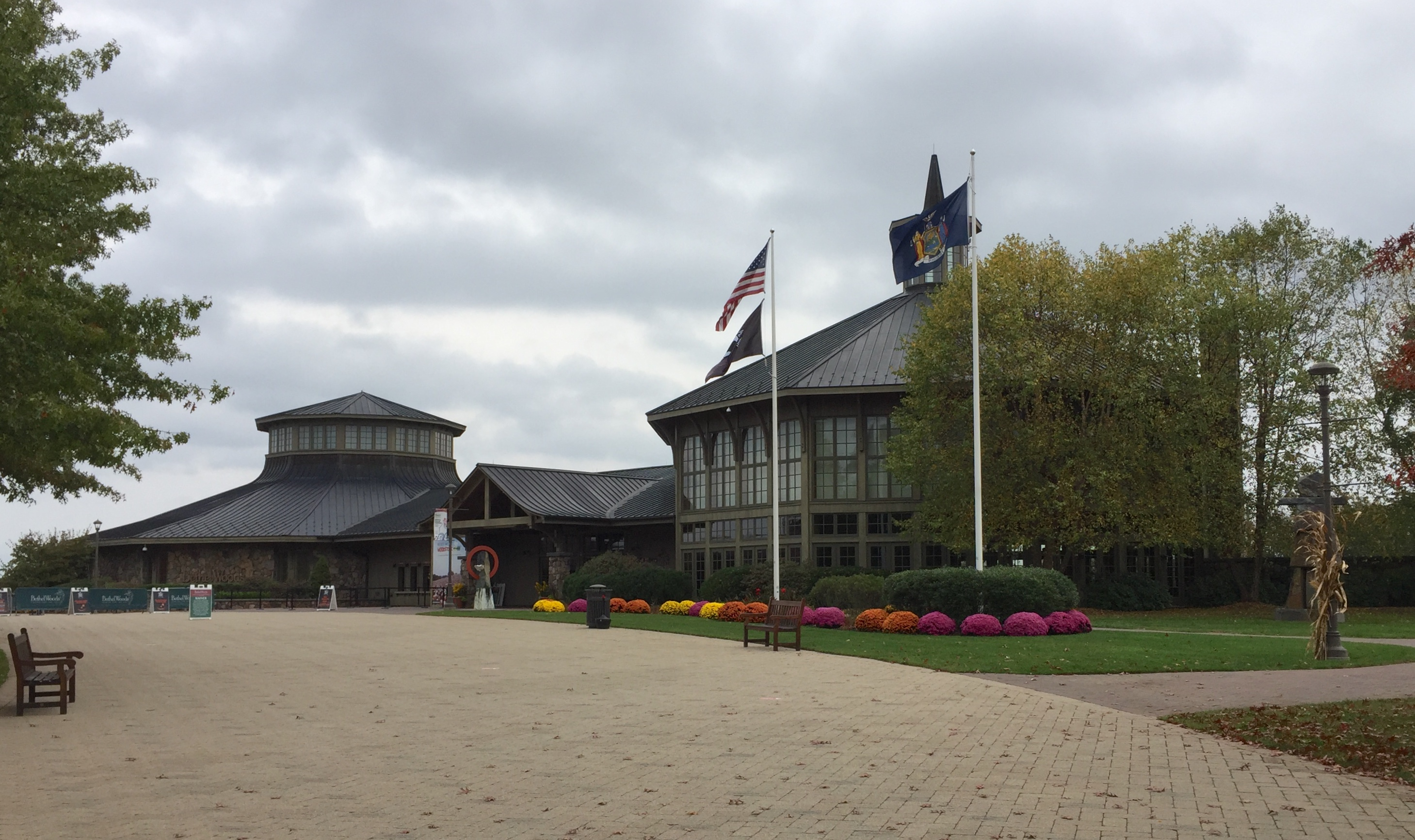
Museum at Bethel Woods

The Museum at Bethel Woods opened in June 2006. It aims to explore the unique experience of the 1969 Woodstock Music & Art Fair and its significance as a culminating event of a decade of radical cultural transformation, along with the continuing legacies of both the 1960s and Woodstock.

Permanent exhibits include The Sixties, The Woodstock Festival, Three Days of Peace and Music, and Impact of Woodstock & The Sixties, each featuring film and interactive displays, text panels, and collections of artifacts.

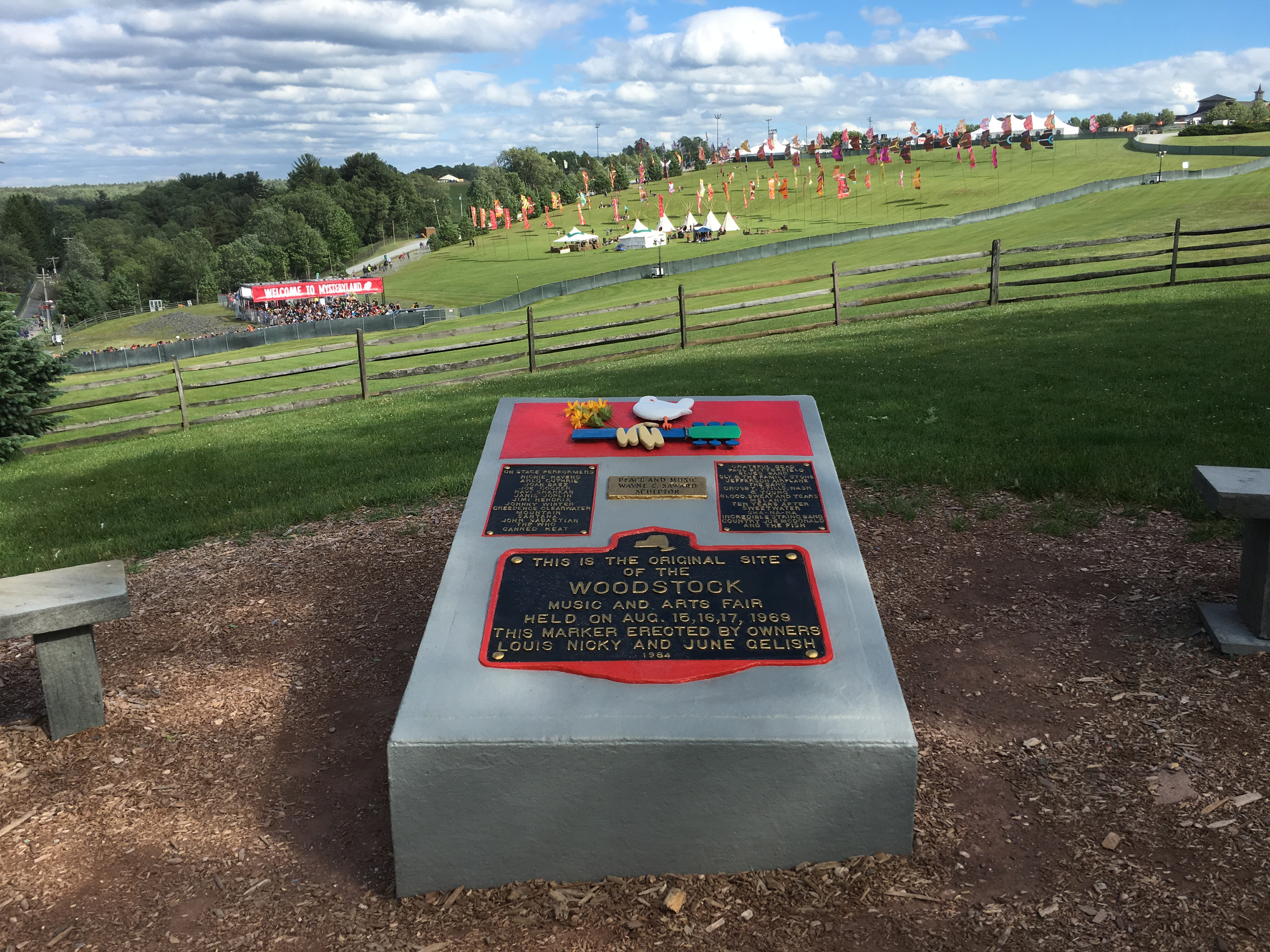
Monument at the site of the 1969 Woodstock festival, installed in 1984.

In addition to information about the music festival, which is about two-thirds of the museum's scope, the museum offers exhibits, personal stories and a multimedia experience about various aspects of the 1960s, including music, fashion and political protest. It focuses on issues such as the baby boom, Cold War, Vietnam War, Civil Rights Movement, and the assassinations and riots that occurred during the decade, all of which contribute to the context of Woodstock. The 7,000-square-foot (650 m^{2}) museum includes a 132-seat high-definition theater and a 4,300-square-foot (400 m^{2}) gallery, as well as classrooms, a cafe, a museum shop, and a patio. A special exhibit gallery opened in 2009.

The Museum, and Bethel Woods Museum Development Group CEO Michael Egan, were the recipients of a 2010 Thea Award for excellence in themed entertainment.

== Economic impact ==
Bethel Woods offers programs nine months out of the year. Opening the center helped revive tourism, which suffered in the region following the closure of many resorts following the decline of the Borscht Belt. Sullivan County has struggled with the legacy of Woodstock, and officials hoped the museum would help with reconciliation. The opening of the performing arts center in 2006, led to increased development in Bethel, along the Route 17B corridor, and in nearby Kauneonga Lake (formerly North White Lake), and is one of the county's larger economic development programs, despite the initial controversy surrounding some of its funding. A Bethel Woods report from 2018 indicated that $560.82 million of spending has been generated in New York. With 2.9 million visitors since 2006 and 214,405 visitors in 2018, an equivalent of 172 full-time jobs exist as a result, which includes direct wages of $5.1 million from Bethel Woods in Sullivan County.

== See also ==
- List of contemporary amphitheatres
