= John P. Roberts =

American businessman (1945–2001)

- Born: December 11, 1945
- Died: October 27, 2001 (aged 55)
- Occupations: Concert promoter, producer
- Known for: Woodstock Festival

John P. Roberts (December 11, 1945 – October 27, 2001) was an American businessman who bankrolled the Woodstock Festival. He was the heir to the Polident/Poli-Grip denture adhesive fortune.

== Biography ==
Grew up in Manhattan and summered in Deal, NJ. Graduate of St. Bernard's School. After graduating from the University of Pennsylvania Roberts and his friend Joel Rosenman tried to pitch a story for a television series about entrepreneurs who had more money than ideas. Each week their antics would get them into a new series of problems.

Roberts and Rosenman had met at a golf course in 1966 and shared an apartment in 1967.

To do research they placed an advertisement in The Wall Street Journal identifying themselves as "young men with unlimited capital" who were looking for business ideas. Among the 5,000 responding were Michael Lang and Artie Kornfeld who proposed building a recording studio in Woodstock, New York to encourage recordings by local residents Bob Dylan, Jimi Hendrix and The Band. Eventually this idea was dropped in favor of staging an outdoor music festival.

As they developed a plan, once it became clear there was no area around Woodstock that would meet their requirements, they moved the proposed location to Wallkill, New York. But protests from local residents prompted another move in turn to its eventual site in Bethel, New York.

The concert cost between $2.4 million and $3.1 million to produce and brought in $1.8 million from gate receipts. While the producers would make money on the movie and soundtrack of the events, Roberts said he did not get out of debt from the event until 1980.

After the concert they produced subsequent events of the same type and operated a leveraged buyout firm in Manhattan.

Roberts lived in Manhattan, where he died of cancer on October 27, 2001, at the age of 55.

== Portrayals ==
In the 2009 film Taking Woodstock he is portrayed by Skylar Astin.
