= Michael Lang (producer) =

American concert promoter and record producer (1944–2022)

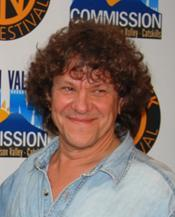
- Lang in 2009
- Born: December 11, 1944; New York City, U.S.
- Died: January 8, 2022 (aged 77); New York City, U.S.
- Occupations: Concert promoter, producer
- Known for: Woodstock Festival
- Children: 5

Michael Scott Lang (December 11, 1944 – January 8, 2022) was an American concert promoter, producer, and artistic manager who was best known as a co-creator of the Woodstock Music & Art Festival in 1969. Lang was the organizer of the event, as well as the organizer for its follow-up events, Woodstock '94 and Woodstock '99. He later became a producer of records, films, and other concerts, as well as a manager for performing artists, an author, and a sculptor.

== Early life ==
Lang was born in Brooklyn, New York City, to a Jewish-American family.

In 1967, Lang dropped out of New York University and moved to Coconut Grove, Florida, to open a head shop. In 1968, after promoting a series of concert events in the Miami area, Lang (with Marshall Brevetz) produced the 1968 Pop & Underground Festival. It drew approximately 25,000 people on day one (May 18) and featured Jimi Hendrix, Frank Zappa, John Lee Hooker, Arthur Brown and Blue Cheer. On the afternoon of the second day (May 19), it started to rain and the event ended early.

== Career ==
=== Woodstock Festivals 1969, 1994, 1999, 2019 ===
After he moved to Woodstock, New York, and met Artie Kornfeld, the two developed the concept for a major festival event to celebrate the 1960s social movements and planned to open a recording studio in the town of Woodstock. With Kornfeld and partners John P. Roberts and Joel Rosenman, Lang initiated the planning of the Woodstock festival, which was held on Max Yasgur's farm in Bethel, New York, August 15–18, 1969.

Michael Lang was featured in many scenes of the documentary film Woodstock: 3 Days of Peace & Music (1970).

Lang also produced Woodstock '94 with partners Roberts, Rosenman, and co-producer John Scher, and Woodstock '99 with John Scher and Ossie Kilkenny. In contrast to the previous Woodstock festivals Lang organized, Woodstock '99 proved to be more chaotic and violent.

In May 2014, Lang revealed plans for a possible fiftieth anniversary of the first Woodstock concert to be held in 2019, and that he was exploring various locations.

On January 9, 2019, Lang announced the official Woodstock 50 festival would take place August 16–18, 2019, in Watkins Glen, New York. However, the event was cancelled after confronting many logistical issues, financial backing issues, and three venue changes.

In September 2021, about three months before his death, Lang was interviewed for a three-part Netflix documentary called Trainwreck: Woodstock '99, detailing how the festival of the same name became a catastrophe.

=== Altamont free concert ===
Lang was not among the producers of the December 6, 1969, Altamont Free Concert that some had billed as a "Woodstock West". However, Lang was asked by the Rolling Stones and Grateful Dead to assist with the last-moment re-location, from Sears Point Raceway to the Altamont Speedway, near Tracy, California.

Initially, the concert was planned for Golden Gate Park and was to feature the Rolling Stones, Grateful Dead, Santana, Jefferson Airplane, The Flying Burrito Brothers, and Crosby, Stills, Nash & Young. The city of San Francisco revoked the permits for the Golden Gate venue, ostensibly due to a San Francisco 49ers football game at Kezar Stadium, located in the park on the scheduled date. Subsequently, the concert was moved to Sears Point Raceway. However, a dispute over film rights led to its cancellation. Lang and Grateful Dead manager Rock Scully were then offered the Altamont Speedway—a rival to Sears Point Raceway—by owner Dick Carter. After the venue was set for the concert, Lang appeared, with his experience in moving the much-larger Woodstock festival. The venue was moved on December 4 to the racetrack with the concert starting December 6.

The venue change created major technical problems, including a stage built too low and close to the fans. The Hells Angels were then hired for stage security, which resulted in numerous fights with concertgoers, as well as an on-stage altercation with members of Jefferson Airplane, in which singer Marty Balin was struck and knocked unconscious. Audience member Meredith Hunter was stabbed and killed when he rushed the stage with a revolver while the Rolling Stones were performing. These incidents were captured on film and appear in the Maysles Brothers documentary film Gimme Shelter (1970). There were also three accidental deaths among the crowd of 300,000.

Lang is briefly seen in the film. He last appears onstage, walking away during the scuffle on the stage between the Hells Angels and the Jefferson Airplane.

=== Just Sunshine Records ===
Lang owned and operated Just Sunshine Records, which produced and released more than 40 albums by such diverse musical artists as Karen Dalton, Betty Davis and Mississippi Fred McDowell. Lang also managed several successful international recording artists, including Joe Cocker, Rickie Lee Jones, Willy DeVille, Tarkan, and Spanish recording artists El Ultimo de la Fila. The label was active and distributed by Gulf & Western's Famous Music Group from 1971 until 1974.

=== Joe Cocker ===
Shortly after the Woodstock Music and Arts Fair in 1969, Lang began managing Joe Cocker, who appeared at the original Woodstock concert. Their professional relationship continued for more than twenty years. Lang made an appearance in Cocker's "You Can Leave Your Hat On" music video as a flugelhorn player.

=== Later years ===
Lang was associate producer of Wes Anderson's film Bottle Rocket (1996).

The Michael Lang Organization (MLO) encompasses live event production, film production, and artist management. Projects included a fiftieth anniversary event for the Lincoln Center featuring the French Theater company Royal de luxe, a Woodstock fiftieth anniversary event planned for summer 2019 that ultimately was cancelled, a movie version of the cult classic novel The Master and Margarita, and theater projects in Turkey and South Korea. Additionally, with his partners in Woodstock Ventures, Lang was developing future projects that included a Broadway musical based on Woodstock the musical and a Woodstock lifestyle brand.

MLO worked with the following artists: Outkast, Prince, Missy Elliott, Snoop Dogg, Steely Dan, The Fugees, Wyclef Jean, Tarkan, Shakira, Madonna, Norah Jones, Marc Anthony, Twista, Dave Matthews, Bruce Springsteen, Alicia Keys, Kid Rock, Red Hot Chili Peppers, Christina Aguilera, Linkin Park, Avril Lavigne and Joe Cocker.

In 2009, Woodstock Ventures (Michael Lang, Joel Rosenman, and the John Roberts estate) formed joint venture with Sony Music Entertainment and launched a new woodstock.com. The site celebrates the history of the original Woodstock Festival.

In the Ang Lee film Taking Woodstock (2009), Michael Lang is played by actor Jonathan Groff.

In 2009, Lang co-authored with Holly George-Warren The Road to Woodstock.

== Personal life ==
Lang was also a sculptor. He had five children. His first wife, vocalist Ann Lang, toured as a backup singer with Joe Cocker and Leon Russell, from 1970 to 1986.

On January 8, 2022, Lang's family announced he died of a rare form of non-Hodgkin's lymphoma at the Memorial Sloan Kettering Cancer Center in New York, New York. Lang was 77 years old.

== Sources ==
- Roberts, John; Rosenman, Joel; Pilpel, Robert H. (1974). Young Men with Unlimited Capital: The Inside Story of the Legendary Woodstock Festival Told By The Two People Who Paid for It (1st ed.). New York: Harcourt Brace Jovanovich. ISBN 9780151559770. OCLC 922819.
- The Road to Woodstock by Michael Lang. Ecco Publishing, 2009. ISBN 978-0-06-157655-3.
- Michael Wadleigh, Richie Havens, Joan Baez, Jimi Hendrix, Pete Townshend et al. (1970). Woodstock 3 Days of Peace and Music. ISBN 0-7907-2935-0.
- Michael Lang, Artie Kornfeld, Joel Rosenman, John Roberts, Michael Richards (1995). Woodstock 1969 Music Festival: The Creation of The Birth of a Generation. Virtue Films. OCLC 34800689.
