= Alan Gerry =

American businessman (born 1929)

- Born: December 24, 1929 (age 96); Liberty, New York, U.S.
- Occupation: Businessman
- Known for: founder of Cablevision Industries
- Spouse: Sandra E. Gerry
- Children: 3

Alan Gerry (born December 24, 1929) is an American billionaire and founder of Cablevision Industries.

== Early life and education ==
Gerry was born to a Jewish family in Liberty, New York, the son of immigrants from Russia. His father was a frozen food distributor. After high school, he joined the U.S. Marine Corps where he was placed in the electronics program and afterward he studied television repair on the G.I. Bill.

== Career ==
In 1951, he started a television sales, installation and repair business in a converted grain elevator in his hometown. Concerned with the poor reception in his hometown, which impacted television sales due to the mountainous terrain, he installed antennas on the top of many of the surrounding mountains in order to provide reception to the people who lived in the valleys or lived on the hillsides not facing New York City. In 1956, he convinced seven local businessmen to invest in starting a local cable television system utilizing large "community antennas" on mountaintops which gathered the signal and then transferred it via cable to the individual homeowners. The company was named Liberty Video. He opened a store purely focused on television sales but soon realized that after an initial surge in sales, the recurring cash flows from cable subscribers was where the income was. In the early 1970s, he bought out his original partners and expanded into Pennsylvania and Massachusetts renaming the company Cablevision Industries. In the early 1980s, he installed the East Coast's first high-powered microwave delivery system, creating 100,000 house sub-clusters. Thereafter, he expanded into Florida, the Carolinas and the Mid-Atlantic States and was one of the first cable operators to deploy fiber optic cable. In 1996, he sold Cablevision Industries - then the 8th largest cable company and the largest privately owned cable company in the United States with 64 cable systems covering 1.3 million subscribers in 18 states - to Time Warner Cable for $2.7 billion,

Gerry founded and presently serves as chairman and CEO of Granite Associates, L.P., a diversified investment company focused on start up companies involved in telephony and communications.

== Philanthropy and accolades ==
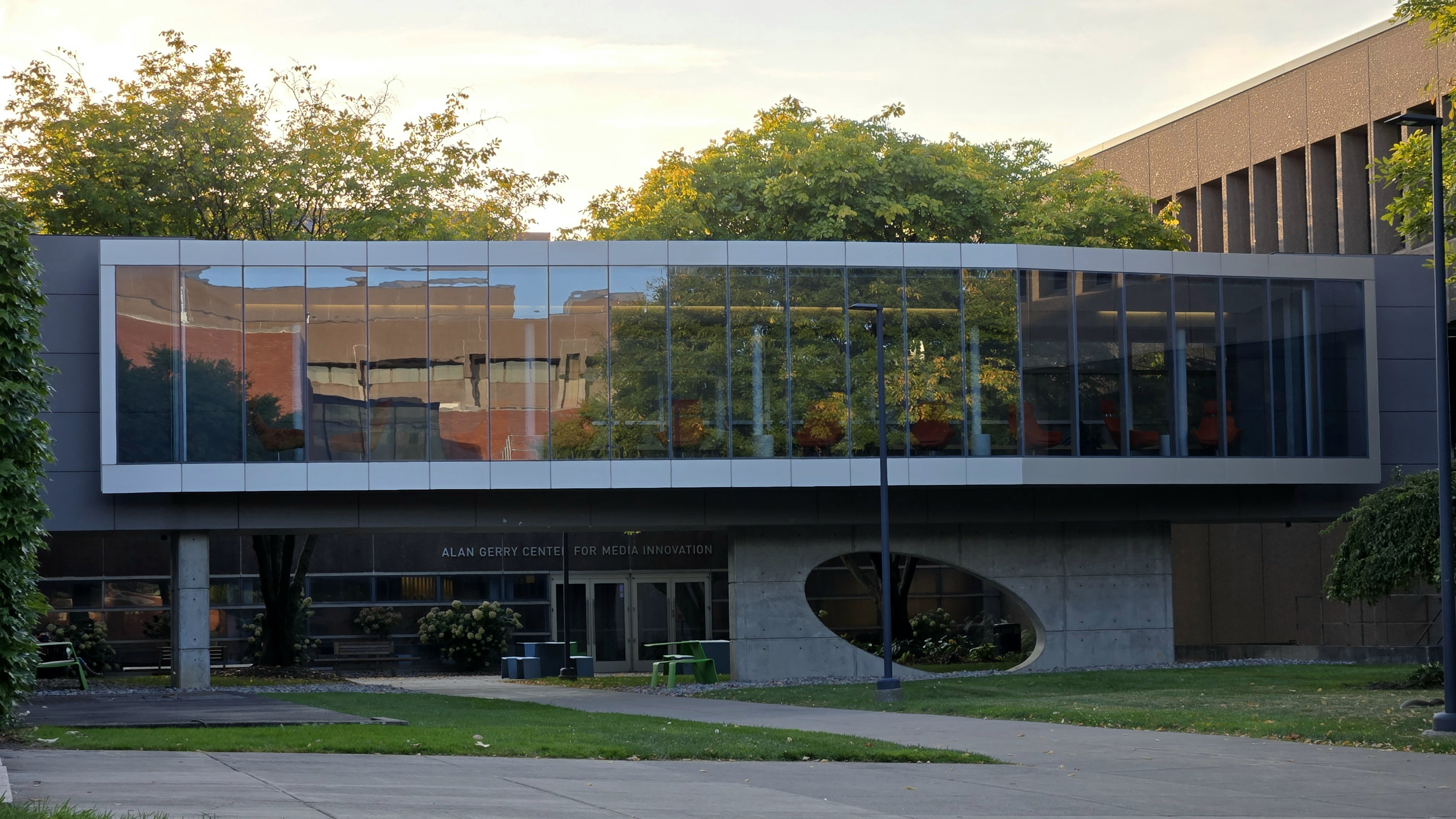
Alan Gerry Center for Media Innovation at Syracuse University.

Gerry created the Gerry Foundation, an organization established to stimulate economic activity and revitalization in Sullivan County, New York. In 1997, Gerry purchased and resurrected the original 1969 Woodstock Festival site from Charles and June Gelish (who themselves bought it from Max Yasgur when he retired in 1973), naming it the Bethel Woods Center for the Arts in Bethel, New York. Gerry donated $10 million to the National Cable Center in Denver. Gerry endowed a chair of orthopedic surgery at Harvard Medical School, established the Paul Gerry Dialysis Center in Sayre, Pennsylvania, funded the addition of a wing on his local hospital, and is involved in a program at Boston University to find a cure for amyloidosis.

In 1995, Gerry was awarded the Vanguard Award, cable television's honor for distinguished leadership. In 1998, he received the Golden Plate Award of the American Academy of Achievement. In 2000, he was inducted into the Cable Television Hall of Fame. Gerry received the Entrepreneur-of-the-Year Award from the New England chapter of the Institute of American Entrepreneurs, the Distinguished Citizen Award from the Boy Scouts of America, and the Americanism Award from the Anti-Defamation League. He has received an Honorary Doctorate of Business Administration from Roger Williams University and an Honorary Doctorate of Humane Letters from the State University of New York.

In 2014, Gerry donated $5 million for the renovations to Newhouse 2 complex at the S.I. Newhouse School of Public Communications at Syracuse University.

== Personal life ==
He is married to Sandra Gerry, an educator and former teacher; they have two daughters and a son: Annelise Gerry, Robyn Gerry, and Adam Gerry.
