= Sullivan County International Airport =

General aviation airport in Monticello, New York

Sullivan County Airport
- IATA: MSV; ICAO: KMSV; FAA LID: MSV

Summary
- Airport type: Public
- Owner: Sullivan County Division of Public Works
- Serves: Monticello, New York
- Location: Town of Bethel
- Elevation AMSL: 1,403 ft / 428 m
- Coordinates: 41°42′06″N 074°47′42″W

Map
- Location

Runways
Direction	Length		Surface
Direction	ft	m	Surface
15/33	6,298	1,920	Asphalt

Statistics (2011)
- Aircraft operations: 28,650
- Based aircraft: 41
- Sources: FAA and Sullivan County

Sullivan County Airport (IATA: MSV, ICAO: KMSV, FAA LID: MSV) is in Bethel, Sullivan County, New York. It is seven miles northwest of Monticello, a village in the Town of Thompson. The National Plan of Integrated Airport Systems for 2011–2015 categorized it as a general aviation facility.

Built in the 1960s, the airport is now a Part 139 certified airport capable of handling business jets.

== Facilities ==
The airport covers 600 acres (243 ha) at an elevation of 1,403 feet (428 m). Its runway, 15/33, is 6,298 by 150 feet (1,920 x 46 m) asphalt.

In the year ending October 31, 2011, the airport had 28,650 aircraft operations, average 78 per day: 99% general aviation and 1% air taxi. 41 aircraft were then based at the airport: 78% single-engine, 10% multi-engine, 7% jet, and 5% helicopter.

== See also ==
- List of airports in New York
