= Bikur Cholim B'nai Israel Synagogue =

Historic synagogue in San Lake, New York, United States

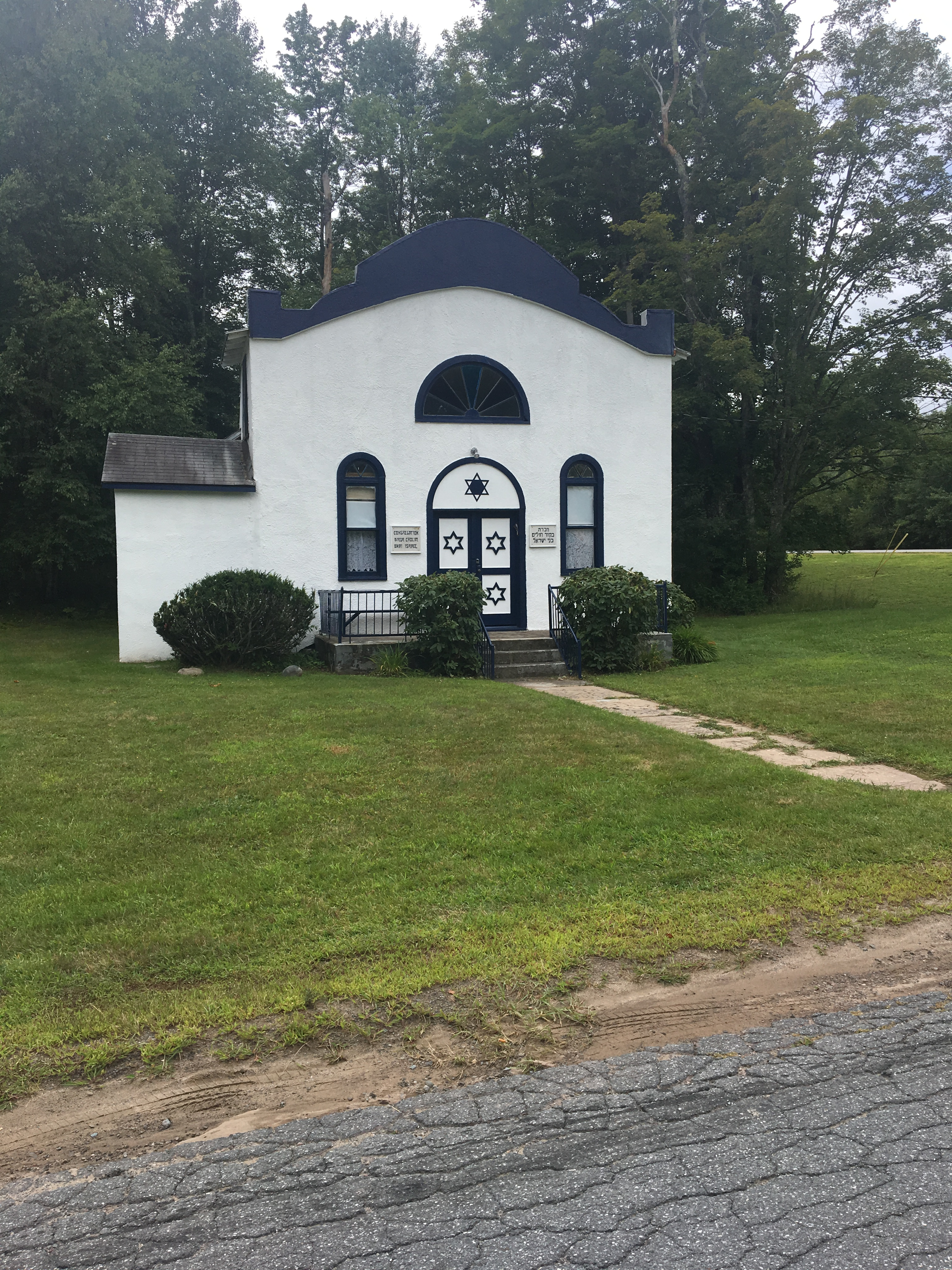
- The synagogue in 2017

- Location in New York

Religion
- Affiliation: Orthodox Judaism
- Rite: Nusach Ashkenaz
- Ecclesiastical or organizational status: Synagogue
- Leadership: Lay-led
- Status: Active (High Holidays only)

Location
- Location: Swan Lake, Sullivan County, New York
- Country: United States
- Interactive map of Bikur Cholim B'nai Israel Synagogue
- Coordinates: 41°42′54″N 74°47′59″W

Architecture
- Type: Synagogue architecture
- Style: Art Deco
- Completed: 1926

Website
- littleblueshul.com
- Bikur Cholim B'nai Israel Synagogue
- U.S. National Register of Historic Places
- Area: less than one acre
- NRHP reference No.: 98001619
- Added to NRHP: January 15, 1999

Bikur Cholim B'nai Israel Synagogue, nicknamed as the Little Blue Shul, is a historic Orthodox Jewish congregation and synagogue, located in Swan Lake, Sullivan County, New York, in the United States.

The synagogue was built in 1926 and is a small, 1 1/2-story wood-frame building with a stucco finish. It was added to the National Register of Historic Places in 1999.

It is currently used annually three days a year for High Holiday services on Rosh Hashanah and Yom Kippur.
