= Kauneonga Lake, New York =

- Hamlet and CDP
- The abandoned Kenmore Hotel along NY 55 in 1977.

- Location within New York Location within the United States
- Coordinates: 41°41′28″N 74°50′09″W
- Country: United States
- State: New York
- County: Sullivan

Area
  - Total: 1.34 sq mi (3.46 km^{2})
  - Land: 1.14 sq mi (2.96 km^{2})
  - Water: 0.18 sq mi (0.46 km^{2})
- Elevation: 1,348 ft (411 m)
- Time zone: UTC-5 (Eastern (EST))
  - Summer (DST): UTC-4 (EDT)
- ZIP code: 12749
- Area code: 845
- GNIS feature ID: 954409

Kauneonga Lake is a hamlet in the Town of Bethel, Sullivan County, New York, United States. The community is located along New York State Route 55, 8 miles (13 km) west-northwest of Monticello. Kauneonga Lake has a post office with ZIP code 12749.
