= Joel Rosenman =

American businessman

Joel Rosenman (born 1942) conceived and co-created the Woodstock Festival in 1969. Rosenman thought of the idea for the three-day concert when he and business partner John Roberts were evaluating a proposal from Michael Lang and Artie Kornfeld for a recording studio in upstate New York. The four went on to create the event. Rosenman and Roberts are the co-authors of Making Woodstock, originally published as Young Men with Unlimited Capital, a non-fiction account of their exploits as producers of Woodstock.

== Childhood and education ==
Born the second of three children, Rosenman grew up on Long Island in the town of Cold Spring Harbor, New York. He is Jewish. He attended Princeton University followed by Yale Law School, but sought a career as a professional musician.

== Early career and Mediasound ==
In 1967, after hearing Rosenman perform at The Bitter End in Greenwich Village, John Hammond, then head of A&R at Columbia Records, offered Rosenman a recording contract as a vocalist. Rosenman opted instead for a career in writing and venture capital with friend, and then partner, John P. Roberts.

In 1967, Rosenman and Roberts drafted the pilot episode of a situation comedy based on two young men looking for investment opportunities. In search of plot material for the series, they placed a classified ad in The New York Times and The Wall Street Journal claiming to be "Young men with unlimited capital" looking for "legitimate and interesting...business proposals." Rosenman and Roberts received hundreds of responses, some of which were attractive enough to warrant evaluation as real investments. Through this channel they were presented with the opportunity to build Mediasound Studios, which later led to Woodstock.

== Portrayals ==
In Ang Lee’s 2009 film Taking Woodstock Rosenman is portrayed by Daniel Eric Gold. Rosenman also appears in other Woodstock-related books, films, TV shows, interviews, panels.
