= The Road to Woodstock =

2009 book by Michael Lang

- Author: Michael Lang; Holly George-Warren
- Language: English
- Subject: Woodstock Festival
- Genre: Non-fiction
- Publication date: 2009

The Road to Woodstock is a 2009 book by Michael Lang and Holly George-Warren describing Lang's involvement in creation of the Woodstock Music & Arts Festival.
