= Smallwood, New York =

Census-designated place in New York, US

- CDP & hamlet
- Location of Smallwood in Sullivan County, New York
- Coordinates: 41°39′38″N 74°48′52″W
- Country: United States
- State: New York
- County: Sullivan

Area
  - Total: 2.53 sq mi (6.55 km^{2})
  - Land: 2.40 sq mi (6.22 km^{2})
  - Water: 0.12 sq mi (0.32 km^{2})
- Elevation: 1,201 ft (366 m)

Population (2020)
  - Total: 839
  - Density: 349.2/sq mi (134.83/km^{2})
- Time zone: UTC-5 (Eastern (EST))
  - Summer (DST): UTC-4 (EDT)
- ZIP code: 12778
- Area code: 845
- FIPS code: 36-67730
- GNIS feature ID: 0965447

Smallwood is a hamlet (and census-designated place) in Sullivan County, New York, United States. The population was 839 at the 2020 census.

Smallwood is in the southeastern section of, and is a hamlet within, the town of Bethel. It was founded in the 1920s as the vacation community "Mountain Lakes", but was later renamed after its founder A.N. Smallwood.

== History ==
Smallwood is known for its early 20th-century-style log cabins and camps constructed by immigrants in the 1930s. A unique feature of the community is that the original home construction materials were locally sourced: Smallwood cabins were constructed of wood harvested and milled on site, and the distinctive stone fireplaces found in most cabins were built of limestone quarried in Smallwood from the 1920s through the 1950s. Most of these historic cabin structures survive as both summer and year-round residences.

The Smallwood development, as envisioned by developer A.N. Smallwood, was originally a "restricted" community, i.e., homes were available only to individuals who were eligible for membership in the Mountain Lakes Country Club, which was restricted to "caucasians of the Christian faith," according to literature and sales brochures. This began to change in the 1940s, but many deeds contained exclusionary covenants into the 1950s. Since the latter part of that century the community has become very diverse, comprising local year-round residents as well as summer-home owners who hail primarily from the New York City metropolitan area and South Florida.

Municipal tap water for many Smallwood homes is only available on a seasonal basis from April to October. Other homes, which have been winterized, have wells.

== Recreation ==
Centrally located in the hamlet of Smallwood, Mountain Lake is a private holding of the Smallwood Civic Association. Only dues-paying members of the sssociation have access to the approximate 65-acre man-made lake and other facilities owned and operated by the SWCA such as a beach, tennis and pickelball courts, basketball court, playground, ball field, and lodge. Minnie Falls is a popular waterfall and part of a large public park operated under the Bethel town government, and called the Forest Reserve at Smallwood. The reserve features hiking trails for year-round outdoor activities as well as a large dog park. The falls are part of White Lake Brook, a water system which, upon entering Smallwood, becomes Mountain Lake and upon crossing over the lake's dam becomes White Lake Brook again.

== Geography ==
Smallwood is located at 41°39′38″N 74°48′52″W (41.660573, -74.814507).

According to the United States Census Bureau, the CDP has a total area of 1.6 square miles (4.1 km^{2}), of which 1.5 square miles (3.9 km^{2}) is land and 0.1 square miles (0.26 km^{2}) (6.06%) is water.

== Demographics ==
Historical population
Census	Pop.	Note	%±
2000	566		—
2010	580		2.5%
2020	839		44.7%
U.S. Decennial Census

As of the census of 2000, there were 566 people, 259 households, and 148 families residing in the CDP. The population density was 365.5 inhabitants per square mile (141.1/km^{2}). There were 1,012 housing units at an average density of 653.5 per square mile (252.3/km^{2}). The racial makeup of the CDP was 96.47% White, 0.88% African American, 0.71% Native American, 0.88% from other races, and 1.06% from two or more races. Hispanic or Latino of any race were 3.53% of the population.

There were 259 households, out of which 22.0% had children under the age of 18 living with them, 46.3% were married couples living together, 8.9% had a female householder with no husband present, and 42.5% were non-families. 36.3% of all households were made up of individuals, and 15.8% had someone living alone who was 65 years of age or older. The average household size was 2.17 and the average family size was 2.86.

In the CDP, the population was spread out, with 20.0% under the age of 18, 5.1% from 18 to 24, 24.9% from 25 to 44, 30.7% from 45 to 64, and 19.3% who were 65 years of age or older. The median age was 45 years. For every 100 females, there were 97.2 males. For every 100 females age 18 and over, there were 100.4 males.

The median income for a household in the CDP was $46,845, and the median income for a family was $52,396. Males had a median income of $50,104 versus $50,375 for females. The per capita income for the CDP was $31,035. About 6.9% of families and 8.9% of the population were below the poverty line, including 10.3% of those under age 18 and 19.4% of those age 65 or over.

Originally developed in the 1930s as a seasonal lake community, most homes in Smallwood were built for summer use. While many have since been winterized or replaced with year-round residences, full-time residents make up only a small fraction of the population. A significant number of homes serve as second residences for New York City weekenders, with the seasonal population peaking between late April—when seasonal water service is activated—and October. Despite the community's historically restrictive founding covenants, Smallwood's seasonal population has grown diverse, comprising significant Jewish, LGBTQ+, Black, Latino, and Asian American communities that contrast with the demographics of the permanent resident base.
