= Bethel, New York =

- Town
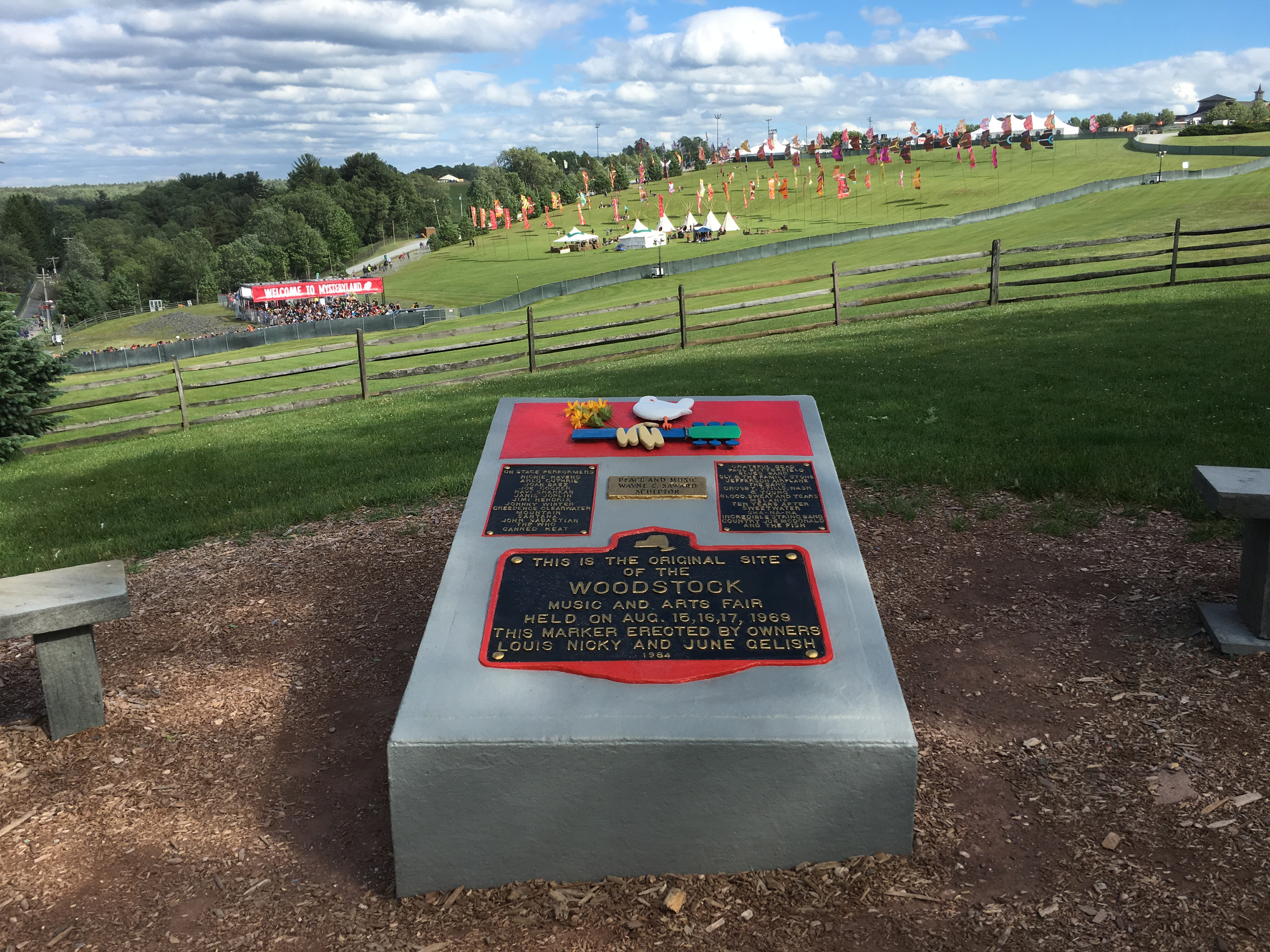
- 1969 Woodstock Monument

- Seal
- Motto: Home of the 1969 Original Woodstock Festival
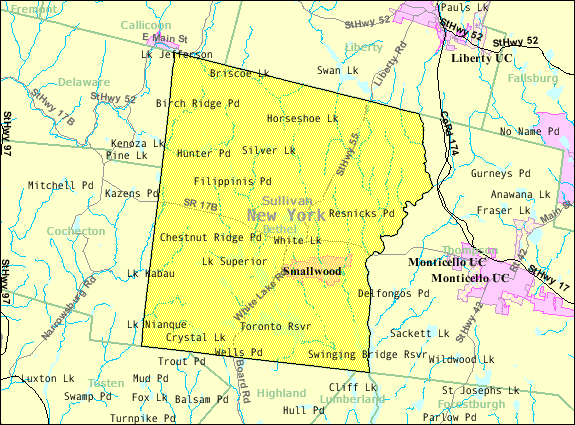
- U.S. Census map

- Coordinates: 41°41′27″N 74°50′30″W
- Country: United States
- State: New York
- County: Sullivan

Area
  - Total: 89.96 sq mi (232.99 km^{2})
  - Land: 85.27 sq mi (220.84 km^{2})
  - Water: 4.69 sq mi (12.15 km^{2})
- Elevation: 1,322 ft (403 m)

Population (2020)
  - Total: 3,959
- Time zone: UTC-5 (Eastern (EST))
  - Summer (DST): UTC-4 (EDT)
- ZIP Code: 12720
- Area code: 845
- FIPS code: 36-06310
- GNIS feature ID: 0978730
- Website: townofbethelny.gov

Bethel is a town in Sullivan County, New York, United States. The population was estimated at 3,959 in 2020. The town received worldwide attention after it served as the location of Woodstock in 1969, which was originally planned for Wallkill, New York, but was relocated to Bethel after Wallkill withdrew.

== History ==
The first European settlers arrived circa 1795 near the present communities of Bethel and White Lake. The town of Bethel was established in 1809 from the town of Lumberland. It was named after Bethel.

By the middle of the 19th century, a tourist industry began to grow. Bethel was home to numerous hotels that were part of the "Borscht Belt" and numerous sleepaway camps for most of the 20th century, including Camp Ma-Ho-Ge, Camp Chipinaw, and Camp Ranger – all on Silver Lake. In 1961, Son of Sam mass murderer David Berkowitz was a camper at a now defunct summer camp in Bethel. Berkowitz left the camp after a suspicious fire occurred in his cabin.

== Geography ==
According to the United States Census Bureau, the town has a total area of 90.0 square miles (233 km^{2}), of which 85.4 square miles (221 km^{2}) is land and 4.6 square miles (12 km^{2}) (5.13%) is water. One of the most attractive features of Bethel is its access to numerous lakes, all within a five-minute drive of each other. They include White Lake, its northern portion known as Kauneonga Lake, Silver Lake, and Lake Superior, which is part of the state park with the same name.

The Town of Bethel, which is primarily rural in character, was part of the old Borscht Belt Catskills resort area. Although some bungalow colonies continue to exist, catering to a largely Orthodox Jewish clientele during the summer, most of the old resorts which had their heyday from the 1930s to the early 1970s have long since closed.

== Demographics ==
Historical population
Census	Pop.	Note	%±
1820	1,096		—
1830	1,203		9.8%
1840	1,483		23.3%
1850	2,087		40.7%
1860	2,854		36.8%
1870	2,736		−4.1%
1880	2,562		−6.4%
1890	2,158		−15.8%
1900	2,248		4.2%
1910	2,164		−3.7%
1920	1,849		−14.6%
1930	1,799		−2.7%
1940	2,321		29.0%
1950	2,351		1.3%
1960	2,366		0.6%
1970	2,763		16.8%
1980	3,335		20.7%
1990	3,693		10.7%
2000	4,362		18.1%
2010	4,255		−2.5%
2020	3,959		−7.0%
U.S. Decennial Census

At the time of the census of 2000, there were 4,362 people, 1,649 households, and 1,101 families residing in the town. The population density was 51.1 inhabitants per square mile (19.7/km^{2}). There were 3,641 housing units at an average density of 42.6 per square mile (16.4/km^{2}). The racial makeup of the town in 2000 was 80.35% White, 11.28% Hispanic or Latino of any race, 4.61% African American, 2.80% other races, 1.40% two or more races, 0.50% Asian, 0.18% Native American, and 0.16% Pacific Islander.

There were 1,649 households, out of which 54.2% were married couples living together. 27.1% had children under the age of 18 living with them, 33.2% were non-families, 27.3% of all households were made up of individuals, and 12.0% had someone living alone who was 65 years of age or older. 7.9% had a female householder with no husband present. The average household size was 2.45 and the average family size was 2.95.

The ages of the town's residents included 28.7% from 45 to 64, 26.7% from 25 to 44, 21.8% under the age of 18, 16.0% who were 65 years of age or older, and 6.8% from 18 to 24. The median age was 42 years. For every 100 females, there were 108.4 males. For every 100 females at age 18 and over, there were 107.9 males.

The median income for a household in the town was $36,017, and the median income for a family was $37,321. Males had a median income of $35,025 versus $24,438 for females. The per capita income for the town was $25,335. About 9.4% of families and 14.9% of the population were below the poverty line, including 22.6% of those under age 18 and 10.4% of those age 65 or over.

== Communities and locations in Bethel ==
- Bethel – The hamlet of Bethel, located on Route 17B.
- Black Lake – A community on Route 55, south of the lake for which it is named.
- Briscoe – A hamlet near the northern town line on Route 144.
- Bushville – A hamlet in the northeast corner of the town on Route 75. The community was named for the bushes which covered the original town site.
- Hurd Settlement – A hamlet in the northwestern part of the town.
- Kauneonga Lake – A hamlet at the junction of Routes 141 and 55. This community was formerly called "North White Lake".
- Lake Superior State Park – located on the small lake for which it is named.
- Mongaup Valley – A community northeast of Smallwood.
- Smallwood – A hamlet, founded as the vacation community "Mountain Lakes", but later renamed after its founder A.N. Smallwood.
- Sullivan County International Airport – The airport is northeast of Kauneonga Lake.
- Swan Lake – The Bikur Cholim B'nai Israel Synagogue was listed on the National Register of Historic Places in 1999.
- White Lake – A hamlet on Route 17B that contains the Town Hall and is the largest community in the town.

== Woodstock festival ==
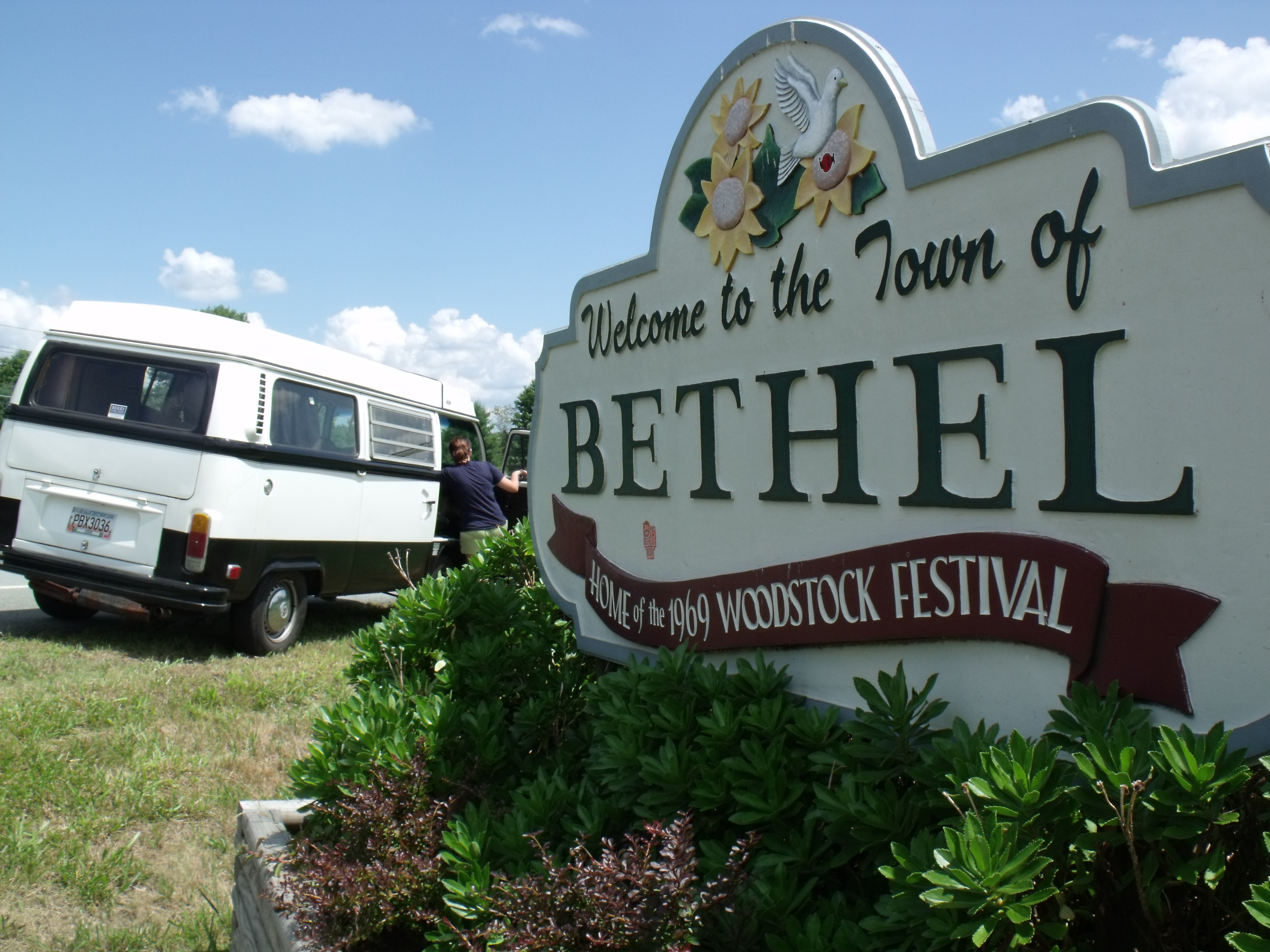
Roadtrippers with a vintage VW camper making a pilgrimage to Bethel, NY (circa 2012).

The Town of Bethel was brought to the world's attention in 1969, when nearly 500,000 people gathered at Max Yasgur's farm for "Three Days of Peace and Music". The documentary made about Woodstock released in 1970 showed interviews with numerous Bethel residents, including Art Vassmer, co-owner of Vassmers General Store in Kauneonga Lake. A movie called Taking Woodstock was released in August 2009 based on the book of the same title by Elliot Tiber, whose parents owned the nearby El Monaco Motel in White Lake and played a pivotal role in bringing the Woodstock nation to Bethel.

In 1998, a concert was hosted at the original site and this helped ignite the vision of philanthropist Alan Gerry and daughter Robyn to acquire the land and build what was to become Bethel Woods Center for the Arts.

On July 1, 2006, Bethel Woods Center for the Arts opened on the site of the original Woodstock Festival and hosted the New York Philharmonic. Crosby, Stills, Nash & Young closed out the inaugural season in August 2006, bringing the foursome back to Bethel for the first time since August 1969. The summer 2007 concert lineup at Bethel Woods began in June 2007 with the bands Chicago and America. Other performers during the summer of 2007 included the New York Philharmonic, Bob Dylan, Brad Paisley, Lynyrd Skynyrd with The Marshall Tucker Band, Earth, Wind & Fire, Arlo Guthrie, Richie Havens, Phish and others. The 2008 season featured the New York Philharmonic, the Boston Pops, Steely Dan, The Allman Brothers Band, and sold-out performances by the Jonas Brothers and the last concert of the season, featuring Heart, Journey and Cheap Trick. The 2009 season was headlined by Brad Paisley and his band "The Drama Kings".

In early 2008, The Museum at Bethel Woods opened near the original site of Max Yasgur's farm to complement the concert space. The multi-media interactive museum commemorates Woodstock and the Baby Boomer and hippie generation.

The state and the town council of Bethel subsequently passed laws prohibiting mass-event types of festivals. In 2019, a 50th anniversary celebration of Woodstock was organized in Sullivan County. The Woodstock 50 festival, scheduled for August, was canceled months earlier so it did not take place. The Bethel Woods Center for the Arts did organize a weekend of "low-key" concerts.
