= The Life and Times of Country Joe and the Fish =

Compilation album by Country Joe and the Fish
- Released: September 1971
- Recorded: October 1965 – May 1970
- Genres: Psychedelic rock; acid rock; folk rock
- Length: 1:10:30
- Label: Vanguard
- Producer: Sam Charters

Country Joe and the Fish chronology
| CJ Fish (1970) | The Life and Times of Country Joe and the Fish (1971) |

The Life and Times of Country Joe and the Fish is a compilation album by the American psychedelic rock band Country Joe and the Fish and was released on Vanguard Records in September 1971 (see 1971 in music). The album provides a summary of Country Joe and the Fish's history from their formation in 1965 to their disbandment in 1970, and also serves as a survey of their recording career during that span. Although the track listing is not in a specified chronological order, it does encompass a mixture of their most celebrated experimental and traditionally-structured compositions. All of the songs included on the original The Life and Times of Country Joe and the Fish album can all be found on the band's first five albums, Electric Music for the Mind and Body, I-Feel-Like-I'm-Fixin'-to-Die, Together, Here We Are Again, and CJ Fish.

The album includes the first appearance of the original folk and jug version of the group's best known song, "I Feel Like I'm Fixin' to Die Rag", outside the band's first EP released on the self-published Rag Baby magazine. A live rendition performed at the Woodstock Festival also concludes the album. Other live recordings featured on the album include "Superbird", "Marijuana", "Rock and Soul Music", "Masked Marauder", and "Love Machine". Of the singles included on the album, the only one to nationally chart was "Not So Sweet Lorraine", which manage to reach number 98 on the Billboard Hot 100.

The Life and Times of Country Joe and the Fish was the final album by the band to be distributed by Vanguard Records to chart nationally. Upon release, the album reached number 198 on the Billboard 200 and was commended for its good sound quality in comparison to Vanguard's later compilation albums.

== Track listing ==
=== Disc one - side one ===
1. "I Feel Like I'm Fixin' to Die Rag" - 3:41
2. "Bass Strings " - 3:56
3. "Flying High" - 2:29
4. "Porpoise Mouth" - 2:47
5. "An Untitled Protest" - 2:45
6. "Who Am I" - 4:06

=== Disc one - side two ===
1. "Grace" - 7:01
2. "Waltzing in the Moonlight" - 2:13
3. "Death Sound Blues" - 4:22
4. "Janis" - 2:36
5. "Sing Sing Sing" - 3:03

=== Disc two - side one ===
1. "Superbird (Tricky Dick)" - 5:20
2. "Not So Sweet Martha Lorraine" - 4:05
3. "Marijuana" - 2:29
4. "Rock and Soul Music / Love" - 6:29

=== Disc two - side two ===
1. "Crystal Blues " - 5:05
2. "Masked Marauder" - 4:16
3. "Love Machine" - 6:09
4. "The 'Fish' Cheer; I Feel-Like-I'm-Fixin'-to-Die Rag" - 3:01
