= Reunion (Country Joe and the Fish album) =

Studio album by Country Joe and the Fish
- Released: June 1977
- Recorded: January–April 1977
- Genre: Psychedelic rock, country rock
- Label: Fantasy
- Producer: Sam Charters

Country Joe and the Fish chronology
CJ Fish (1970)	Reunion (1977)

Reunion is the sixth and final studio album by the American psychedelic rock group Country Joe and the Fish, released in 1977. It constituted a reunion of the 1967 band's members. It was produced by Sam Charters for Fantasy Records and recorded between January and April 1977. The music is not as psychedelic, and several tracks are country rock. The album notably features songs written by every band member.

== Track listing ==
Side 1

1. "Come to the Reunion" (Gary Hirsh) – 3:03
2. "Time Flies By" (Joe McDonald) – 4:09
3. "Stateline, Nevada" (Barry Melton) – 2:03
4. "Love Is a Mystery" (Barry Melton) – 2:04
5. "Dirty Claus Rag" (Joe McDonald, B. Melton, Sam Charters, Phil Marsh) – 2:04
6. "Not So Sweet Martha Lorraine" (Joe McDonald) – 3:25

Side 2

7. "Thunderbird" (Joe McDonald) – 3:42
8. "Gibson's Song" (instrumental) (David Bennett Cohen) – 3:37
9. "No One Can Teach You How to Live" (Barry Melton) – 3:16
10. "Insufficient Funds" (Bruce Barthol, Phil Marsh) – 2:36
11. "Dreams" (David Bennett Cohen, Richardson) – 2:55

Total time: 35:32

== Personnel ==
Country Joe and The Fish

- Country Joe McDonald — vocals, acoustic guitar; trombone (track 3), harmonica (track 10)
- Barry Melton — vocals, electric and acoustic guitars, mandolin, Dobro; synthesizer (track 9)
- David Bennett Cohen — keyboards, acoustic and electric guitars
- Bruce Barthol — bass; vocals (track 10)
- Gary "Chicken" Hirsh — drums, percussion; sandblocks (track 5)

Additional personnel

- John Otis — congas
- Jim Price — horns
- Bobby Keys — horns
- Trevor Lawrence — horns
- Steve Madaio — horns
- Sam Charters — jug (track 5)
