= Washboard Sam =

American blues singer and musician (1910–1966)

Background information
- Born: Robert Clifford Brown; July 15, 1910; Walnut Ridge, Arkansas, United States
- Died: November 6, 1966 (aged 56) Chicago, Illinois, United States
- Genres: Blues
- Occupations: Singer, songwriter
- Instruments: Vocals, washboard
- Years active: 1920s–1960s
- Labels: Bluebird, Vocalion, RCA Victor, Folkways

Robert Clifford Brown (July 15, 1910 – November 6, 1966), known professionally as Washboard Sam, was an American blues musician and singer.

== Biography ==
Brown's date and place of birth are uncertain; many sources state that he was born in 1910 in Walnut Ridge, Arkansas, but the researchers Bob Eagle and Eric LeBlanc suggest that he was born in 1903 or 1904, in Jackson, Tennessee, on the basis of Social Security information. When applying for his musicians union card, he gave his birthdate as July 15, 1914. He was reputedly the half-brother of Big Bill Broonzy. He moved to Memphis, Tennessee, in the 1920s, performing as a street musician with Sleepy John Estes and Hammie Nixon. He moved to Chicago in 1932, performing regularly with Broonzy and other musicians, including Memphis Slim and Tampa Red, in many recording sessions for Lester Melrose of Bluebird Records.

In 1935, he began recording in his own right for both Bluebird and Vocalion Records, becoming one of the most popular Chicago blues performers of the late 1930s and 1940s, selling numerous records and playing to packed audiences. He recorded over 160 tracks in those decades. His strong voice and songwriting talent overcame his stylistic limitations.

By the 1950s, his audience had begun to shrink, largely because he had difficulty adapting to the new electric blues. His final recording session, for RCA Victor, was in 1949. He retired from music for several years and became a Chicago police officer. He recorded a session in 1953 with Broonzy and Memphis Slim. Samuel Charters included Brown's "I've Been Treated Wrong" on the compilation album The Country Blues for Folkways Records in 1959. Brown made a modest and short-lived comeback as a live performer in the early 1960s.

He died of heart disease in Chicago, in November 1966, and was buried in an unmarked grave at the Washington Memory Gardens Cemetery, in Homewood, Illinois.

== Memorial ==
A concert organized by the executive producer Steve Salter, of the Killer Blues organization, was held on September 18, 2009, at the Howmet Playhouse Theater, in Whitehall, Michigan, to raise money for a headstone for Washboard Sam's grave. The show was a success, and a headstone was placed in October 2009. The concert was recorded by Vinyl Wall Productions and filmed for television broadcast in the central Michigan area by a television crew from Central Michigan University. It featured musical artists such as Washboard Jo and R.B. and Co. and was headlined by the Big House Blues Band.
