= Here We Are Again (album) =

Studio album by Country Joe and the Fish
- Released: June 1969
- Recorded: January – March 1969
- Studio: Pacific High (San Francisco)
- Genre: Psychedelic rock; folk rock
- Length: 36:15
- Label: Vanguard
- Producer: Samuel Charters

Country Joe and the Fish chronology
Together (1968)	Here We Are Again (1969)	CJ Fish (1970)

Professional ratings
Review scores
Source	Rating
Billboard	(positive)
Rolling Stone	(negative)

Here We Are Again is the fourth album by the psychedelic rock band Country Joe and the Fish. It was released in 1969 with the US catalog number Vanguard VSD 79299. It peaked on the Billboard 200 at number 48, and stayed on the charts for eleven weeks. Only "Country Joe" McDonald and Barry "The Fish" Melton remained from the original lineup, which had begun breaking up since the previous album. Past members would appear as guest musicians though. The songs were composed by McDonald and Melton. The album was produced by Sam Charters.

In addition to McDonald (vocals, guitar) and Melton (lead guitar, vocals), founding members of Country Joe and The Fish—Gary "Chicken" Hirsh on drums and David Bennett Cohen on Hammond organ, piano and guitar—also played on the recordings.

The album also featured David Getz and Peter Albin from Big Brother & The Holding Company on drums and bass and Jack Cassady from Jefferson Airplane on bass. The remaining instruments were played by Mark Ryan and President Flyer. For the first time ever, some titles were accompanied by string and brass, which gave the album a somewhat poppier character. The tracks "I'll Survive" and "Maria" were recorded at Vanguard Studios in 23rd Street, New York. The remaining compositions were recorded at Pacific High Studios in San Francisco.

A single from the album, "Here I Go Again"/"Baby, You're Driving Me Crazy", was released, but did not place in the charts.

Album artwork was done by poster artist Tom Weller, who also did artwork for John Fahey and Jefferson Airplane.

== "Here I Go Again" ==
The song "Here I Go Again" was covered in 1976 by the model, actress and singer Twiggy. It reached #17 on the UK charts as the first single off her self-titled debut album.

== Track listing ==
All tracks composed by Country Joe McDonald, except where indicated.

Side one

1. "Here I Go Again" – 3:24
2. "Donovan‘s Reef" – 4:18
3. "It‘s So Nice to Have Love" – 3:25
4. "Baby, You’re Driving Me Crazy" – (Barry Melton) – 2:43
5. "Crystal Blues" – 6:18

Side two

6. "For No Reason" – 3:55
7. "I’ll Survive" – 2:28
8. "Maria" – 3:30
9. "My Girl" – (Melton) – 2:16
10. "Doctor of Electricity" – (Melton) – 3:58

== Personnel ==
Country Joe and the Fish

- Country Joe McDonald – lead vocals (tracks 1–3, 5–8); harmony vocals (track 4), guitars
- Barry "The Fish" Melton – electric guitar (tracks 1–6, 9, 10), electric slide guitar (tracks 7, 8), backing vocals (tracks 1–3, 5, 6, 8), lead vocals (tracks 4, 9, 10)
- David Cohen – keyboards (tracks 1–5, 8–10)
- Gary "Chicken" Hirsh – drums, percussion (all tracks)

Additional personnel

- Mark Ryan – bass (tracks 1, 2, 6)
- Jack Casady – bass (tracks 3–5, 9, 10)
- Peter Albin – bass (tracks 7, 8)
- Mark Kapner – piano (tracks 7, 8)
- David Getz - drums (tracks 7, 8)
