= Together (Country Joe and the Fish album) =

Studio album by Country Joe and the Fish
- Released: July 1968
- Recorded: November 1967
- Studio: Sierra Sound Laboratories, Berkeley, California and February 1968 Vanguard Studios, 71 West 23rd Street, New York City, NY
- Genre: Psychedelic rock; folk rock
- Length: 34:31
- Label: Vanguard VSD-79277
- Producer: Samuel Charters

Country Joe and the Fish chronology
I-Feel-Like-I'm-Fixin'-to-Die (1967)	Together (1968)	Here We Are Again (1969)

Professional ratings
Review scores
Source	Rating
AllMusic	4.5/5 stars
The Encyclopedia of Popular Music	2/5 stars
MusicHound Rock: The Essential Album Guide	2.5/5 stars
The Rolling Stone Album Guide	1/5 stars

Together is the third album by the American psychedelic rock band Country Joe and the Fish, released in 1968. Country Joe McDonald had briefly left the band prior to the recording sessions. All of the band members contributed to the songwriting. Together is the band's most commercially successful album.

The original lineup of the band broke up after the release of Together.

== Critical reception ==
AllMusic wrote that "McDonald tended to favor droning mantras like the album-closing 'An Untitled Protest', which worked better when contrasted with the likes of Melton's catchy anti-New York diatribe, 'The Streets of Your Town', and the group-written 'Rock and Soul Music'."

== Track listing ==
1. "Rock and Soul Music" (McDonald, Melton, Cohen, Barthol, Hirsh) – 6:51
2. "Susan" (Hirsh) – 3:28
3. "Mojo Navigator" (Denson, Melton, McDonald) – 2:23
4. "Bright Suburban Mr. & Mrs. Clean Machine" (Hirsh, Melton) – 2:19
5. "Good Guys/Bad Guys Cheer / The Streets of Your Town" (Melton) – 3:43
6. "The Fish Moan" – 0:27
7. "The Harlem Song" (McDonald) – 4:19
8. "Waltzing in the Moonlight" (Hirsh, Melton) – 2:13
9. "Away Bounce My Bubbles" (Hirsh) – 2:25
10. "Cetacean" (Barthol) – 3:38
11. "An Untitled Protest" (McDonald) – 2:45

== Personnel ==
Country Joe and the Fish

- Country Joe McDonald – lead vocals (tracks 1, 7–11), rap (track 7), acoustic 12-string guitar (track 7), electric 12-string guitar (tracks 9, 10), noises (track 10)
- Barry Melton – lead guitar (tracks 1, 5, 10), lead vocals (tracks 1, 3, 4, 5, 7), rhythm guitar (tracks 2, 3, 8), acoustic guitar (track 4), noises (track 10)
- David Cohen – organ (tracks 1–5, 9, 10), rhythm guitar (track 1), lead guitar (tracks 2, 3, 7, 8), piano (track 4), backing vocals (track 4), spoken word (track 7), bells (track 9), harpsichord (track 10), noises (track 10)
- Bruce Barthol – bass (tracks 1–3, 5, 7–10), backing vocals (tracks 4, 7), acoustic guitar (track 10), organ (track 11), noises (track 10)
- Gary "Chicken" Hirsh – drums (tracks 1–3, 5, 8, 10), lead vocals (tracks 2, 9, 10), backing vocals (tracks 4, 7), percussion (track 4), bells (track 5), sand blocks (track 7), harmony vocals (track 8), castanets (track 8), noises (track 10), music box (track 10)

Additional personnel

- Robin McDonald – finger cymbals (track 11)

== Chart positions ==
Billboard 200 – No. 23
