= CJ Fish =

Studio album by Country Joe and the Fish
- Released: April 1970
- Recorded: January 1970
- Studio: Record Plant, Los Angeles, CA
- Genre: Psychedelic rock
- Length: 39:49
- Label: Vanguard
- Producer: Tom Wilson

Country Joe and the Fish chronology
Here We Are Again (1969)	CJ Fish (1970)	The Life and Times of Country Joe and the Fish (1971)

Professional ratings
Review scores
Source	Rating
AllMusic	3/5 stars

CJ Fish is the fifth album by the San Francisco psychedelic rock group Country Joe and the Fish, released in April 1970 on the Vanguard label. It would be the band's first production with Tom Wilson and Country Joe & the Fish's last studio album for Vanguard Records. Recording took place at the Record Plant in Los Angeles, California.

After extensive touring with a new lineup, including Big Brother and the Holding Company guitarist Peter Albin, the makeshift group returned to the recording studio. Country Joe McDonald had already begun producing and recording solo albums for the label at that point.

As for the band, Country Joe and the Fish underwent a personnel change for this album adding drummer Greg Dewey, bassist Doug Metzner, and keyboardist Mark Kapner in place of David Cohen and Gary "Chicken" Hirsh. Primary composers Barry "The Fish" Melton and "Country Joe" McDonald remained, resulting in an album that retained the sound and style of the original lineup. The new lineup would tour extensively around the time the Woodstock film was released and the group was also included in the film Zachariah: The First Electric Western as a band of outlaws known as "The Crackers".

After experimenting on the previous album Here We Are Again (1969), the band reverted to their earlier sound that originated from their first two albums for the CJ Fish album. Although the album is psychedelic in nature, it is noted to be pop-orientated. Vanguard Records attempted to make the band more mainstream and this was the closest result that the group could produce as it is still very much underground. Track themes were still centered on the subjects of love and life as commonly done by the band. Despite the success of their tour, respectable album charting, and movie feature, the band would disband in the following year.

== Track listing ==
All tracks composed by Country Joe McDonald; except where indicated

Side one

1. "Sing Sing Sing" (Barry Melton) – 3:01
2. "She's a Bird" – 4:33
3. "Mara" – 2:57
4. "Hang On" – 4:08
5. "The Baby Song" – 2:50
6. "Hey Bobby" – 2:06

Side two

1. "Silver and Gold" – 2:47
2. "Rockin' Round the World" – 4:54
3. "The Love Machine" (Melton) – 5:48
4. "The Return of Sweet Lorraine" – 3:46
5. "Hand of Man" – 2:50
- Original Vinyl release: Vanguard VSD.6555 [May 1970]
- Original CD release: Vanguard 6555-2 [May 10, 1994]

== Personnel ==
- Joe McDonald – vocals, guitar
- Barry Melton – vocals, guitar
- Greg Dewey – drums
- Doug Metzner – bass guitar
- Mark Kapner – keyboard
- Peter Albin – guitar

Technical

- Producer: Tom Wilson
- Art direction: Jules Halfant
- Cover art: David Edward Byrd
- Back liner photo: Jules Kliot

== Charts ==
Chart (1970)	Peak position
Australia (Kent Music Report)	34
US Top LPs (Billboard)	111

== Releases ==
- CD CJ Fish Vanguard 1994
- Cassette CJ Fish Vanguard 1994
- CD CJ Fish Vanguard 1994
- CD C.J. & The Fish Vanguard 1998
- CD CJ Fish Ace 1998
- Digi CJ Fish Vanguard
