= I-Feel-Like-I'm-Fixin'-to-Die =

Studio album by Country Joe and the Fish
- Released: November 1967
- Recorded: July and August 1967
- Studios: Vanguard, New York City
- Genre: Psychedelic rock
- Length: 44:56
- Label: Vanguard VSD 79266
- Producer: Samuel Charters

Country Joe and the Fish chronology
Electric Music for the Mind and Body (1967)	I-Feel-Like-I'm-Fixin'-to-Die (1967)	Together (1968)

I-Feel-Like-I'm-Fixin'-to-Die is the second studio album by the American psychedelic rock band Country Joe and the Fish, released in November 1967, six months after the band's debut album, Electric Music for the Mind and Body. It is another prime example of the band's experimentation which features organ-heavy psychedelia and Eastern melodic lines, with more acoustic guitar than the debut. During this time, the band continued to build on their growing reputation by performing at local venues like the Fillmore Auditorium and appearing at festivals including Monterey Pop and The Fantasy Faire.

The album demonstrates the band using satirical humor to express their outspoken views toward the Vietnam War and other topics of the counterculture. Although many of the tracks were not as well-known, they were still accessible and showcased Country Joe McDonald as a lead vocalist. With the creativity of the band reaching a peak, the band began touring nationally and internationally.

== Songs and recording ==
Recordings took place in Vanguard studios in 71 West 23rd Street, New York City, during July and August 1967 with the exception of "Thought Dream" which was an outtake from the February 1967 sessions for Electric Music for the Mind and Body. With more money to spend than the debut, songs often went through several different arrangements and many overdubs before their final versions were chosen.

Three songs—the title track, "Who Am I?" and "Thought Dream"—were all written and performed before the debut album. The title track remains one of the most popular Vietnam protest songs from the 1960s, having originally appeared in folky acoustic form on their October 1965 EP Songs of Opposition on Rag Baby Records. It was originally considered for the debut album but held over by producer Samuel Charters on account of its controversial lyric. On the album, "I-Feel-Like-I'm-Fixin'-to-Die Rag" appears following "The Fish Cheer", which at concerts became a Country Joe standard. At Woodstock, Joe had the crowd yell F-U-C-K instead of F-I-S-H. "Who Am I?" had also been recorded for the initial Rag Baby EP but left off. Another of the more well-known numbers is the charming waltz-time track "Janis", which opens side two and was written for McDonald's then-girlfriend Janis Joplin. It is one of a number of songs written for female musicians included on their albums, others being "Grace" on the debut in honor of Grace Slick as well as "Pat's Song" for Pat Sullivan and "Colors For Susan" for flautist Susan Graubard of Pat Kilroy's group The New Age. "Magoo" was named after a local Hell's Angel's leader.

Other songs on the album include the closing instrumentals "Eastern Jam", which features raga-inflected fuzz guitar work from Barry Melton and "Colors for Susan", a slow, meditative acoustic guitar piece which conjures a similar mood to the quiet parts of "Section 43." "Colors For Susan" had evolved out of a long talk between Joe and producer Samuel Charters over the emotions the latter felt after hearing Erik Satie's "Les Sonneries de la Rose-Croix" in a still New York garden at sunset. In addition, two short interlude pieces, "The H-Bomb Song" and "The Acid Commercial", appear back-to-back in-between "Thought Dream" and "Thursday." Both pieces were often performed during the band's live shows as comic relief.

The group had been staying at the Chelsea Hotel in New York under brutal summer heat, recording during the day at Vanguard Studios located in the same building, while playing a two-week residency at the Cafe Au Go Go at night. After playing additional shows on the East Coast and Hawaii, the band was exhausted. At one point during the sessions Joe became so exhausted that the band recorded the backing track for "Janis" without him, leaving him to take a nap and add overdubs when awake. The result of the stress was that by the end of September, Country Joe had departed the band. Barry “The Fish” Melton, David Cohen, Bruce Barthol and Chicken Hirsch decided to continue as a four piece and renamed themselves The Incredible Fish. During this time Joe made his way up the coast playing Portland, Seattle and Vancouver whilst the band stayed largely in the Bay Area working theaters and some smaller venues. With the imminent release of the album, manager Ed Denson persuaded the band to reunite, which they did in time for both the album release in November and the airing of the KQED short film of A Day In The Life of Country Joe and The Fish that December.

== Album cover ==
The front cover photograph was taken by Joel Brodsky at a New York studio where many costumes were lying around, which the band decided to wear. David was a wizard, Joe was a soldier and Barry chose a Nazi uniform, although the swastika on his armband was later replaced by Vanguard with an American flag.

The original album sleeve contained a poster for "The Fish Game", a huge 22 x 33-inch fold-out board game sheet for throwing a dice and moving five three dimensional paper cut-outs of the band members around. Various goals are available for the game such as "scoring a joint".

== Release and reception ==
Professional ratings
Review scores
Source	Rating
AllMusic	4.5/5 stars

The album was released in November 1967 and eventually peaked at No. 67 on Billboard in early 1968. Two singles were released in the wake of the album, neither of which charted. These include "Janis"/"Janis (instrumental)" and "Who Am I"/"Thursday".

The original Rolling Stone review was favorable, as was its entry in the 1979 edition of The Rolling Stone Record Guide, where it was given four stars and deemed a worthy successor to the debut which demonstrated the group's maturation. By contrast, the original Billboard review declared it "isn't up to the group's par", while Richie Unterburger at AllMusic called it an inferior period piece compared to its predecessor but noted that besides containing the classic title track, "Who Am I?" and "Thursday" were touching psychedelic ballads.

The title song faced a legal challenge from the estate of New Orleans jazz trombone pioneer Edward "Kid" Ory, whose daughter Babette claimed that McDonald had appropriated the melody for his song from Ory's classic "Muskrat Ramble" as recorded by Louis Armstrong & his Hot Five in 1926. A 2005 judgment upheld McDonald's copyright on the song, claiming that Ory had waited too long to make the claim.

The 2013 digi-pack double disc set includes both stereo and mono versions of the album, the latter available for the first time since 1967. Bonus cuts include an unreleased alternate mix of the title track (minus sound effects) and an instrumental version of "Janis" (the original flip side to the single of the same name), both on the mono disc, and a deluxe 40-page booklet stuffed with rare photos and memorabilia. It also comes complete with a replica of The Fish Game, as included in original LPs.

In 2017 Vanguard authorized the release of a quadruple vinyl box set with copies of the first two albums in both stereo and mono, with the mono version of the first album featuring the original rejected sleeve.

== Track listing ==
All songs by Country Joe McDonald, except where noted. "Janis" is the first song on side two of the original LP.

1. "The "Fish" Cheer/I-Feel-Like-I'm-Fixin'-to-Die Rag" – 3:44
2. "Who Am I" – 4:05
3. "Pat's Song" – 5:26
4. "Rock Coast Blues" – 3:57
5. "Magoo" – 4:44
6. "Janis" – 2:36
7. "Thought Dream" – 6:39
8. "Thursday" (Cohen, Hirsh) – 3:20
9. "Eastern Jam" (Barthol, Cohen, Hirsh, Melton) – 4:27
10. "Colors for Susan" – 5:58

The 2013 digi pack double disc set includes two bonus cuts added to the mono disc.

11. "Janis" (Instrumental) – 2:37
12. "I Feel Like I'm Fixin' to Die" (Alternative Mix) – 3:02

== Personnel ==
Country Joe and the Fish

- Country Joe McDonald – vocals (tracks 1–8), acoustic guitar (tracks 2, 5, 6, 10), rhythm guitar (tracks 3, 7), organ (track 8)
- Barry Melton – 12-string guitar (track 1), vocals (tracks 1, 5), kazoo (track 1), rhythm guitar (tracks 2, 4, 5), lead guitar (tracks 3, 4, 6–9)
- David Cohen – calliope (tracks 1, 6), vocals (track 1), lead guitar (tracks 2, 5, 9, 10), organ (tracks 3, 7), bells (track 3), rhythm guitar (track 4), harpsichord (track 6), acoustic guitar (track 8)
- Bruce Barthol – bass; vocals (track 1), barking (track 1), harmonica (track 6)
- Gary "Chicken" Hirsh – drums; wine bottle (track 1), congas (track 9), bells (track 10)
