= Country blues =

Music genre

- Other names: Folk blues; rural blues; backwoods blues; downhome blues
- Stylistic origins: Blues; folk; gospel
- Cultural origins: Early 20th century, American South

Subgenres
- Delta blues; Piedmont blues; Hill country blues

Country blues (also folk blues, rural blues, backwoods blues, or downhome blues) is one of the earliest forms of blues music, but also refers to a blend of country music and blues. The mainly solo vocal with acoustic fingerstyle guitar accompaniment developed in the rural Southern United States in the early 20th century. It stands in contrast primarily to the urban blues style, especially in the pre-war era.

== History ==
Artists such as Blind Lemon Jefferson (Texas), Charley Patton (Mississippi), Blind Willie McTell (Georgia) were among the first to record blues songs in the 1920s. Country blues ran parallel to urban blues, which was popular in cities.

Historian Elijah Wald notes many similarities between blues, bluegrass, and country & western styles with roots in the American south. Record labels in the 1920s and 1930s carefully segregated musicians and defined styles for racially targeted audiences. Over time, the rural black and rural white music evolved into different styles, with artists such as Bobby Bland, Ray Charles, and Willie Nelson lamenting the divide.

Folklorist Alan Lomax was one of the first to use the term and applied it to a field recording he made of Muddy Waters at the Stovall Plantation, Mississippi, in 1941. In 1959, music historian Samuel Charters wrote The Country Blues, an influential scholarly work on the subject. He also produced an album, also titled The Country Blues, with early recordings by Jefferson, McTell, Sleepy John Estes, Bukka White, and Robert Johnson.

Charters's works helped to introduce the then-nearly forgotten music to the American folk music revival of the late 1950s and 1960s. The acoustic roots-focused movement also gave rise to the terms "folk blues" and "acoustic blues", especially being applied to performances and recordings made around this period. "Country blues" has also been used to describe regional acoustic styles, such as Delta blues, Piedmont blues, Hill country blues or the earliest Chicago, Texas, and Memphis blues.

== See also ==
- List of country blues musicians
