= Not So Sweet Martha Lorraine =

1967 single by Country Joe and the Fish

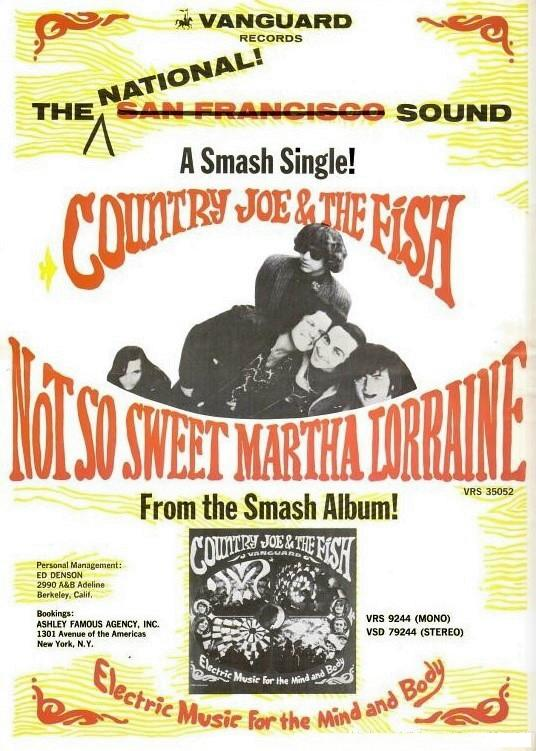

Single by Country Joe and the Fish

from the album Electric Music for the Mind and Body
- B-side: "Masked Marauder"
- Released: April 1967
- Recorded: February 1967
- Genre: Acid rock; psychedelic rock
- Length: 4:24
- Label: Vanguard
- Songwriter: Joseph McDonald
- Producer: Samuel Charters

Country Joe and the Fish singles chronology
"Not So Sweet Martha Lorraine" (1967)	"Janis" (1967)

"Not So Sweet Martha Lorraine" is the debut single by American psychedelic rock band Country Joe and the Fish, released in April 1967 as the lead single from their debut studio album Electric Music for the Mind and Body (1967). It is their highest-charting song, peaking at number 98 on the Billboard Hot 100.

== Composition ==
The song is based on blues and composed of organ, guitar, drums and bass, with the drums featuring alternating tempos. Lyrically, it is a love song centering on a failed romance.

== Critical reception ==
Uncut considered Country Joe McDonald's "wry, wide-eyed vocal approach" on "Not So Sweet Martha Lorraine" to be "even better" compared to their song "Flying High". They additionally stated, "A character sketch of sorts, a romance gone awry, it leaves boy/girl, moon/spoon pop fare in the dust, its unconventional rhythms and surreal storytelling making it the album’s most compelling track."

== Charts ==
Chart (1967)	Peak position
US Billboard Hot 100	98
