= The Jabberwock (club) =

Folk club in Berkeley, California

Coordinates: 37.85753°N 122.25925°W

The Jabberwock was an American folk music club and coffeehouse active from 1961 to 1967, and located in Berkeley, California. It became among the most popular venues in the area's folk movement thanks to Bill "Jolly Blue" Ehlert. It stood at the corner of Telegraph Avenue and Russell Street, and featured several notable artists. The club was particularly frequented by pre-groups formed by future members of Country Joe and the Fish. The building was demolished two years after the business's closing.

== History ==
The Jabberwock was previously a jazz club called the Tsubo. The Tsubo had been opened by entrepreneur Glenn Ross in September 1961 with the Berkeley jazz radio station, KJAZ-FM, also housed in the same building. As a jazz club, the venue is best-remembered for being where guitarist Wes Montgomery recorded his live album Full House on June 25, 1962. Although the establishment was favored among Berkeley residents for not serving alcohol and welcoming minors, Ross could not sustain upkeep on the establishment. It finally closed on October 15, 1962, with Ross having invested $35,000 into Tsubo and consequently emerging in debt. Shortly thereafter, the name of the building was changed to the Jabberwock.

In 1963, the Jabberwock transitioned into catering for enthusiasts of the folk movement under the leadership of new owners Belle Randell and her husband John Stauber, a classically-trained guitarist and accompanist. The Jabberwock was less than a mile from UC Berkeley, and accommodated a young fan base of students and graduates, especially when the university became ground zero for anti-war sentiment and the Free Speech Movement in 1964. Poster artist Tom Waller described the club as a "beatnik sort of place at that point, walls all painted black and espresso and cool jazz. The club also featured some classical music, including a recorder trio consisting of Michael Rossman (of FSM fame), Stewart Kiritz, and Phil Nathanson), who played for free meals and passed a hat around for funds. A few years later it became part of the folk scene and then the hippie scene". The venue was open on a daily basis and during Randell and Stauber's tenure of ownership it featured future Joy of Cooking guitarist Terry Garthwaite, Bob Dylan, Jesse Fuller, Bukka White, Ian and Sylvia, Robbie Basho, and Perry Lederman, among others.

On March 23, 1965, Randell and Stauber sold the Jabberwock to Bill "Jolly Blue" Ehlert. Around this time, it was regularly the venue for performances by future Country Joe and the Fish members Country Joe McDonald and Barry "The Fish" Melton in the Instant Jug Band and Bruce Barthol. Following Country Joe and the Fish's success with Electric Music for the Mind and Body, the group still returned to the Jabberwock, but with an emphasis on psychedelia. The Jabberwock reached the peak of its popularity in 1966 as many musical artists began converting to psychedelic music, the club still hosted folk musicians. In the same year, Ehlert hired Jesse Cahn, who had been a guest drummer for the Chambers Brothers, to co-manage the Jabberwock while he ran the Matrix in San Francisco.

After several unsuccessful co-management partners, Sally Henderson took the helm for the club's final few months. In 1967, Health and Building Departments reclassified the building as hazardous due to an increased occupancy load. A complete renovation was required that was not financially viable, forcing the Jabberwock to close on July 7, 1967. Two years after its closure, the Jabberwock was demolished. A garden was grown on the vacant lot where the building had stood.
