= David Bennett Cohen =

American musician (born 1942)

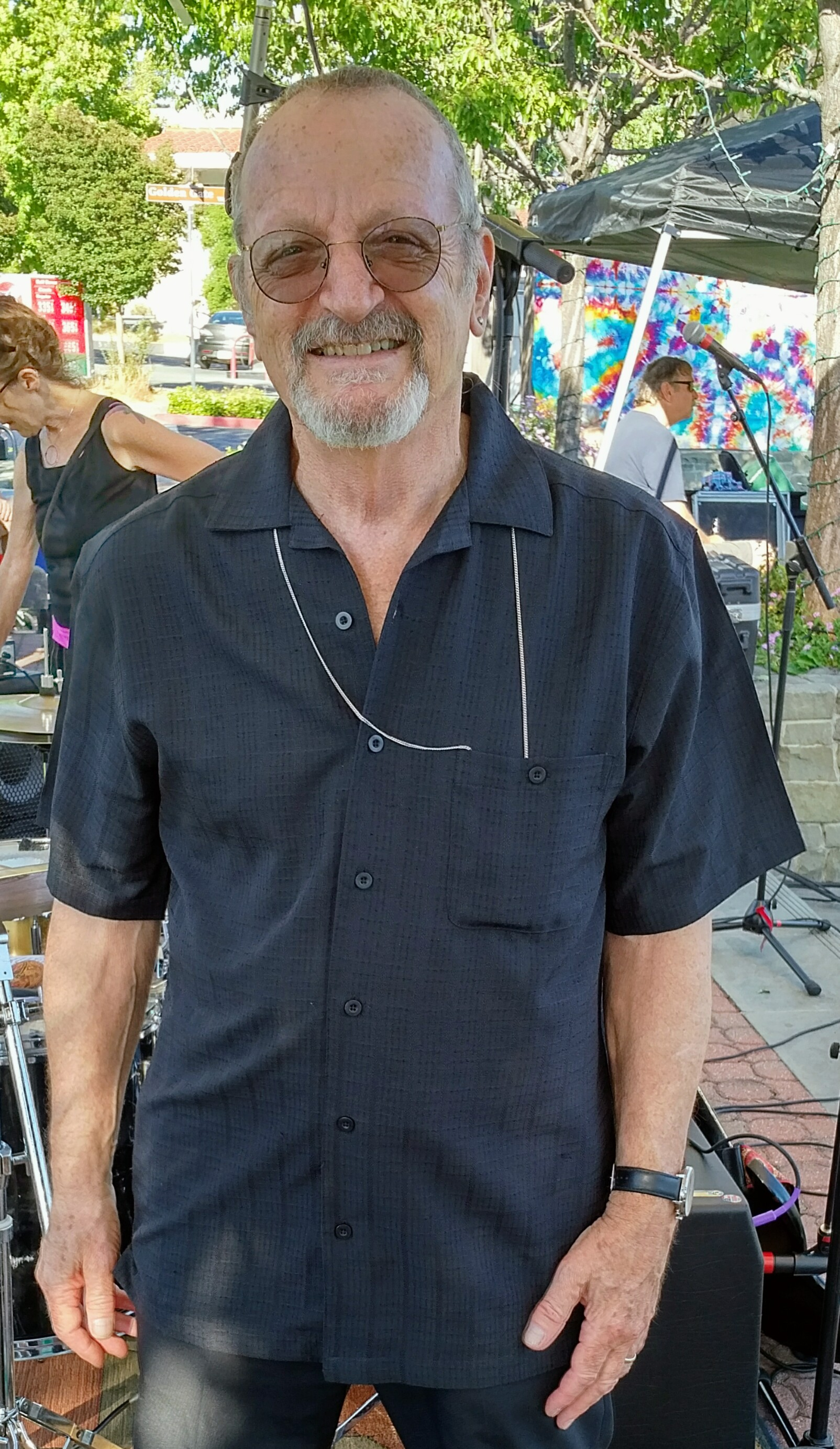
- Cohen at Summer of Love, Lafayette, California in 2017

Background information
- Born: David Bennett Cohen; August 4, 1942 (age 84); Brooklyn, New York, U.S.
- Genres: Blues; folk; psychedelic rock; rock; ragtime; boogie-woogie
- Occupation: Musician
- Instruments: Guitar; piano; electronic organ
- Years active: c. 1959–present
- Website: Official website

David Bennett Cohen (born August 4, 1942) is an American musician best known as the original keyboardist and one of the guitar players for the late-1960s psychedelic rock and blues band Country Joe and the Fish.

== Early life and influences ==
Cohen was born in Brooklyn, New York. He studied classical piano from the age of seven, and later learned to play guitar. When he was fourteen, he heard boogie-woogie piano for the first time, and from then on, his playing was influenced by boogie-woogie, as well as piano blues. When he was young he attended live performances of Otis Spann, Professor Longhair, Meade Lux Lewis, Pete Seeger, Joshua Rifkin and Josh White, among others. In April 1961, he was one of the musicians involved in the "Beatnik Riot" in Washington Square Park, protesting against the authorities' refusal to allow musicians permits to play in the park. As a guitarist, who performed regularly in Greenwich Village, he started a folk group, the Lane County Bachelors, with Artie Traum and Eric Nagler.

== Country Joe and the Fish ==
In 1965, soon after discovering the Beatles and turning to rock music, he dropped out of college and moved to Berkeley, California, where he met musicians including Chicken Hirsh and Jerry Garcia. He and Hirsh backed the duo Blackburn & Snow, and Cohen also played boogie-woogie piano in a club, the Jabberwock. There he met guitarist Barry Melton, and was introduced to Country Joe McDonald as a pianist and organist – although, at the time, Cohen had never played organ. He joined McDonald's new band, Country Joe and the Fish, with Melton, Bruce Barthol, Paul Armstrong and John Francis Gunning later saying:

The band bought me a Farfisa organ and I started playing that. Of course, I had no idea of what to do with it, so I started to steal my own guitar licks. I would get these reviews saying what a unique style I had. The reality was that I had no idea what I was doing. Of course, eventually I did learn to play it.

He was a member of Country Joe and the Fish from December 1965 to January 1969, and played on their first two albums, Electric Music for the Mind and Body and I-Feel-Like-I'm-Fixin'-to-Die, as well as several tracks on their third album, Together. Record producer Sam Charters regarded him as "musically more experienced" than the other band members.

== Later career ==
After leaving Country Joe and the Fish, Cohen moved to England before returning to the United States to join the Blues Project in New York in 1971, touring with the band until mid 1972. He has played with many musicians including Janis Joplin, Luther Tucker, Mick Taylor, Tim Hardin, Jimi Hendrix, Johnny Winter, Huey Lewis, Michael Bloomfield and Bob Weir. He also worked as a solo musician, sharing bills with Bonnie Raitt, Richard Thompson, Jerry Garcia, Leo Kottke, Rufus Thomas and others.

In 1975, Happy Traum invited Cohen to record instructional lessons on piano for his Homespun Tapes series. Subsequently, he recorded three videotapes on blues piano, audio tapes on blues, rock and ragtime piano, and a separate instructional package on blues piano, David Bennett Cohen Teaches Blues Piano, Volumes I and II. He also recorded two guitar instruction albums for Kicking Mule Records.

During the 1990s, he toured with the musical Rent, playing guitar and keyboards. He also recorded with the Bill Perry Blues Band, and toured as part of blues musician Bobby Kyle's band. He released three albums in the 2000s, David Bennett Cohen at the Piano, In the Pocket, and Cookin' With Cohen.

He continues to perform in the New York City area, both solo and with the Former Members, a band whose members include Bruce Barthol (also formerly of Country Joe and the Fish), Roy Blumenfeld (of the Blues Project) and Greg Douglass (of the Steve Miller Band).

The summer of 2014 saw Cohen tour the UK with San Francisco Nights, including the other Former Members, Sam Andrew (of Big Brother and the Holding Company) and Bex Marshall (as the voice of Janis Joplin).

Cohen is also a music instructor, and runs workshops.

== Discography ==
With Eddie "Cleanhead" Vinson

- The Original Cleanhead (BluesTime, 1970)
