= Electric Music for the Mind and Body =

Studio album by Country Joe and the Fish
- Released: May 11, 1967
- Recorded: February 1967
- Studios: Sierra Sound Laboratories, Berkeley, California by Robert DeSouza
- Genres: Acid rock; psychedelic rock
- Length: 43:30
- Label: Vanguard VSD-79244
- Producer: Samuel Charters

Country Joe and the Fish chronology
Electric Music for the Mind and Body (1967)	I-Feel-Like-I'm-Fixin'-to-Die (1967)

Electric Music for the Mind and Body is the debut album by the American psychedelic rock band Country Joe and the Fish. Released in May 1967 on the Vanguard label, it was one of the first psychedelic albums to come out of the San Francisco Bay Area.

Tracks from the LP, especially "Section 43", "Grace", and "Not So Sweet Martha Lorraine", were played on progressive FM rock stations like KSAN and KMPX in San Francisco, often back-to-back. A version of the song "Love" was performed at the 1969 Woodstock Festival.

== Background ==
Country Joe and the Fish were originally formed in 1965 by Country Joe McDonald and Barry Melton as an acoustic folk/jugband duo. This embryonic version of the group, supplemented by Carl Shrager, Bill Steele and Mike Beardslee, recorded an initial EP in September of that year which was released as a "talking issue" of Rag Baby magazine a month later. The EP featured early versions of "I-Feel-Like-I'm-Fixin-to-Die Rag" and "Superbird", both of which would be re-recorded for the first two albums, along with two Peter King tracks. By January 1966 the group had expanded into a semi-electric six-piece, with the transition to a fully electric rock band happening after several members attended a Paul Butterfield Blues Band and Jefferson Airplane show at UC Berkeley on April 16. On June 6, this version of the group cut a self-titled second EP at Berkeley's Sierra Sound Laboratories; released that July, it featured three songs ("Section 43", "Thing Called Love", and "Bass Strings"), all of which would be re-recorded for the debut album. The EP was pressed four times and proved very popular, which resulted in record company attention; in early November 1966 the group were set to record a third EP when they were discovered and signed to Vanguard records by producer Samuel Charters.

== Songs and recording ==
In late November 1966 the group began trial recordings for the album at Sierra Sound Laboratories, but clashes between Joe and drummer John Francis Gunning led to the latter's abrupt firing. His replacement, Gary "Chicken" Hirsh, joined the group in time for an extended period of rehearsals at The Barn in the Santa Cruz Mountains in the weeks before Christmas 1966, where the new lineup gelled.

Recording sessions for the album proper took place on four-track machines during the first week of February 1967 at Sierra Sound, produced by Charters. The instrumental backings to the songs were largely played live in the studio, with Joe's later vocal overdubs recorded with the lights out due to his self-consciousness at having the others look at him while singing.

The first songs recorded on February 1 were "Not So Sweet Martha Lorraine", chosen as the lead single that April, and "Bass Strings", which had originally appeared on the second EP. According to Joe, the subject of "Lorraine" was a compendium of several different women although he professed to not particularly like the song, and wondered how it became popular. The group were nervous to sing "Bass Strings" as the lyrics admitted they all smoked marijuana, which was a felony at the time. In the song Joe urges his pals to "pass that reefer round," and at the end of the track Joe can be heard whispering the letters "L-S-D".

On February 2, "Porpoise Mouth" (known as "Happiness Is A Porpoise Mouth" on the stereo pressing) and "The Masked Marauder" were committed to tape. Of the former, Joe stated "It was shocking to write about an erection, and I couldn't believe that I'd actually done that and sung it. The song was clever in the way that it shifts from 3/4 to 6/8." "The Masked Marauder" is a multi-sectional instrumental which was the newest thing written for the album, developed during the December 1966 Barn rehearsals. The next day, "Death Sound" (known as "Death Sound Blues" on the stereo pressing), "Love" and "Grace" were tackled. "Death Sound" was one of the earliest songs penned, an acid-blues number with dark themes of death. "Love" had been another early song written by the whole band and recorded for the self-titled second EP as "Thing Called Love", although it appears here in a faster rearrangement with a soul backbeat and lead vocal by Melton. "Grace" was Joe's ode to Grace Slick, the lead singer of Jefferson Airplane.Joe had met her while she was in her earlier band, the Great Society, and wanted to give her better material to sing. The song was influenced by Japanese music and employed a number of sonic additions including bells, chimes, water sound effects, and increasing echo delay, getting slower as it progresses.

February 4 was given to re-takes and overdubs to "Lorraine", "Masked Marauder", "Bass Strings", and "Porpoise Mouth". On February 6 the group reconvened to cut the album opener "Flying High" and lengthy side one closer "Section 43". "Flying High" was based on a real-life incident where Joe was stuck hitchhiking in the rain in Los Angeles, ignored by all the "straight" cars until finally picked up by two fellow hippies. "Section 43" was another track that had appeared on the second EP, originally begun by Joe on an acoustic guitar and harmonica with more sections added in as it developed, with influences ranging from guitarist John Fahey to classical pieces like "In the Hall of the Mountain King". The final recording was edited together from three sections titled "A", "B", and "ragtime", with Charters fading each one out to complete silence. The last day of recording, on the 7th, saw "Superbird" and "Sad and Lonely Times" completed. "Superbird" was a protest number taking aim at President Johnson that had initially appeared on the first EP from October 1965, transformed from an acoustic jugband number to a soul-infused rocker with added lyrics that promised the commander-in-chief would be made to "eat flowers" and "drop acid". "Sad And Lonely Times" was an older song with Melton taking lead vocal, although members of the band have since identified it as their least favorite on the album due to its simple C&W arrangement.

Two other songs were considered for the album: "Thought Dream", recorded on February 2, was held over for the sophomore effort I-Feel-Like-I'm-Fixin'-to-Die, while the "I-Feel- Like-I'm-Fixin'-to-Die Rag" itself (another song that had appeared on the first Rag Baby EP) was considered too controversial to record by Charters and held over until after it was seen how the similar protest number "Superbird" fared with radio.

When the sessions were finished, Charters took the tapes to Vanguard Studios in New York to edit and mix the album. He tried several different running orders but eventually settled on having each side begin with the more "out" or commercial songs and then gradually going further "in" to the most spiritual, psychedelic material.

== Release ==
"Not So Sweet Martha Lorraine" previewed the album that April and was the band's only entry on the singles chart, peaking at #95 on Billboard that August. The album was released on May 11, 1967, on the Vanguard label, with a release party thrown at the Fillmore on the same night. Sales were slow at first but the album eventually peaked at #39 in September, after the group's appearance that June at the Monterey International Pop Festival. Versions of "Not So Sweet Martha Lorraine" and "Section 43" were filmed, the latter appearing in the concert movie.

Due to deterioration of the original master tapes, the album was remixed in 1982 and this remix was used for the original CD release in 1990. In 2013 a new two-disc deluxe version appeared which included both the original mono and stereo mixes, marking the first time that producer Sam Charters’ original stereo mixdown had been issued on compact disc. Both stereo and mono versions of the album, with the mono housed in the original rejected sleeve design, were released on the Wave of Electrical Sound box set in 2018.

== Reception ==
Professional ratings
Review scores
Source	Rating
AllMusic	4.5/5 stars

The album was received warmly on release with the Berkeley Gazette noting that songs like "Bass Strings" and "Section 43" "employ echo chambers, distortion, and other electronic embellishments to augment the unique versatility of sound mixing the Fish compulsively indulge in...the mood is essentially psychedelic, with the texture of smoky colored glass."

In a retrospective review for AllMusic, Bruce Eder felt that the album is "one of the most important and enduring documents of the psychedelic era". Country Joe later boasted "If you want to understand psychedelic music, and you haven't heard Electric Music for the Mind and Body, then you probably don't know what you're talking about."

The album was included in Robert Dimery's 1001 Albums You Must Hear Before You Die.

Uncut called it a "game changer" and said, "It isn’t easy to pinpoint singular, watershed moments in a culture’s evolution – in fact, it’s a messy business, heroes and hucksters alike laying claims to history. But it is safe to say that when Electric Music For The Mind And Body arrived via Vanguard on May 11, 1967 – six weeks ahead of the fabled Summer Of Love – the pop landscape had seen nothing of its kind."

== Track listing ==
All songs by Country Joe McDonald, except where noted.

1. "Flying High" – 2:38
2. "Not So Sweet Martha Lorraine" – 4:21
3. "Death Sound Blues" – 4:23 ("Death Sound" on the mono version of the album)
4. "Happiness Is a Porpoise Mouth" – 2:48 ("Porpoise Mouth" on the mono version of the album)
5. "Section 43" – 7:23
6. "Superbird" – 2:04
7. "Sad and Lonely Times" – 2:23
8. "Love" (Joe McDonald, Barry Melton, David Cohen, Bruce Barthol, John Francis Gunning, Paul Armstrong) – 2:19
9. "Bass Strings" – 4:58
10. "The Masked Marauder" – 3:10
11. "Grace" – 7:03

== Personnel ==
Country Joe and the Fish

- Country Joe McDonald - lead vocals (tracks 1–4, 6, 9–11), rhythm guitar (tracks 2, 4, 7–9), tambourine (track 3), lead guitar (track 5), harmonica (track 5), backing vocals (track 7), bells (track 11)
- Barry Melton - lead guitar (tracks 1–5, 8–11), rhythm guitar (track 6), lead vocals (tracks 7, 8), bass (track 7)
- David Cohen - rhythm guitar (track 1), organ (tracks 2, 4, 5, 8–10), lead guitar (tracks 3, 6, 7, 11)
- Bruce Barthol - bass (all tracks except track 7), harmonica (tracks 7, 10)
- Gary "Chicken" Hirsh - drums; background noise (track 11)

Technical

- Jules Halfant - sleeve design
- John Bagley - front cover photographs
- Michael K. Wiese - back cover photograph
