= Strangeland =

Strangeland or Strange Land may refer to:

== Music ==
- Strangeland (album), a 2012 album by Keane
- Strange Land, a 1986 album by Box of Frogs
- Strangelands, a 1988 album by The Crazy World of Arthur Brown
- "Strangeland", a 1990 song by Green Day from Sweet Children
- "Strangeland", a 2002 song by Tristesse de la Lune
- "Strangeland", a 2011 song by Tech N9ne from All 6's and 7's

== Other ==
- Strangeland (film), a 1998 American horror film
- Strangeland (video game), a 2021 video game
- Strangeland (podcast), an investigative series
- Jim Stangeland (1921–2014), American football player and coach
- The Strange Land, a novel by Hammond Innes

== See also ==
- Stranger in a Strange Land (disambiguation)
