= The Country Blues =

Compilation album by various artists
- Released: 1959
- Recorded: 1920s–1940
- Genre: Country blues
- Length: 41:18
- Label: Folkways
- Producer: Samuel Charters

The Country Blues is a seminal album released on Folkways Records in 1959, catalogue RF 1. Compiled by Samuel Charters from 78-rpm recordings, it accompanied his book of the same name to provide examples of the music discussed. Both the book and the album were key documents in the American folk music revival of the 1950s and 1960s, and many of its songs would either be incorporated into new compositions by later musicians, or covered outright.

== Background ==
Recordings of the music known as country blues derived from the mid-1920s to the early 1930s, commencing after the proven commercial appeal of classic female blues and ending when the Great Depression greatly curtailed the market for the record industry. These recordings had all been collected on 78s, and with the exceptions of top-sellers like Lonnie Johnson and Blind Lemon Jefferson, pressings rarely exceeded approximately 5000 or so. At the time of the issue of this record, the catalogue of country blues music on long-playing album was fairly small. The jazz label Riverside Records and Folkways had made contemporary recordings of artists such as Sonny Terry, Brownie McGhee, Big Bill Broonzy, Reverend Gary Davis, and Lead Belly. Reissue compilations of 78s had also been undertaken by both Riverside and Folkways, but they were few, and indeed Charters complained in 1959 that companies owning various country blues masters were interfering with any attempts to bring the music back on the market. The most famous reissue, and the most easily accessible to the burgeoning Greenwich Village folk revivalists, was the Harry Smith anthology released in 1952.

== Content ==
Charters undertook this fourteen-song compilation to accompany his ground-breaking study also published as The Country Blues, both to illustrate the styles and artists referenced, and to bring back more of this music into circulation. Charters took care not to duplicate any recordings already found on the earlier Smith anthology.

The album includes selections from Leroy Carr, one of the best-selling blues artists of the 1930s, to Robert Johnson, who was virtually unknown through the 1950s. The recordings were taken from the collections of Pete Whalen, Pete Kaufman, Ben Kaplan, and Charters himself, with the Broonzy and Bukka White selections from the archives of Folkways Records and Moses Asch. Charters initially took the Robert Johnson track, "Preachin' Blues," as a different take from the one issued on Vocalion 4630, but it is in fact the only version, issued on both the King of the Delta Blues Singers album two years later and its 1970 sequel. "Preachin' Blues" is one of the two recordings John Hammond played at his Spirituals to Swing concert at Carnegie Hall in 1938 to represent the work of the recently deceased Johnson.

== Legacy ==
The publication of the companion book was a "signal event in the history of the music, a moment of recognition and legitimization." The album itself aided in the further dissemination of country blues music, following as almost a coda to the Smith anthology. It had its detractors, however, irritated at the presence of "commercial" artists like Carr and Jefferson, countering with an anthology of "pure" country blues artists, purity determined by lack of sales, entitled Really! The Country Blues.

Later artists recorded versions of songs from this album. Bob Dylan included "Fixin' to Die" on his debut album, and "Matchbox Blues" had been handed down through Billie Holiday and Carl Perkins to end up on the Long Tall Sally extended play single by The Beatles. The Grateful Dead recorded "Stealin', Stealin'" as their first single in 1966 on the small Scorpio Records label in San Francisco. "Key to the Highway" would appear on Eric Clapton's Layla and Other Assorted Love Songs, and "Statesboro Blues" would be a concert staple for the Allman Brothers, issued on their At Fillmore East live album. Both these last featured the guitar work of Duane Allman.

A cover of "Walk Right In" by the folk trio The Rooftop Singers would top the Billboard Hot 100 for two weeks in January 1963. "Careless Love" would be sung by Joan Baez and Janis Joplin, among others, although they could have been referencing the record by Bessie Smith rather than the Lonnie Johnson version here.

== Track listing ==
All songs written by the performer except where indicated.

=== Side one ===
No.	Title	Writer(s)	Performer	Length
1.	"Matchbox Blues"		Blind Lemon Jefferson	2:54
2.	"Careless Love"	W.C. Handy	Lonnie Johnson	2:58
3.	"Walk Right In"	Gus Cannon	Cannon's Jug Stompers	2:57
4.	"Low Down Rounder's Blues"		Peg Leg Howell	2:53
5.	"Statesboro Blues"		Blind Willie McTell	2:35
6.	"Stealin', Stealin'"	Will Shade, Charlie Burse	Memphis Jug Band	3:01
7.	"You Gonna Need Somebody on Your Bond"		Blind Willie Johnson	3:12

=== Side two ===
No.	Title	Writer(s)	Performer	Length
1.	"Alabama Woman Blues"		Leroy Carr	2:53
2.	"Special Agent"		Sleepy John Estes	2:53
3.	"Key to the Highway"	Charlie Segar, Big Bill Broonzy	Big Bill Broonzy	3:02
4.	"Fixin' to Die"		Bukka White	2:51
5.	"I'm A Guitar King"		Tommy McClennan	2:51
6.	"Preachin' Blues"		Robert Johnson	2:54
7.	"I Been Treated Wrong"		Washboard Sam	3:22
