= Stranger in a Strange Land (disambiguation) =

Stranger in a Strange Land is a 1961 science fiction novel by Robert A. Heinlein.

The phrase, which describes the birth of Moses' son Gershom, is from the Book of Exodus 2:22 (in the King James Version): "And she bare [him] a son, and he called his name Gershom: for he said, I have been a stranger in a strange land".

It also appears in Dracula by Bram Stoker: "Here I am noble; I am boyar; the common people know me, and I am master. But a stranger in a strange land, he is no one; men know him not—and to know not is to care not for."

Stranger in a Strange Land may also refer to:

== Music ==
- "Stranger in a Strange Land", by the Byrds from Turn! Turn! Turn!, originally 1965, 1996 re-issue
- "Stranger in a Strange Land", by Blackburn & Snow, recorded 1966, from Something Good for Your Head, 1999
- "Stranger in a Strange Land", by Leon Russell from Leon Russell and the Shelter People, 1971
- "Stranger in a Strange Land", by U2 from October, 1981
- "Stranger in a Strange Land", by Triumph from Thunder Seven, 1984
- "Stranger in a Strange Land", by Eddie Money from Can't Hold Back, 1986
- "Stranger in a Strange Land" (Iron Maiden song), 1986
- "Stranger in a Strange Land", by Ace Frehley from Frehley's Comet, 1987
- "Stranger in a Strange Land", by Spock's Beard from Snow, 2002
- "Stranger in a Strange Land" (Barbra Streisand song), 2005
- "Stranger in a Strange Land", by 30 Seconds to Mars from This Is War, 2009

== Television ==
- "Stranger in a Strange Land" (Lost), a 2007 episode of the television series Lost
- "Chapter 1: Stranger in a Strange Land", the series premiere of the television series The Book of Boba Fett
- "Stranger in a Strange Land", the final episode of season three of television series For All Mankind
