= The Country Blues (book) =

- First edition
- Author: Samuel Charters
- Language: English
- Genre: Ethnomusicology
- Publisher: Rinehart & Company
- Publication date: 1959
- Publication place: United States
- Media type: Print (Hardback and Paperback)
- Pages: 288 (reprint hardcover)

The Country Blues is a book on country blues music by Samuel Charters, published in 1959. It was the first full-length scholarly study of blues music to be published in the US. (Note: In the United Kingdom, it was preceded by Paul Oliver's Blues Fell This Morning.) At the time, very little research into the subject had been done, and recordings from the 1920s and 1930s were difficult to locate. It marked the beginning of the blues revival, bringing mainstream attention to older blues traditions and inspiring further research. Figures such as Gayle Dean Wardlow and Pete Whelan cited it as a motivating force for their own research.

The book focuses on early blues singers and their recordings, and particularly on artists that were popular with Black American audiences. In writing it, Charters drew on articles in Record Research magazine, recordings, and his own field research.

An album of the same name was issued on Folkways Records in 1959 as an accompaniment to provide examples of the artists and styles discussed. A follow up, The Country Blues Volume 2 was issued in 1965.

Charters's book barely mentioned the Mississippi Delta. In response, an album of tracks by Delta artists entitled Really! The Country Blues was put out Pete Whelan on his Origin Jazz Library label.

Charters also stressed the rural blues, as opposed to urban and electrified variants.

As well as omissions, contemporary critics noted a number of errors. The book was reprinted by Da Capo Press in 1975 with minor edits, and a new introduction by the author, in which he acknowledged that he had made errors, but said that the subject could not afford to wait.
