= Ann Charters =

Professor of American Literature

Ann Charters (née Ann Ruth Danberg; born November 10, 1936) is Professor Emerita of American Literature at the University of Connecticut at Storrs. She is a Jack Kerouac and Beat Generation scholar.

== Early life and career ==
Charters was born on November 10, 1936, in Bridgeport, Connecticut. She is a professor of American Literature at the University of Connecticut at Storrs and has been interested in Beat writers since 1956, when as an undergraduate English major at the University of California, Berkeley (B.A. 1957) she attended the repeat performance of the Six Gallery Poetry reading in San Francisco where Allen Ginsberg gave his second public reading of "Howl." She began collecting books written by Beat writers when she was a graduate student at Columbia University (M.A. 1960; Ph.D. 1965).

After completing her doctorate, she worked with Jack Kerouac to compile his bibliography. After his death she wrote the first Kerouac biography, Kerouac: A Biography (1973). Charters was denied access to Kerouac's archives and so she relied heavily upon his own fictionalized accounts of his life. She also edited his posthumous collection Scattered Poems and both volumes of his Selected Letters as a life-in-letters biography.

She has written a literary study of Charles Olson and biographies of black entertainer Bert Williams and (with her husband Samuel Charters, a musicologist) the Russian poet Vladimir Mayakovsky. She was the general editor of the two volume encyclopedia The Beats: Literary Bohemians in Postwar America. She is also the editor of numerous volumes on Beat and 1960s American literature, including The Portable Beat Reader, The Portable Sixties Reader, Beat Down To Your Soul, The Portable Jack Kerouac, and in 2010 Brother-Souls: John Clellon Holmes, Jack Kerouac, and the Beat Generation, which she co-authored with her husband.

Charters published a collection of her photographic portraits of well-known writers in the book Beats & Company. Her photographs of the Nobel-Prize winning Swedish poet Tomas Tranströmer illustrate Samuel Charters' English translation of Tranströmer's long poem Baltics (2012). She also photographed Olson in Gloucester, Massachusetts, in her book of their letters, Evidence of What Is Said (2015).

== Selected publications ==
- Charters, Ann (1967). A Bibliography of Works by Jack Kerouac: (Jean Louis Lebris De Kerouac) 1939–1967. New York: The Phoenix Bookshop.
- ___ (1968). Olson/Melville: A Study in Affinity. Berkeley: Oyez.
- ___, ed. (1970). Charles Olson, The Special View of History. Berkeley: Oyez.
- ___ (1973). Kerouac: A biography. San Francisco: Straight Arrow.
- ___ (1986). Beats and Company: Portrait of a Literary Generation. Garden City: Doubleday.
- ___ and Allen Ginsberg (1986). Scenes Along the Road: Photographs of the Desolation Angels.
- ___, ed. (1992). The Portable Beat Reader. Viking.
- ___, ed. (1996). The Portable Jack Kerouac Reader. New York: Viking.
- ___, ed. (1995). Jack Kerouac: Selected Letters, Vol 1, 1940–1956. Viking.
- ___, ed. (1999). Jack Kerouac: selected letters, Vol 2, 1957–1969. New York: Viking
- ___, ed. (2001). Beat down to your soul: What was the Beat Generation?. New York: Penguin.
- ___, ed. (2003). The Portable Sixties Reader. New York: Viking.
- ___ and Samuel Charters (2010). Brother-Souls: John Clellon Holmes, Jack Kerouac and the Beat Generation. Jackson: University Press of Mississippi.
- T.S. Eliot and Charles Olson: Young Tom and Charlie: Two American Poets at Home in Gloucester (2024). Selected with an introduction by Charters.
- The Story and Its Writer: An Introduction to Short Fiction
