= Dinosaurs (band) =

American rock band

- Origin: San Francisco Bay Area, California, U.S.
- Genres: Rock and roll, psychedelic rock, supergroup
- Years active: 1982-1989
- Label: Relix
- Website: dinosaurshomepage.html

Dinosaurs, formed in 1982, was an American, Bay Area-based supergroup, that emerged from the psychedelic music era of San Francisco.

The core group consisted of Peter Albin of Big Brother and the Holding Company, John Cipollina of Quicksilver Messenger Service, Spencer Dryden of Jefferson Airplane, Robert Hunter of the Grateful Dead, Barry Melton of Country Joe and the Fish and keyboardist Merl Saunders from the Saunders-Garcia Band. Over time Papa John Creach of Hot Tuna, Jack Casady of Jefferson Airplane, Nicky Hopkins, Dave Getz, Country Joe McDonald and other prominent San Francisco musicians guest starred with the group. In the 1990s, David LaFlamme of It's a Beautiful Day and Jerry Miller of Moby Grape also toured with this group.

The Dinosaurs became active in 1982, with Albin, Dryden, Cipollina, Melton, and Hunter at its center. Hunter left the group in 1985, before the end of its "classic" run, although he returned to record a track for their only album. By 1987, Merl Saunders had more or less taken Hunter's place in the band. The original group presumably ran its course up through 1989, at which point the group broke up. John Cipollina died just two weeks after the band's final concert, during which he had to sit in a wheelchair due to health issues.

In 1988, the band released its only studio album, Dinosaurs. In 2005, the band released a retrospective album on the Evangeline label, entitled Friends of Extinction.

They were the band that forced Dinosaur Jr. to add on the "Jr." in 1987, shortly after that band released You're Living All Over Me.

== Discography ==
- Dinosaurs (Relix Records, 1988)
- Friends of Extinction (2005)
