= African Journey: A Search for the Roots of the Blues =

Blues album by American historian Samuel Charters

African Journey: A Search for the Roots is a blues album by American historian Samuel Charters and is his attempt to examine how the American blues genre of the 1920s and 1930s can trace its roots and influences back to the tribal music of West Africa. Charters draws connections between the two, mainly covering similarities in their song content, instrument type, and instrument usage.

In 1974, Charters traveled the length of the West African "crescent", from Senegal to Nigeria. He then returned to travel up the Gambia River to a slave pen in Janjanbureh, following a similar path that would have been taken by slave traders. All of the album's musical performances were recorded by means of a tape recorder. The album was released as a double vinyl set. Volume One contains songs performed by historians as well as celebratory songs from The Gambia, Senegal, and Mali. Volume Two consists of funeral processions, dances, and songs from Ghana, Togo and The Gambia.

== Album Information: An Introduction and Notes to the Songs ==
The back cover of the album entitled: An Introduction and Notes to the Songs explains why Charters chose the area of West Africa for his research, as well as how he originally drew connections between West African music and the American delta blues.

Charters explains that, previously, one of the difficulties of understanding the history of the peoples of the slave trade was that records of African slave heritage were insufficient for historical context, as they provided little evidence as to where an individual slave or family was from. This, coupled with the fact that the slaves themselves came from cultures without written languages and without a clear idea of larger geographic areas, made it almost impossible to trace individual slave's roots. Charters then explains that the current research of his time has allowed historians to understand which tribes and peoples came from what areas and what music, language, and culture they brought with them. With this research, he was able to draw the initial connection between the blues genre and traditional African music.

He then begins to distinguish between the first slaves arriving from Senegal, The Gambia, and Guinea, and the later slaves coming from Ghana, Nigeria, and the Cameroons. The first group had established a distinctive Afro-American culture as they came to the colonies in groups and built the plantations. The second group was dispersed throughout the already formed plantations and adapted to this established culture. From this, he draws the conclusion that Afro-American music could be traced specifically back to the area of Africa between the Senegal River and southern Guinea.

Charters then discusses the distribution of individual tribes in the colonies. During the slave trade, the region of West Africa was in a constant internal struggle, which lead to large amount of wars. The losers of these wars were captured by the opposing tribe and sold to Europeans, unwilling entering them into the slave trade. Consequently, this meant that members of fierce warrior tribes hardly ever made their way to America.

Two tribes that were often found in slave colonies were the Wollofs and the Mandingoes. The end of the introduction draws the connection between these tribes and the blues of America. The cultural music of these tribes often includes stringed instruments and a singer/historian, or griot, whose role in the music closely parallels that of the bluesman.

== Songs ==
=== Volume One ===
==== Side One ====
Track 1: Kelefa Ba

Artists: Jali Nyama Suso

Instruments: Kora, vocals

Notes: Jali Nyama Suso played the Kora while a performer improvised his own texts around basic song materials.

Track 2: Alfa Yaya

Artists: Abdoulie Samba

Instruments: Xalam, vocals

Notes: Alfa Yaya is a praise song to a king of the Wollof.

Track 3: Jola Dance

Artists: Individuals not recorded. The dance was performed by many members of the tribe.

Instruments: Drums, Hand and Wooden Clappers, vocals

Notes: Tied directly to the Juba Dance of the colonies.

Track 4: Chedo

Artists: Jali Nyama Suso

Instruments: Kora, vocals

Notes: Chedo is the Fula word for Mandingo and this song describes the war between the Fula and Mandingo.

==== Side Two ====
Track 1: Bowdi

Artists: Alhaji Amara Sahone

Instruments: Konting, vocals

Notes: The konting is a larger xalam.

Track 2: Almami Samari Touray

Artists: Alhaji Fabala Kanuteh

Instruments: Balafon, vocals

Notes: Almami Samari Touray was a leader of Guinea during wartimes in the 19th Century.

=== Volume Two ===
==== Side Three ====
Track 1: Tutu Jara

Artists: Dela Kanuteh, Mawdo Suso, Karunka Suso

Instruments: Balafon, kora, vocals

Notes: The song chronicles a woman who wants to have a child but has to ask a snake for help.

Track 2: Yaha Yaha

Artist: Alhaji Sait Camara

Instruments: Xalam, vocals

Notes: Yaha Yaha is a praise for the President of Gambia.

==== Side Four ====
Track 1: Selati Nalim Koye

Artists: Falie Kuyateh

Instruments: Kora, vocals

Notes: Selati Nalim Koye is about a great warrior in Mandingo history.

Track 2: Ewe Drumming

Artists: Collective tribe.

Instruments: Drums, vocals

Notes: The recording is only a short period taken from a day-long drumming ceremony.
