= Blackburn & Snow =

US folk rock duo

- Sherry Snow and Jeff Blackburn in a 1966 Trident Productions publicity photo

Background information
- Origin: Berkeley, California, U.S.
- Genres: Folk rock
- Years active: 1965–1967
- Past members: Jeff Blackburn; Sherry Snow

Blackburn & Snow were a folk rock duo popular early in the mid-1960s San Francisco music scene in the United States. The duo consisted of guitarist-singer Jeff Blackburn and vocalist Sherry Snow.

== History ==
Both Blackburn and Snow were involved in the Bay Area music scene since 1964, and became romantically involved in 1965, living together in Berkeley, California and performing together in local clubs. They signed a contract in December 1965 with Kingston Trio producer Frank Werber's Trident Productions. Trident issued two Blackburn & Snow singles which were recorded in 1966: "Stranger in a Strange Land", released late December 1966 and "Time", released October 1967; the former was written by David Crosby of The Byrds, although it was credited to the fictitious Samuel F. Omar. The duo's recording of "Stranger in a Strange Land" has been called "a lost masterpiece". Snow was considered by friends in Jefferson Airplane as the replacement for the departing Signe Anderson in late 1966, however she chose to remain with Blackburn; Anderson was replaced by Grace Slick. The duo played a part in the popularization of the San Francisco Sound, performing throughout 1965–67 at venues such as the hungry i, the Fillmore Auditorium, Avalon Ballroom and Marty Balin's nightclub The Matrix. Blackburn & Snow performed at the KFRC Fantasy Fair and Magic Mountain Music Festival, a seminal rock festival in Marin County, California at the beginning of the Summer of Love.

== Studio recordings ==
Trident Productions intended to present Blackburn & Snow as a major new find, with Frank Werber later stating "my perception was that they were going to be huge." Enough material for an album was recorded through 1966 and into the spring of 1967, with Blackburn writing nearly all of the songs. The music the duo had been performing was electric folk rock similar to their close contemporaries Jefferson Airplane, with unique harmonic interplay between the couple. Influenced by The Everly Brothers, The Beatles and Buddy Holly, Blackburn & Snow recorded a number of straight rock songs with the backing band Candy Store Prophets, as well as some country and folk flavored material. The Candy Store Prophets were also the backing band for The Monkees first album and included Larry Taylor of Canned Heat and Gerry McGee, the long-time guitarist for The Ventures who joined that band in 1968. Gary "Chicken" Hirsh, later of Country Joe and the Fish, also drummed on some tracks. Production and engineering was handled by Randy Sterling. Though many completed songs were recorded, due to wrangling between Trident and distribution partner MGM-Verve, combined with some tension between the duo and Sterling, they did not see an album released during their partnership.

== Post-breakup ==
While living in the Bay Area during the sixties, Snow joined the Subud spiritual movement and adopted the name Halimah as part of her latihan experience, but continued to perform as Sherry Snow. Following a breakup with Blackburn in 1967, Snow joined Dan Hicks and his Hot Licks as a singer, performing on the album Original Recordings. After living in Indonesia, London, and Tunbridge Wells, in 1976 she married English potter Bran Collingwood, moved to Balquhidder in Perthshire, and raised two sons. After the family relocated to Northern California in 1983, Collingwood attended Humboldt State University in Arcata to complete her philosophy degree, and volunteered at university-owned NPR radio station KHSU. Broadcasting from KHSU as Halimah the Dreamah, beginning in 1991 Collingwood produced and hosted "Ethnic Excursions", a weekly program devoted to playing and discussion of international music styles, for 28 years. The program was abruptly cancelled in 2019 when the university, today called Cal Poly Humboldt, gutted KHSU radio station operations and dismissed all but two of the staff. Collingwood continues to reside in Arcata and is active with the Redwood Interfaith Gospel Choir.

Jeff Blackburn joined Moby Grape in the mid-seventies; with Bob Mosley he formed the Jeff Blackburn Band which with the addition of Neil Young and Johnny Craviotto became The Ducks, playing a series of impromptu bar gigs in Santa Cruz, California in 1977. During this time, Blackburn co-wrote "My My, Hey Hey (Out of the Blue)" with Young. Blackburn continued to perform, based in Santa Cruz with his band Buck N the Odds. On January 7, 2023 Collingwood announced, via her Facebook page, that Jeff Blackburn had died the previous night from undiagnosed ailments. He was 77. Neil Young released High Flyin′, a live recording of The Ducks, in April 2023.

In 1999, the mid-sixties Blackburn & Snow recordings from Trident Productions were finally released as a 20-song compact disc, titled Something Good for Your Head, with post-production re-mastering by producer and rock archivist Alec Palao.
