= Country Joe and the Fish =

American psychedelic rock band

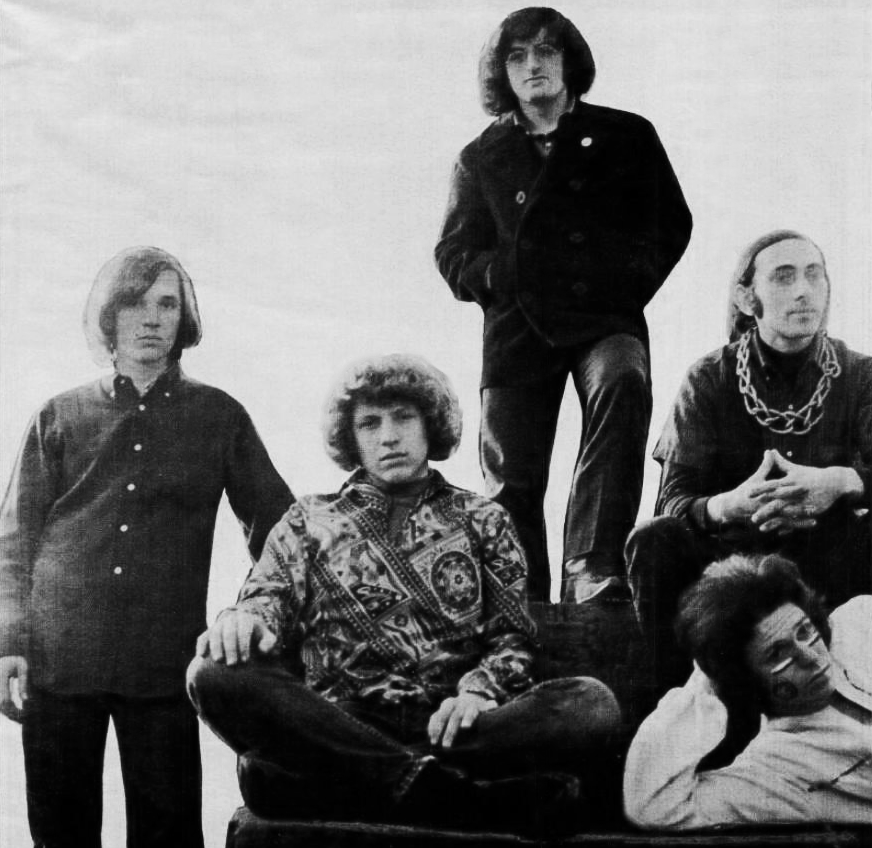
- Country Joe and the Fish in 1967

Background information
- Origin: Berkeley, California, United States
- Genres: Psychedelic rock; acid rock; folk rock
- Years active: 1965–1970; 1977; 2004–2006 (as Country Joe Band), sporadically thereafter
- Labels: Vanguard; Fantasy; Rag Baby Records
- Past members: Country Joe McDonald; Barry "The Fish" Melton; Gary "Chicken" Hirsh; David Bennett Cohen; Bruce Barthol; David Getz; Peter Albin; John Francis Gunning; Paul Armstrong; Mark Ryan; Gregory Leroy "Duke" Dewey; Mark Kapner; Doug Metzner
- Website: people.well.com/~cjfish/

Country Joe and the Fish was an American psychedelic rock band formed in Berkeley, California, in 1965. They were among the influential groups in the San Francisco music scene during the mid-to-late 1960s. Much of their music was written by founding members Country Joe McDonald and Barry "The Fish" Melton, with lyrics pointedly addressing issues of importance to the counterculture, such as anti-war protests, free love, and recreational drug use. Through a combination of psychedelia and electronic music, the band's sound was marked by innovative guitar melodies and distorted organ-driven instrumentals which were significant to the development of acid rock.

The band self-produced two EPs that drew attention on the underground circuit before signing to Vanguard Records in 1966. Their debut album, Electric Music for the Mind and Body, followed in 1967. It contained their only nationally charting single, "Not So Sweet Martha Lorraine", and their most experimental arrangements. Their second album, I-Feel-Like-I'm-Fixin'-to-Die, was released in late 1967; its title track, with its dark humor and satire, became their signature tune and is among the era's most recognizable protest songs. Further success followed, including McDonald's solo appearance as well as the band's appearance at Woodstock.

The group's lineup underwent changes, until its disbandment in 1970. Members of the band continue in the music industry as solo recording artists and sporadically reconvene. Members of Big Brother and The Holding Company often joined the band.

== History ==
=== Formation (1965) ===
The first lineup of Country Joe and the Fish formed in mid-1965, when Country Joe McDonald (vocals, acoustic guitar) and Barry "The Fish" Melton (lead guitar, vocals) came together as a duo. The two musicians had a background rooted in folk music, were enamored of the recordings of Woody Guthrie, and worked on the local acoustic coffeehouse circuit in the early 1960s. Melton honed his political protest prowess as a guitarist in Los Angeles, at venues such as the Ash Grove, before relocating to Berkeley, California, where he was a regular at the Jabberwock cafe. Prior to the group, McDonald set up two folk and jug bands, the Berkeley String Quartet and the Instant Jug Band, both of which served as outlets for his original material, and with the latter group including Melton. In addition, McDonald was a publisher of the left-wing underground magazine Et Tu, which later became Rag Baby, containing poetry, drawings, and political messages. By early 1965, McDonald had become involved in the burgeoning folk scene in Berkeley, and the Free Speech Movement that was organizing demonstrations in University of California, Berkeley, which opposed the war in Vietnam. Not long afterwards, McDonald was inspired to record a "talking issue" of his magazine, and organized Country Joe and the Fish with Melton and fellow musicians Carl Schrager (washboard, kazoo), Bill Steele (bass guitar), and Mike Beardslee (vocals), out of both necessity of a recording alias and political device, to self-produce an extended play.

ED Denson, the co-publisher of Rag Baby, introduced McDonald to Chris Strachwitz, who owned Arhoolie Recording Studios, to self-produce the EP. Sensing the band's potential, Denson assumed management control, and was responsible for coining the group's name—a reference to Josef Stalin and to Mao Zedong's description of revolutionaries as "the fish who swim in the sea of the people". McDonald, who had recording experience, began utilizing Arhoolie Recording Studios to record four songs split equally between the band and a local folk musician, Peter Krug. It was during this time at Arhoolie Records that Country Joe and the Fish's folk sound and political protest prowess—an amalgam of their own Guthrie-influenced material and their folk music roots—began to emerge. The band's side of the EP featured two originals by McDonald, an acoustic version of "I Feel Like I'm Fixin' to Die Rag", and "Superbird". According to McDonald, "The Fish Cheer" was written in 30 minutes, with a purpose of expressing satiric and dark commentary on the US's involvement in the Vietnam War. In October 1965, 100 copies of the EP, titled Rag Baby Talking Issue No. 1, were distributed on McDonald's independent label at a Teach-in in UC Berkeley and underground shops selling Rag Baby magazine.

For a brief period, McDonald and Melton performed together as a duo at college campuses in the Northwest on behalf of Students for a Democratic Society before returning as regulars at the Jabberwock cafe. The two were joined by local jug band musicians, including Melton's roommates, bass player Bruce Barthol and guitarist Paul Armstrong, and blues guitarist David Bennett Cohen, with whom Melton played in another jug band. The addition of drummer John Francis-Gunning rounded out the six-piece ensemble. It was during their residency at the Jabberwock that Country Joe and the Fish learned to play as a group and expand their repertoire. Within months, based on McDonald and Melton's interest in the live performances of the Paul Butterfield Blues Band, the recordings on Bob Dylan's album, Highway 61 Revisited, and their use of the mind-altering drug LSD, the group began equipping themselves with electric instruments and delving more into psychedelia. As a result, Cohen was moved over to the organ. Cohen's experience with keyboards was limited to having played piano at a semiprofessional capacity at the Jabberwock, but, nonetheless, he quickly adapted to the qualities of the instrument. Melton describes the change of the group: "Once we hit into the electric medium and into the rock medium, we were pandering to the public taste. We became extraordinarily popular. The little folk club where we used to play once every two weeks, we played every single night for a month, or something like that, and filled it. And after a while we filled two shows every single night".

Incidentally, the song "Who Am I" was written by McDonald for a play called Change Over, written by Fred Hayden. Each of the three verses was to be considered as sung by a different character.

=== Electric music (1966–1968) ===
As Country Joe and the Fish's popularity grew, the band relocated to San Francisco in early 1966 and became popular fixtures at the Avalon and the Filmore Auditorium. On June 6, 1966, the band recorded a second self-produced EP, which was packaged separately from the Rag Baby magazine and, upon its release, debuted the new psychedelic rock incarnation of the group. The EP fulfilled the band's ambitions to incorporate electric instruments into their music, effectively melding the instrumentals and pioneering an early template for the musical subgenre of acid rock. It included McDonald's compositions "(Thing Called) Love" and "Bass Strings" on the A-side and the six-minute "Section 43" on the B-side. Music historian Richie Unterberger praised "Section 43", saying its "Asiatic guitar, tribal maracas, devious organ, floating harmonica, and ethereal mid-sections of delicate koto-like guitar picking rivaled the Paul Butterfield Blues Band's East West as the finest psychedelic instrumental ever". Within three months, airplay of the EP spread across the new so-called progressive radio stations, reaching as far as New York City, and establishing Country Joe and the Fish as a nationally relevant musical act.

Through connections that Cohen had with record producer Samuel Charters, the group signed a recording contract with Vanguard Records in December 1966, just as the label, which had primarily released folk music, was attempting to branch out into the growing psychedelic rock scene. While the band waited to record their debut album, they were present at the Human Be-In, along with other influential San Francisco musical acts, including Jefferson Airplane, Big Brother and the Holding Company, and Quicksilver Messenger Service. The event was a prelude to the Summer of Love and helped publicize counterculture ideals such as ecology, free-love and the use of illicit drugs.

In February 1967, Country Joe and the Fish entered Sierra Sound Laboratories to record their debut album, Electric Music for the Mind and Body, with Charters and Denson overseeing the process. Prior to their studio work, Armstrong left the group and began a two-year alternative assignment as a conscientious objector, driving a truck for Goodwill Industries. Francis-Gunning was involved in the beginnings of the album's development but left when the rest of the band complained about his drumming technique. He was replaced by Gary "Chicken" Hirsh. The next recording session was postponed for three days as the most recognizable lineup of Country Joe and the Fish rehearsed with their new drummer at the Barn, in Santa Cruz. Hirsh's abilities were immediately distinguishable on the album, as he demonstrated an acute and articulate drum beat that music critic Bruce Eder praised as "some of the best drumming on a psychedelic record this side of the late Spencer Dryden".

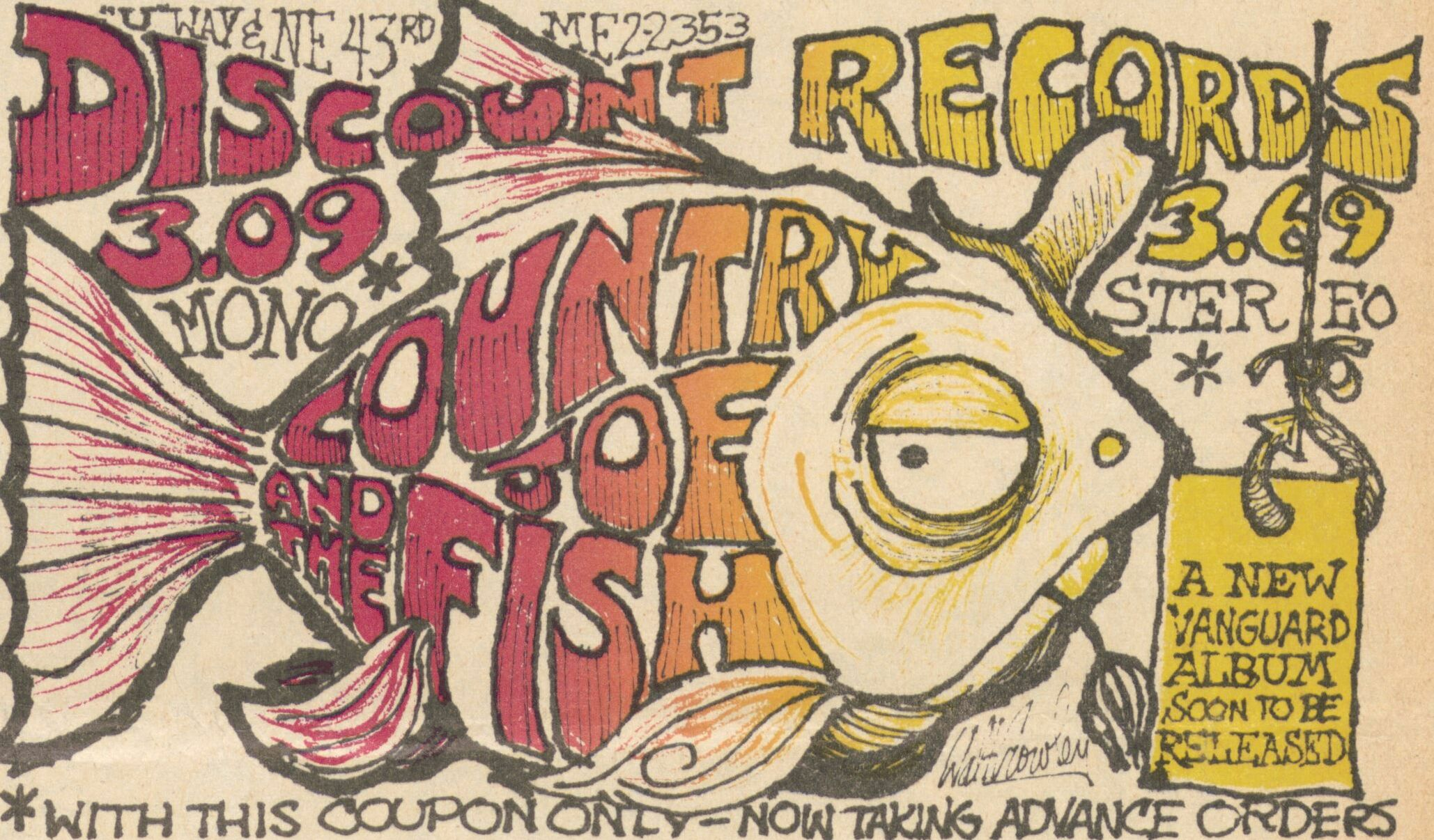
An April 1967 ad for Electric Music for the Mind and Body in the Seattle underground paper Helix.

Electric Music for the Mind and Body was released on May 11, 1967. Much of the album's material continued to expand upon the band's new psychedelic medium, with it embracing all facets of the members' influences, which ranged from their folk roots, blues, raga rock and hard rock. The album also saw Cohen coming forward in a larger role with inventive distorted-organ melodies. In addition, McDonald's lyrical content, which brazenly pronounced topics of political protest, recreational drug use, and love, augmented by satirical humor, clearly introduced the band's orientation and message. The compositional structures followed discrete movement patterns emulating the style of John Fahey, whom McDonald admired. Though Electric Music for the Mind and Body was among the most complex works to date, it possessed the quality that several other San Francisco acts shared of being recorded mostly live, with only the vocals being overdubbed after the instrumentals were completed.

Electric Music for the Mind and Body was a success upon release, charting at number 39 on the Billboard 200, and remains one of the most enduring psychedelic works of the counterculture era. A single, "Not So Sweet Martha Lorraine", was distributed a month prior to the release of the album and became the only Country Joe and the Fish single to chart, peaking at number 98 on the Billboard Hot 100, in large part a culmination of its airplay on FM broadcasting and college stations. A reworked version of "The Fish Cheer" was intended to be released as a track on the album. However, Charters vetoed the decision to see whether the controversial song "Superbird" would face a radio ban. Nonetheless, the band was considered a forerunner in the emerging music scene in San Francisco, exhibiting one of the more polished debuts, just as its contemporaries were still refining their own sound. Melton attributes the album's success, particularly in San Francisco, to the band's appearance at the Monterey Pop Festival in June 1967. Subsequently, the group toured the East Coast with an elaborate psychedelic light show.

The band returned to the studio, this time at Vanguard Studios in New York City, between July and September 1967. When "Superbird", a tune mocking President Lyndon Johnson, was not banned from radio promotion, the band was given the go-ahead to record "The Fish Cheer", which saw the group moving away from the original folk composition toward electric instrumentals more synthesized toward psychedelia. The song became the title track of the band's second album, I-Feel-Like-I'm-Fixin'-to-Die, released in November 1967. The album was not as successful as its predecessor, but still charted at number 67. The composition represented growing anti-war sentiment expressed by those opposing the Vietnam War, and is often considered one of the most recognized and celebrated protest songs of the era. "The Fish Cheer" was also pivotal in communicating the attitude against the war, but was set apart from other anti-war songs for its use of sarcastic humor and satire on the controversial conflict. Writer Lee Andresen reflects on the song's meaning, saying, "the happy beat and insouciance of the vocalist are in odd juxtaposition to the lyrics that reinforce the sad fact that the American public was being forced into realizing that Vietnam was no longer a remote place on the other side of the world, and the damage it was doing to the country could no longer be considered collateral, involving someone else."

The song met unprecedented exposure among the band's young audience after a performance at the Schaefer Music Festival in New York City, in the summer of 1968. Hirsh suggested that instead of the opening chorus spelling "fish", it would spell "fuck", giving birth to the infamous "Fuck Cheer". The crowd of young teenagers and college students applauded the act; however executives from The Ed Sullivan Show barred Country Joe and the Fish from their scheduled appearance on the program, and any other possible events. Hirsh never explained why he recommended the change in lyrics, but the act is seen as a social and political statement advocating free speech. The recorded version of "The Fish Cheer" received airplay, even on mainstream radio stations, which contributed to the success of the band's third album, Together, its most commercially successful. The album, released in August 1968, featured songwriting by all of the band members and charted at number 23 nationally.

=== Lineup changes and Woodstock (1969–1970) ===
In September 1968, Barthol left the band, just prior to their fourth album. His departure was due to the rest of the band's unwillingness to partake in the Festival for Life, an event established by the Youth International Party in Chicago that was intended to have the participation of several well-known musicians attract thousands of spectators for the 1968 Democratic National Convention. However, the city refused to issue any permits, and the band members, by majority vote, decided to withdraw out of fear that their equipment would be damaged. After the festival resulted in riots and violent clashes between demonstrators and the police, Barthol's conviction that Country Joe and the Fish should have held a larger role precipitated his departure from the group and move to England.

Between January 9 and 11, 1969, the band performed at the Fillmore West as a farewell to the group's most famous lineup, with Jack Casady of Jefferson Airplane standing in as the bass player. The band was joined by Jerry Garcia, Jorma Kaukonen, Steve Miller, and Mickey Hart for the 38-minute finale, "Donovan's Reef Jam". Recordings from the concerts were later assembled on the live album Live! Fillmore West 1969, released on March 12, 1996. Hirsh and Cohen left soon after recording the group's next album, Here We Are Again, and a new lineup was configured with Casady and David Getz, who formerly played drums with Big Brother and the Holding Company. The group released Here We Are Again in July 1969. It charted at number 48, and saw Country Joe and the Fish moving to a pop-oriented approach. Country Joe and the Fish's personnel remained relatively stable for the next six months, though Peter S. Albin, also an alumnus of Big Brother and the Holding Company, replaced Casady at bass.

However, when McDonald reassembled the band for a last-minute scheduling at the Woodstock Festival, another personnel change resulted in the group's final lineup, which included recruits Mark Kapner on keyboards, Doug Metzner on bass, and Greg "Duke" Dewey, formerly of Mad River, on drums. Among the festival's most memorable moments was McDonald's unexpected solo performance on August 16, 1969, which included "The Fuck Cheer" as a finale. The audience receptively responded by chanting along with McDonald. McDonald's rendition of "The Fuck Cheer" propelled the song into the mainstream culture in the U.S., and was featured on the Woodstock film, which was released on March 26, 1970. Radio stations regularly played both versions of the cheer, though the opposition to "The Fuck Cheer" limited its exposure to underground stations.

In December 1969, McDonald began his own career outside the band, releasing cover versions of Guthrie-penned songs on Thinking of Woody Guthrie, and country standards on Tonight I'm Singing Just For You. All the while, the group looked to capitalize on the momentum from Woodstock and their appearance in the films, Zachariah, and Gas-s-s-s, by releasing their fifth album, CJ Fish, in May 1970. The album was a moderate success, reaching number 111 nationally. However the band members lacked the motivation for touring and recording, which led to their disbandment in mid-1970.

=== Aftermath and reunions ===
McDonald pursued his solo recording career, which spans over 30 albums and remained an active anti-war campaigner. He also appeared in every Woodstock reunion festival since 1979. Melton performed solo as well, under the moniker "The Fish" and later became a member of the Bay Area supergroup, Dinosaurs, in the 1980s. Since 1982, Melton was able to practice law in California and became a Public Defender of Yolo County, California until his retirement in June 2009. Country Joe and the Fish members sporadically reconvene, most notably when the classic 1967 lineup recorded Reunion in 1977. The lineup, except Melton, came together again as the Country Joe Band in 2004. In the same year, the group resumed touring, released the Barthol-penned single, "Cakewalk to Baghdad", and the live album Live in Berkeley. Though the Country Joe Band disbanded in 2006, some of the members still occasionally tour together.

Hirsh died on August 17, 2021, at age 81. Barthol died on February 20, 2023, at age 75. McDonald died on March 7, 2026, at age 84.

== Discography ==
=== Singles ===
- "Not So Sweet Martha Lorraine" b/w "Masked Marauder" (1967) – No. 98 Billboard Hot 100
- "Janis" b/w "Janis (instrumental)" (1967)
- "Who Am I" b/w "Thursday" (1968)
- "Rock and Soul Music (Part 1)" b/w "Rock and Soul Music (Part 2)" (1968)
- "Here I Go Again" b/w "Baby You're Driving Me Crazy" (1969)
- "The 'Fish' Cheer/I-Feel-Like-I'm-Fixin'-to-Die Rag" b/w "Janis" (1969) - AUS No. 60
- "Hang On" b/w "Hand of Man" (1971)

=== EPs ===
- Talking Issue No. 1: Songs of Opposition, Rag Baby (1965)
- Country Joe and the Fish, Rag Baby (1966)

=== Studio albums ===
- Electric Music for the Mind and Body (1967) – No. 39 US
- I-Feel-Like-I'm-Fixin'-to-Die (1967) – No. 67 US
- Together (1968) – No. 23 US
- Here We Are Again (1969) – No. 48 US
- CJ Fish (1970) – No. 111 US, No. 34 AUS
- Reunion (1977)

=== Live album ===
- Live! Fillmore West 1969 (1994)
- Flyin' Back Home Again (San Francisco '68) (2020)

=== Compilations ===
- Greatest Hits, Vanguard (1969)
- The Life and Times of Country Joe and the Fish From Haight-Ashbury to Woodstock, Vanguard (1971)
- The Best of Country Joe & the Fish, Vanguard (1973)
- Collectors Items: The First Three EPs, Rag Baby (1980)
- Vietnam Experience (The Vietnam War, Dec 22, 1961–May 7, 1975), Rag Baby (1985)
- The Collected Country Joe and the Fish (1965 to 1970), Vanguard (1987)
- Time Flies By, Rag Baby (2012)
