= Folkways Records =

American record label (1948–1987)

- Parent company: Smithsonian Institution
- Founded: 1948
- Founder: Moses Asch; Marian Distler
- Defunct: 1987
- Status: Defunct
- Genre: Folk, traditional bluegrass, world music
- Country of origin: United States
- Location: Washington, D.C., U.S.
- Official website: folkways.si.edu

Folkways Records was a record label founded by Moses Asch that documented folk, world, and children's music. It was acquired by the Smithsonian Institution in 1987 and is now part of Smithsonian Folkways.

== History ==
The Folkways Records & Service Co., and its music publishing subsidiary Folkways Music Publishers, Inc., were founded by Moses Asch and Marian Distler in 1948 in New York City. Harold Courlander was editor of the Folkways Ethnic Library at the time and is credited with coming up with the name "Folkways" for the label. Asch sought to record and document sounds and music from everywhere in the world. From 1948 until Asch's death in 1986, Folkways Records released 2,168 albums. In December 1950, Folkways Music Publishers, Inc. was acquired by Howie Richmond.

In 1964, Asch helped MGM Records start Verve Folkways Records which evolved in 1967 into Verve Forecast Records. The Folkways catalog includes traditional and contemporary music from around the world as well as poetry, spoken word, language instruction, and field recordings of people and nature. Folkways was an early supporter of Woody Guthrie, Pete Seeger, and Lead Belly, who formed the center of the American folk music revival.

Folkways influenced a generation of folk singers by releasing old-time music from the 1920s and 1930s, such as Dock Boggs, Clarence Ashley, and contemporary performers like the New Lost City Ramblers. The Anthology of American Folk Music appeared on Folkways, as did the accompanying album to The Country Blues by Samuel Charters. Folkways was one of the earliest companies to release albums of world music, including the Music of the World's Peoples collection edited by Henry Cowell. It also released many spoken word albums, and other unusual repertoire. The albums came with a pull-out leaflet containing extensive liner notes.

== Smithsonian ==
Gangland Rhythms LP cover

The Smithsonian Institution Center for Folklife and Cultural Heritage in Washington, D.C. acquired Asch's Folkways recordings and business files after his death in 1986. This acquisition was initiated by Ralph Rinzler of the Smithsonian before Asch's death and completed by the Asch Family to ensure that the sounds and artists would be preserved for future generations. As a result, it was agreed to continue Asch's policy that all of the 2,168 titles would stay in print indefinitely regardless of market sales. The Smithsonian Folkways website uses the internet to make the recordings available as streaming samples, DRM-free digital downloads in MP3 and lossless FLAC formats, and on CDs via mail order.

A complete set of the Folkways recordings was also donated to the University of Alberta where Michael Asch, Moses Asch's son, was an anthropology professor. FolkwaysAlive, a joint initiative between the university and the Smithsonian founded in 2004 by Regula Qureshi and Michael Frishkopf, with support from VP Research Gary Kachanoski, is involved in digitization and archiving of the collection as well as maintaining a research center and sponsoring student research scholarships and an annual concert series.

Since acquiring Folkways, the Smithsonian has expanded Asch's collection by adding several other record labels, including Cook, Monitor, Fast Folk, Dyer-Bennet, and Paredon Records. They have released over 300 new recordings.

Smithsonian Folkways states that their mission "is the legacy of Moses Asch, who founded Folkways Records in 1948 to document 'people's music.'" They "are dedicated to supporting cultural diversity and increased understanding among peoples through the documentation, preservation, and dissemination of sound", and that "musical and cultural diversity contributes to the vitality and quality of life throughout the world." By making these recordings available, they intend to "strengthen people's engagement with their own cultural heritage and to enhance their awareness and appreciation of the cultural heritage of others."

Smithsonian Folkways has produced or co-produced a number of radio series based on Folkways collections. "The Folkways Collection" and "Sounds to Grow On" are co-produced with CKUA radio; "Tapestry of the Times" was co-produced by WYPR radio; and "Sound Sessions" was produced by the Smithsonian and broadcast on WAMU radio. "Sounds to Grow On" is hosted by Michael Asch, Professor Emeritus of Anthropology at the University of Alberta and the son of Moses Asch.

== Selected releases ==
- María Sabina. Mushroom Ceremony of the Mazatec Indians of Mexico (1957). [FR 8975].

Produced and recorded by R. Gordon Wasson and Valentina Pavlovna Wasson.

- Shirley Collins. False True Lovers (1959). [FG 3564].

Produced by Alan Lomax.

- Woody Guthrie. Dust Bowl Ballads (1964). [FH 5212]. (Originally released on Victor Records as a 3 x Shellac 10” set [P 27] in 1940)

Produced and recorded by Robert P. Weatherald.

- Elizabeth Cotten. Folksongs And Instrumentals With Guitar (1958). [FG 3526].

Produced and recorded by Mike Seeger.

- Ewan MacColl and Peggy Seeger. Two Way Trip(1959). [FW 8755].

Produced by Peggy Seeger.

- Michael Hurley. First Songs (1964) [FG 3581].

Produced and recorded by Frederic Ramsey.

- Haussein Shiekh and Radio Mogadisco Swahili Singers. Baijun Ballads: Somali Songs in Swahili(1971) [FW08504].

Recorded by Chet Williams and Hassan Hussein.

== See also ==
- Moses Asch
- Smithsonian Folkways
