= Something Good for Your Head =

Studio album by Blackburn & Snow
- Released: May 4, 1999
- Recorded: December, 1965–early 1967; San Francisco, California
- Genre: Folk rock, psychedelic rock
- Length: 52:02
- Label: Big Beat
- Producer: Frank Werber, Randy Sterling

Professional ratings
Review scores
Source	Rating
Allmusic	4.5/5 stars

Something Good for Your Head is an album by the San Francisco area folk rock duo Blackburn & Snow. The album consists of twenty songs recorded by Jeff Blackburn and Sherry Snow, along with various backing musicians, during their partnership in the mid-1960s. All but four of the songs were not released until being collected for the album, which was issued as a compact disc over thirty years later in 1999.

== Background ==
Jeff Blackburn and Sherry Snow began performing together in 1965 in Berkeley, California. Along with their friends in Jefferson Airplane, the duo were part of the early wave of folk rock musicians that crafted the San Francisco Sound. They signed a contract in December 1965 with Kingston Trio producer Frank Werber's Trident Productions. Werber planned to present Blackburn & Snow as a major new find, but delayed a full presentation while recording material for an album throughout 1966 and into the spring of 1967.

== Recording ==
The music the duo had been performing was electric folk rock similar to their close contemporaries Jefferson Airplane, with unique harmonic interplay between the couple typified by the song "Do You Realize". Influenced by The Everly Brothers, The Beatles and Buddy Holly, Blackburn & Snow recorded a number of straight rock songs with the backing band Candy Store Prophets as well as some country and folk flavored material, with Blackburn writing nearly all of the songs.

A fast rocker, "It's So Hard" showcases the playing of McGee, as does the more country influenced "Everyday Brings Better Things", while "Yes Today" and "Takin' it Easy" are psychedelic folk prototypes that emphasize the duo's intricate harmonizing. Though many completed songs were recorded, Blackburn & Snow broke up in 1967 and failed to see an album released during their partnership. Trident and distribution partner MGM-Verve had difficulties over the project which were added to existing tension between the duo and their producer as described by Randy Sterling, and Werber ultimately shelved the album. Other than two singles, the material remained unreleased until the 1999 issue of Something Good for Your Head.

== Singles ==
"Stranger in a Strange Land" has been said to have been written by David Crosby of The Byrds (an instrumental demo of the song was included on the CD release of Turn! Turn! Turn!), although it was credited to the fictitious Samuel F. Omar. The title and lyrics are based on the Robert A. Heinlein science fiction novel that was widely popular among the San Francisco youth culture in the mid-1960s. It was released as a single backed with "Uptown-Downtown" in late December 1966, while the single "Post-War Baby"/"Time" was released in October 1967.

== Track listing ==
1. "Stranger in a Strange Land" (Samuel F. Omar) – 2:27
2. "Yes Today" (Jeff Blackburn) – 3:24
3. "Takin' It Easy" (Jeff Blackburn) – 3:23
4. "Time" (Jeff Blackburn) – 2:56
5. "It's So Hard" (Jeff Blackburn, Randy Sterling) – 3:07
6. "Do You Realize" (Jeff Blackburn) – 3:35
7. "Sure or Sorry" (Jeff Blackburn) – 2:27
8. "Unchain My Heart" (Freddy James, Agnes Vivian Jones) – 1:48
9. "Uptown-Downtown" (Jeff Blackburn) – 2:12
10. "Some Days I Feel Your Lovin'" (Jeff Blackburn) – 3:09
11. "Post-War Baby" (Jeff Blackburn) – 1:49
12. "Think" (Jeff Blackburn) – 2:17
13. "No Kidding" (Jeff Blackburn) – 1:57
14. "I Recall The Day" (Jeff Blackburn) – 2:50
15. "Everyday Brings Better Things" (Jeff Blackburn) – 3:18
16. "Stand Here" (Jeff Blackburn) – 2:40
17. "I Don't Want You Back Babe" (Jeff Blackburn) – 1:31
18. "Stop Leanin' on Me" (Jeff Blackburn) – 2:15
19. "Post-War Baby" (Alternate Version) – 1:45
20. "Pass This Way" (Backing Track) (Jeff Blackburn) – 3:12

== Personnel ==
- Jeff Blackburn: vocal, guitar
- Sherry Snow: vocal, percussion
- Guitars: Gerry McGee, Jeff Blackburn, Bob Jones, Bill Fulton
- Bass: Larry Taylor, Randy Sterling, Steve Talbot, Tom Sullivan
- Drums: Bill Lewis, Gary "Chicken" Hirsh, John Chambers
- Harmonica: Will Scarlett

== Production ==
- Producers: Frank Werber, Randy Sterling
- Engineer: Randy Sterling
