= The Masked Marauders =

1969 album concocted by Rolling Stone editors

Studio album by the Masked Marauders
- Released: November 1969
- Recorded: October 1969
- Genre: Rock
- Length: 33:39
- Labels: Reprise; Deity (Original); Rhino (Re-release)
- Producer: Deity Records

Singles from The Masked Marauders
- 1. "Cow Pie / I Can't Get No Nookie" Released: November 1969

Professional ratings
Review scores
Source	Rating
AllMusic	1.5/5 stars

The Masked Marauders is a record album released on the Warner Bros./Reprise/Deity label in the fall of 1969 that was part of an elaborate hoax concocted by Rolling Stone magazine.

In its October 18, 1969 issue, Rolling Stone ran a tongue-in-cheek review of a non-existent album that purportedly captured a "super session" of the era's leading rock and roll musicians, including Bob Dylan, Mick Jagger, George Harrison, John Lennon, and Paul McCartney. The review claimed that none of the artists could be listed on the jacket cover because of contractual agreements with their recording companies. The editors involved decided to extend the joke by hiring a relatively obscure band to record an actual album and then secured a deal with Warner Bros. As an indication of how many people were taken in by the joke, The Masked Marauders reached No. 114 on Billboard's album chart.

The original cover from the Rolling Stone article featured a photo of Sharon Tate From a 1967 issue of Playboy by her then husband Roman Polanski, to promote their movie The Fearless Vampire Killers. The photo was replicated by Ed Thrasher, after Tate’s death from the mansion family in 1969.

== Rolling Stone spoof ==
The Masked Marauders began as a spoof dreamed up by Rolling Stone editor Greil Marcus. Under the pseudonym T.M. Christian (a reference to Terry Southern's novel The Magic Christian), Marcus wrote a satiric review of a fictitious double bootleg album in collaboration with record reviewer Bruce Miroff. The review was intended to parody the "supergroup" trend then taking place (Crosby, Stills, Nash & Young, Blind Faith) and was also inspired by Great White Wonder, a double album of unreleased Dylan recordings often credited as the first bootleg.

Many readers, however, took the review seriously, despite its obvious jokes:

- "Produced by Al Kooper, the album was recorded with impeccable secrecy in a small town near the site of the original Hudson Bay Colony in Canada."
- "The LP opens with an eighteen-minute version of 'Season of the Witch' (lead vocal by Dylan, on which he does a superb imitation of early Donovan). The cut is highlighted by an amazing jam between bass and piano, both played by Paul McCartney."
- "Dylan shines on Side Three, displaying his new deep bass voice, with 'Duke of Earl'."
- "Paul showcases his favorite song, 'Mammy', and while his performance is virtually indistinguishable from Eddie Fisher's version, it is still very powerful, evocative, and indeed, stunning. And they say a white boy can't sing the blues!"
- "It can truly be said that this album is more than a way of life; it is life."

== Recording sessions and contract ==
Enquiries began pouring into Rolling Stone regarding the album's availability, not only from fans and retailers, but reportedly from the artists' managers, Allen Klein (Beatles and Rolling Stones) and Albert Grossman (Dylan). The response sparked part two of the put-on: the album itself. Marcus and Rolling Stone editor Langdon Winner recruited the Cleanliness and Godliness Skiffle Band, a Berkeley, California, group which had an album the previous year on Vanguard Records and played frequently at San Francisco's Fillmore and Avalon ballrooms. The group initially recorded three of the songs cited in the review: the Nashville Skyline-inspired instrumental "Cow Pie", Jagger doing "I Can't Get No Nookie" (deemed "an instant classic"), and Dylan's "Duke of Earl".

After the songs aired on San Francisco and Los Angeles radio stations – from tapes Marcus supplied – the pranksters began looking for a major label to produce an album. Several recording companies expressed an interest, but Warner Bros. won the production rights, offering a $15,000 advance plus its considerable promotional power. In November 1969, Warner released The Masked Marauders as a single LP on its newly created Deity label, distributed by Reprise. The album, which sold more than 100,000 copies, spent 12 weeks on the Billboard album chart, peaking at No. 114. The single "Cow Pie" appeared on the Bubbling Under the Hot 100 chart at No. 123 for one week on November 29, 1969.

== Original and follow-up releases ==
Tipping off buyers to the joke (albeit after they had purchased the album), Warner inserted the Rolling Stone review as well as a San Francisco Chronicle column by critic Ralph J. Gleason, a co-founder of Rolling Stone. Gleason found it incredible anyone believed the review and declared the gag a "delightful bit of instant mythology." The closing track, "Saturday Night at the Cow Palace," also made clear the album was all in fun. The track featured a riotous monologue by a record buyer so indignant at being taken in by the hoax that he vows, "When I get through with those people at Deity Records, I'll have them walking out of the building in barrels." The album's liner notes, penned by "T.M. Christian," also offered its share of clues, most notably the line:

"In a world of sham, the Masked Marauders, bless their hearts, are the genuine article."

In 2001, Rhino Records, under its Handmade label, remastered the album, releasing a numbered edition of 2,000 copies entitled The Masked Marauders - The Complete Deity Recordings. The lineup of songs is the same as on the original LP, except for bonus tracks of the monaural single, "I Can't Get No Nookie" b/w "Cow Pie". The title of the re-issue posed yet another joke: the album was Deity's only recording. As one of its contributions to the spoof, Warner created Deity under its Reprise subsidiary to match the name of the non-existent record company credited in the Rolling Stone review.

== Media coverage ==
The story of The Masked Marauders hoax was featured in an April 5, 2013, segment of the TV program Rock Center with Brian Williams.

== Track listing ==
=== Side one ===
1. "I Can't Get No Nookie" (The Masked Marauders) – 5:29
  - Features vocals by a Mick Jagger impersonator. This track is sometimes mislabeled as an outtake from the Rolling Stones' Jamming with Edward! sessions.
2. "Duke of Earl" (E. Dixon, E. Edwards, B. Williams) – 3:21
  - Also briefly incorporates "Blue Moon" (Rodgers, Hart).
  - Features vocals by a Bob Dylan impersonator.
3. "Cow Pie" (The Masked Marauders) – 2:18
  - Instrumental, but features extremely brief spoken vocals by a Bob Dylan impersonator. This song was also released as a single (Deity 0870), with the B-side I Can't Get No Nookie.
4. "I Am The Japanese Sandman (Rang Tang Ding Dong)" (A. Williams) – 3:45
5. "The Book of Love" (W. Davis, C. Patrick, G. Malone) – 2:21
  - Also briefly incorporates "Norwegian Wood" (J. Lennon, P. McCartney).
  - The group's John Lennon impersonator is heard speaking briefly at the end of this track.

=== Side two ===
6. "Later" (W. Davis, C. Patrick, G. Malone) – 1:11
  - A continuation of "The Book Of Love".
7. "More or Less Hudson's Bay Again" (The Masked Marauders) – 3:31
  - Features vocals by a Bob Dylan impersonator.
8. "Season of the Witch" (Donovan Leitch) – 10:13
  - Features vocals by the Mick Jagger and Bob Dylan impersonators.
9. "Saturday Night at the Cow Palace" (The Masked Marauders) – 1:30
  - A spoken monologue atop a piano rendition of "Cow Pie," with a disgruntled voice profanely denouncing the album as a rip-off.

=== CD bonus tracks ===
10. "I Can't Get No Nookie" (The Masked Marauders) – 5:02 (Monaural)
11. "Cow Pie" (The Masked Marauders) – 2:18 (Monaural)

== Musicians ==
As listed on the Rhino Handmade CD release:

- Langdon Winner: Piano and Backing Vocals
- Annie "Dynamite" Johnson: Vocals and Percussion
- Phil Marsh: Vocals and Guitar
- Brian Voorheis: Vocals, Guitar and Harmonica
- Vic Smith: Bass
- Anna Rizzo: Drums
- Mark "The Fox" Voorheis: Drums and Vocals on "Saturday Night at the Cow Palace"
- Gary Salzman: Lap Steel
- Allen Chance: Vocals on "More or Less Hudson's Bay Again"
