= Bruce Barthol =

American musician and songwriter (1947–2023)

Bruce Barthol (November 11, 1947 – February 20, 2023) was an American musician, singer and songwriter. Born at Alta Bates Hospital, Berkeley, California, he was the original bass player for the psychedelic rock band Country Joe and the Fish, from its inception through November 1968. According to the Bethel Woods Center for the Arts, Barthol's departure from Country Joe and the Fish stemmed from a dispute with other band members over a potential performance at the 1968 Democratic National Convention protests, as well as to avoid being drafted into military service.

Staying on in England after a European tour eventually led to the formation of Formerly Fat Harry with Gary Peterson and fellow Berkeley native, and one time denizen of The Jabberwock, Phil Greenberg. Upon his return to the Bay Area in 1972, Barthol formed Energy Crisis with some ex-members of the Cleanliness and Godliness Skiffle Band before becoming the musical director for the Tony Award-winning San Francisco Mime Troupe in 1976. From 2004 to 2006, Barthol joined ex-Country Joe and the Fish members Joe McDonald, David Bennett Cohen and Chicken Hirsh for a number of short tours of the United States and the UK. Retirement from the San Francisco Mime Troupe came in 2009 together with the release with an acclaimed solo album The Decline and Fall of Everything. He has also written for the San Francisco Shakespeare Festival and the Oberlin Dance Company. Barthol was also the bass player with the Former Members who include Greg Douglass, Roy Blumenfeld and David Bennett Cohen in their line-up. He held an MFA in Musical Theater from New York University.

Barthol died in hospice care in Sebastopol, California, on February 20, 2023, at the age of 75.

== Sources ==
- Country Joe's Place
