= Gary Hirsh =

American drummer (1940–2021)

Gary "Chicken" Hirsh (March 9, 1940 – August 17, 2021) was an American drummer, best known for his work with the rock group Country Joe and the Fish.

Hirsh was born in Chicago, Illinois. In December 1966, he replaced John Francis Gunning, but left the band in 1969. He then opened an art supply shop called Abraxas in Oakland, California and later went to New York, before returning to Berkeley. He is said to be the one who altered the FISH cheer at a concert at New York's Central Park. He also played with the group Blackburn & Snow, and with the Cleanliness and Godliness Skiffle Band. In 1972 he played and recorded with Touchstone, with one of his paintings appearing on the inside of the album. He was latterly a painter, T-shirt manufacturer, and jazz drummer living in Ashland, Oregon, and had reunited with the Country Joe Band.

Hirsh was married to Susan L. Solomon in 1968 and they had a son, Tree Adams. They later divorced. He married Terry Rhorer in 1975 and fathered two more children. He died in Ashland, Oregon, on August 17, 2021, at the age of 81.
