= Samuel Charters =

American music historian and musician (1929–2015)

- Born: Samuel Barclay Charters IV; August 1, 1929; Pittsburgh, Pennsylvania, U.S.
- Died: March 18, 2015 (aged 85); Stockholm, Sweden
- Education: Sacramento City College; University of California, Berkeley
- Occupations: Music historian; writer; record producer; musician; poet
- Spouse: Ann Charters (m. 1959)
- Children: 3

Samuel Barclay Charters IV (August 1, 1929 – March 18, 2015) was an American music historian, writer, record producer, musician, and poet. He was a widely published author on the subjects of blues and jazz. He also wrote fiction.

== Early life and education ==
Charters was born in Pittsburgh, Pennsylvania, into an upper-middle-class family that was interested in listening to and playing music of all sorts. "I grew up in a world of band rehearsals, blues records, and a whole consciousness of jazz. . . . The family also played ragtime, also played Debussy, also was involved in hearing Bartok's new music. It was a general musical cultural interest in which jazz was central" Charters first became enamored of blues music in 1937, after hearing Bessie Smith's version of Jimmy Cox's song, "Nobody Knows You When You're Down and Out". He moved with his family to Sacramento, California, at the age of 15. Charters says that he was "playing clarinet, playing jazz steadily all this time; I had my first orchestra when I was thirteen. . . . I had no natural abilities, but I soldiered on, and it was this that directly lead [sic] me to the beginning of the research". He attended high schools in Pittsburgh and California and attended Sacramento City College, graduating in 1949. After completing military service during the Korean War, he received a bachelor's degree in economics from the University of California at Berkeley in 1956.

== Life and work ==
In the 1940s and 1950s, though he was mostly immersed in studying and playing jazz, Charters also purchased numerous old recordings of American blues musicians. He eventually amassed a huge and valuable collection and beginning to understand that blues and jazz were connected in the history of black music. In 1950 he boarded a Greyhound bus in Sacramento, California, bound for New Orleans, where he sought jazz clarinet lessons with the great George Lewis. Instead, he found himself searching the streets in Texas for evangelist Blind Willie Johnson, who had recently passed. He returned to New Orleans, Louisiana, where he absorbed the history and culture he had previously only read about; he lived there for most of the 1950s, moving back and forth between Berkeley and New Orleans. He served for two years in the United States Army (1951–53) and began to study jazz clarinet with George Lewis.

Charters was always interested in politics and had wished to play a role in public life, but because he had run afoul of the House Un-American Activities Committee while in the Army in 1952, he decided that he would have to engage in politics without holding any sort of office. "For me, the writing about black music was my way of fighting racism. That's why my work is not academic, that is why it is absolutely nothing but popularization: I wanted people to hear black music, as I said in The Poetry of the Blues. . . . It's where I say, you know, if by introducing music I can have somebody look across the racial divide and see a black face and see this person as a human being—and that's why my work is unashamedly romantic"). Charters always thought of blues as containing within it a small and pure strain of folk poetry, something that ran through the lyrics of early artists such as Charley Patton and Blind Willie McTell, but which was lost in the later, more commercialized, blues. "I really got bored with all those damn guitar solos. To me, they all sounded like B.B. King, and what I really wanted to hear was great text. . . ." The poetry of the blues, then, Charters thought of as profound human cultural expression that could connect all people who love poetry.

Charters had for years been researching the history of jazz, but in the 1950s he also began to study the blues. Noticing that his copy of the bluesman Robert Johnson's recordings were recorded in San Antonio, Charters set out for Texas in 1953 to discover what he could about Robert Johnson and another of his favorite musicians, Blind Willie Johnson. With Charters's search for Robert Johnson began his years of doing field recordings (initially for Folkways Records throughout the United States and then in the Bahamas in 1958, where he made the first recordings of Joseph Spence). His 1959 recordings of the Texas bluesman Lightnin' Hopkins proved instrumental in Hopkins's rediscovery. Also in 1959, Charters published his influential book The Country Blues, the first history of blues and an absorbing account of his search for the bluesmen themselves, with a companion album of the same title to accompany it. He also produced psychedelic music, producing the first four albums for Country Joe & The Fish, including their song 'I-Feel-Like-I'm-Fixin'-To-Die-Rag.'

During the years of field work in the 1950s that lead to the publication of The Country Blues, Charters always felt overwhelmed with the amount of work required to properly document the music of black Americans and hoped that his writing would encourage others to join him. "I always had the feeling that there were so few of us, and the work so vast. That's why I wrote the books as I did—to romanticize the glamor of looking for old blues singers. I was saying, 'Help! This job is really big, and I really need lots of help!' I really exaggerated this, but it worked! My God, I came back from that year in Europe and I found kids doing research in the South. . . . They almost all came to me at some point, they wrote me a letter saying this is what I'm doing".

It was at this point that Charters was asked by Ken Goldstein of the fledgling Bluesville Line of Prestige Records to travel to Memphis to record Furry Lewis, and then Pink Anderson in Spartanburg, South Carolina. Sam recorded a number of other bluesmen during these travels, which in part led to his firing at Prestige. It also led to the creation of "The Blues," the first-ever blues movie shot in the heavily racist American South, shot by Sam and his wife Ann. After disappearing for many years, the film reappeared in a package entitled Searching for Secret Heros, created and distributed by Document Records in 2020.

Charters's writings have been influential, bringing to light aspects of African-American music and culture that had previously been largely unknown to the general public, as well as publishing poetry and novels. His writings include numerous books on the subjects of blues, jazz, African music, and Bahamian music, as well as liner notes for numerous sound recordings.

In 1963 and 1964 Charters managed the newly formed Prestige Folklore record label. From 1966 to 1970 he worked as a producer for the psychedelic, anti-war band Country Joe and the Fish (all albums except CJ Fish in 1970). He was also affiliated with the European Sonet Records label and in 1970 produced Rock Around the Country, an album by Bill Haley & His Comets, for Sonet.

He became disenchanted with American politics during the Vietnam War and moved with his family to Sweden, establishing a new life there despite not being able to speak the language at first. He divided his time between Sweden (where he had Swedish citizenship, though maintaining his U.S. citizenship) and Connecticut. He helped produce the music of various Swedish musical groups and translated into English the works of the Swedish writer Tomas Tranströmer, who won the Nobel Prize for Literature in 2011.

Charters was a Grammy Award winner, and his book The Country Blues was inducted into the Blues Hall of Fame in 1991 as one of the "Classics of Blues Literature." In 2000, he and his wife donated the Samuel & Ann Charters Archive of Blues and Vernacular African American Musical Culture to the Thomas J. Dodd Research Center of the University of Connecticut in Storrs, Connecticut. The archive contains materials collected during the couple's decades of work documenting and preserving African-American music throughout the United States, the Caribbean, and Africa. The archive's materials include more than 2,500 sound recordings, as well as video recordings, photographs, monographs, sheet music, field notes, correspondence, and musicians' contracts.

In 2008, Charters published, A Trumpet Around the Corner: The Story of New Orleans Jazz. In 2014, he published The Harry Bright Dances, a short work of fiction, which he described as "a fable"; Things to Do Around Picadilly; and What Paths, What Journeys: New and Selected Poems. That year he and his wife also established the Sam and Ann Charters Collection of Swedish Art at Augustana College in Rock Island, Illinois.

== Personal life ==
Charters's first marriage, to Mary Louise Lange at the age of 20, ended in divorce. In 1959, he married the writer, editor, Beat Generation scholar, photographer, and pianist Ann Charters (b. 1936), whom he met at the University of California, Berkeley during the 1954–55 academic year in a music class; she is a retired professor of English and American literature at the University of Connecticut. The two collaborated on many projects, particularly their extensive field recordings, as in the film The Blues (1962). In The Day Is So Long and the Wages So Small, Charters described their musical adventures on Andros Island in the Bahamas in 1958. He had three children, one with his first wife, two with his second.

Charters died at his home in Årsta, Stockholm, Sweden, on March 18, 2015, of myelodysplastic syndrome, a type of bone marrow cancer.

== Publications ==
- 1959, The Country Blues. New York: Rinehart. Reprinted 1975, Da Capo Press, with a new introduction by the author.
- 1962, Jazz: A History of the New York Scene. Garden City, New York: Doubleday (with Leonard Kunstadt).
- 1963, The Poetry of the Blues. With photos by Ann Charters. New York: Oak Publications.
- 1963 - Jazz New Orleans (1885–1963): An Index to the Negro Musicians of New Orleans. New York: Oak Publications.
- 1967, The Bluesmen. New York: Oak Publications.
- 1969, To This Place. Berkeley: Oyez Press.
- 1971, Some Poems/Poets: Studies in American Underground Poetry Since 1945, with photographs by Ann Charters. Berkeley: Oyez Press.
- 1972, From a Swedish Notebook. Berkeley: Oyez Press.
- 1972, Larry Eigner Selected Poems. Co-edited with Andrea Wyatt. Berkeley: Oyez Press
- 1973, Robert Johnson. New York: Oak Publications.
- 1975, The Legacy of the Blues: A Glimpse Into the Art and the Lives of Twelve Great Bluesmen: An Informal Study. London: Calder & Boyars.
- 1976, In Lagos. Berkeley: Oyez Press.
- 1977, Sweet As the Showers of Rain. New York: Oak Publications.
- 1979, Spelmännen: bilder och ord. Samlade av Samuel Charters; översättning av Rolf Aggestam. Wahlström & Widstrand.
- 1980, Of Those Who Died. Berkeley: Oyez Press.
- 1981, The Roots of the Blues: An African Search. Boston: M. Boyars.
- 1983, Mr. Jabi and Mr. Smythe. New York: Marion Boyars. His first novel
- 1984, Jelly Roll Morton's Last Night at the Jungle Inn: An Imaginary Memoir. New York: M. Boyars.
- 1986, Louisiana Black: A Novel. New York: M. Boyars.
- 1991, The Blues Makers. (Incorporates The Bluesmen and Sweet As the Showers of Rain). Da Capo.
- 1992, A Country Year. Berkeley: Oyez Press.
- 1992, Elvis Presley Calls His Mother After the Ed Sullivan Show. Minneapolis: Coffee House Press.
- 1999, The Day Is So Long and the Wages So Small: Music on a Summer Island. New York: Marion Boyars.
- 2000, Blues Faces: A Portrait of the Blues.
- 2004, Walking a Blues Road: A Selection of Blues Writing, 1956–2004. New York: Marion Boyars.
- 2006, New Orleans: Playing a Jazz Chorus. Marion Boyars.
- 2007, Bebo Valdés, portrait d'une légende cubaine.
- 2008, A Trumpet Around the Corner: The Story of New Orleans Jazz. Jackson: University Press of Mississippi.
- 2009, A Language of Song: Journeys in the Musical World of the African Diaspora.
- 2014, The Harry Bright Dances: A Fable. Portents.
- 2015, Songs of Sorrow: Lucy McKim Garrison and Slave Songs of the United States.

== Sound recordings ==
- 1951, The Happy Brass Deceivers, "Big Chief Battle Axe"; The Memphis Hometown Jug Band Five, "When the Saints Go Marching In" (78 rpm single). Charters, a band member, contributed vocals and clarinet. The recording was financed by his then-wife's father. According to Charters' A Checklist of Productions, Recordings, Compilations, and Writings for Album Release, 1951-2000 (unpublished): "A friend, Russ Solomon, was running a small record shop in the back of his father's pharmacy in the Tower Theater building in Sacramento and his Tower Records was the first - and maybe the only - shop to have our record in stock." Brandt Records.
- 1954, Billie and Dee Dee Pierce: The Music of New Orleans Vol. 3, The Music of the Dance Halls (selected tracks). Folkways Records. Selected tracks re-released in 1993 as part of Rhino Records' "Blues Masters" series, on Blues Masters 11: Classic Women Blues.
- 1954, Blind Dave Ross: Blind Willie Johnson (selected tracks). Folkways Records.
- 1954, The Mobile Strugglers: American Skiffle Bands (selected tracks). Folkways Records.
- 1954, Ramblin' Jack Elliott and Derroll Adams. Unreleased.
- 1955, Angeline Johnson: Blind Willie Johnson (selected tracks. Folkways Records.
- 1959, Lighting Hopkins: Lightning Hopkins. Folkways Records.
- 1959, Joseph Lamb: A Study in Classic Ragtime. Folkways Records.
- 1959, The Music of New Orleans: Vol. 4 The Birth of Jazz. Folkways Records.
- 1959, The Country Blues. RBF/Folkways Records. Compilation album released in conjunction with Charters' book The Country Blues.
- 1960, Furry Lewis: Furry Lewis. Folkways Records.
- 1961, Pink Anderson: Carolina Blues Man, Vol. 1. Prestige/Bluesville Records.
- 1961, Pink Anderson: Medicine Show Man, Vol. 2. Prestige/Bluesville Records.
- 1961, Pink Anderson, Ballad & Folksinger, Vol. 3. Prestige/Bluesville Records.
- 1962, Backcountry Barrelhouse, Barrelhouse Buck McFarland. Folkways Records.
- 1962, Ann Charters: An Essay in Ragtime. Folkways Records.
- 1963, J.D. Short/Son House: The Blues of the Mississippi Delta. Folkways Records.
- 1964, Ali Akbar Kahn and Ravi Shankar: The Master Musicians of India. Prestige Records.
- 1964, The Holy Modal Rounders. Prestige Records.
- 1964, The Music of the Bahamas: Vol. 1 Bahaman Folk Guitar, Joseph Spence. Folkways Records.
- 1964, The Music of the Bahamas: Vol. 2 Sacred Music, Launching Songs, and Ballads. Folkways Records.
- 1964, The Music of the Bahamas: Vol. 3 Instrumental Music from the Bahamas. Folkways Records.
- 1964, New Orleans Jazz The 'Twenties Folkways Records.
- 1965, Herman Melville: Moby Dick or The Whale. Read by Louis Zorich. Folkways Records.
- 1965, Charles Ives: The Sonatas for Violin and Piano. Folkways Records.
- 1965, Charles Ives: The Short Piano Pieces. Folkways Records.
- 1965, Chicago Blues (Vols. 1 - 3). Series titled "Chicago/The Blues/Today!" Vanguard Records.
- 1965, "Terry Callier: The New Folk Sound of Terry Callier." Prestige Records.
- 1967, Country Joe and the Fish: Electric Music for the Mind and Body. Vanguard Records.
- 1967, Country Joe and the Fish: I-Feel-Like-I'm-Fixin'-To-Die. Vanguard Records.
- 1967, Buddy Guy: A Man and the Blues. Vanguard Records.
- 1968, John Fahey: Requia. Vanguard Records.
- 1968, Junior Wells: Coming at You! Vanguard Records.
- 1968, Buddy Guy: This is Buddy Guy! Vanguard Records.
- 1967, Country Joe & The Fish: Here We Are Again
- 1969, The Frost: Frost Music. Vanguard Records.
- 1969, The Frost: Rock and Roll Music. Vanguard Records.
- 1970, Bill Haley and the Comets: Travelin' Band. Janus Records. Released in Sweden by Sonet Records under the title Rock Around the Country.
- 1971, Skaggmanslaget: Snus, mus och brannvin. Sonet Records.
- 1971, Stefan Grossman: Those Pleasant Days. Transatlantic Records.
- 1971, Misc. Artists: Spellmansstamma i Delsbo. Sonet Records.
- 1972, The Cajuns (Vol. 1 and Vol. 2.). Sonet Records.
- 1972, Peps Persson: The Week Peps Came to Chicago. Sonet Records.
- 1972, Ann Charters: A Joplin Bouquet. (Originally self-released on Portents Records, 1964.) GNP Records.
- 1973, Stefan Grossman: Live. Transatlantic.
- 1974, Peps Blodsband: Peps Blodsband. Sonet Records.
- 1974, Ann Charters: The Genius of Scott Joplin. Sonet Records.
- 1975, African Journey: A Search for the Roots of the Blues. Vanguard Records.
- 1975. Peps Blodsband: Hog Standard. Sonet Records.
- 1975, The Griots: Ministers of the Spoken Word. Ethnic Folkways Library.
- 1976, Rockin' Dopsie and the Cajun Twisters: Doin' the Zydeco. Sonet Records.
- 1977, Jerry Williams and Roadwork: Too Fast to Live Too Young to Die. Sonet Records.
- 1978, African Flute, The Gambia. Folkways Records.
- 1979, Jerry Williams and Roadwork: I Can Jive. Sonet Records.
- 1982, Clifton Chenier and His Red Hot Louisiana Band: I'm Here. Sonet Records.
- 1985, The Klezmer Conservatory Band: A Touch of Klez! Vanguard Records.
- 1990, Dave van Ronk: Hummin' to Myself. Gazell Records.
- 1990, The Fugs: Songs from a Portable Forest. Gazell Records.
- 1998, Bebo Valdes: Recuerdos de Habana. Gazell Records.
