= Barry Melton =

American guitarist (born 1947)

Barry "The Fish" Melton
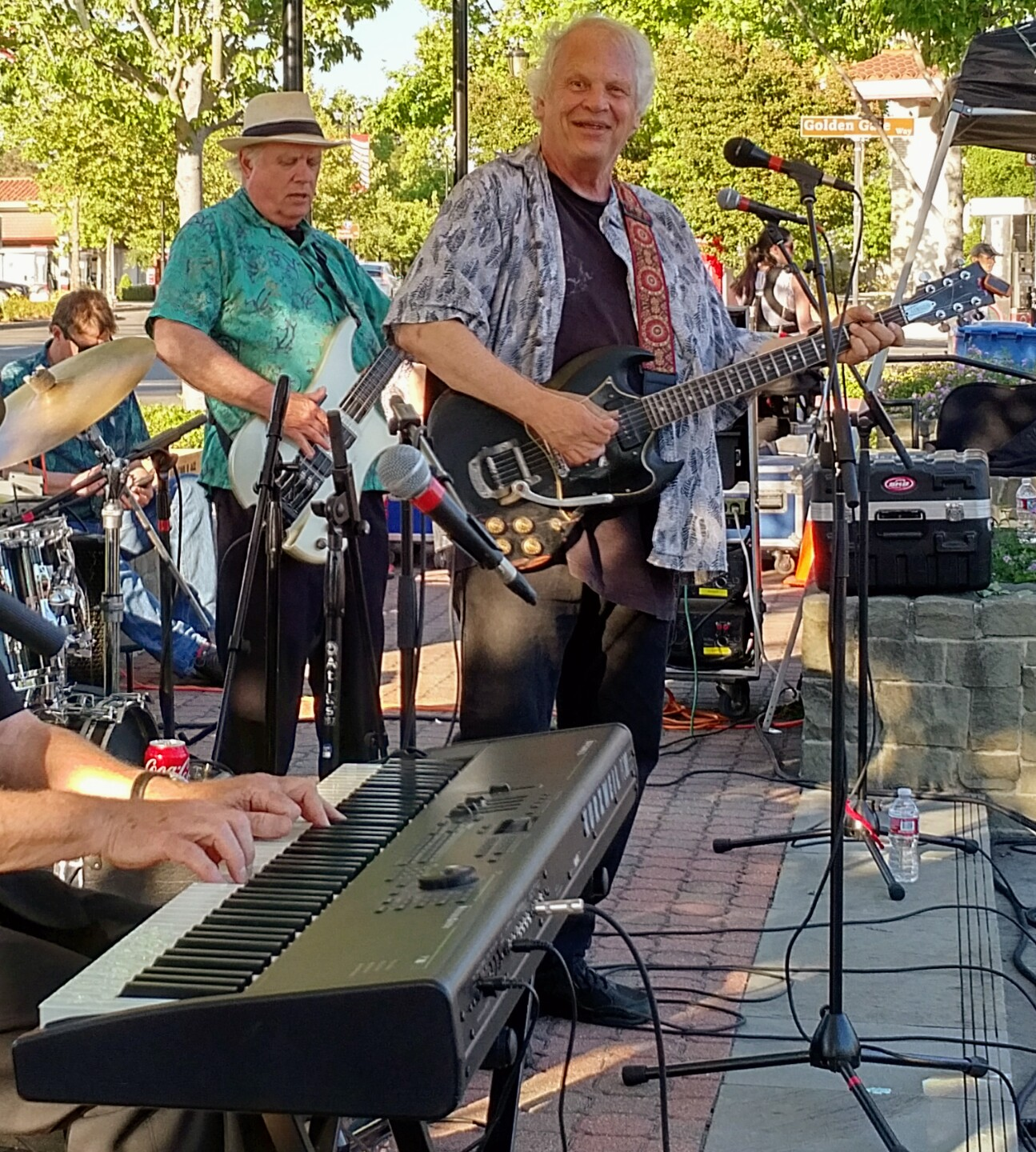
- Melton (right) performing in 2017

Background information
- Also known as: The Fish
- Born: June 14, 1947 (age 79); Brooklyn, New York, United States
- Genres: Rock, psychedelic rock, acid rock
- Occupations: Musician, songwriter, attorney
- Instruments: Guitar; vocals
- Years active: 1965–present
- Website: counterculture.net/thefish

Barry "The Fish" Melton (born June 14, 1947) is an American guitarist and songwriter who is the co-founder and original lead guitarist of rock bands Country Joe and the Fish and Dinosaurs. He appears on all the Country Joe and the Fish recordings and he also wrote some of the songs that the band recorded. He appeared in the films made at Monterey Pop and Woodstock, and also appeared as an outlaw in the neo-Western film Zachariah and other films in which Country Joe and the Fish appear. An attorney and member of the State Bar of California, Melton has maintained a criminal defense practice since 1982.

== Life and career ==
Melton was born in Brooklyn, New York, United States, the son of secretary Taube "Tillie" (née Kuchuck) and James Melton, an HVAC engineer who taught at Los Angeles City College. His mother was from an East Coast Jewish family (her parents were from Odessa) and his father was from a Texas pioneer family and shares ancestry in colonial Virginia with George Washington, as well as deep roots in Ireland.

Raised in Brooklyn's Brighton Beach neighborhood and the San Fernando Valley of Los Angeles, California, Melton served as a Congress of Racial Equality volunteer during Freedom Summer and participated in a demonstration against Trần Lệ Xuân during her September–October 1963 lecture tour of Europe and the United States. Having previously studied under Kay Kyser guitarist Milton Norman for much of his youth at the instigation of his parents, Melton initially befriended future bandmate Bruce Barthol in his high school's folk music club. After ascending to the presidency of that organization, Melton became ensconced in the American folk music revival in earnest, playing at such venues as the Ash Grove. A summer 1964 hitchhiking excursion to the San Francisco Bay Area and his hometown of New York City yielded his first introduction to Joe McDonald at a Malvina Reynolds concert in the Bay Area.

Upon graduating early from Ulysses S. Grant High School in January 1965, Melton enrolled at San Francisco State University after becoming a devotee of faculty member S. I. Hayakawa's writings on general semantics. Dissuaded by the fact that Hayakawa only taught upper-division courses and "lured away by the music", he dropped out after ten weeks, reuniting with McDonald in nearby Berkeley, California; paralleling the development of such contemporaneous groups as the Grateful Dead, various duo and jug band-oriented permutations of their act (centered on the Jabberwock, a Berkeley coffeehouse) would ultimately evolve into Country Joe and the Fish by early 1966.

With a desire to eschew the rigors of a touring lifestyle, while maintaining his countercultural values following the birth of his first son in 1977, he enrolled in the law program at La Salle Extension University, a now-defunct correspondence law school. After earning his Juris Doctor from Ocean University (a similar institution) and passing the California bar exam in 1982, Melton maintained a private criminal defense practice in San Francisco for twelve years before becoming a deputy public defender in Mendocino County, California, in 1994. Following a brief tenure as a California deputy state public defender from 1998 to 1999, he took a position with Yolo County, California, eventually retiring in 2009 as the county's chief public defender. Since then, he has resumed private practice and worked as a subcontractor for Lake Defense, the contract provider of indigent defense services in Lake County, California. He is certified as a specialist in criminal law by the State Bar of California Board of Legal Specialization.

Melton also continues to be active in music. Since 2001, he has performed in Italy, England, France, Thailand and Russia (including a performance with the Russian band Crossroadz in Moscow). He often appears with his own band, mainly around northern California, and generally tours Europe briefly in the summer. Peter Albin of Big Brother and the Holding Company has continued to play with Melton for over 40 years.

Melton appeared as a guest performer with members of The Blues Project Band during the Blue Wing Blues Festival Labor Day Concert closing event on September 1, 2025.

== Discography ==
=== Studio albums ===
- Bright Sun Is Shining (Vanguard, 1970)
- The Fish (United Artists Records, 1975)
- We Are Like the Ocean (Music Is Medicine, 1977)
- Level with Me (Music Is Medicine, 1978)
- Songs of the Next Great Depression (Rag Baby Records, 1981)

=== Collaborative Albums ===
- Melton, Levy & The Dey Bros. (Columbia, 1972)
- Duel in the Desert with Rich Hopkins (Taxim Records, 2007)
- The Revenge of Blind Joe Death: The John Fahey Tribute Album as a member of "Canned Fish", a one-time collaboration between Canned Heat members Adolfo de la Parra ("Fito") and Larry Taylor, and Country Joe and the Fish member Barry "The Fish" Melton. (Takoma Records, distributed by Fantasy Records, 2006). The album was produced by Jon Monday, long-time veteran of Takoma Records, founded by John Fahey. Also appearing on the album: George Winston, Michael Gulezian, Alex de Grassi, Country Joe McDonald, Peter Lang, Stefan Grossman, and Rick Ruskin.

=== As band member ===
With Dinosaurs

- Dinousaurs (Relix Records, 1988)
- Friends of Extinction (Retroworld, 2004) (Compilation Album)

With Jamasutra

- Revolution Down the Road (2010)

With Can't Stop to Boogie

- Can't Stop to Boogie (2011)

=== As guest ===
With Otis Spann

- Cryin' Time (1969, Vanguard)
