= Fugit (disambiguation) =

Fugit may refer to:

- Fugit, a term in mathematical finance
- Fugit Township, Decatur County, Indiana
- Patrick Fugit, an American actor

== See also ==
- Tempus fugit (disambiguation)
