= Time Flies =

Time Flies may refer to:

- Tempus fugit, a Latin phrase usually translated as "time flies"; an admonition against procrastination

== Film ==
- Time Flies (1944 film), a British comedy directed by Walter Forde
- Time Flies (2013 film), a Canadian short drama film directed by Stéphane Moukarzel

== Music ==
- Timeflies, an American pop-rap duo

=== Albums ===
- Time Flies (Billy Ray Cyrus album) or the title song, 2003
- Time Flies (John Michael Montgomery album), 2008
- Time Flies (Ladyhawke album) or the title song, 2021
- Time Flies (Melanie Laine album) or the title song, 2005
- Time Flies (Nogizaka46 album), 2021
- Time Flies (Vaya Con Dios album) or the title song, 1992
- Time Flies... The Best of Huey Lewis & the News, 1996
- Time Flies... 1994–2009, by Oasis, 2010
- Time Flies, by Eason Chan, 2010

=== Songs ===
- "Time Flies" (Drake song), 2020
- "Time Flies" (Porcupine Tree song), 2009
- "Time Flies", by Burna Boy from Twice as Tall, 2020
- "Time Flies", by Lower Than Atlantis from Changing Tune, 2012
- "Time Flies", by Puddle of Mudd from Life on Display, 2003
- "Time Flies", by Raveena from Asha's Awakening, 2022
- "Time Flies", by Rico Nasty, 2019
- "Time Flies", by Weezer from Hurley, 2010

== Other uses ==
- Time Flies (comics), a 1990–1996 comic by Garth Ennis and Philip Bond
- Time Flies (video game), a 2025 video game
- Hawks Miller HM-1, named Time Flies, a 1936 American racing aircraft
- "Time Flies", an episode of the series Ruby Gloom

== See also ==
- Time Flies By, a 2012 album by Country Joe McDonald
- "Time Flies By (When You're the Driver of a Train)", a 1985 song by Half Man Half Biscuit from Back in the DHSS
- "Time flies like an arrow; fruit flies like a banana", a humorous example of syntactic ambiguity
- Tempus fugit (disambiguation)
