= War War War =

Studio album by Country Joe McDonald
- Released: October 1971
- Genre: Rock, pop, country rock
- Length: 42:01
- Label: Vanguard (original release); One Way (reissue)
- Producer: Country Joe McDonald

Country Joe McDonald chronology
Thinking of Woody Guthrie (1969)	War War War (1971)	Incredible! Live (1972)

War War War is the third album by Country Joe McDonald. The lyrics for the songs on the album were based upon the poetry of Robert William Service (January 16, 1874 – September 11, 1958), who was sometimes referred to as "the Bard of the Yukon".

The album was released in October 1971 by Vanguard Records (VSD 79315) and reissued in February 1995 by One Way Records (OW 30995). Recording took place in Vanguard Studios located in New York City.

Because the album has been out of print for many years, Country Joe McDonald released a live album with the same track listing in 2007 called War War War Live.

McDonald performed "Jean Deprez" on the BBC in 1971. McDonald had put the poem to music years before he formed Country Joe and the Fish, and has said that it took him six years to be able to sing the song, about a young boy who tried to save a wounded French soldier, without crying.

== Reception ==
Professional ratings
Review scores
Source	Rating
AllMusic	3/5 stars

The album reached number 185 on the 1971 Billboard pop albums chart in 1971.

== Track listing ==
All tracks composed by Joe McDonald from the poems of Robert W. Service

No.	Title	Length
1.	"Forward"	4:39
2.	"The Call"	2:35
3.	"Young Fellow, My Lad"	3:47
4.	"The Man from Athabaska "	6:28
5.	"The Munition Maker"	4:22
6.	"The Twins"	1:53
7.	"Jean Desprez"	9:48
8.	"War Widow"	2:02
9.	"The March of the Dead"	6:27

== Personnel ==
- Country Joe McDonald - vocals, guitar, harmonica, tambourine, organ, vocal harmony, footstomping.

Production

- Producer - Country Joe McDonald
- Engineer - Captain Jeff Zaraya
