= Woodstock Reunion 1979 =

Woodstock Reunion 1979 was a concert on September 8, 1979, at Parr Meadows racetrack in the hamlet of Yaphank in the town of Brookhaven, Suffolk County, Long Island, New York. It had an audience of about 18,000 to 40,000 (reports vary) and was organized for the 10th anniversary of the original Woodstock Festival, by concert promoter Richard Nader. It was one of several Woodstock reunion events that year.

Performers included Paul Butterfield and Rick Danko, Canned Heat, Richie Havens, Jorma Kaukonen, Country Joe McDonald, John Sebastian, Michael Shrieve, Stephen Stills, Leslie West, and Johnny Winter.

This reunion concert faced organizational difficulties, much like the original Woodstock, though on a far smaller scale. On Friday the 7th, the day before the show, over 1000 young people showed up and camped out at the site; prompting complaints from neighbors. The next day there was a delay in opening the venue gates, due to security concerns by the concert-promoter; which almost resulted in a revocation of the permit and cancellation of the show by local officials.

Recordings of the concert were broadcast on the King Biscuit Flower Hour. A bootleg CD titled Live at Parr Meadows also exists.

== See also ==
- Woodstock '79 — a concert at Madison Square Garden in New York City
