= Harper Simon =

American singer-songwriter (born 1972)

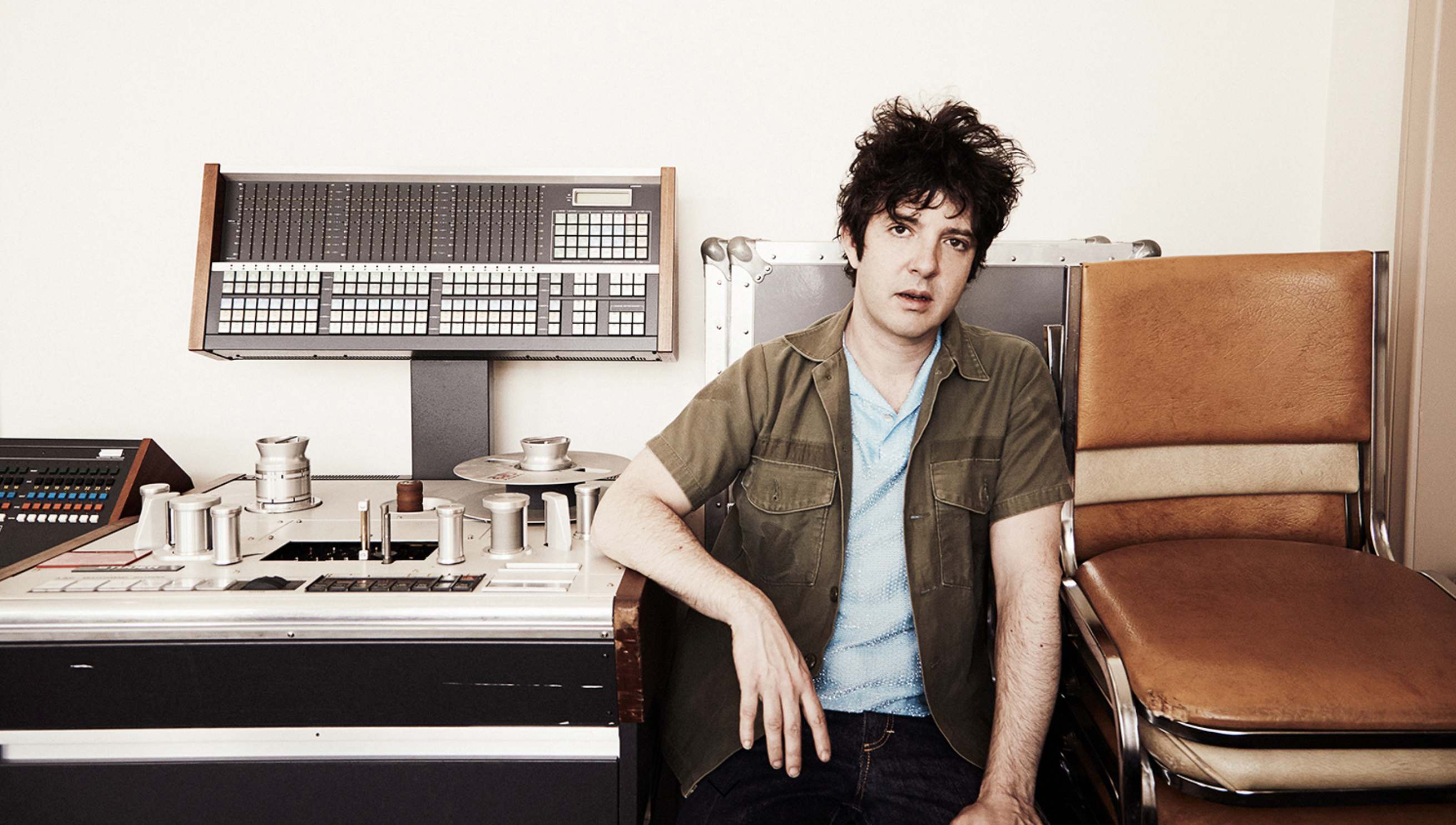
- Simon in 2007
- Born: Harper James Simon; September 7, 1972 (age 54); New York, United States
- Parent(s): Paul Simon, Peggy Harper
- Musical career
- Genres: Indie rock, folk rock, psychedelic rock
- Occupations: Singer-songwriter, music producer, guitarist
- Instrument: Guitar
- Years active: 1996–present
- Labels: Tulsi Records, PIAS Recordings

Harper James Simon (born September 7, 1972) is an American singer-songwriter, musician, writer and film producer.

The son of Paul Simon and Peggy Harper, Simon has released several studio albums, his music has been featured in film & TV shows, including HBO's Girls. As a musical guest he has appeared on The Tonight Show with Jay Leno, Late Night with David Letterman, Jimmy Kimmel Live, and Late Night with Jimmy Fallon, and he has been featured in Rolling Stone, Paper, Mojo, Uncut, Clash, The Independent, and The Times (London).

As an author, his works include Thinking Out Loud (2026) and Meditations on Crime (2022). He has interviewed cultural and political figures and contributed to Los Angeles Review of Books, Purple, Issue, Air Mail, and Hesperios Journal. He is an executive producer of Alex Ross Perry's documentary Pavements, about indie-rock band Pavement. He currently sits on the board of Waterkeeper Alliance and The Sanders Institute.

== Early life and career ==
Harper James Simon grew up in New York City as the eldest son of musician Paul Simon and his first wife, Peggy Harper. He was also raised by his stepmother, the late actress and writer Carrie Fisher. Growing up, Simon made appearances in film and TV shows, including Sesame Street where he sang "Bingo" with his father in a segment that demonstrated how a record is made. He also appeared on Lorne Michaels' The New Show and Saturday Night Live in the 1980s. Many of Paul Simon's lyrics include references to the younger Simon, most notably "St. Judy's Comet," "Slip Slidin' Away" and "Graceland". His mother, Peggy, is the "silver girl" referred to in "Bridge Over Troubled Water". The 1980 feature film One Trick Pony is loosely based on the relationships between Paul, Peggy and Harper.

After high school, Simon attended Berklee College of Music. In the 1990s, Simon played the New York club circuit as a solo artist and with bands. He contributed music to two films by Abel Ferrara, New Rose Hotel and The Blackout. He played guitar on Carl Perkins's final album Go Cat Go!, which was recorded at Sun Studios in Memphis, Tennessee. As an actor, he made cameo appearances in New Rose Hotel, as well as in Martin Scorsese's Bringing Out The Dead.

== Solo albums and collaborations ==
In 2010, Simon released his self-titled debut, which he co-produced with legendary producer Bob Johnston (Bob Dylan, Leonard Cohen, Johnny Cash). The album featured members of the original "Nashville A-Team" including: Charlie McCoy, Fred Carter Jr., Hargus "Pig" Robbins, and Lloyd Green, as well as Steve Nieve (Elvis Costello & The Attractions), Yuka Honda (Cibo Matto), Petra Haden and Marc Ribot.

In 2013, he released Division Street, which he co-produced with Tom Rothrock, best known for his work with Elliott Smith and Beck. The album featured such musicians as: Pete Thomas (Elvis Costello), Nikolai Fraiture (The Strokes), Nate Walcott (Bright Eyes), Mikael Jorgensen (Wilco).

In 2022, he released Meditations on Crime, with musical collaborations from artists such as Julia Holter, King Khan, Gang Gang Dance, Money Mark and the Sun Ra Arkestra. Meditations on Crime was a companion album to his multimedia art project of the same name.

Under the name Butterfly, he and Vincent Gallo released The Music of Butterfly (2025), in a limited edition run of 3,000 copies on vinyl only. The album was produced, engineered, mixed and mastered by Gallo, who also hand-assembled the album artwork.

In 2017, Simon played guitar on Lady Gaga's title track for her album Joanne, produced by Mark Ronson.

== Appearances ==
Simon has played many festivals including Bonnaroo, SXSW, Port Elliot, Cambridge Folk Festival, and Festival au Désert in Mali (where he performed with Tinariwen). He has opened for acts such as Kris Kristofferson, Marianne Faithfull, Fleet Foxes, and Brian Wilson.

In 2008, Simon performed at Blackout Sabbath, concert curated by Rufus Wainwright, alongside Beth Orton, Martha Wainwright, and Joan As Police Woman. He also performed as part of a Joe Boyd produced tribute to Nick Drake that was broadcast on the BBC in 2013. Others on the bill included Stuart Murdoch from Belle and Sebastian, Blur's Graham Coxon, and Vashti Bunyan.

He has performed on many occasions, as guitarist for Yoko Ono's Plastic Ono Band, including headlining ArthurFest and All Tomorrow's Parties, both in 2005. In 2012, he reunited with the Plastic Ono Band, as a featured guest at The Brooklyn Academy of Music, L.A.'s Orpheum Theater, and San Francisco's Fox Theater—where he shared the bill with Iggy Pop, RZA, Thurston Moore, Kim Gordon, Eric Clapton and Perry Farrell, among others. He also played guitar on Sean Lennon's album Friendly Fire, and appeared in the film by the same name. He accompanied Lennon on the road opening for Regina Spektor and the Strokes.

Simon has performed with various members of the Grateful Dead. In 2010, he performed with Bob Weir at the benefit for Rainforest Action Network. In 2012, he performed at the Jerry Garcia 70th birthday tribute along with Bob Weir, Cass McCombs, and members of Vampire Weekend. In 2013, he shared the bill with the Grateful Dead's Phil Lesh at a benefit for Rainforest Action Network. In 2018, along with Weir, Jerry Harrison and others he performed at the memorial for Grateful Dead lyricist John Perry Barlow at San Francisco's Fillmore Auditorium.

Simon worked with producer Hal Willner on two occasions. In 2016, he performed for a two-week run at the Adelaide Festival in Eric Mingus' re-imagining of The Who's Tommy, which Willner produced. In 2018, he performed in The Bells, a tribute to Lou Reed at the Lincoln Center. which was produced by Willner and Laurie Anderson.

In 2016, Simon produced a 30th Anniversary concert event for the film Repo Man, along with Steve Hanft at LA's The Regency Theater. The event consisted of a screening of the film and concert which, for which he served as musical director, featuring Fear's Lee Ving, Luna's Dean Wareham, and Harry Dean Stanton.

Simon also produced a benefit concert for the film non-profit Vidiots, honoring Harry Dean Stanton. The Harry Dean Stanton Award was held at The Theatre at the Ace Hotel in Los Angeles in 2017. Simon acted as musical director and performed alongside Karen O, Father John Misty, Inara George, John C. Reilly, Kris Kristofferson, and Harry Dean Stanton accompanied by Mariachi Los Reyes. The award was presented by director David Lynch.

In 2018, Simon performed at Bobby Kennedy Jr.'s Waterkeeper Alliance benefit as a duo with John C. Reilly, along with performances by Sarah Silverman, Kevin Nealon, and Larry David.

Simon has presented several films in Los Angeles, conducting Q&A's, serving as a panel moderator. In 2014, at Cinefamily, he presented the unreleased cult film Nothing Lasts Forever and interviewed the director, original SNL writer Tom Schiller, and interviewed Buck Henry following the presentation of Miloš Forman's Taking Off in 2016. He was the panel moderator at the screenings of Jimi Hendrix and Monterey Pop presented by Cinespia at the Hollywood Forever Cemetery in 2015. Simon presented John Waters' Female Trouble with Fred Armisen for American Cinematheque, the two appeared in conversation following the screening.

== Journalism and books ==
Simon has conducted many interviews for publications, as well as for Lip TV's Talk Show, which ran from 2016 to 2017. His Talk Show interview subjects include former CIA director James Woolsey, former senator Al Franken, actresses Natasha Lyonne and Anjelica Huston, directors Sean Baker and Sam Taylor-Johnson, artists Ed Moses and Alex Israel, Devo's Mark Mothersbaugh, Pink Floyd's David Gilmour, Monty Python's Eric Idle, and others. He interviewed artist Tracey Emin for Purple Magazine, virtual reality pioneer and author Jaron Lanier for the Los Angeles Review of Books and director Miranda July for Hesperios Journal in 2019.

In 2026, Simon released Thinking Out Loud, a book of his interviews. It was the follow-up to his 2022 book/multimedia project Meditations on Crime, which featured essays from artists and writers like Miranda July, Ben Okri, Jerry Stahl, MC5's Wayne Kramer and visual art by the likes of Raymond Pettibon, Cindy Sherman, and Tracey Emin. The project included a companion record, featuring original music by Sun Ra Arkestra, Gang Gang Dance, Julia Holter, and others.

== Personal life ==
Harper Simon has been linked to actress Parker Posey.

== Film and television ==
Simon was an executive producer on Alex Ross Perry's documentary Pavements, about the 90s rock band Pavement.

Songs from Simon's first album were featured in the Golden Globe-winning HBO show Girls, ABC shows Private Practice and The Neighbors, and in the film Peace, Love and Misunderstanding directed by Oscar-winner Bruce Beresford.

In 2018, Simon played Bram Stoker in an episode of Drunk History.

== Film and television credits ==
- Girls (HBO)
- Private Practice (ABC)
- The Neighbors (ABC)
- The Blackout (dir: Abel Ferrara)
- New Rose Hotel (dir: Abel Ferrara)
- Peace, Love and Misunderstanding (dir: Bruce Beresford)

== Musical performances on television ==
- The Late Show with David Letterman
- Late Night with Jimmy Fallon
- Jimmy Kimmel Live!
- Nick Drake Tribute (BBC)
- Taratata (France)

== Film and television cameos ==
- Sesame Street (1976)
- One Trick Pony (dir: Robert M. Young) (1980)
- The New Show (1984)
- Saturday Night Live (1988)
- New Rose Hotel (dir: Abel Ferrara) (1998)
- Bringing Out the Dead (dir: Martin Scorsese) (1999)
- Drunk History (2018)

== Selected discography ==
=== Solo albums ===
- Harper Simon (2010)
- Division Street (2013)
- Meditation on Crime (2022)

=== Other albums ===
- Carl Perkins, Go Cat Go! (1996)
- The Blackout (Soundtrack) (1997)
- Sean Lennon, Friendly Fire (2006)
- Suphala, Blueprint (2006)
- Song of America compilation (2007)
- The Heavy Circles, The Heavy Circles (2008)
- Daniel Merriwether, Love & War (2009)
- Soko, I Thought I Was an Alien (2012)
- Country Joe McDonald, Time Flies By (2012)
- Girls (Soundtrack) (2013)
- Steve Nieve, ToGetHer (2013)
- Lady Gaga, Joanne (2018)
- Butterfly, The Music of Butterfly (2025)
