= Superstitious Blues =

Studio album by Country Joe McDonald
- Released: 1991
- Studio: Fantasy, Berkeley, California
- Genre: Country folk, folk blues
- Label: Rykodisc

Country Joe McDonald chronology
| Best of Country Joe McDonald: The Vanguard Years (1969–1975) (1990) | Superstitious Blues (1991) | Carry On (1995) |

Superstitious Blues is an album by the American musician Country Joe McDonald, released in 1991. Although McDonald had played then-recent anti-Gulf War rallies, the album is made up of personal, not political, songs. McDonald considered making Superstitious Blues his final album; it was his first album in 12 years to be distributed by a label other than his own.

== Production ==
Jerry Garcia played guitar on the album; Sandy Rothman contributed dobro. "Eunecita" was written in 1971, but remained unrecorded for almost two decades. "Clara Barton" is a tribute to the founder of the American Red Cross; "Blues for Michael" is about Mike Bloomfield. McDonald was supposed to sing at the 1991 American Red Cross annual convention, but was uninvited due to his Gulf War protest. McDonald, in contrast to some of his peers, was happy to employ digital recording during the making of the album.

== Critical reception ==
Professional ratings
Review scores
| Source | Rating |
|---|---|
| AllMusic | 3/5 stars |
| Entertainment Weekly | C |
| MusicHound Rock: The Essential Album Guide | 3/5 stars |
| The State | 4/4 stars |

Entertainment Weekly called the album "both uneven and surprising," but acknowledged that the McDonald-Garcia "guitar team-up on the pretty country-folk tune 'Standing at the Crossroads' is a blissful pleasure." The Boston Globe wrote that, "in backing McDonald, [Garcia] returns to fluid acoustic musings that evoke the Dead's American Beauty and Workingman's Dead."

The Sun Sentinel determined that "the shift from broader politics to personal themes reflects McDonald's maturation both as an artist and an activist." The Philadelphia Inquirer called the album "poignant, pretty and powerful, yet almost understated... Its songs range from the moody, moderately psychedelic instrumental 'Tranquility' to 'Standing at the Crossroads', a country waltz." The State concluded that "the beauty of this disc is its simplicity ... McDonald combines those old bay area psychedelic sentiments with deep-rooted blues."

AllMusic deemed it "an excellent comeback album."

== Track listing ==
All tracks are written by Joe McDonald.

| No. | Title | Length |
|---|---|---|
| 1. | "Standing at the Crossroads" | 4:21 |
| 2. | "Eunecita" | 4:11 |
| 3. | "Superstitious Blues" | 3:48 |
| 4. | "Tranquility" | 3:34 |
| 5. | "Starship Ride" | 3:06 |
| 6. | "Cocaine (Rock)" | 3:46 |
| 7. | "Blues for Breakfast" | 3:35 |
| 8. | "Clara Barton" | 3:34 |
| 9. | "Blues for Michael" | 6:48 |
