= Lancieux =

Lancieux Lanseeg
- Commune
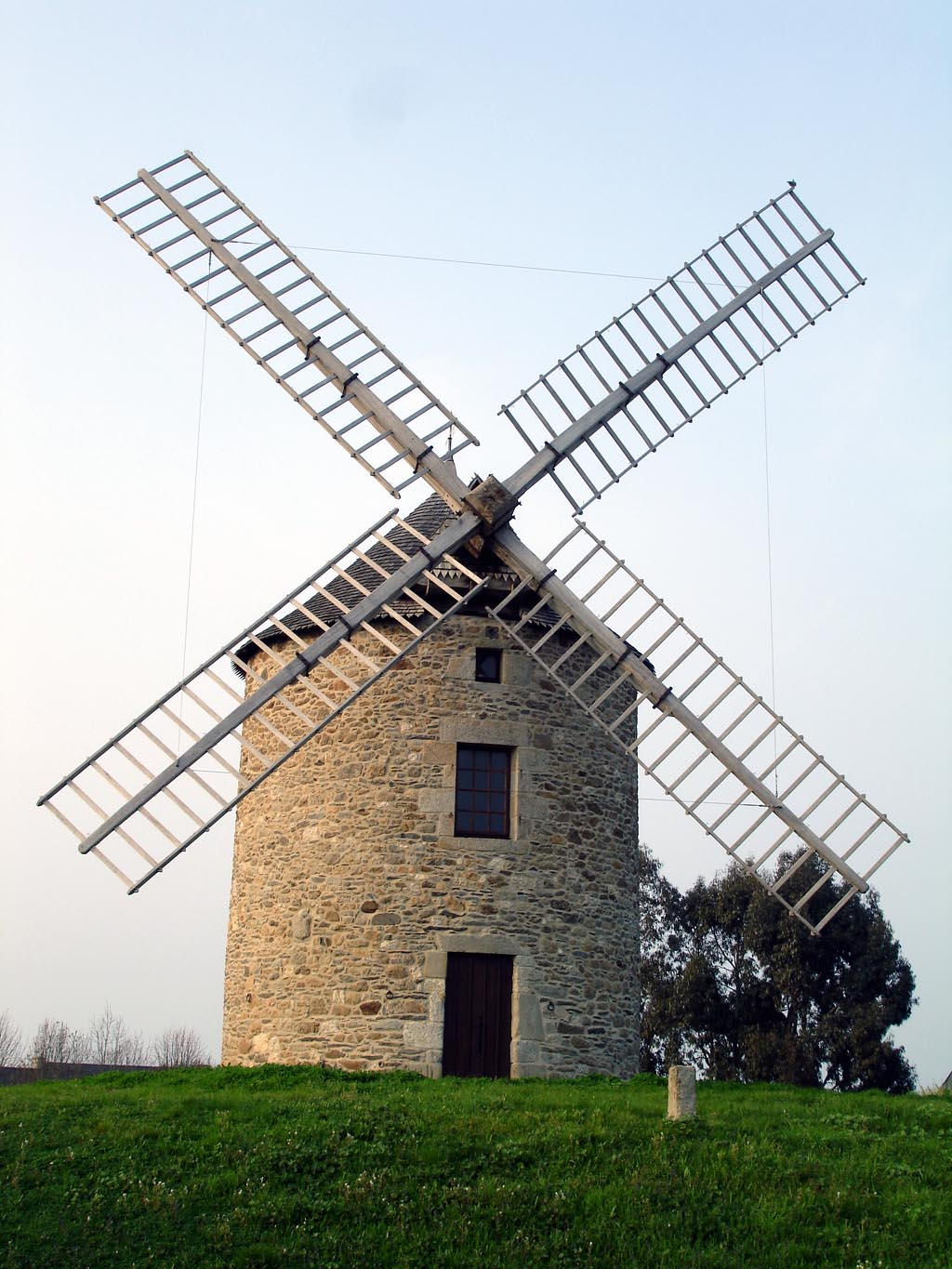
- The windmill in Lancieux

- Coat of arms
- Location of Lancieux
- Location within France Location within Brittany
- Coordinates: 48°36′30″N 2°08′55″W
- Country: France
- Region: Brittany
- Department: Côtes-d'Armor
- Arrondissement: Dinan
- Canton: Pleslin-Trigavou
- Intercommunality: Côte d'Émeraude

Government
  - Mayor (2020–2026): Delphine Briand
- Area^{1}: 6.69 km^{2} (2.58 sq mi)
- Highest elevation: 47 m (154 ft)
- Lowest elevation: 0 m (0 ft)
- Population (2023): 1,611
  - Density: 241/km^{2} (624/sq mi)
- Time zone: UTC+01:00 (CET)
  - Summer (DST): UTC+02:00 (CEST)
- INSEE/Postal code: 22094 /22770
- ^{1} French Land Register data, which excludes lakes, ponds, glaciers > 1 km^{2} (0.386 sq mi or 247 acres) and river estuaries.

Lancieux (French pronunciation: [lɑ̃sjø]; Breton: Lanseeg; Gallo: Lansioec) is a commune in the Côtes-d'Armor department of Brittany in northwestern France.

== Toponymy ==
Lancieux derives its name from the Breton lann ("hermitage") and Seoc, Cieux, or Sieu, a monk who came from British Cornwall at the end of the 6th century AD; therefore it can be translated as "the hermitage of Seoc".

== Population ==
Historical population
Year	Pop.	±% p.a.
1968	1,214	—
1975	1,084	−1.61%
1982	1,156	+0.92%
1990	1,245	+0.93%
1999	1,220	−0.23%
2007	1,371	+1.47%
2012	1,512	+1.98%
2017	1,510	−0.03%
2023	1,611	+1.08%
Source: INSEE

Inhabitants of Lancieux are called lancieutins or lancieutains in French.

== Personalities ==
The British-Canadian poet and writer Robert W. Service, known as the "Bard of the Yukon", used to spend summers in Lancieux from 1913 until his death in 1958. He had a deep affection for the town and its scenic seaside. On many occasions, he made monetary gifts to the town, including for the school and the war memorial. Service is buried in the town cemetery.

The town of Lancieux has paid homage to the memory of Robert W. Service. One of its streets has been called Robert Service Street. A few years later, on May 18, 2002 the school of Lancieux took the name of "École Robert W. Service". Since 2000, Lancieux and Whitehorse, Yukon are sister cities.

== See also ==
- Communes of the Côtes-d'Armor department
