= Country Joe (album) =

Studio album by Country Joe McDonald
- Released: 1975
- Studio: Vanguard 23rd Street Studios, New York City
- Genre: Rock
- Length: 41:31
- Label: Vanguard
- Producer: Maynard Solomon

Country Joe McDonald chronology
Paris Sessions (1972)	Country Joe (1975)	Love is a Fire (1976)

Professional ratings
Review scores
Source	Rating
Allmusic	4.5/5 stars

Country Joe was the seventh album by Country Joe McDonald, released in 1975. It was reissued on CD in 1996 on the One Way Records label. The album includes a recording of Jesse James, which McDonald co-wrote with Barry Melton and Grateful Dead lyricist Robert Hunter.

== Track listing ==
All tracks composed by Joe McDonald; except where indicated

1. "Dr. Hip" – 3:46
2. "Old Joe Corey" – 3:05
3. "Making Money in Chile" – 3:11
4. "You Messed over Me" – 5:02
5. "Memories" – 6:50
6. "Chile" – 4:33
7. "Pleasin'" – 4:12
8. "Jesse James" (Barry Melton, Robert Hunter) – 3:49
9. "Satisfactory" – 4:09
10. "It's Finally Over" – 2:54

== Personnel ==
- Country Joe McDonald – vocals, guitar, kazoo, harmonica
- Charlie Brown – electric guitar
- Sam T. Brown – guitar
- Sal DiTroia – guitar
- Gary Chester – drums
- Frank Owens – piano
- Joe Macho – bass
- Gail Nelson, Hilda Harris, Maeretha Stewart – backing vocals
- George Butcher – string and horn arrangements

Technical

- David Baker, Jeff Zaraya – engineer
- Steve Prezant – photography
