= Robert W. Service =

British-Canadian poet and writer (1874–1958)

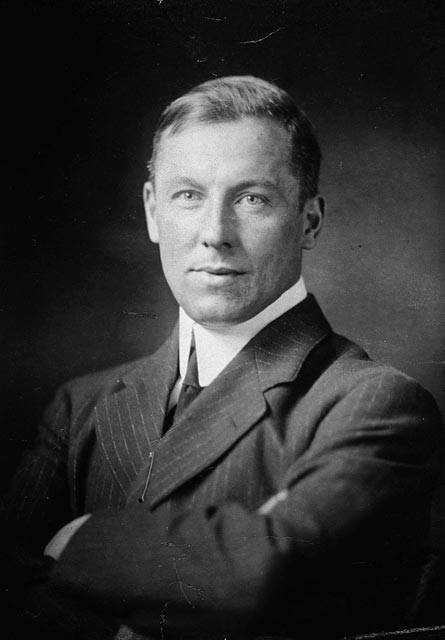
- Service c. 1905
- Born: Robert William Service; 16 January 1874; Preston, Lancashire, England
- Died: 11 September 1958 (aged 84); Lancieux, Côtes-d'Armor, France
- Resting place: Lancieux, Côtes-d'Armor
- Education: University of Glasgow, and McGill University
- Occupations: Writer, poet, Canadian Great North adventurer
- Spouse: Germaine Bourgoin
- Children: 2
- Writing career
- Genres: Poetry, Novel
- Notable works: Songs of a Sourdough, Rhymes of a Red Cross Man, The Trail of '98

Robert William Service (16 January 1874 – 11 September 1958) was an English-born Canadian poet and writer, often called “The Bard of the Yukon" and "The Canadian Kipling". Born in Lancashire of Scottish descent, he was a bank clerk by trade, but spent long periods travelling in the west in the United States and Canada, often in poverty. When his bank sent him to the Yukon, he was inspired by tales of the Klondike Gold Rush, and wrote two poems, "The Shooting of Dan McGrew" and "The Cremation of Sam McGee", which showed remarkable authenticity from an author with no experience of the gold rush or mining, and enjoyed immediate popularity. Encouraged by this, he quickly wrote more poems on the same theme, which were published as Songs of a Sourdough (re-titled The Spell of the Yukon and Other Verses in the U.S.), and achieved a massive sale. When his next collection, Ballads of a Cheechako, proved equally successful, Service could afford to travel widely and live a leisurely life, basing himself in Paris and the French Riviera.

Partly because of their popularity, and the speed with which he wrote them, his works were dismissed as doggerel by the critics, who tended to say the same of Rudyard Kipling, with whom Service was often compared. This did not worry Service, who was happy to classify his work as "verse, not poetry."

== Life ==
=== Early life ===
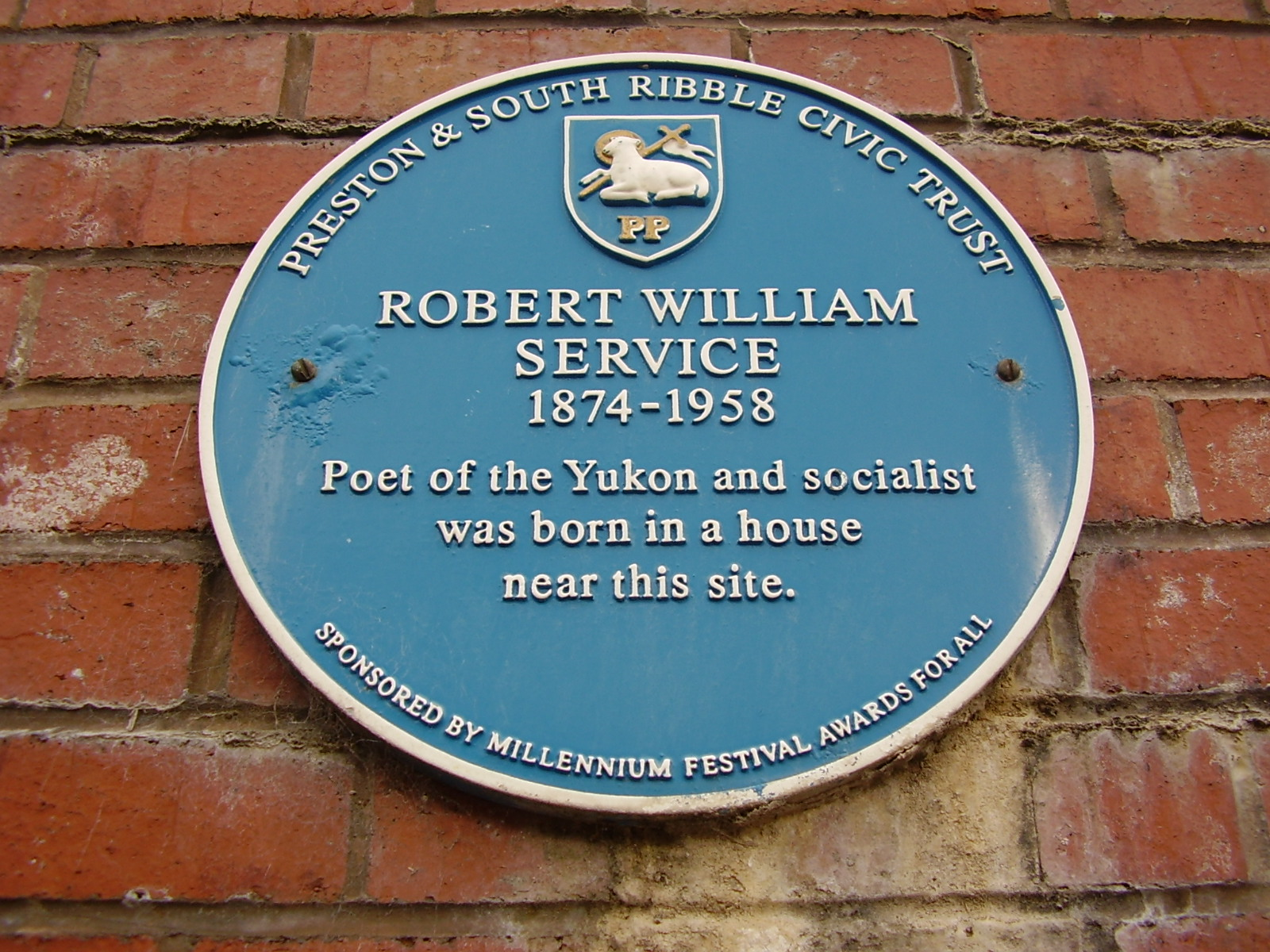
Commemorative Plaque in Preston, England

Robert William Service was born in Preston, Lancashire, England, the third of ten children. His father, also Robert Service, was a banker from Kilwinning, Scotland, who had been transferred to England. Service's second name, "William", was in honour of a rich uncle; after that uncle neglected to provide for him in his will, Service dropped the middle name.

When he was five, Service was sent to live in Kilwinning with his three maiden aunts and his paternal grandfather, the town's postmaster. There he is said to have composed his first verse, a grace, on his sixth birthday: At nine, Service re-joined his parents who had moved to Glasgow. He attended Glasgow's Hillhead High School. After leaving school, Service joined the Commercial Bank of Scotland which would later become the Royal Bank of Scotland. He was writing at this time and reportedly already "selling his verses". He was also reading poetry: Browning, Keats, Tennyson, and Thackeray.

=== Early career ===
When he was 21, Service travelled to Vancouver Island, British Columbia, with his Buffalo Bill outfit and dreams of becoming a cowboy. He drifted around western North America, "wandering from California to British Columbia," taking and quitting a series of jobs: "Starving in Mexico, residing in a California bordello, farming on Vancouver Island and pursuing unrequited love in Vancouver."

In 1899, when Service was a store clerk in Cowichan Bay, British Columbia, he mentioned to a customer that he wrote verses. The customer was Charles H. Gibbons, editor of the Victoria Daily Colonist, who invited Service to submit his work. By July 1900, six poems by "R.S." on the Boer Wars had appeared in the Colonist – including "The March of the Dead", which would later appear in his first book. (Service's brother, Alick, was a prisoner of the Boers at the time, fighting, specifically, in the Second Boer War. He had been captured on 15 November 1899, alongside Winston Churchill.)

The Colonist also published Service's "Music in the Bush" on 18 September 1901, and "The Little Old Log Cabin" on 16 March 1902.

In her 2006 biography, Under the Spell of the Yukon, Enid Mallory revealed that Service had fallen in love during this period. He was working as a "farm labourer and store clerk when he first met Constance MacLean at a dance in Duncan B.C., where she was visiting her uncle." MacLean lived in Vancouver, on the mainland, so he courted her by mail. Though he was smitten, "MacLean was looking for a man of education and means to support her" so was not that interested. To please her, he took courses at McGill University's Victoria College, but failed.

In 1903, down on his luck, Service was hired by a Canadian Bank of Commerce branch in Victoria, British Columbia, using his Commercial Bank letter of reference. The bank "watched him, gave him a raise, and sent him to Kamloops in the middle of British Columbia. In Victoria, he lived over the bank with a hired piano, and dressed for dinner. In Kamloops, horse country, he played polo. In the fall of 1904, the bank sent him to their Whitehorse branch in Yukon. With the expense money, he bought himself a raccoon coat."

Throughout this period, Service continued writing and saving his verses: "more than a third of the poems in his first volume had been written before he moved north in 1904."

=== Yukon period ===
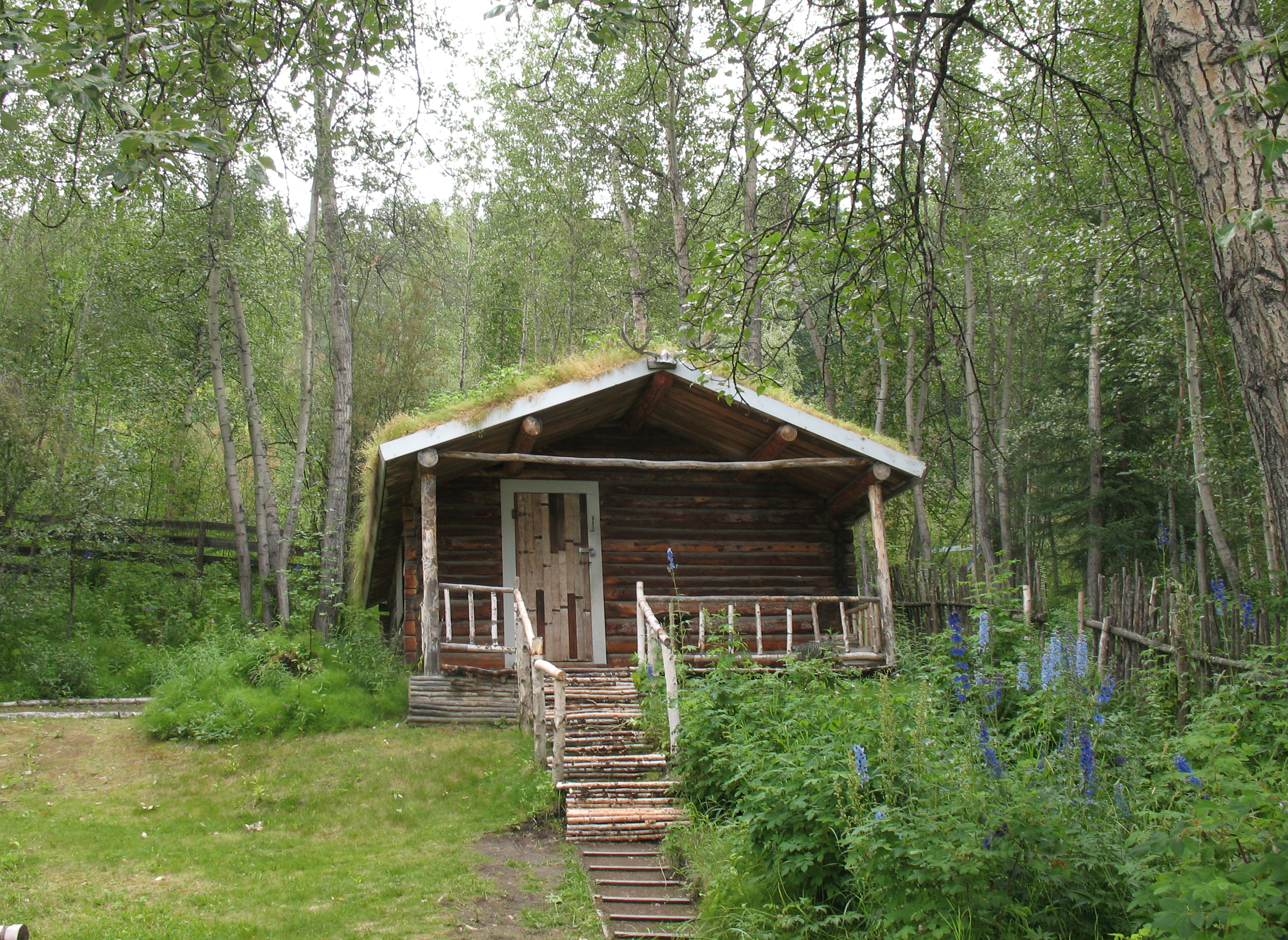
Cabin of Robert Service in Dawson City, Yukon

Whitehorse was a frontier town, less than ten years old. Located on the Yukon River at the White Horse Rapids, it had begun in 1897 as a campground for prospectors on their way to Dawson City to join the Klondike Gold Rush. The railway that Service rode in on, the White Pass and Yukon Route, had reached Whitehorse only in 1900.

Settling in, "Service dreamed and listened to the stories of the great gold rush." He also "took part in the extremely active Whitehorse social life. As was popular at the time he recited at concerts – things such as 'Casey at the Bat' and 'Gunga Din', but they were getting stale."

One day (Service later wrote), while pondering what to recite at an upcoming church concert he met E. J. "Stroller" White, editor of the Whitehorse Star. White suggested: "Why don’t you write a poem for it? Give us something about our own bit of earth. We sure would appreciate it. There’s a rich paystreak waiting for someone to work. Why don’t you go in and stake it?"

Returning from a walk one Saturday night, Service heard the sounds of revelry from a saloon, and the phrase "A bunch of the boys were whooping it up" popped into his head. Inspired, he ran to the bank to write it down (almost being shot as a burglar), and by the next morning "The Shooting of Dan McGrew" was complete.

"A month or so later he heard a gold rush yarn from a Dawson mining man about a fellow who cremated his pal." He spent the night walking in the woods composing "The Cremation of Sam McGee", and wrote it down from memory the next day.

Other verses quickly followed. "In the early spring he stood above the heights of Miles Canyon... the line 'I have gazed on naked grandeur where there’s nothing else to gaze on' came into his mind and again he hammered out a complete poem, "The Call of the Wild". Conversations with locals led Service to write about things he had not seen (some of which had not even happened) as well. He did not set foot in Dawson City until 1908, arriving in the Klondike ten years after the Gold Rush when his renown as a writer was already established. After having collected enough poems for a book, Service "sent the poems to his father, who had emigrated to Toronto, and asked him to find a printing house so they could make it into a booklet. He enclosed a cheque to cover the costs and intended to give these booklets away to his friends in Whitehorse" for Christmas. His father took the manuscript to William Briggs in Toronto, whose employees loved the book. "The foreman and printers recited the ballads while they worked. A salesman read the proofs out loud as they came off the typesetting machines." An "enterprising salesman sold 1700 copies in advance orders from galley proofs." The publisher "sent Robert's cheque back to him and offered a ten percent royalty contract for the book."

Service's book, Songs of a Sourdough, given the more Jack London-ish title, The Spell of the Yukon and Other Verses in the United States, was "an immediate success." It went through seven printings even before its official release date. Ultimately, Briggs "sold fifteen impressions in 1907. That same year there was an edition in New York, Philadelphia, and London. The London publisher, T. Fisher Unwin, struck a twenty-third printing in 1910, and thirteen more by 1917." "Service eventually earned in excess of $100,000 for Songs of a Sourdough alone" (equal to about $3.5 million today after inflation).

"When copies of the book reached Whitehorse, Robert's own minister took him aside to let him know how wicked were his stories. Service hung his head in shame... But, that summer, tourists from the south arrived in Whitehorse looking for the famous poet; and he autographed many of his books."

"In 1908, after working for the bank for three years in Whitehorse, he was sent outside on mandatory paid leave for three months, a standard practice for bank employees serving in the Yukon." According to Enid Mallory, he went to Vancouver and looked up Constance MacLean. Now that he was a successful author, she agreed to become engaged to him.

Following his leave, in 1908 the bank transferred Service to Dawson, where he met veterans of the Gold Rush, now ten years in the past: "they loved to reminisce, and Robert listened carefully and remembered." He used their tales to write a second book of verse, Ballads of a Cheechako, in 1908. "It too was an overwhelming success."

In 1909, when the bank wanted Service to return to Whitehorse as manager, he decided to resign. "After quitting his job, he rented a small two-room cabin on Eighth Avenue in Dawson City from Mrs. Edna Clarke and began his career as a full-time author." He immediately "went to work on his novel.... He went for walks that lasted all night, slept till mid-afternoon, and sometimes didn't come out of the cabin for days. In five months the novel, entitled The Trail of '98, was complete and he took it to a publisher in New York." Service's first novel also "immediately became a best-seller."

Newly wealthy, Service was able to travel to Paris, the French Riviera, Hollywood, and beyond. He returned to Dawson City in 1912 to write his third book of poetry, Rhymes of a Rolling Stone (1912). During that time he became a freemason, being initiated into Yukon Lodge No. 45 in Dawson.

It is unclear what happened between Service and Constance MacLean as no known letters between them exist after Service's departure for Dawson City. In 1912 she "married Leroy Grant, a surveyor and railroad engineer based in Prince Rupert."

=== Later life ===
Service left Dawson City for good in 1912. From 1912 to 1913 he was a correspondent for the Toronto Star during the Balkan Wars.

In 1913, Service moved to Paris, remaining there for the next 15 years. He settled in the Latin Quarter, posing as a painter. In June 1913, he married Parisienne Germaine Bourgoin, daughter of a distillery owner, and they purchased a summer home at Lancieux, Côtes-d'Armor, in the Brittany region of France. They had twin girls, born in January 1917, but one died of scarlet fever in February 1918. Thirteen years younger than her husband, Germaine Service survived him by 31 years, dying aged 102 on 26 December 1989 in Monte Carlo, Monaco.

Service was 40 when World War I broke out; he attempted to enlist, but was turned down "due to varicose veins." He briefly covered the war for the Toronto Star (from 11 December 1915, through 29 January 1916), but "was arrested and nearly executed in an outbreak of spy hysteria in Dunkirk." He then "worked as a stretcher bearer and ambulance driver with the Ambulance Corps of the American Red Cross, until his health broke." Convalescing in Paris, he wrote a new book of mainly war poetry, Rhymes of a Red Cross Man, in 1916. The book was dedicated to the memory of Service's "brother, Lieutenant Albert Service, Canadian Infantry, Killed in Action, France, August 1916." Robert Service received three medals for his war service: 1914–15 Star, British War Medal and the Victory Medal.

With the end of the war, Service "settled down to being a rich man in Paris.... During the day he would promenade in the best suits, with a monocle. At night he went out in old clothes with the company of his doorman, a retired policeman, to visit the lowest dives of the city". During his time in Paris he was reputedly the wealthiest author living in the city, yet was known to dress as a working man and walk the streets, blending in and observing everything around him. Those experiences would be used in his next book of poetry, Ballads of a Bohemian (1921): "The poems are given in the persona of an American poet in Paris who serves as an ambulance driver and an infantryman in the war. The verses are separated by diary entries over a period of four years."

In the 1920s, Service began writing thriller novels. The Poisoned Paradise, A Romance of Monte Carlo (New York, 1922) and The Roughneck. A Tale of Tahiti (New York, 1923) were both later made into silent movies. During the winter season, Service used to live in Nice with his family, where he met other writers, including H. G. Wells, A. K. Bruce, Somerset Maugham, Rex Ingram, Frank Scully, James Joyce, Frank Harris, and Frieda Lawrence, who all spent their winters in the French Riviera, and he wrote that he had been lucky to have had lunch with Colette.

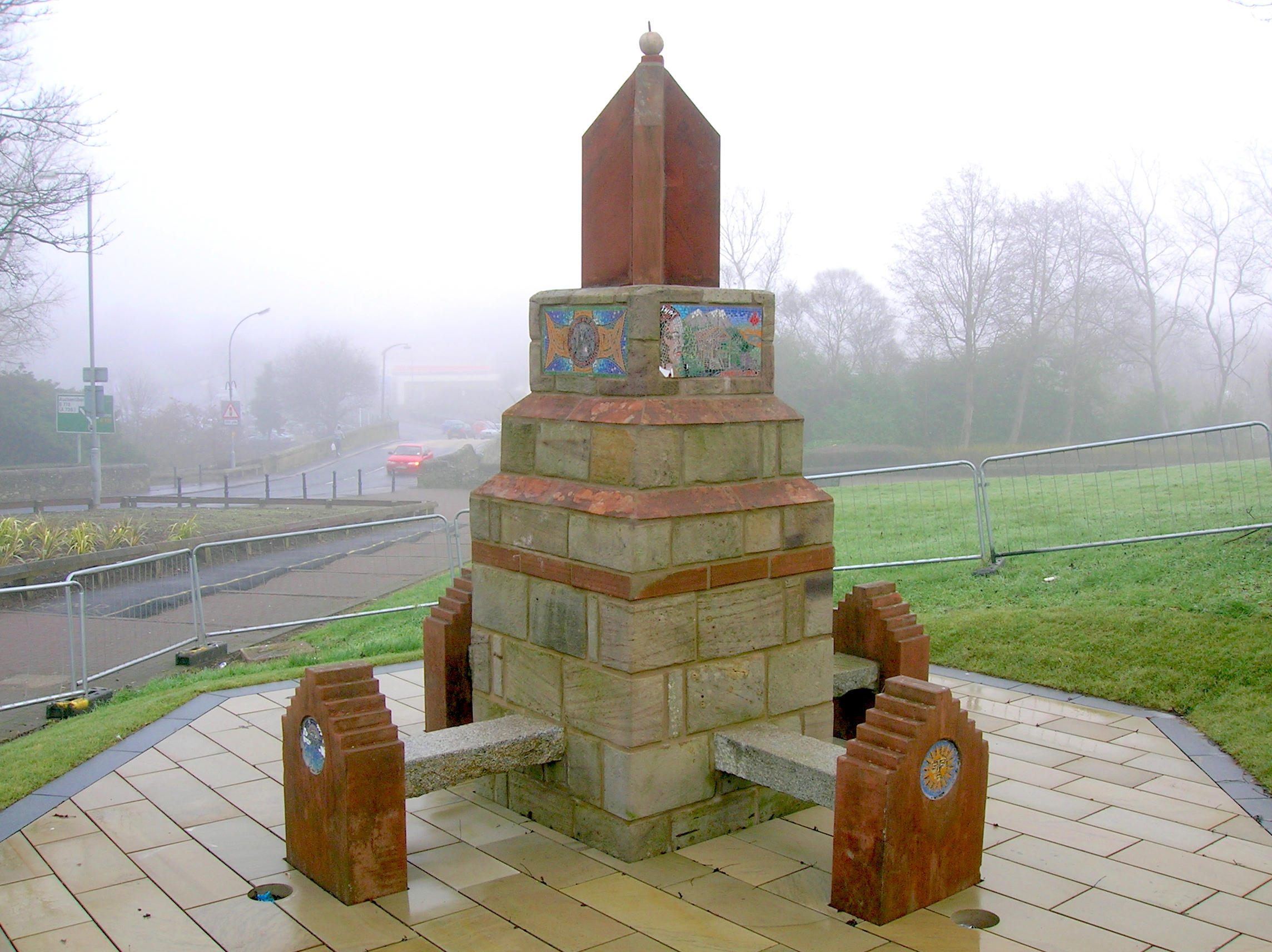
Robert Service Memorial, Kilwinning, Ayrshire

In 1930, Service returned to Kilwinning, to erect a memorial to his family in the town cemetery. He also visited the USSR in the 1930s and later wrote a satirical "Ballad of Lenin's Tomb". For this reason his poetry was never translated into Russian in the USSR, and he was never mentioned in Soviet encyclopedias.

In 1939 Service's second trip to the Soviet Union "was interrupted by news of the Molotov–Ribbentrop Pact. Service fled across Poland, Latvia, Estonia and the Baltic to Stockholm. He wintered in Nice with his family, then fled France for Canada." Not long after, the Nazis invaded France, and "arrived at his home in Lancieux ... looking specifically for the poet who had mocked Hitler in newspaper verse."

During World War II, Service lived in California, "and Hollywood had him join with other celebrities in helping the morale of troops – visiting U.S. Army camps to recite his poems. He was also asked to play himself in the movie The Spoilers (1942), working alongside Marlene Dietrich, John Wayne and Randolph Scott. "He was thrilled to play a scene with Marlene Dietrich." After the war, Service and his wife returned to his home in Brittany, to find it destroyed. They rebuilt, and he lived there until his death in 1958, although he wintered in Monte Carlo on the French Riviera. Service's wife and daughter, Iris, travelled to the Yukon in 1946 "and visited Whitehorse and Dawson City, which by then was becoming a ghost town. Service could not bring himself to go back. He preferred to remember the town as it had been." Service lived in Monaco from 1947 to 1958. He wrote prolifically during his last years, writing two volumes of autobiography, Ploughman of the Moon (1945) and Harper of Heaven (1948), as well as six books of verse, which were published from 1949 to 1955. He died in Lancieux and is buried in the local cemetery. A book he had written in 1956 was published posthumously.

In the spring of 1958, not long before Service died, Canadian broadcaster Pierre Berton recorded many hours of autobiographical television interviews for the Canadian Broadcasting Corporation, in Service's Monte Carlo flat. During these interviews, Service recited "The Shooting of Dan McGrew" and "The Cremation of Sam McGee".

== Writing ==
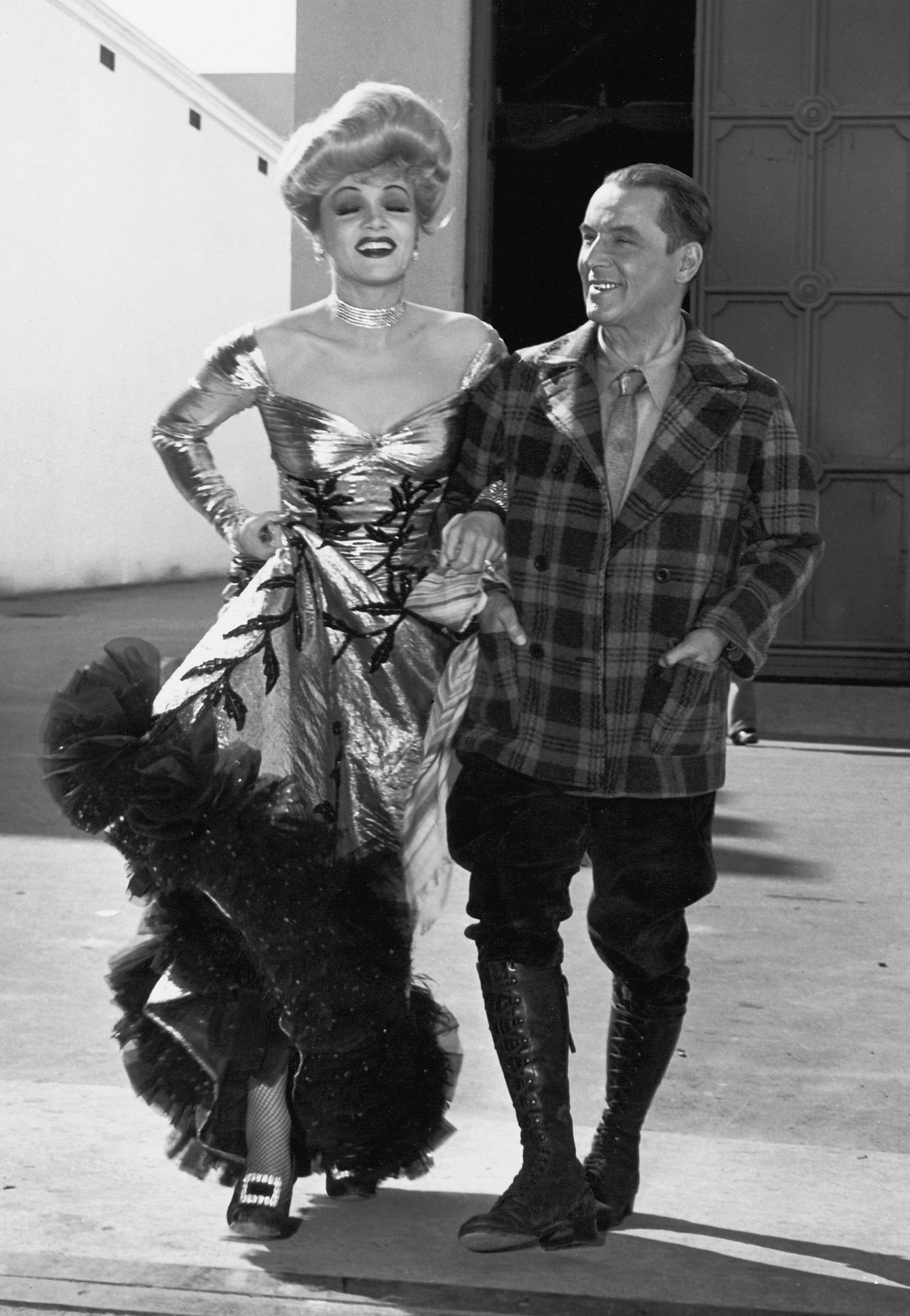
Marlene Dietrich and Service on the set of The Spoilers (1942) in which they shared a brief scene (with Service unbilled as a Yukon poet patterned after Service himself)

Robert Service wrote what some consider the most commercially successful poetry of the century. Yet his most popular works "were considered doggerel by the literary set." During his lifetime, he was nicknamed "the Canadian Kipling." – yet that may have been a double-edged compliment. As T. S. Eliot has said, "we have to defend Kipling against the charge of excessive lucidity," "the charge of being a 'journalist' appealing only to the commonest collective emotion," and "the charge of writing jingles." All those charges, and more, could be levelled against Service's best known and best loved works.

Certainly Service's verse was derivative of Kipling's. In "The Cremation of Sam McGee", for instance, he uses the form of Kipling's "The Ballad of East and West".

In his E. J. Pratt lecture "Silence In the Sea," critic Northrop Frye argued that Service's verse was not "serious poetry," but something else he called "popular poetry": "the idioms of popular and serious poetry remain inexorably distinct." Popular poems, he thought, "preserve a surface of explicit statement" – either being "proverbial, like Kipling's 'If' or Longfellow's 'Song of Life' or Burns's 'For A' That'," or dealing in "conventionally poetic themes, like the pastoral themes of James Whitcomb Riley, or the adventurous themes of Robert Service."

Service did not call his work poetry. "Verse, not poetry, is what I was after ... something the man in the street would take notice of and the sweet old lady would paste in her album; something the schoolboy would spout and the fellow in the pub would quote. Yet I never wrote to please anyone but myself; it just happened. I belonged to the simple folks whom I liked to please."

In his autobiography, Service described his method of writing at his Dawson City cabin. "I used to write on the coarse rolls of paper used by paper-hangers, pinning them on the wall and printing my verses in big charcoal letters. Then I would pace back and forth before them, repeating them, trying to make them perfect. I wanted to make them appeal to the eye as well as to the ear. I tried to avoid any literal quality."

One remarkable thing about both of Service's best-known ballads is how easily he wrote them. When writing about composing "The Shooting of Dan McGrew", 'easy' was exactly the word he used: "For it came so easy to me in my excited state that I was amazed at my facility. It was as if someone was whispering in my ear." And this was just after someone had tried to shoot him. He continued: "As I wrote stanza after stanza, the story seemed to evolve itself. It was a marvelous experience. Before I crawled into my bed at five in the morning, my ballad was in the bag."

Similarly, when he wrote "The Cremation of Sam McGee", the verses just flowed: "I took the woodland trail, my mind seething with excitement and a strange ecstasy.... As I started in: There are strange things done in the midnight sun, verse after verse developed with scarce a check ... and when I rolled happily into bed, my ballad was cinched. Next day, with scarcely any effort of memory I put it on paper."

In 1926, Archibald MacMechan, Professor of English at Canada's Dalhousie University, pronounced on Service's Yukon books in his Headwaters of Canadian Literature:

The sordid, the gross, the bestial, may sometimes be redeemed by the touch of genius; but that Promethean touch is not in Mr. Service. In manner he is frankly imitative of Kipling's barrack-room balladry; and imitation is an admission of inferiority. 'Sourdough' is Yukon slang for the provident old-timer ... It is a convenient term for this wilfully violent kind of verse without the power to redeem the squalid themes it treats. The Ballads of a Cheechako is a second installment of sourdoughs, while his novel The Trail of '98 is simply sourdough prose.

MacMechan did give grudging respect to Service's World War I poetry, conceding that his style went well with that subject, and that "his Rhymes of a Red Cross Man are an advance on his previous volumes. He has come into touch with the grimmest of realities; and while his radical faults have not been cured, his rude lines drive home the truth that he has seen."

Reviewing Service's Rhymes of a Rebel in 1952, Frye remarked that the book "interests me chiefly because ... I have noticed so much verse in exactly the same idiom, and I wonder how far Mr. Service's books may have influenced it. There was a time, fifty years ago," he added, "when Robert W.Service represented, with some accuracy, the general level of poetic experience in Canada, as far as the popular reader was concerned.... there has been a prodigious, and, I should think, a permanent, change in public taste."

== Recognition ==
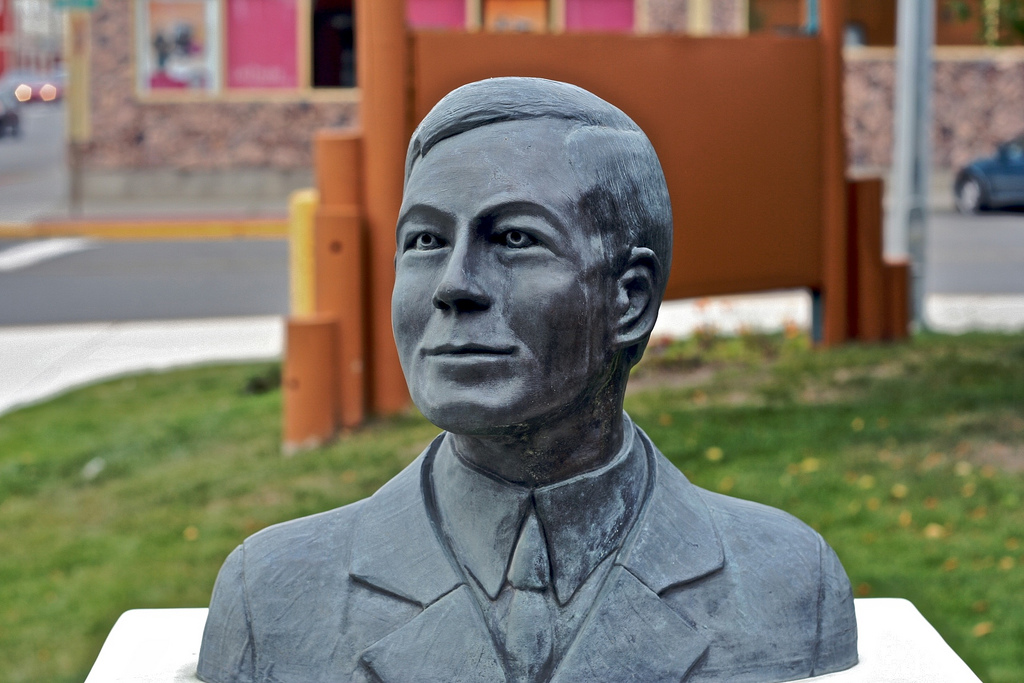
A bust of Service in Whitehorse

Robert W. Service has been honoured with schools named for him including Robert Service High School in Anchorage, Alaska, Robert Service Senior Public School (Middle/ Jr. High) in Toronto, Ontario, and Robert Service School in Dawson City.

He was honoured on a Canadian postage stamp in 1976. The Robert Service Way, a main road in Whitehorse, is named after him.

Additionally, the Bard & Banker public house in Victoria is dedicated to him, the building having at one time been a Canadian Bank of Commerce branch where Service was employed while residing in the city.

Service's first novel, The Trail of '98, was made into a movie by Metro-Goldwyn-Mayer, directed by Clarence Brown. "Trail of '98 starring Dolores del Río, Ralph Forbes and Karl Dane in 1929 ... was the first talking picture dealing with the Klondike gold rush and was acclaimed at the time by critics for depicting the Klondike as it really was."

In 1968 Canadian-born country singer Hank Snow recorded recitations of eight of Service's longer poems for an album entitled, Tales of the Yukon. The album was released by RCA Victor. Snow and other musicians including Chet Atkins and Chubby Wise provided background music.

Folksinger Country Joe McDonald set some of Service's World War I poetry (plus "The March of the Dead" from his first book), to music for his 1971 studio album, War War War.

Folksinger Jim Ratts read some of Service's poetry for his 1993 studio album, "Buckwheat at Your Service: The Readings of Robert Service." Raven Records RVNCD9303.

The Canadian whisky Yukon Jack incorporated various excerpts of his writings in their ads in the 1970s, one of which was the first four lines of his poem “The Men Who Don't Fit In”.

The town of Lancieux, where he used to come every summer, organized several recognitions to the memory of Robert W. Service. One of the streets of Lancieux has been named Robert Service Street. On 13 July 1990, a commemorative tablet was unveiled at the Lancieux Office du Tourisme by the daughter of the poet, Iris Service. An evening of celebration was organized afterward with a dinner attended by many guests from Scotland and the Yukon. A few years later, on 18 May 2002, the school of Lancieux in Brittany took the name of "École Robert W. Service". Charlotte Service-Longépé, the great-granddaughter and the granddaughter of the poet, attended the dedication ceremony and made a speech. Since 2000, the towns of Lancieux and Whitehorse are sister cities, due to Robert W. Service's life and work in both places.

Radio humorist and raconteur Jean Shepherd recorded a collection of Robert Service's poems, Jean Shepherd Reads the Poems of Robert Service.

Margaret Rutherford recited most of "The Shooting of Dan McGrew" in the 1964 film Murder Most Foul.

"The Spell of the Yukon" features significantly in the film Eureka directed by Nicholas Roeg.

=== Dawson City cabin ===
From 1909 to 1912, Robert Service lived in a small two-room cabin on Eighth Avenue, which he rented from Edna Clarke in Dawson City. His prosperity allowed him the luxury of a telephone. Service eventually decided he could not return to Dawson, as it would not be as he remembered it. He wrote in his autobiography:

"Only yesterday an airline offered to fly me up there in two days, and I refused. It would have saddened me to see dust and rust where once hummed a rousing town; hundreds where were thousands; tumbledown cabins, mouldering warehouses."

After Service left for Europe, the Imperial Order Daughters of the Empire (I.O.D.E.) took care of the cabin until 1971, preserving it. In 1971 it was taken over by Parks Canada, which maintains it, including its sod roof, as a tourist attraction.

Irish-born actor Tom Byrne created The Robert Service Show, which was presented in the front yard of the cabin, starting in 1978. This was very popular with summer visitors and set the standard for Robert Service recitations. Byrne discontinued the show at the cabin in 1995, moving it to a Front Street storefront. Since 2004 the show has been held at the Westmark Hotel in Dawson City during the summer months. Byrne later retired, and died in 2019.

At the Service Cabin, local Dawson entertainers dressed in period costumes and employed by Parks Canada offer biographical information and recite Service's poetry for visitors.

== Publications ==
- The Best of Robert Service (Hancock House Publishers)

=== Poetry ===
- Songs of a Sourdough (Toronto: William Briggs, 1907)
  - [U.S. as The Spell of the Yukon and Other Verses (New York: Barse & Hopkins, 1907; Also Dodd, Mead & Company, 1907 & 1916)].
- Ballads of a Cheechako (Toronto: William Briggs, 1909)
- Rhymes of a Rolling Stone (Toronto: William Briggs, 1912)
- Songs of the Yukon (Toronto: William Briggs, 1913) – miniature book, reprinting two poems from Songs of a Sourdough
- Rhymes of a Red-Cross Man (Toronto: William Briggs, 1916)
- Ballads of a Bohemian (Toronto: G. J. McLeod, 1921)
- Twenty Bath-Tub Ballads (London: Francis, Day and Hunter, 1939)
- Bar-Room Ballads (New York: Dodd, Mead, 1940)
- Songs of a Sun-Lover. A Book of Light Verse (New York: Dodd, Mead, 1949).
- Rhymes of a Roughneck. A Book of Verse (New York: Dodd, Mead, 1950).
- Lyrics of a Lowbrow. A Book of Verse (New York: Dodd, Mead, 1951).
- Rhymes of a Rebel. A Book of Verse (New York: Dodd, Mead, 1952).
- Songs for my Supper (New York: Dodd, Mead, 1953).
- Carols of an Old Codger (New York: Dodd, Mead, 1955).
- Rhymes for My Rags (New York: Dodd, Mead, 1956).

==== Collections ====
- The Collected Verse of Robert W. Service (London: E. Benn, 1930, 43, 48, 51, 53, 60, 73)
- The Complete Poems of Robert W. Service (New York: Dodd Mead, 1933)
- Rhyme and Romance: a Robert Service anthology (London: E. Benn, 1949)
- Later Collected Verse (New York: Dodd Mead, 1954, 55, 65)
- Collected Poems of Robert Service (New York: Dodd Mead, 1954)
- More Collected Verse (New York: Dodd Mead, 1955)
- Songs of the High North (London: E. Benn, 1958)
- The Song of the Campfire, illustrated by Richard Galaburr (New York: Dodd Mead, 1912, 39, 78)
- The Shooting of Dan McGrew and Other Favorite Poems, jacket drawing by Eric Watts (Dodd Mead, 1980)
- Servicewise and Otherwise: a selection of extracts in prose and verse from the works of Robert W. Service, which may serve as an introduction to the virile writings of that celebrated author; collected and arranged by Arthur H. Stewart
- Robert W. Service. Selected poems: Translated into Russian by Andrew Krotkov. – In: Literary Translation and Comparative Literary Science. Vol.7. – Moscow: Flinta, 2017. P. 209–409.
- Robert W. Service. The Spell of the Yukon: Selected poems. – Moscow: Vodoley Publishers, 2018. [translated into Russian by Age Of Translation site; 20 translators; collected and arranged by Eugene Witkowsky]
- The Best of Robert Service. Surrey, B.C.: Hancock House, 2003. ISBN 0-88839-545-0

=== Fiction ===
- The Trail of Ninety-Eight, A Northland Romance (Toronto: William Briggs, 1909)
- The Pretender. A story of the Latin quarter (New York: Dodd, Mead, 1914).
- The Poisoned Paradise: A Romance of Monte Carlo (New York: Dodd, Mead, 1922)
- The Roughneck, A Tale of Tahiti (New York: Barse and Hopkins, 1923)
- The Master of the Microbe: A Fantastic Romance (London: T. Fisher Unwin, 1926)
- The House of Fear, A Novel (London: T. Fisher Unwin, 1927)

=== Non-fiction ===
- Why Not Grow Young? or Living for Longevity (London: Ernest Benn, 1928)
- Ploughman of the Moon, An Adventure Into Memory (New York: Dodd, Mead, 1945) – autobiography
- Harper of Heaven. A Record of Radiant Living (New York: Dodd, Mead, 1948) – autobiography

=== Music ===
- Twenty Bath-Tub Ballads (London: Francis, Day and Hunter,1939)
- Tripe and Trotters (words and music, 1939)
- The Amorous (Square words and music, 1939)
- If you can't be Good be Careful (words and music, 1939)
- My old School Tie (words and music, 1939)
- Facility words (words by Robert W. Service & Music by Leslie T. Cochran, G. Ricordi & Co Ltd London)
- Unforgotten (words by Robert W. Service & Music by Fredrick Sixten, 2012) published by Gehrmans Musikförlag, Stockholm, Sweden

== See also ==
- Canadian literature
- Canadian poetry
- Jim Robb (artist)
- List of Canadian poets
- List of Canadian writers
- List of ambulance drivers during World War I
