= Time Flies By =

Studio album by Country Joe McDonald
- Released: September 18, 2012
- Genre: Folk
- Length: 78:31
- Label: Rag Baby Records / Globe Records
- Producer: Tim Eschliman, Joe McDonald

Country Joe McDonald chronology
Thinking of Woody Guthrie (1969)	Time Flies By (2012)

Professional ratings
Review scores
Source	Rating
AllMusic	3.5/5 stars

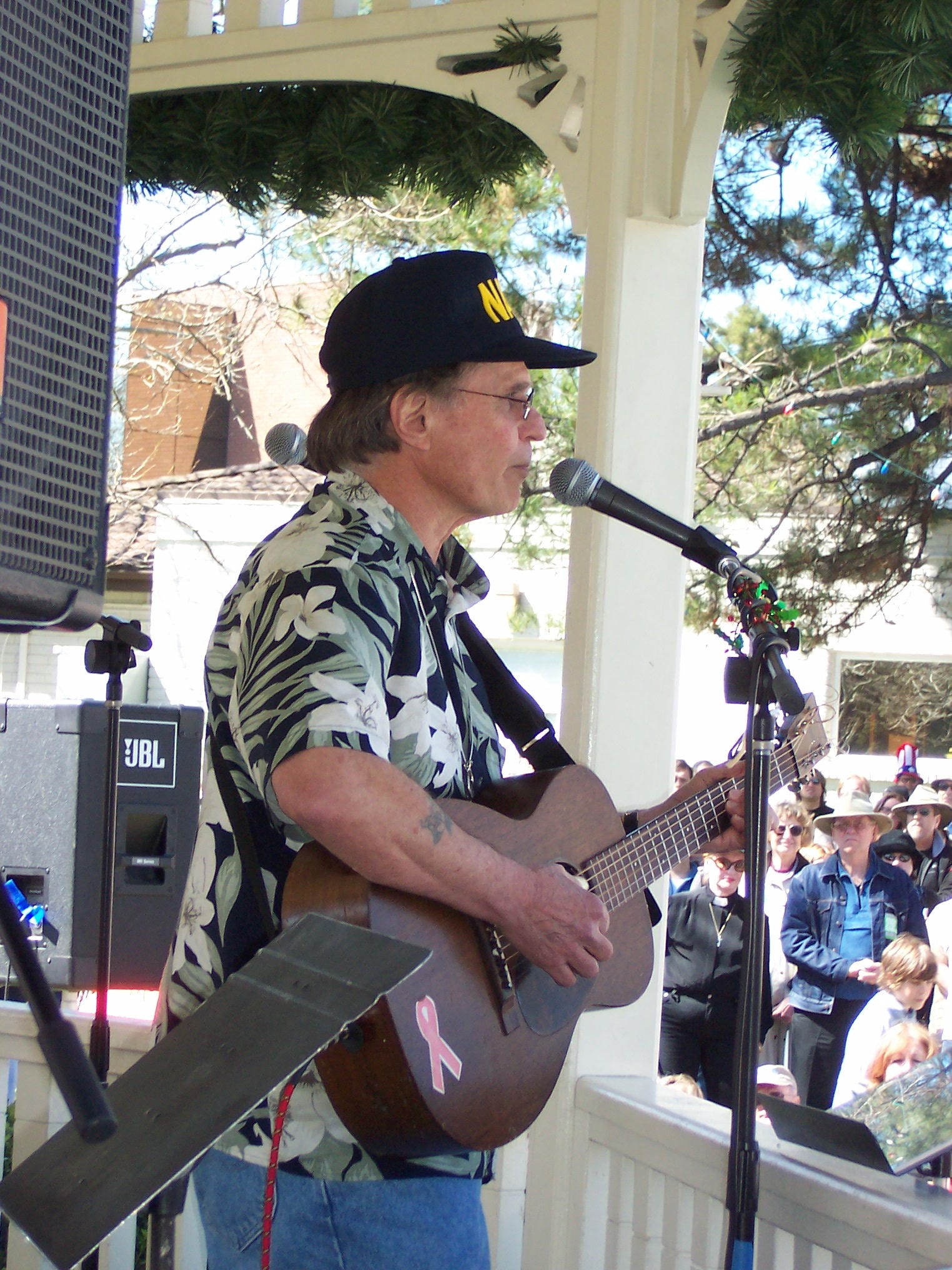
Country Joe McDonald 2006

Time Flies By is a double album by Country Joe McDonald. The 25 songs are covering 45 years of his songwriter activity. The singer and guitarist is accompanied by the Woodstock drummer Greg Dewey of Country Joe and the Fish, the bassist Tim Eschliman and several guest musicians.

Goldmine magazine described it as, "satisfying, entertaining, whimsical, important and makes one realize there ain’t never gonna be anyone like him ever again." Relix called it "The most significant new release from stalwart Bay Area singer/songwriter Country Joe McDonald in a good many years," and added that "McDonald is still an affecting deliverer of songs."

== Track listing ==
=== CD 1 ===
1. Write a Song
2. Sad and Lonely Times
3. Rainbow Stew
4. The Clone Song
5. Gunshot Wound
6. Section 43
7. All My Love in Vain
8. Rock Coast Blues
9. Katrina
10. I'm on the Road Again
11. Feels Like Heaven
12. Who Am I
13. Colorado Town
14. Dark Clouds
15. Plastic Bag

=== CD 2 ===
1. Peace on Earth
2. Yankee Doodle
3. Four More Years of Good Times
4. Rock and Roll Again
5. Trombone Blues
6. Eleventh Step
7. Plastic Dome
8. Feels Like Heaven II
9. Lady with the Lamp
10. Support the Troops
11. (Gunshots)
12. (Garbage Truck)
13. Write a Song II

== Personnel ==
- Country Joe McDonald - vocals, guitar, trombone, harmonica
- Tim Eschliman - string bass also external link here
- Greg Dewey - drums
- Several guest musicians, Harper Simon, The Persuasions, Austin de Lone, Russ Gauthier, Ken Snakebite Jacobs, Suzy Thompson, Chris & Lorin Rowan and Bernie Krause.
