= Tempus fugit (disambiguation) =

Tempus fugit is a Latin expression meaning "time flies." It may also refer to:

- "Tempus Fugit" aka "Tempus Fugue-it," a jazz composition by pianist Bud Powell
- "Tempus Fugit" (song), by progressive rock band Yes from their 1980 album Drama
- "Tempus Fugit," a Watopia island route on the cycling App Zwift.
- "Tempus Fugit" (The X-Files), an episode in season four of the American TV series, The X-Files
- Tempus Fugit (2003 film), a 2003 film by Enric Folch

== See also ==
- Time Flies (disambiguation)
