= Suffolk Meadows =

Horse racing facility on Long Island, New York

Coordinates: 40°50′37″N 72°54′13″W

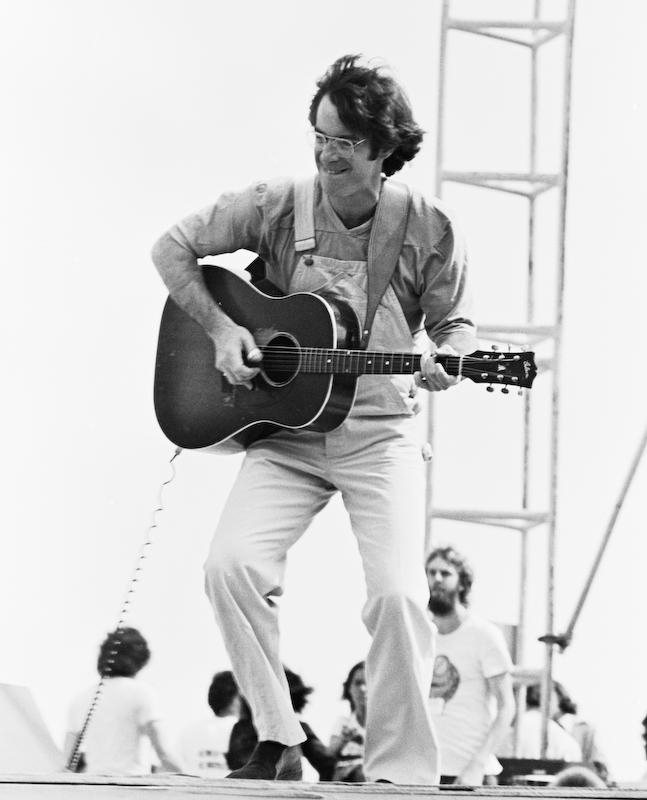
John Sebastian performed at Parr Meadows in 1979

Suffolk Meadows, originally known as Parr Meadows, was a quarter horse racing facility on Long Island that operated during 1977 and 1986. The racetrack was situated on a 65-acre (0.26 km^{2}) parcel located in Yaphank northwest of the William Floyd Parkway interchange on the Long Island Expressway. The venue was the site of a Woodstock reunion concert and was also used for other events including rodeo competitions and the county fair. The site has since been redeveloped into a mixed-use complex containing residential and commercial land uses.

== History ==
The racetrack first opened in 1977 as Parr Meadows and closed following a 113-day meet after the bank defaulted on loans. Although the track was not built by developer Ron Parr, the Parr Organization assumed ownership after the original builder ran out of funds. In May 1986, horse racing briefly returned to Suffolk Meadows for an 86-day stint. The racetrack ceased operations on October 18, 1986.

On September 8, 1979, 18,000 attendees gathered at Parr Meadows for a ten-hour concert featuring a number of the original performers from the Woodstock Festival. Musical artists attending the tenth year reunion concert included Blondie Chaplin, Canned Heat, Country Joe McDonald, John Sebastian, Leslie West, Jorma Kaukonen, Johnny Winter, Paul Butterfield, Rick Danko and Stephen Stills. Many of the concertgoers arrived the day before, parking along William Floyd Parkway and camping out in the woods.

Suffolk Meadows has also been the site of competitions for the International Professional Rodeo Association and the Suffolk County Fair. In 1997, developer Wilbur Breslin planned to develop the adjacent property into a regional shopping mall called Brookhaven Town Center. The former racetrack site has also been discussed as a potential location of a casino for the Shinnecock Indian Nation. In 2008, Sysco filed plans to construct a regional headquarters on the site, but later abandoned the project.

The site was ultimately redeveloped with apartments, townhouses and condominiums, an assisted living facility, a Home2 Suites by Hilton extended-stay hotel, and retail stores anchored by a Walmart Supercenter.
