= Country Joe McDonald =

American musician (1942–2026)

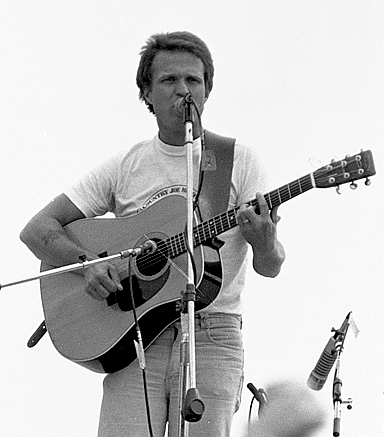
- McDonald performing at Parr Meadows in 1979

Background information
- Also known as: Country Joe
- Born: Joseph Allen McDonald; January 1, 1942; Washington, D.C., U.S.
- Died: March 7, 2026 (aged 84) Berkeley, California, U.S.
- Genres: Alternative country; country; bluegrass; country rock; folk; psychedelic rock; acid rock
- Occupations: Singer, songwriter, musician, political activist
- Instruments: Vocals, acoustic guitar
- Years active: 1959–2026
- Labels: Vanguard Records; One Way Records; Fantasy Records; Rykodisc; Shanachie Records; Rag Baby Records
- Spouses: Kathe Werum (m. 1963; div. 1966) Robin Menken (m. 1968, divorced): Kathy Wright
- Website: countryjoe.com

Joseph Allen "Country Joe" McDonald (January 1, 1942 – March 7, 2026) was an American singer, songwriter, musician and film composer, who was the lead singer and co-founder of the 1960s psychedelic folk-rock group Country Joe and the Fish. He wrote some of the group's most well-known songs, including "Not So Sweet Martha Lorraine" and "I-Feel-Like-I'm-Fixin'-to-Die Rag", the latter a protest song against U.S. involvement in the Vietnam War.

After the group's breakup in 1971, McDonald performed as a solo artist and in the spirit of Woody Guthrie, continued to musically espouse his political views through his original songs.

== Early life and early career ==
McDonald was born in Washington, D.C., on January 1, 1942, and grew up in El Monte, California, where he had moved with his parents, Florence and Worden McDonald.

His father, Worden, was born in Oklahoma and raised on a farm 100 miles (160 km) from Woody Guthrie's birthplace of Okemah. Worden worked for the phone company and, as a young man, traveled the country riding the rails, working odd jobs. His mother, Florence Plotnick, was the daughter of Russian Jewish immigrants and served for many years as the City Auditor of Berkeley, California. In their youth, both were Communist Party members and named their son after Joseph Stalin, though they later renounced the cause.

In high school, McDonald was the conductor and president of the marching band. At the age of 17, he enlisted in the U.S. Navy and spent three years stationed in Japan. After his enlistment, he attended California State Los Angeles for a year, during which he started printing a small magazine called Et Tu. In the early 1960s, he dropped out of college and moved to Berkeley with his first wife hoping to become a folk musician. He began busking on Telegraph Avenue and worked at Jon and Dierdra Lundberg's guitar shop, Lundberg Fretted Instruments. He performed on Gert Chiarito's Midnight Special, an influential radio show on the local Berkeley station KPFA and formed the Berkeley String Quartet with Carl Shrager, Bob Cooper, and Bill Steele. He also formed the Instant Action Jug Band with future bandmate Barry Melton. Both bands frequently played at the Jabberwock folk music club and coffee shop on Telegraph Avenue.

McDonald became involved with the Free Speech Movement and the wave of demonstrations against the Vietnam War at UC Berkeley. In 1965, he and ED Denson, the co-founder with John Fahey of Takoma Records, launched Rag Baby, a magazine focused on the San Francisco folk music scene. McDonald proposed doing "talking issues" of the magazine in an EP format - audio supplements - which led him and Barry "The Fish" Melton to co-found Country Joe and the Fish. The band's first songs "I-Feel-Like-I'm-Fixin'-to-Die Rag", "Superbird", "Bass Strings", "Thing Called Love" and "Section 43" were self-released through these "talking issues" of Rag Baby. At the time, McDonald and Melton were living in the building behind the Jabberwock and sold Rag Baby at events on UC Berkeley's Sproul Plaza and at Moe's Books on Telegraph. Denson began managing the band. Country Joe and the Fish played their first show under that name on November 5, 1965, joining The Fugs and Allen Ginsberg in a biology lecture room at UC Berkeley. McDonald was given the nickname "Country Joe" because Denson had heard that his namesake, Stalin, was known as "Country Joe" during World War II.

== Music career ==
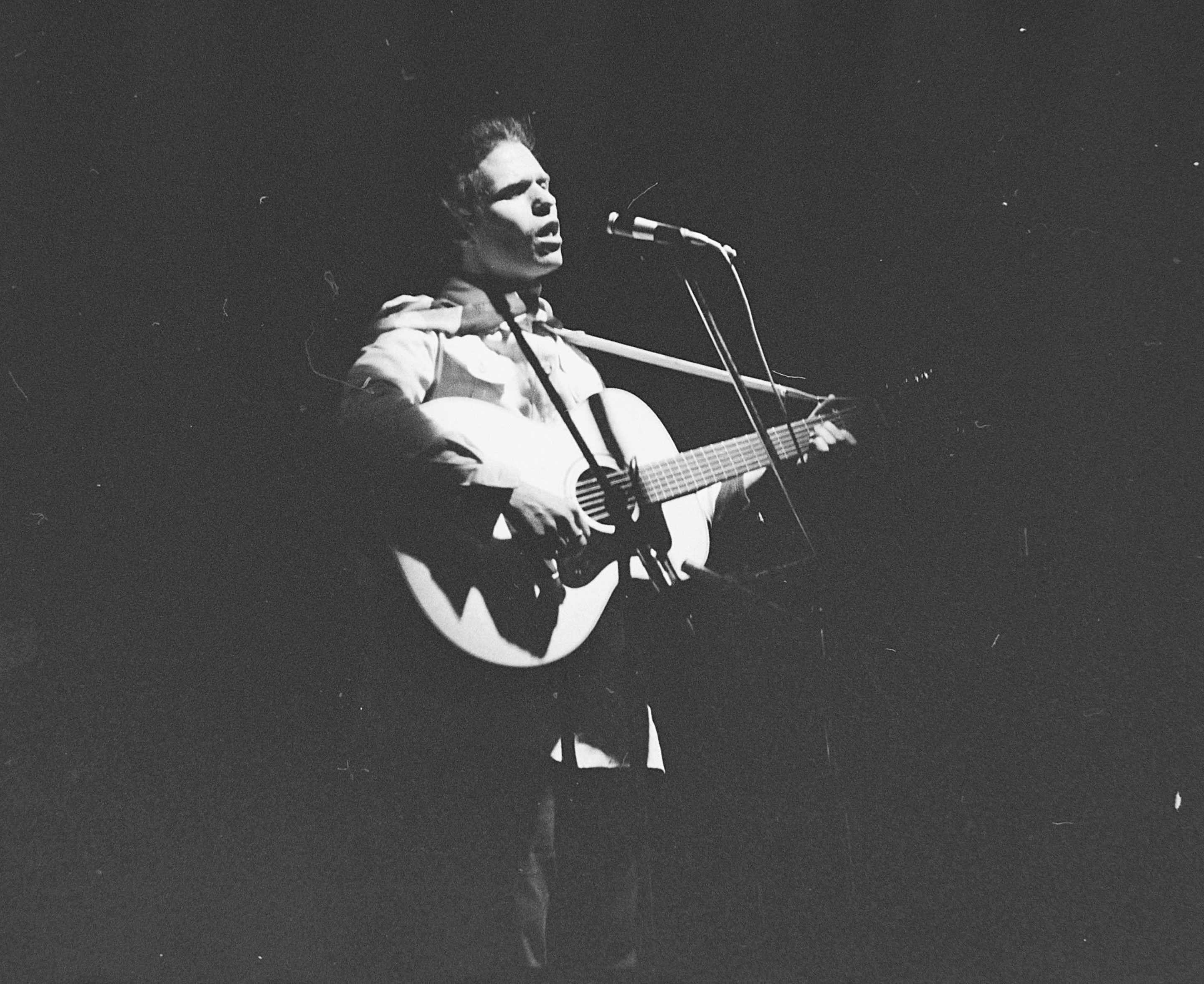
Country Joe McDonald (Kralingen, 1970)

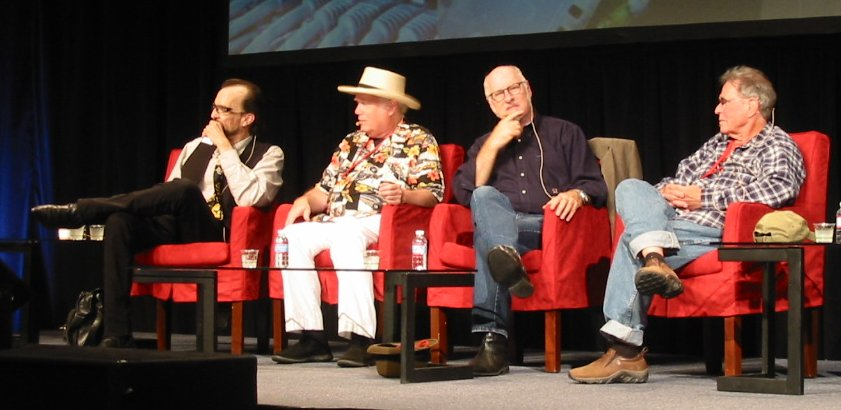
"Legendary Artists: Sounds of San Francisco" at an Audio Engineering Society convention in 2012. Left to right: Mario Cipollina, Peter Albin, Joel Selvin, McDonald

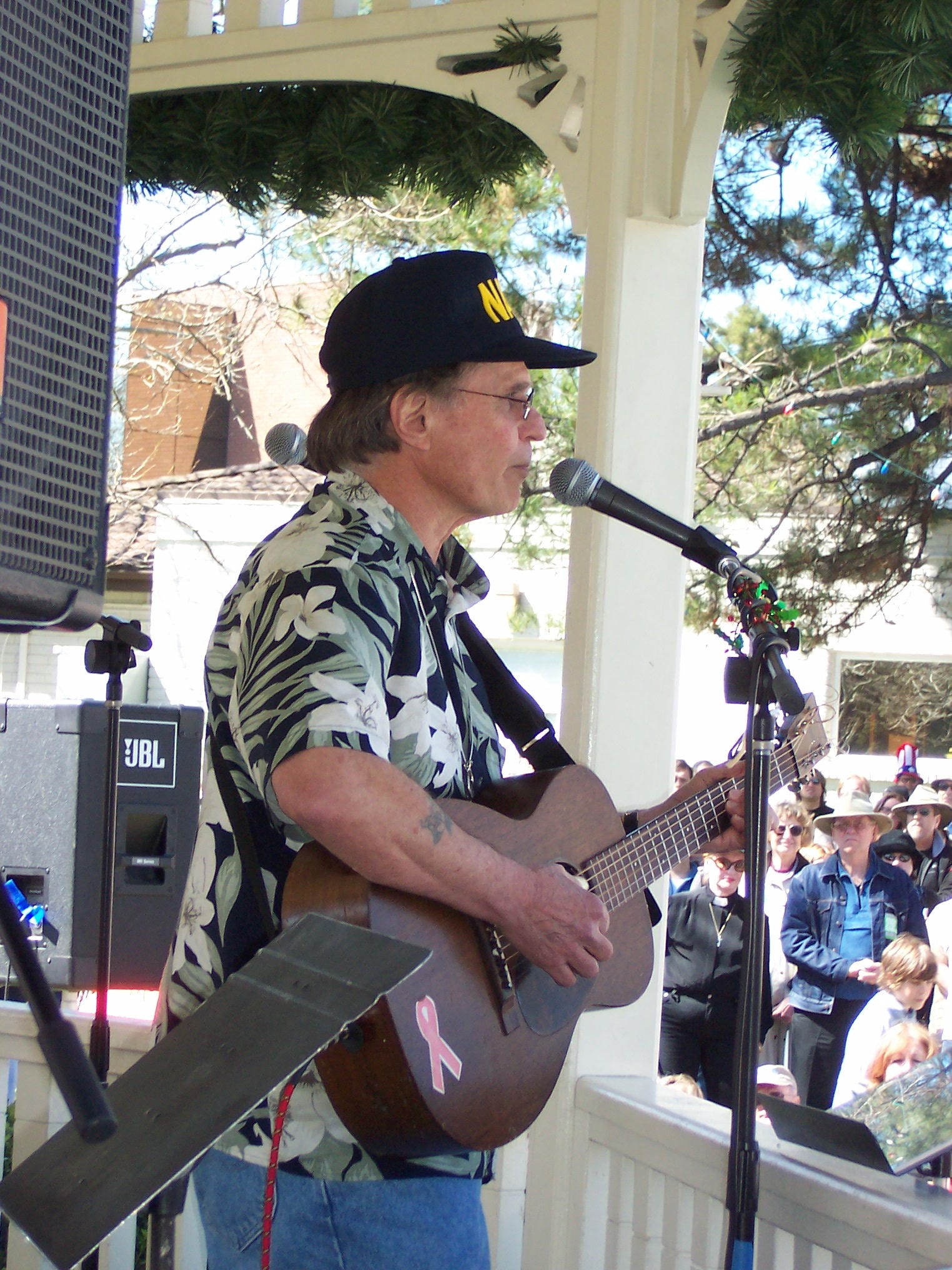
At an anti-war event at Walnut Creek, California, in 2006

McDonald recorded over 30 albums and wrote or co-wrote hundreds of songs in a career spanning the early 1960s to the mid-2010s. Country Joe & the Fish were a pioneer psychedelic rock band known for their eclectic performances at the Avalon Ballroom, the Fillmore Auditorium, the 1967 Monterey Pop Festival, the 1969 original Woodstock Festival, and the Woodstock '79 show at Madison Square Garden, along with the Woodstock Reunion 1979 at Parr Meadows racetrack near Brookhaven, Long Island.

By 1966, Country Joe & The Fish were signed to Vanguard Records and quickly released a series of albums produced by Sam Charters. Their debut album, Electric Music for the Mind and Body (May 1967), spent 38 weeks on the Billboard charts and is regarded as a seminal work of psychedelic rock. It was followed by the album I-Feel-Like-I'm-Fixin'-to-Die (November 1967), the title track of which spent 28 weeks on the Billboard chart and firmly established the band as key figures in the anti-war movement.

The band played numerous Bay Area shows throughout 1966 at the Avalon Ballroom, Filmore Auditorium and the Matrix with the Grateful Dead, Quicksilver Messenger Service, Buffalo Springfield, and Big Brother and the Holding Company. Their next album, Together (1968), featured "Rock & Soul Music", which they performed at the Woodstock concert. The album, whose cover displayed wedding photos of McDonald's marriage to his new wife Robin, reached No. 23 on the Billboard charts, though internal tensions with the band were beginning to surface.

In January 1967, McDonald appeared at San Francisco's Polo Field for the first Human Be-In. Throughout the rest of the year—during the explosion of the San Francisco music scene and the Summer of Love—the band played nearly every day, sharing bills with the Grateful Dead, Steve Miller, Big Brother and the Holding Company, Paul Butterfield, the Youngbloods, Moby Grape, the Doors, Jefferson Airplane, the San Francisco Mime Troupe, Howlin' Wolf, the Jimi Hendrix Experience, Canned Heat, Richie Havens, John Fahey, the Jim Kweskin Jug Band, James Cotton Blues Band, Sam & Dave, and poets and writers such as Richard Brautigan and Kenneth Patchen.

In April 1967, they performed at the Mobilization to End the War in Vietnam alongside Eldridge Cleaver, Coretta Scott King, Judy Collins, Big Brother and the Holding Company, and Robert Scheer. They also appeared at the Fantasy Fair and Magic Mountain Festival on Mount Tamalpais with the Doors, the Byrds, Hugh Masekela, Tim Buckley, and Captain Beefheart. The band frequently played political events, including a benefit for the Delano grape strikers, and gave two performances at San Quentin Prison—once in 1967 with the Grateful Dead and again in 1969 with the Sons of Champlin.

In 1969, the band released Here We Are Again, which featured guest appearances by Jack Casady of Jefferson Airplane and David Getz and Peter Albin of Big Brother & The Holding Company. The album spent 11 weeks on the Billboard charts and included Here I Go Again, later covered by Twiggy. Their final Vanguard album, CJ Fish (1970), was produced by Tom Wilson, renowned for his work with Bob Dylan, Simon & Garfunkel, and The Velvet Underground. Shortly after its release, the band disbanded.

His best known song,"The Fish Cheer/I-Feel-Like-I'm-Fixin'-to-Die Rag" (1965), is a black comedy novelty song about the Vietnam War, whose familiar chorus – "One, two, three, what are we fighting for?" – became widely known amongst the Woodstock generation and Vietnam veterans of the 1960s and '70s. McDonald wrote the song in about 20 minutes for an anti-Vietnam War play, and told The New York Times that he "was inspired to write a folk song about how soldiers have no choice in the matter but to follow orders, but with the irreverence of rock 'n' roll. It's essentially punk before punk existed."

The original Fish Cheer consisted of the band leading the audience in a call-and-response with the audience, spelling the word "F-I-S-H," with McDonald yelling out, "What's that spell?" twice, the audience responding, and then a third call immediately followed by the song. In the wake of the Berkeley Free Speech Movement, the cheer evolved into the "Fuck Cheer", in which he led the crowd at Woodstock in 1969. The F-I-S-H Cheer appeared on the original recording of "I-Feel-Like-I'm-Fixin'-To-Die Rag" on the LP I-Feel-Like-I'm-Fixin'-to-Die. It quickly became popular, with audiences enthusiastically joining in during live performances.

During the summer of 1968, while the band was playing the Schaefer Music Festival tour, drummer Gary "Chicken" Hirsh suggested to spell the word "fuck" instead of "fish". Although the audience embraced it, festival management did not and banned the band off the tour for life. The Ed Sullivan Show then canceled a scheduled appearance, telling them to keep the money they had already been paid in exchange for never playing on the show. The modified cheer remained a staple at most of the band's live shows throughout the years, including Woodstock.

In Worcester, Massachusetts, McDonald was arrested for obscenity and fined $500 for uttering "fuck" in public. Although the song could not be played on the radio, it went on to appear in such films and television, including Hamburger Hill, More American Graffiti, and HBO's Generation Kill, in which U.S. Marines sing it while on patrol.

=== Solo career ===
McDonald's first two solo albums, Thinking of Woody Guthrie (1969) and Tonight, I'm Singing Just For You (1970), were recorded for Vanguard in Nashville, Tennessee, with Sam Charters producing and Nashville A-Team players Hargus "Pig" Robbins, Grady Martin, and Buddy Harmon. Tonight, I'm Singing Just For You, which featured him, his wife and daughter on the cover, also featured the gospel group The Jordanairs.

Thinking of Woody Guthrie was one of first major Woody Guthrie tribute albums, and established McDonald as a prominent interpreter of Guthrie's work, which he had admired since youth. The album led to his participation in the 1970 Woody Guthrie All-Star Tribute at the Hollywood Bowl with Joan Baez, Pete Seeger, Arlo Guthrie, Odetta, Ramblin' Jack Elliot, Peter Fonda, and Will Geer. For the event, at the request of Marjorie Guthrie, Woody's widow, and Harold Leventhal, McDonald set Guthrie's Woman At Home to music. This was the first time the Guthrie family collaborated with a recording artist to add music to Woody Guthrie's lyrics.

McDonald's third solo album, War, War, War, (1971) featured the poems of Robert W. Service, set to music. In 1972, a live performance at the Bitter End, was released as Incredible Live!, featuring liner notes from Studs Terkel. His 1973 Vanguard LP Paris Sessions, was reviewed by Robert Christgau in Christgau's Record Guide: Rock Albums of the Seventies (1981), in which he said: "Amazing. The man (repeat: man) has written feminist songs that are both catchy and sensible. Despite the real/honest prison poem and the silly, outdated record fan routines, his best in about five years."

=== Activism ===
In January 1970, McDonald testified at the Chicago Seven Trial. He was one of the over one hundred witnesses the defense called, including Norman Mailer, Dick Gregory, Judy Collins, Arlo Guthrie, Phil Ochs, and Allen Ginsberg. During the trial Judge Julius J. Hoffman forbade him from singing "I-Feel-Like-I'm-Fixin-To-Die-Rag" in court. McDonald recited the lyrics instead.

In 1971, McDonald joined the FTA Show, an antiwar traveling vaudeville show, performing alongside Jane Fonda, Donald Sutherland, Holly Near, Ben Vereen, and members of The Committee. He released a three-song EP Resist! with Grootna, and raised funds for the show, which was written in part at his home. He grew disenchanted by the show, which his then-wife Robin was a writer on, and left before the filming of the FTA Show documentary, though his involvement with the show landed him on Richard Nixon's "enemies list".

McDonald was actively involved in the Save the Whales movement of the mid-70s. Inspired by Farley Mowat's book A Whale for a Killing, he wrote "Save the Whales!" which he recorded for his album Paradise With An Ocean View (1976). He performed the song at many Save the Whales concerts, including a 1976 concert with Joni Mitchell and poet Gary Snyder, and John Sebastian and Fred Neil's 1977 Rolling Coconut Revue in Japan with Jackson Browne, Warren Zevon, Odetta, and others. He began working with Greenpeace and was invited to take part in an event in British Columbia involving the Rainbow Warrior ship, and participated in a benefit concert for the Cousteau Society, along with Crosby, Stills & Nash. After meeting Jacques Cousteau and learning about the annual baby seal kills, he wrote the song Blood on The Ice, which he later recorded on his album Goodbye Blues. His music appears in the 2015 documentary How to Save the World about the origins of Greenpeace.

In 2005, McDonald joined a larger protest against California Governor Arnold Schwarzenegger's proposed budget cuts at the California State Capitol Building. Later in 2005, political commentator Bill O'Reilly compared McDonald to Cuban President Fidel Castro, remarking on McDonald's involvement in Cindy Sheehan's protests against the Iraq War. McDonald originally met Sheehan in 2004 and he wrote the song "Support the Troops" after hearing her speak about her son Casey Sheehan.

=== Influences ===
Like many folk musicians of the era, McDonald was influenced by Pete Seeger both artistically and personally. He was on the lineup to play at Seeger's festival marking the 20th anniversary of Clearwater, the sloop launched as part of efforts to restore the Hudson River. In the early 1970s, Seeger recorded a cover of "I-Feel-Like-I'm-Fixin-To-Die-Rag" which Columbia Records pressed as a 45 single, but they distributed the record only to disc jockeys and it soon disappeared.

Throughout the 2000s, McDonald performed his Tribute to Woody Guthrie show, which featured Guthrie's songs alongside spoken-word pieces drawn from the writings of Guthrie, Malvina Reynolds, and McDonald's father—himself an Oklahoma Dust Bowl refugee. In 2007, he released a live recording of the show, A Tribute To Woody Guthrie Performed by Country Joe McDonald. Joel Selvin of The San Francisco Chronicle described the performance as one in which "McDonald channels this wry, compassionate man's wisdom without ever getting in the way, a refreshingly egoless performance by someone who remains as amazed by Guthrie as anyone."

=== Rag Baby Records ===
During the 1980s and 90s, McDonald, along with Bill Belmont, relaunched Rag Baby Records, named after the magazine he started in 1965. They released several albums, including McDonald's On My Own (1980), Joady Guthrie's Spys on Wall Street (1985), which he produced, as well as his own Superstitious Blues (1991) and Carry On (1995). Both albums feature Jerry Garcia on tracks "Clara Barton", "Starship Ride", "Lady with the Lamp", and "Blues for Michael", the last a tribute to their mutual friend, blues guitarist Michael Bloomfield. McDonald and Garcia performed "Starship Ride" and "Lady with the Lamp" live together at least once in 1989 in San Francisco. Garcia also appears on Country Joe & The Fish Live! at the Filmore West 1969.

Later releases included McDonald's 50 (2017), and Natural Imperfections, (2005), a collaboration between McDonald and soundscape ecologist Bernie Krause—best known as one half of the experimental duo Beaver and Krause. The instrumental project blends field recordings with atmospheric composition, aiming to immerse listeners "into the magical world of nature and music".

In 2003 McDonald was sued for copyright infringement over his signature song, specifically the "One, two, three, what are we fighting for?" chorus part, as derived from the 1926 early jazz classic "Muskrat Ramble", co-written by Kid Ory. The suit was brought by Ory's daughter Babette, who held the copyright at the time. Since decades had already passed from the time McDonald composed his song in 1965, Ory based her suit on a new version of it recorded by McDonald in 1999. The California district court, however, upheld McDonald's laches defense, noting that Ory and her father were aware of the original version of the song, with the same questionable section, for some three decades without bringing a suit. The court awarded McDonald reasonable attorneys' fees and permitted him to file a bill of costs.

=== Reunions ===
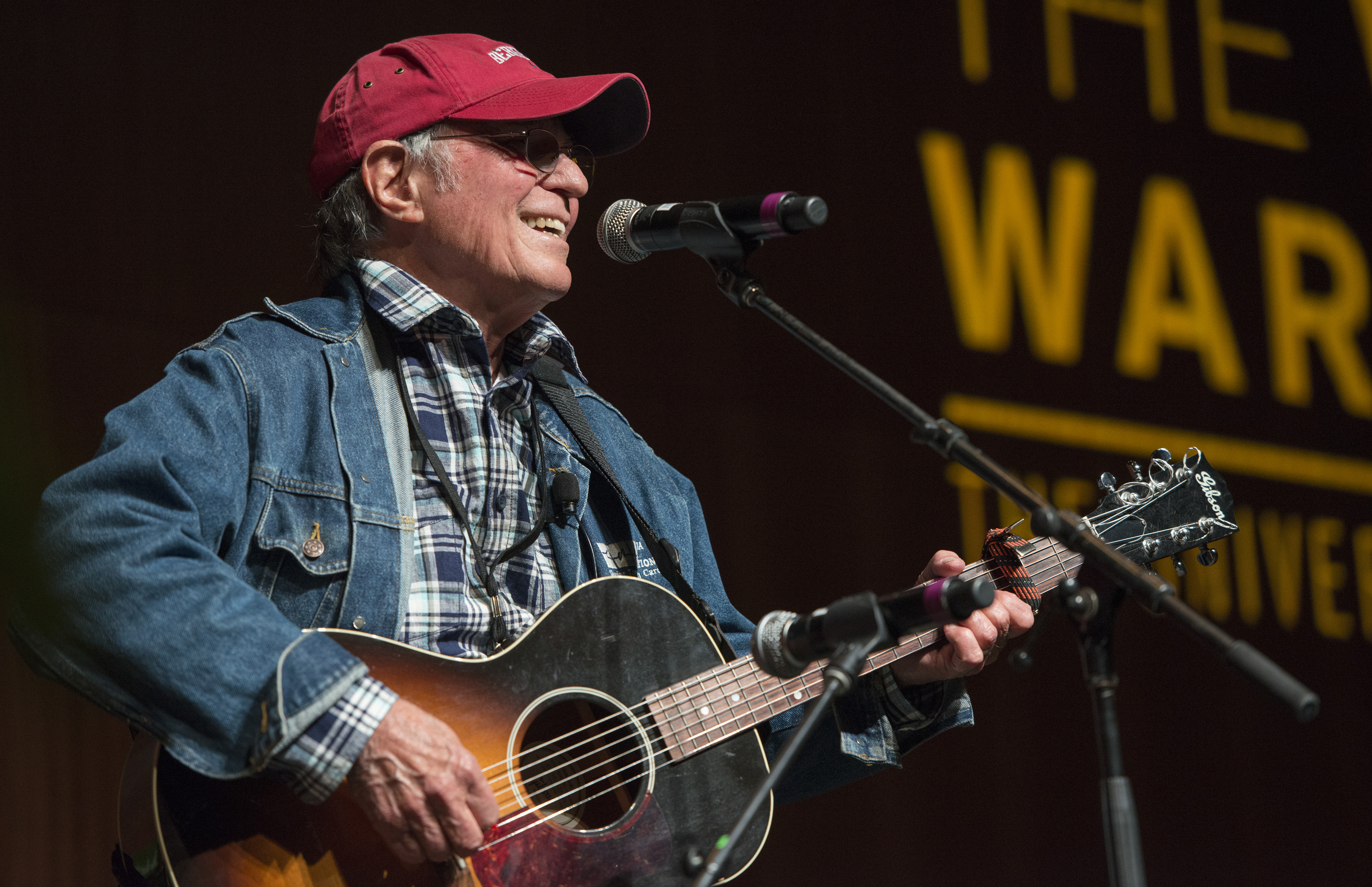
McDonald at the LBJ Library in 2016

McDonald reconvened on occasion with his bandmates from Country Joe and the Fish, notably for their 1977 album Reunion. In 2004, McDonald regrouped with three of the original members (Bruce Barthol, David Bennett Cohen, and Gary "Chicken" Hirsh) and they toured the US western seaboard, New York state, and the United Kingdom as the "Country Joe Band".

In 2017, McDonald, alongside Alec Palao, formed The Electric Music Band; the intention of the group was to perform the early psychedelic material of the early career of Country Joe and the Fish. The band performed Electric Music For The Mind And Body in its entirety—the line-up included McDonald on vocals, guitar, and harmonica, Palao on electric bass, the Rain Parade's Matt Piucci on electric guitar, Derek See of the Chocolate Watchband on electric guitar, Andrea Hensler on keyboards, and Jozef Becker on drums.

In 2019, McDonald was scheduled to play in Woodstock's 50th Anniversary festival, which was cancelled after negotiations between partners failed.

== Work with Vietnam veterans ==
McDonald's long-standing commitment to Vietnam veterans and the peace movement was in evidence throughout his career and remains part of his legacy. He successfully led the effort to create the Vietnam Veterans Memorial in Berkeley, California, and was involved in establishing the Vietnam Veterans Memorial in San Francisco. He performed at GI coffeehouses and commemorative events and benefits across the country for organizations such as San Francisco's Sword to Plowshares, Vietnam Veterans Against the War, and at ceremonies at the Vietnam Veterans Memorial in Washington, D.C. He also took part in the three-day Vietnam War Summit at the LBJ Library in 2016, appearing alongside notable figures such as former Secretary of State John Kerry, filmmaker Ken Burns, activist Tom Hayden, Henry Kissinger, and musician Peter Yarrow.

As both a solo artist and a member of Country Joe & The Fish, McDonald composed and recorded numerous songs about veterans and war. His albums War, War, War and The Vietnam Experience focus entirely on themes of conflict and its aftermath, featuring tracks such as "Agent Orange". He also performed at the 1986 "Welcome Home Vietnam Veterans" benefit concert at the LA Forum with Whoopi Goldberg, Jon Voight, Brian Wilson, and Neil Young.

McDonald recounted a story he attributed to Phil Butler, a former Hanoi Hilton prisoner of war and co-founder of Veterans for Peace, stating that the Viet Cong occasionally played American music to demoralize captives, but that hearing I-Feel-Like-I'm-Fixin-to-Die-Rag instead boosted their morale. He also related an account from a Vietnam veteran who said that a friend died in his arms during the war, and that the friend's final words were, "Whoopee, we're all gonna die."

== Film and TV work ==
In 1970, McDonald wrote several songs for Danish filmmaker Jens Jorgen Thorsen's adaptation of Henry Miller's Quiet Days in Clichy. That same year, he appeared with Country Joe & The Fish, as the leader of a gang of outlaws called The Crackers in the psychedelic western Zachariah, starring Don Johnson.

Throughout the 1970s, he continued to work both as an actor and composer. He appeared in and contributed music to Qué Hacer (1972), the Chilean film directed by Saul Landau and Nina Serrano and inspired by the election of president Salvador Allende. He also appeared in Roger Corman's Gas-s-s-s (1970), alongside Bud Cort, Talia Shire, and Cindy Williams, and later in More American Graffiti (1979). He also appeared in the 1993 miniseries Tales of The City.

== Personal life and death ==
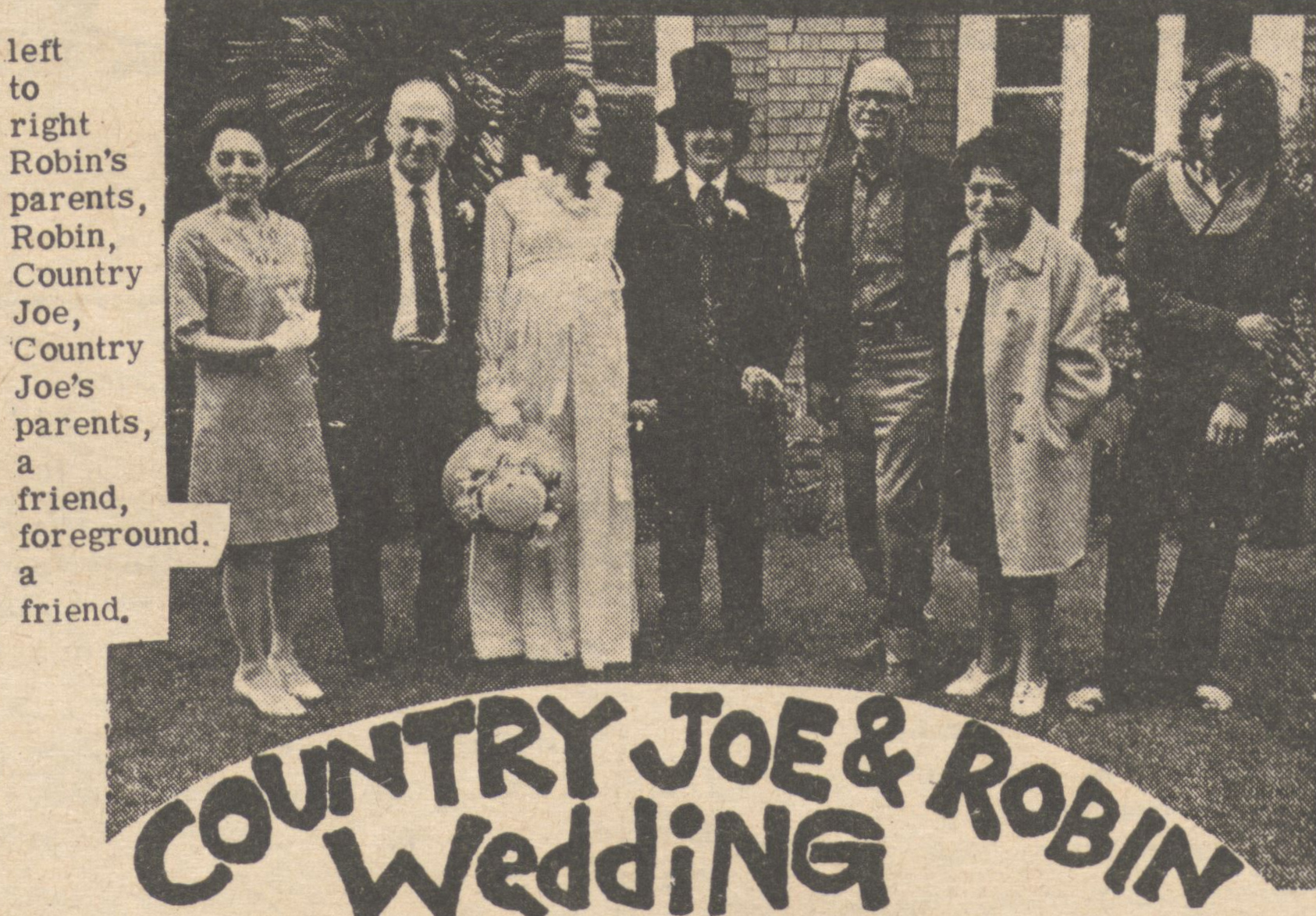
Photo from Country Joe's 1968 marriage to Robin Menken

McDonald was married to Kathe Werum from 1963 to 1966.

McDonald met Janis Joplin in 1967 in San Francisco. They got together after a gig at the Golden Sheaf Bakery and then lived together for about three months. Although angered when he left her for another woman, Robin Menken, Joplin asked him to write a song about her; the result was "Janis". On March 31, 1968, McDonald married Menken, a year after his divorce from Werum.

In 1968, Robin Menken gave birth to the couple's first daughter, Seven Anne McDonald, in San Francisco. A television child actor in the late 1970s and early 1980s, she later managed Johnny Depp's Viper Room nightclub and the alternative rock band Smashing Pumpkins.

McDonald had four other children: Devin (born 1976) and Tara (born 1980) from his marriage to Janice Taylor, and Emily (born 1988) and Ryan (born 1991) from his marriage to Kathy Wright.

McDonald died of complications from Parkinson's disease at his home in Berkeley, California, on March 7, 2026, at the age of 84.

== Discography ==
=== Studio albums ===
- Thinking of Woody Guthrie (1969, Vanguard 6546)
- Tonight I'm Singing Just for You (1970, Vanguard 6557)
- Hold On It's Coming (1971, Vanguard 79314)
- War War War (1971, Vanguard 79315) (1994, One Way 30995 CD) - No. 185 U.S. Billboard
- Paris Sessions (1973, Vanguard 79328) (One Way 30909 CD)
- Country Joe (1974, Vanguard 79348) (1996, One Way 30997 CD)
- Paradise with an Ocean View (1975, Fantasy 9495) (1994, Fantasy CD reissue) - No. 124 U.S. Billboard
- Love Is a Fire (1976, Fantasy 9511)
- Goodbye Blues (1977, Fantasy 9525)
- Rock N Roll from Planet Earth (1978, Fantasy 9544)
- Leisure Suite (1980, Fantasy 9586)
- On My Own (1981, Rag Baby 1012) (1997, One Way 31372 CD)
- Child's Play (1983, Rag Baby 1018) (1997, One Way 34431 CD)
- Peace on Earth (1984, Rag Baby 1019)(1995, One Way 31369 CD)
- Vietnam Experience (1988, Rag Baby) (1994 One Way 30991 CD)
- Superstitious Blues (1991, Rykodisc 10201) CS/CD)
- Carry On (1994, Shanachie) (1996, Shanachie 8019 CD)
- Time Flies By (2012, Rag Baby 1041)
- 50 (2017, Rag Baby 1042)

=== Live albums ===
- Incredible! Live! (1972, Vanguard 79316) Live album, No. 179 US
- Into the Fray (1982, Rag Baby, 1996, One Way 31370 CD) Live in Germany
- Eat Flowers and Kiss Babies Live with Bevis Frond (1999, Woronzow 33)
- Country Joe Live at the Borderline (2007, Rag Baby 1037)
- War, War, War (Live) (2008, Rag Baby 1040)
- A Tribute to Woody Guthrie (2008, Rag Baby 1039)

=== Soundtracks ===
- Quiet Days in Clichy (Soundtrack) (1970, Vanguard 79303) 5 original songs

=== Collaborative albums ===
- Crossing Borders with M.L. Liebler (2002, Rag Baby 1034)
- Natural Imperfections with Bernie Krause (2005, Rag Baby 1037)
- Bear's Sonic Journals: Sing Out! (2024, Owsley Stanley Foundation) – includes a live solo performance by McDonald

=== Compilation albums ===
- Essential Country Joe McDonald (1976, Vanguard (2) 85/86)
- Animal Tracks (1983, Animus UK FEEL 1)
- Classics (1989, Fantasy 7709)
- Best of Country Joe McDonald: The Vanguard Years (1969–1975) (1990, Vanguard 119/20)
- Something Borrowed, Something New (The Best Of) (1998, Rag Baby 1030)
- A Reflection on Changing Times (2001) Akarma) rerelease of early Vanguard albums by Italian label
- Vanguard Visionaries: Country Joe McDonald (2007, Vanguard 73171)

== Filmography ==
=== Actor ===
- ¡Qué hacer! (1970) as Country
- Gas-s-s-s! -Or- It Became Necessary to Destroy the World in Order to Save It (1970) as AM Radio
- Zachariah (1971) as a band member, Cracker
- More American Graffiti (1979) as Country Joe and the Fish
- Armistead Maupin's Tales of the City (TV series) (1993) as Joaquin
