= Thinking of Woody Guthrie =

Studio album by Country Joe McDonald
- Released: December 1969
- Recorded: August 1969
- Studio: Bradley's Barn (Mount Juliet, Tennessee)
- Genre: Country rock, folk rock
- Length: 32:24
- Label: Vanguard
- Producer: Samuel Charters

Country Joe McDonald chronology
Thinking of Woody Guthrie (1969)	Tonight I'm Singing Just For You (1969)

Thinking of Woody Guthrie was released in 1969 by Vanguard Records and is the debut solo album of Country Joe McDonald, best known for his work with Country Joe & the Fish. It was a different approach by McDonald to release a folk music and country album in the style of Woody Guthrie. Prior to this solo release, he was known to make albums in a psychedelic style with his band. The album was a tribute to the work of Woody Guthrie, a country and folk musician who died two years earlier. All of the tracks on the album were either composed or performed by Guthrie. McDonald was heavily influenced by Guthrie since he was a child. McDonald could recall his interest of Guthrie came first when his parents played Guthrie's first album, Dust Bowl Ballads. Even though McDonald has issued several albums in his career, he looks to this album as the piece he is most proud of.

== Background ==
McDonald had signed to Vanguard Records as a solo performer and went to Nashville with Sam Charters to record his first solo album in a small studio known as Bradley's Barn. McDonald and his band were still together, but the relationship was faltering, and they would break up soon after CJ Fish was released. McDonald was backed by well-regarded country musicians like Grady Martin in recording sessions for the album. Songs included were Guthrie favorites like "Tom Joad" and "This Land is Your Land". Although the studio musicians did not know the compositions McDonald wanted, they learned them very fast. Recording for the ten tracks took only a day to complete. With the spare recording time, more country standards were completed for McDonald's next album, Tonight I'm Singing Just For You. The tracks were meant to retain the spirit of Guthrie's recordings so the songs were only adjusted to complement McDonald's own style.

== Reception and legacy ==
Professional ratings
Review scores
Source	Rating
AllMusic	4.5/5 stars
The Village Voice	C

Reviewing the album for Rolling Stone in 1970, Gary Von Tersch said, "Admittedly, this is a low-key, non-fiery record, but it has a certain honesty. And it also lets you hear what a truly fine vocalist Joe is — he handles such diverse songs as 'Tom Joad,' 'Talkin' Dust Bowl' and 'Roll On Columbia' with ease and just the proper amount of fervor." Robert Christgau was less impressed in The Village Voice: "It's the concept of this album that I don't like. Musically, it's not bad—a nice selection of Woody's tunes rendered agreeably by Joe and some Nashville sidemen. As an educational project I suppose it could be called, er, worthwhile. But anyone who has read this far may consider himself educated; the real thing is easy to swallow and can be purchased at better record shops."

In 1975, McDonald was present at the Hollywood Bowl with other contemporaries to partake in a celebration of Guthrie's career, thanks in part to the album. In homage to his inspiration, McDonald performed "Woman At Home", a Guthrie track that was previously unreleased at the time. Country Joe McDonald continues to create tributes for Guthrie, all starting from this album, and Billy Bragg is noted as saying, "Like no one of his generation, Country Joe McDonald carries on the mission of Woody Guthrie."

The original compact disc release of the album was on May 13, 1989. It was distributed by Vanguard Records.

== Track listing ==
All tracks composed by Woody Guthrie; except where indicated

No.	Title	Writer(s)	Length
1.	"Pastures of Plenty"		2:13
2.	"Talkin' Dust Bowl"		2:22
3.	"Blowing Down That Dusty Road"	Guthrie, Lee Hays	2:34
4.	"So Long (It's Been Good to Know Yuh)"		3:01
5.	"Tom Joad"	Traditional; arranged by Woody Guthrie	7:08
6.	"The Sinking of the Reuben James"	Traditional; arranged by Woody Guthrie	2:42
7.	"Roll on, Columbia"	Guthrie, Huddie Ledbetter, John Lomax	3:25
8.	"Pretty Boy Floyd"		3:22
9.	"When the Curfew Blows"		2:16
10.	"This Land Is Your Land"	Traditional; arranged by Woody Guthrie	3:21

== Personnel ==
- Country Joe McDonald - vocals, guitar
- Ray Edenton, Samuel Charters, Harold Rugg - guitar
- Grady Martin - guitar, sitar, dobro
- Buddy Harman - drums
- Harold Bradley, Norbert Putnam - bass
- Hargus "Pig" Robbins - piano

Production

- Producer - Samuel Charters
- Engineer and sound mixer - Jerry Bradley
